= List of villages in Kadapa district =

This is an alphabetical list of villages in Kadapa district, Andhra Pradesh before its reorganisation on 4 June 2022, India. For current list, see Category:Villages in Kadapa district

== A–B ==
- Akkayapalle
- Amagampalli
- Arakatavemula
- Araveedu
- Atlur
- Attirala
- B. Kodur
- Bhumayapalle
- Boggudupalli
- Brahmamgari Matham

== C ==
- Chakarayapet
- Chapadu
- Chemmumiahpet
- Chennur, Kadapa district
- Chilamkur
- Chinnachowk
- Chinnaiahgaripalli
- Chinnamandem
- Chinnapasupula
- Chinnayarasala Harijanawada
- Chinthakommadinne
- Chitvel

== D–E ==
- Dammanapalli
- Duvvur
- Dwaraka Nagar
- E. Kothapalli
- Endapalli

== G–H ==
- Gadeguduru
- Galiveedu
- Gandikota
- Gandikovvur
- Garalamadugu
- Himakuntla

== K ==
- Kalasapadu
- Kamalakur
- Kamalapuram
- Karmalavaripalle
- Kavalakuntla
- Kesalingayapalli
- Khajipet Sunkesula
- Kondam Palli
- Kondapuram
- Korrapadu
- Kumpinipuram

== L–O ==
- Lakkireddipalle
- Lakshmigari Palli
- Lingala
- Maduru
- Mallepalli
- Mantapampalle
- Mylavaram
- Nandalur
- Obulareddypeta
- Onipenta

== P ==
- Pamuluru
- Pathagollapalle
- Pedda Orampadu
- Peddamudium
- Peddapasupula
- Peddullapalli
- Pedduru
- Penagalur
- Pendlimarri
- Porumamilla
- Potladurthi
- Pullampeta
- Puttanavari Palli

== R–S ==
- R. Rachapalli
- Rajampet
- Rajasaheb Pet
- Rajupalem
- Ramapuram
- Rayavaram
- Sambepalle
- Sangala Palli
- Siddavatam
- Siddayya Gari Matham
- Simhadripuram
- Surabhi

== T ==
- T. Chowdaravaripalli
- T. Sundupalle
- Tallapaka
- Tallaproddatur
- Tangatur
- Tekurpeta
- Thallamapuram
- Thimmarajupally
- Thimmasamudram
- Thondur

== V–Y ==
- Vaparala
- Veeraballe
- Veeraballi
- Veerapunayunipalle
- Velavali
- Vellala
- Vempalle
- Vemula
- Vontimitta
- Yerra Cheruvu Palli
