= Kadapa Zilla Praja Parishad =

Zilla Praja Parishad YSR Kadapa District

Type
- Type: Zilla Parishad of Kadapa
- Established: 1990 district

Leadership
- Chairperson: Vacant
- Deputy chairperson: Vacant
- CEO: K. Dinesh
- Seats: 40

Elections
- Last election: 11 November 2021
- Next election: TBH

Kadapa Zilla Parishad is the district council for Kadapa in the Indian state of Andhra Pradesh. It is one of 28 district-level local government bodies within the state.

It has 40 Zilla Parishad Territorial Constituencies (ZPTCs), one per mandal in Kadapa district.

== History ==
=== 2022 and 2025-2026 restructuring ===
In April 2022 the Zilla Parishads in Andhra Pradesh were reorganised to reflect the expansion from 13 to 26 districts. Following a review of the new boundaries, the additional districts of Polavaram and Markapuram were added in 2025, bringing the total to 28 districts. Despite the reorganisation, the then-current chairmen and vice-chairmen were to remain in their existing seats until 2026. As such, even though the district was bifurcated in 2022, the ZP continued as a united district council for the previous boundaries until September 2026.

In September of 2026, the Government of Andhra Pradesh announced that the Zilla Praja Parishads would be restructured under the new district boundaries at the end of the term on September 24, 2026. CEOs were subsequently appointed in October 2026 to establish the new district councils.

== List of ZPTCs ==
Kadapa ZP has had the following ZPTCs since 2026:

- Atlur (Atlur)
- B.Kodur (B. Kodur)
- Badvel (Badvel)
- Brahmamgarimattam (Brahmamgari Matham)
- Chakrayapet (Chakarayapet)
- Chapad (Chapadu)
- Chennur Chennur)
- Chinthakommadinne (Chintakomma Dinne)
- Duvvur (Duvvur)
- Gopavaram (Gopavaram)
- Jammalamadugu (Jammalamadugu)
- Kadapa (Kadapa)
- Kalasapadu (Kalasapadu)
- Kamalapuram (Kamalapuram)
- Khajipeta (Khajipet)
- Kondapuram (Kondapuram)
- Lingala (Lingala)
- Muddanur (Muddanur)
- S.Mydukur (Mydukur)
- Mylavaram (Mylavaram)
- Nandalur (Nandalur)
- Peddamudiam (Peddamudium)
- Pendlimarry (Pendlimarri)
- Porumamilla (Porumamilla)
- Proddutur (Proddatur)
- Pulivendula (Pulivendla)
- Rajampet (Rajampet)
- Rajupalem (Rajupalem)
- Sidhout (Siddavatam)
- Simhadripuram (Simhadripuram)
- Sri Avadhutha Kasinayana (Kasinayana)
- T.Sundupalle (T. Sundupalle)
- Thondur (Thondur)
- Vallur (Vallur)
- Veeraballe (Veeraballi)
- Veerapunayunipalle (Veerapanayani Palle)
- Vempalli (Vempalle)
- Vemula (Vemula)
- Vontimitta (Vontimitta)
- Yerraguntla (Yerraguntla)

== See also ==
- List of Zilla Praja Parishads in Andhra Pradesh
