= Kamalapuram mandal =

- Mandal
- Interactive map of Kamalapuram mandal
- Location in Andhra Pradesh, India
- Coordinates: 14.5833°N 78.6500°E
- Country: India
- State: Andhra Pradesh
- District: YSR Kadapa

Languages
  - Official: Telugu
- Time zone: UTC+5:30 (IST)
- Vehicle registration: AP-03

Kamalapuram mandal is a mandal in Kadapa district of the Indian state of Andhra Pradesh. It is under the administration of Kadapa revenue division and the headquarters are located at Kamalapuram. The mandal is bounded by Yerraguntla, Proddutur, Chapad, Khajipet, Vallur, Pendlimarri and Veerapunayunipalle mandals.

== Demographics ==
As of 2011 census, the mandal had a population of 52,168. The total population constitute, 25,969 males and 26,199 females —a sex ratio of 991 females per 1000 males. 5,730 children are in the age group of 0–6 years, of which 2,998 are boys and 2,732 are girls —a ratio of 911 per 1000. The average literacy rate stands at 68.49% with 31,806 literates.

== Towns and villages ==
As of 2011 census, the mandal has 12 villages and no towns. Kamalapuram is the most populated and Gollapalle is the least populated village in the mandal.

The settlements in the mandal are listed below:

1. Apparaopalle
2. C.Gopalapuram
3. Chinnachepalle
4. Dadireddipalle
5. Gangavaram
6. Gollapalle
7. Jambapuram
8. Kamalapuram
9. Kokatam
10. Letapalle
11. Mirapuram
12. Nallingayapalle
13. Pachikalapadu
14. Pandillapalle
15. Peddacheppalle
16. Podadurthi
17. Ramachandrapuram
18. Sambatur
19. T.Sadipirala
20. Thurakapalle
21. Vibharampuram
22. Yellareddipalle
23. Yerragudipadu

== Government and politics ==
Kamalapuram mandal is one of the 6 mandals under Kamalapuram (Assembly constituency) and also a part of Kadapa (Lok Sabha constituency), one of the 25 Lok Sabha constituencies representing Andhra Pradesh. The present MLA is Pochima Reddy Ravindranath Reddy, who won the Andhra Pradesh Legislative Assembly election, 2014 representing YSR Congress Party.

== See also ==
- Kadapa district
