= Jammalamadugu revenue division =

Coordinates: 15°54′N 80°40′E

- revenue division in YSR district
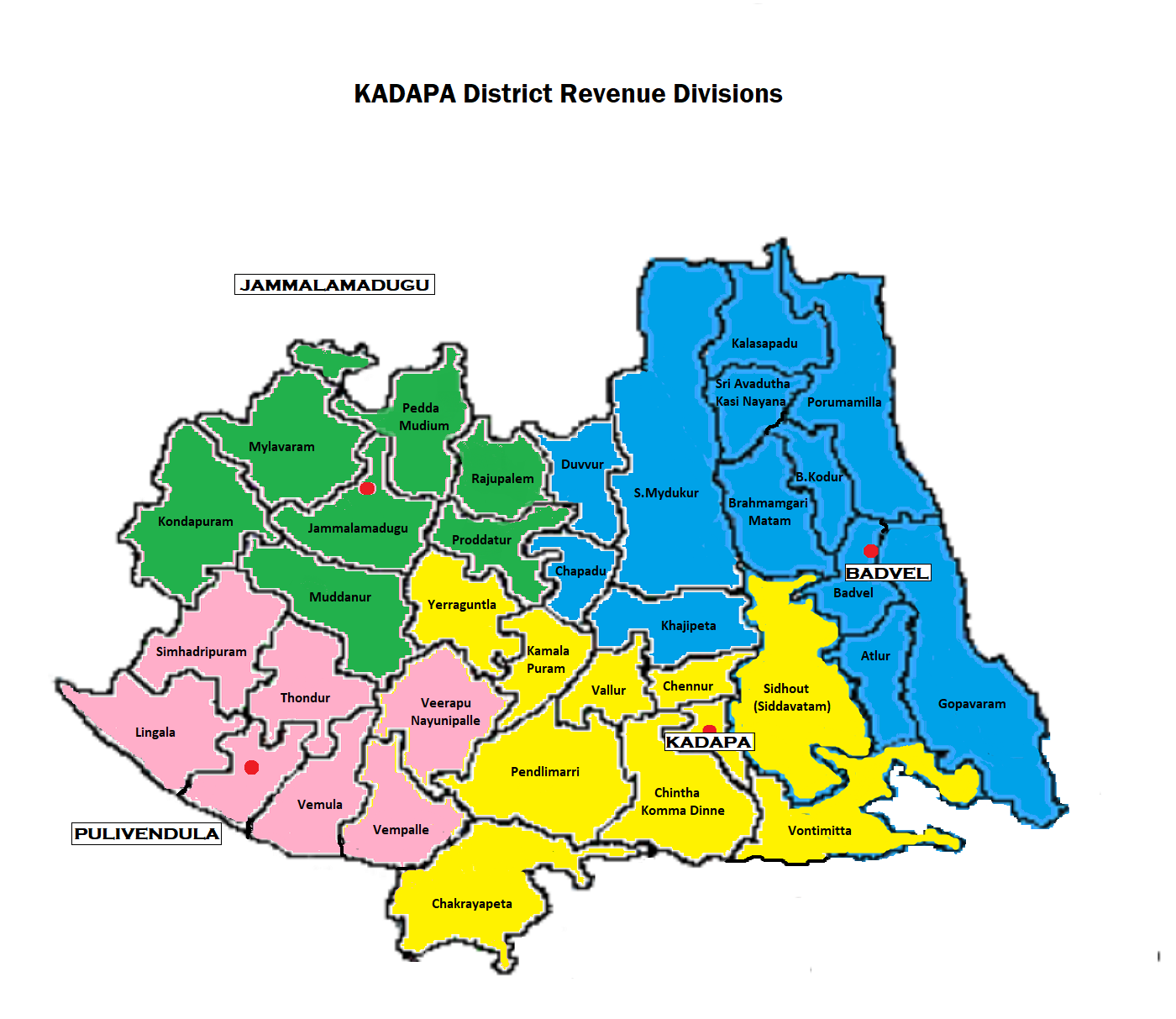
- Jammalamadugu revenue division in YSR district
- Country: India
- State: Andhra Pradesh
- District: Kadapa
- Headquarters: Jammalamadugu

Jammalamadugu revenue division (or Jammalamadugu division) is an administrative division in the Kadapa district of the Indian state of Andhra Pradesh. It is one of the 5 revenue divisions in the district which consists of 10 mandals under its administration. Proddatur is the largest town in Jammalamadugu revenue division.

== History ==
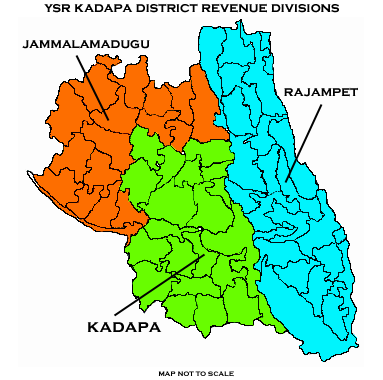
Jammalamadugu revenue division before April 2022

Jammalamadugu is the administrative headquarters of the division.In this division, Proddatur is the old municipality which became municipality in 1915, presently upgraded as a special grade municipality. Pulivendula became municipality in 2008.

== Administration ==
The 9 mandals in division are:.

Mandals	Jammalamadugu, Kondapuram, Muddanur, Mylavaram, Peddamudium, Chapadu, Duvvur, Proddatur, Rajupalem .

== See also ==
- List of revenue divisions in Andhra Pradesh
- List of mandals in Andhra Pradesh
- Kadapa district
- Kadapa revenue division
- Badvel revenue division
- Pulivendala revenue division
- Rajampeta revenue division
