= National Highway 67 (India) =

National highway in India

National Highway 67
- Map of the National Highway in red

Route information
- Length: 814 km (506 mi)

Major junctions
- EAST end: Krishnapatnam Port
- WEST end: Ramanagara

Location
- Country: India
- States: Andhra Pradesh, Karnataka
- Primary destinations: Dharwad, Hubballi, Gadag, Hosapete, Ballari, Guntakal, Gooty, Bugga, Kolimigundla, Jammalamadugu, Proddatur, Mydukur, Badvel, Buchireddypalem, Nellore, Krishnapatnam Port

Highway system
- Roads in India; Expressways; National; State; Asian
← NH 748	→ NH 16

National Highway 67 (NH 67, previously National Highway 63) is a major National Highway in India. It starts at Ramnagar on NH 748, Belagavi - Panjim Road of Karnataka and ends at Krishnapatnam Port road in Andhra Pradesh.

Currently four laning works going on between Badvel and Nellore. Four laning works between Jammalamadugu and Mydukur completed. NHAI called tenders for two laning between Gooty and Tadipatri.

4 Lane work is in Progress between Hubballi and Hosapete, 6 Lane work between Hosapete and Ballari and 4 lane work between Ballari and Karnataka - Andhra Pradesh Border.

== Route ==
NH-67 passes through the cities of Dharwad, Hubballi, Gadag, Koppal, Hosapete, Ballari in Karnataka and Guntakal, Gooty, Jammalamadugu, Proddatur, Mydukur, Badvel, Marripadu, Nellore, Krishnapatnam Port of Andhra Pradesh.

=== Route length in states ===
- Karnataka - 400 km (250 mi)
- Andhra Pradesh – 414 km (257 mi)

== Junctions ==
NH 748 near Londa
NH 48 near Dharwad.
NH 52 near Hubballi.
NH 76 (Gadag-Kotturu-Rayadurgam-Kanekal-Guntakal) near Gadag.
NH 50 near Hosapete.
NH 74 (Birur-Davangere-Kotturu-Hosapete-Sindhanur-Raichur) near Hosapete.
NH 42 near Joladarasi.
NH 44 near Gooty.
NH 544D near Tadipatri.
NH 716 near Muddanur.
NH 716G near Muddanur.
NH 40 near Mydukur.
NH 167B near Mydukur.
NH 565 near Kothulakonda.
NH 16 near Nellore

== See also ==
- List of national highways in India
- National Highway 66 (India)
