= National Highway 167B (India) =

National highway in India

National Highway 167B
- Map of the National Highway in red

Route information
- Length: 195 km (121 mi)

Major junctions
- South end: Mydukuru
- North end: Singarayakonda

Location
- Country: India
- States: Andhra Pradesh

Highway system
- Roads in India; Expressways; National; State; Asian
← NH 67	→ NH 16

National Highway 167B, commonly called NH 167B is a national highway in India. It is a spur road of National Highway 67. NH-167B traverses the state of Andhra Pradesh in India. The tenders for phase 1 of this road project covering a road length of 40 km from singarayakonda to malakonda (local shrine of sri lakshmi narasimha swamy) have been called on 21 June 2021 under Morth annual highway laying plan with a budget outlay of approximately 700crores. A bypass at Kandukur is planned to avoid outbound traffic into town. Works will begin shortly after finalisation of contract work.

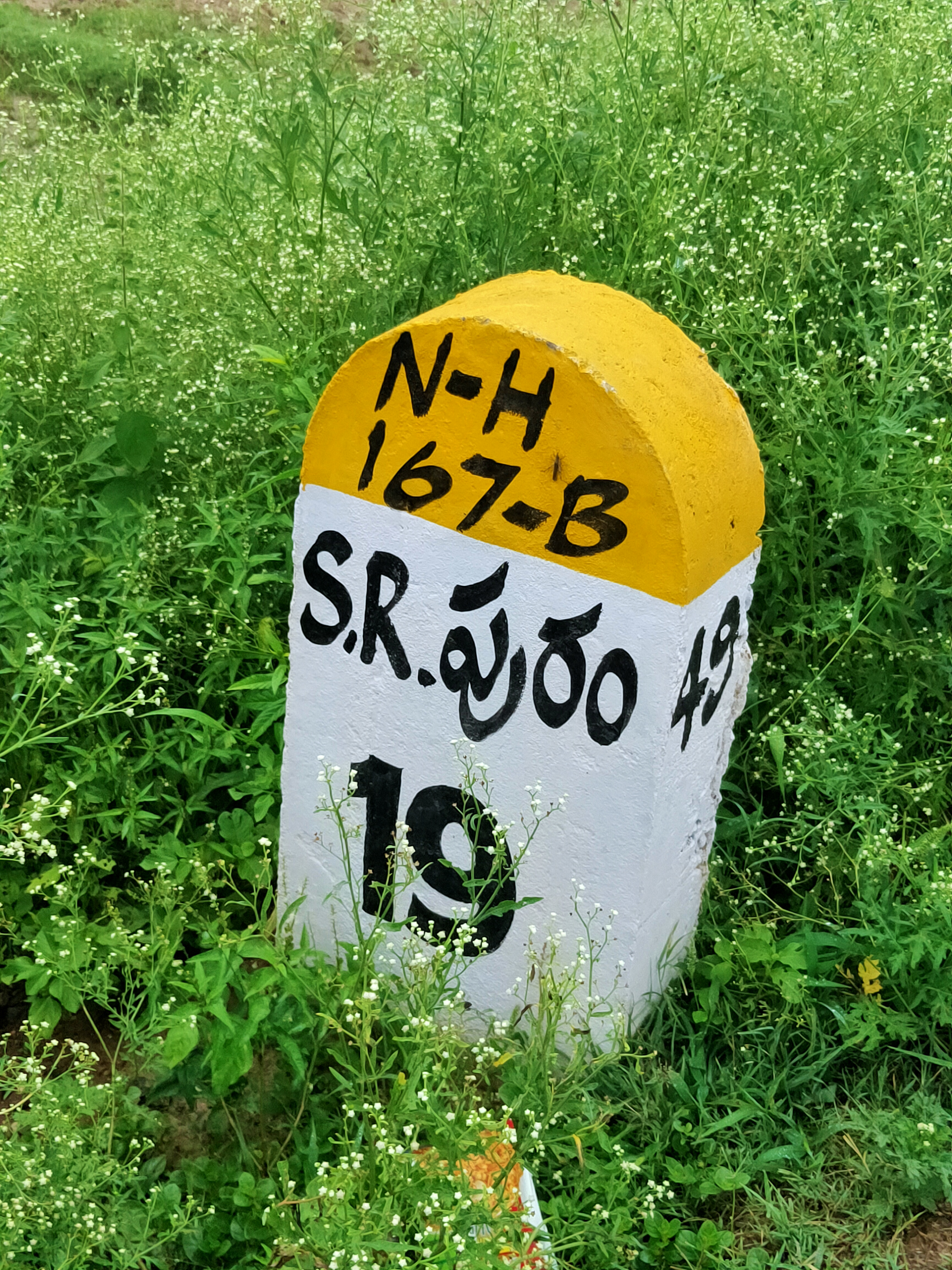

== Route ==
Mydukuru, Onipenta, Porumamilla, Kammavaripalli, Rajasaheb Peta, Tekurpeta, Seetharamapuram, Kothapalli, Ambavaram, Ganeshunipalli, Darsi Gunta Peta, Chandrasekharapuram, Kovilampadu, Khamampadu, Bookapuram, Tumalgunta, Pamuru, Nuchupoda, Inimerla, Lakshmi Narsapuram, Mopadu, Botlagudur, Ayyavaripalli, Malakonda, Chundi Ayyavaripalli, Chundi, Valetivaripalem, Pokuru, Nukavaram, Badevaripalem, Bonthavaripalem, Cherlopalem, Kandukur, Malyadri Colony, Oguru, Kanumalla, Singarayakonda

== Junctions ==
NH 67 Terminal near Mydukuru.
NH 565 near Pamur.
NH 16 Terminal at Singarayakonda.

== See also ==
- List of national highways in India
- List of national highways in India by state
