= Gadeguduru =

Gadegudur
- Village
- Interactive map of Gadegudur
- Location in Andhra Pradesh, India Gadegudur (India)
- Coordinates: 14°53′56″N 78°35′14″E
- Country: India
- State: Andhra Pradesh
- District: Kadapa
- Mandal: Rajupalem

Population (2014)
  - Total: 3,000

Languages
  - Official: Telugu
- Time zone: UTC+5:30 (IST)
- PIN: 516359

Gadegudur is a village in Kadapa district of the Indian state of Andhra Pradesh. It is located in Rajupalem mandal of Proddatur constitution and Jammalamadugu division.
