= Rajampeta revenue division =

Coordinates: 15°54′N 80°40′E

- revenue division in Kadapa district
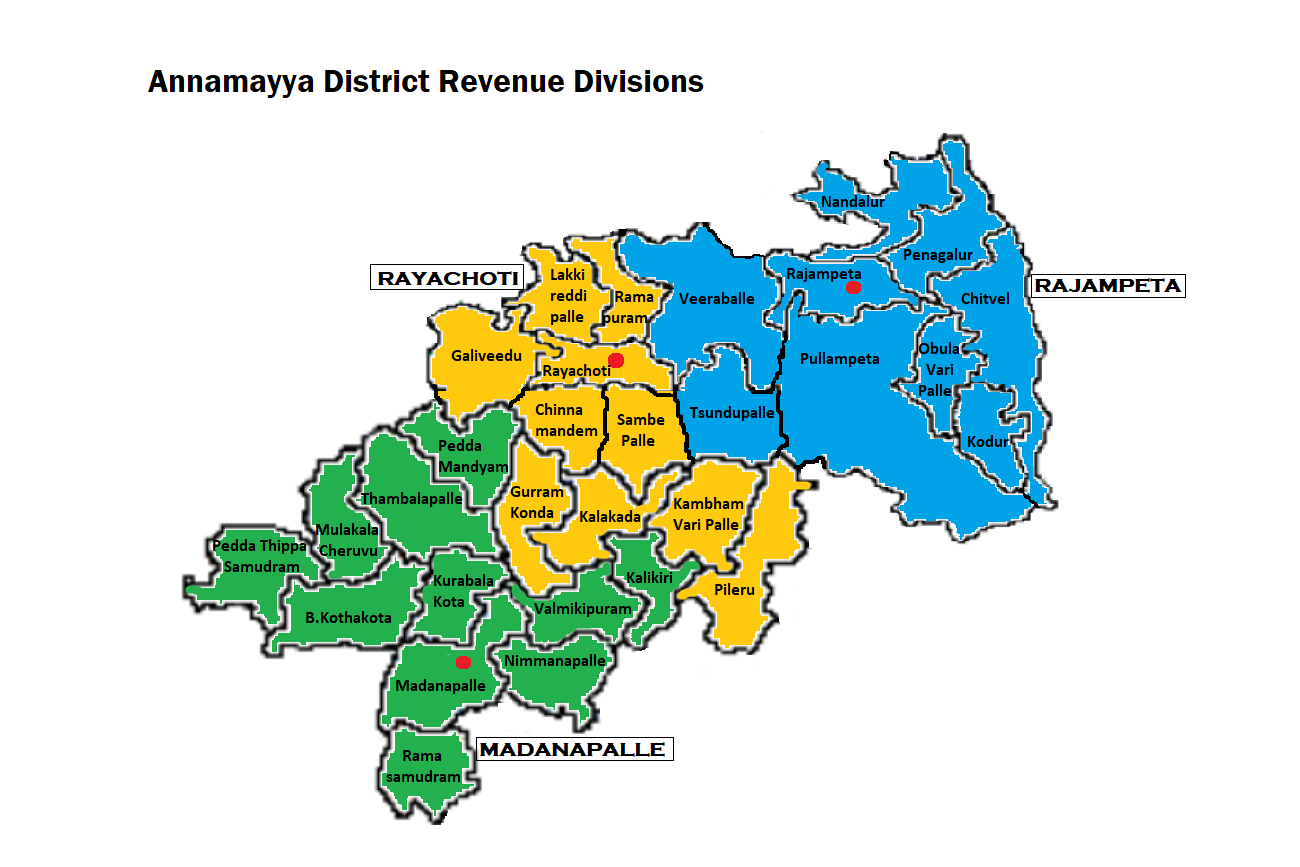
- Rajampeta revenue division in erst while Annamayya district
- Country: India
- State: Andhra Pradesh
- District: Kadapa
- Headquarters: Rajampeta
- Time zone: UTC+05:30 (IST)

Rajampeta revenue division (or Rajampeta division) is an administrative division in the Kadapa district of the Indian state of Andhra Pradesh. This Rajampeta Division has more than 100 years of history, formed during British Rule in 19th century following the cession of the. It is one of the five revenue divisions in the district which consists of four mandals under its administration (after bifurcation of kadapa/annamayya districts in December 2025). Rajampeta is the administrative headquarters of the division. The division is known for cultivation of horticulture crops including banana, chikoo, lemon, mango and papaya. Before 2021, it was one of large revenue division in Kadapa district that includes Rajampeta, Railway Koduru and Badvel Constituencies. Present the division has only four mandals namely Rajampeta, Nandalur, T Sundupalli, Veeraballi.

== History ==
This Rajampeta Division has maintained its prominence for over 100 years, serving as a key administrative hub in the southern part of the district, it was formed during British Rule in 19th century following the cession of the territory by the Nizam of Hyderabad to the East India Company in 1800. The division, along with its counterpart Madanapalle, has been a prominent administrative unit since that era, often administered by Sub-Collectors.

Before 2021, it was one of large revenue division in Kadapa district that includes Rajampeta, Railway Koduru and Badvel Constituencies. Earlier in the year 2021, Rajampeta revenue division was bifurcated into two divisions namely Rajampeta Revenue Division (included Rajampeta and Railway Koduru Constituencies) and a new Badvel Revenue Division (included Badvel Constituency from Rajampeta Revenue Division and Mydukuru from Jammalamadugu Revenue Division). Later again in the year 2022, Vontimitta and Siddavatam Mandals of Rajampeta Revenue Division were merged with Kadapa Revenue Division (Kadapa District) as a part of new districts creation and remaining Mandals of Rajampeta Revenue Division were merged in new Annamayya District. Again in the year 2025, the all mandals in Railway Koduru Constituency (whole constituency) were merged in Tirupati District as a part of districts reorganization leaving only four mandals in Rajampeta Revenue Division namely Rajampeta, Nandalur, T Sundupalli, Veeraballi.

Initial Setup (1800-1807): Upon taking control, the British established the Ceded Districts, with Sir Thomas Munro appointed as the Principal Collector in 1800. The area now known as Rajampeta was part of the large Cuddapah (Kadapa) district established during this time.

Significance of Rajampet: The region emerged as an important revenue division due to its agricultural, commercial, and forest resources (including Red Sanders).

Subdivision Development: While the district was formed in the early 1800s, the specific administrative division of Rajampeta (sometimes referred to as part of the sub-collectorate or taluk structure) was solidified during the implementation of the Ryotwari System, which gained traction in the region after 1820.

Administrative Significance: By the late 19th and early 20th century, the British administrative records show Rajampet as an important taluk and a part of the revenue structure designed for taxation, which later evolved into a formal revenue division.

Sub-Collectorate: The region was a large, historically significant division often headed by a Sub-Collector.

== Administration ==
The four mandals in division are:

| Mandals | Nandalur, Rajampeta, Veeraballi, T. Sundupalle. |

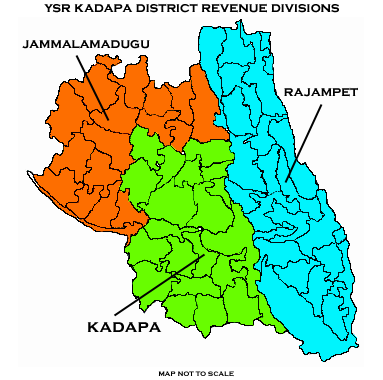
Rajampeta revenue division when it was part of Kadapa district until April 2022

== See also ==
- List of revenue divisions in Andhra Pradesh
- List of mandals in Andhra Pradesh
