= Kadapa mandal =

- Mandal
- Interactive map of Kadapa mandal
- Location in Andhra Pradesh, India
- Coordinates: 14.47°N 78.82°E
- Country: India
- State: Andhra Pradesh
- District: YSR Kadpa
- Headquarters: Kadapa

Population (2011)
  - Total: 318,916

Languages
  - Official: Telugu
- Time zone: UTC+5:30 (IST)
- Vehicle registration: AP

Kadapa mandal is one of the 36 mandals in Kadapa district of the Indian state of Andhra Pradesh. It is administered under Kadapa revenue division and its headquarters are located at Kadapa. The mandal is bounded by Chennur, Sidhout and Chinthakommadinne mandals.

== Towns and villages ==
Kadapa mandal consists of Kadapa Municipal Corporation and its urban agglomerations. It is fully an urban mandal and has no villages.

== See also ==
- List of mandals in Andhra Pradesh
