= Raja Babu =

Raja Babu or Rajababu (lit. 'Mr. Raja') may refer to:

- Raja Babu (actor) (1937–1983), Indian actor
- Raja Babu (film), a 1994 Indian Hindi-language film starring Govinda
- Rajababu (film), a 2006 Indian Telugu-language film starring Rajasekhar
- Rajababu: The Power, a 2015 Bangladeshi film starring Shakib Khan
- Raja Babu (2004 film), a 2004 Indian Bengali-language film

== See also ==
- Raja Sahib, an Indian noble title
  - Raja Sahib of Mahmudabad, title of the taluqdars of the Mahmudabad Estate in India
  - Raja Saheb of Aheri, title of Raje Vishveshvar Rao
  - Rajasaheb Pet, place in Andhra Pradesh, India
- Raja Saab (lit. 'Lord Raja'), a 1969 Indian Hindi-language film by Suraj Prakash, starring Shashi Kapoor
- The Raja Saab, a 2025 Indian Telugu-language horror film by Maruthi, starring Prabhas
