= Peddur =

Peddur may refer to:

- Pedduru, Kadapa district, a village in Kadapa district, Andhra Pradesh, India
- Peddur, Mahabubnagar district, a village in Mahabubnagar district, Telangana, India
- Pedduri, is a surname of some people living in Andhra Pradesh and Telangana.
