= Korrapadu =

Korrapadu may refer to:

- Korrapadu, Kadapa, village in Kadapa district, Andhra Pradesh, India
- Korrapadu, Guntur, village in Guntur district, Andhra Pradesh, India
