= Dammanapalli =

Village in India

Coordinates: 14°55′N 79°02′E

Dammannapalli is a village in the Kadapa district of Andhra Pradesh, India 3 kilometres (1.9 mi) from Porumamilla. It is part of the Badvel Assembly constituency and the Kadapa Parliamentary constituency.

== History ==
During the Rampa Rebellion of 1922, Alluri Sitarama Raju killed several British police officers in the area around Dammannapalli.
