= Garalamadugu =

- Village
- Interactive map of Garalamadugu
- Location in Andhra Pradesh, India
- Coordinates: 14.1017°N 79.2056°E
- Country: India
- State: Andhra Pradesh
- District: Tirupati
- Mandal: Pullampeta
- Talukas: Pullampet

Languages
  - Official: Telugu
- Time zone: UTC+5:30 (IST)
- PIN: 516107
- Vehicle registration: AP

Garalamadugu is a village in Pullampeta mandal, Tirupati district of the Indian state of Andhra Pradesh. The Village is popularly known as Malluvari Palli. It is located in Pullampeta mandal of Rajampeta revenue division. In this village there are nearly 150 houses.

== Demographics ==
Garalamadugu has a population of 505 as of 2011 census, of which males constitute 261, and females 244. Literacy rate stands at 63.33%.
