= Kadapa (disambiguation) =

Kadapa is a city in the Rayalseema region of the south-central part of Andhra Pradesh, India.

Kadapa may refer to:

- Kadapa (Lok Sabha constituency)
- Kadapa (Assembly constituency)
- Kadapa Airport
- Kadapa revenue division
- Kadapa district
- Kadapa railway station
