= Kumpinipuram =

Kumpinipuram కుంఫిణీపురం
- Village
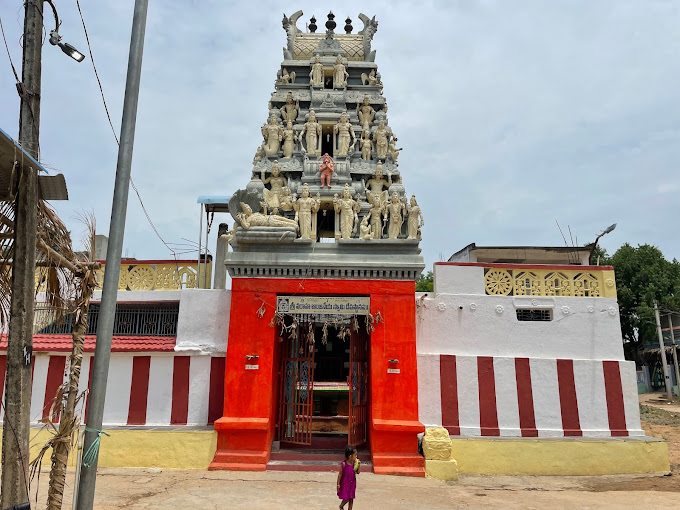
- Sri Bhoga Anjaneya Swamy Temple
- Interactive map of Kumpinipuram
- Location in Kadapa, Andhra Pradesh, India
- Coordinates: 14.336°N 79.226°E
- Country: India
- State: Andhra Pradesh
- District: Annamayya
- Mandal: Nandalur

Government
  - Body: Rajampet Municipality
  - M.L.A: Akepati Amarnath Reddy
  - M.P: P. V. Midhun Reddy

Languages
  - Official: Telugu language
- Time zone: UTC+5:30 (IST)
- PIN: 516151
- Kadapa code: 08562
- Vehicle registration: AP 04

Kumpinipuram is a small village in the Nandalur mandalam, Rajampet taluka of Kadapa district, in the Rayalaseema region of Andhra Pradesh, India. There are two temples in the village, these are: Sri Bhoga Anjaneya Swamy Temple, and Sri Sri Sri Ragvendra Swami Matta Gosala.
