= Kadapa revenue division =

Coordinates: 15°54′N 80°40′E

- Revenue division in YSR district
- Interactive map of Kadapa revenue division
- Country: India
- State: Andhra Pradesh
- District: YSR Kadapa

Kadapa revenue division (or Kadapa division) is an administrative division in the Kadapa district of the Indian state of Andhra Pradesh. It is one of the 5 revenue divisions in the district which consists of 9 mandals under its administration. Kadapa is the administrative headquarters of the division.

== Administration ==
The 9 mandals in division are:

Mandals	Chennur, Chinthakomma Dinne, Kadapa, Kamalapuram, Pendlimarri, Vallur, Sidhout, Vontimitta, Yerraguntla

== See also ==
- List of revenue divisions in Andhra Pradesh
- List of mandals in Andhra Pradesh
- Kadapa district
- Jammalamadugu revenue division
- Badvel revenue division
- Pulivendula revenue division
