= National Highway 748 (India) =

National highway in India

National Highway 748
- Map of National Highway 748 in red
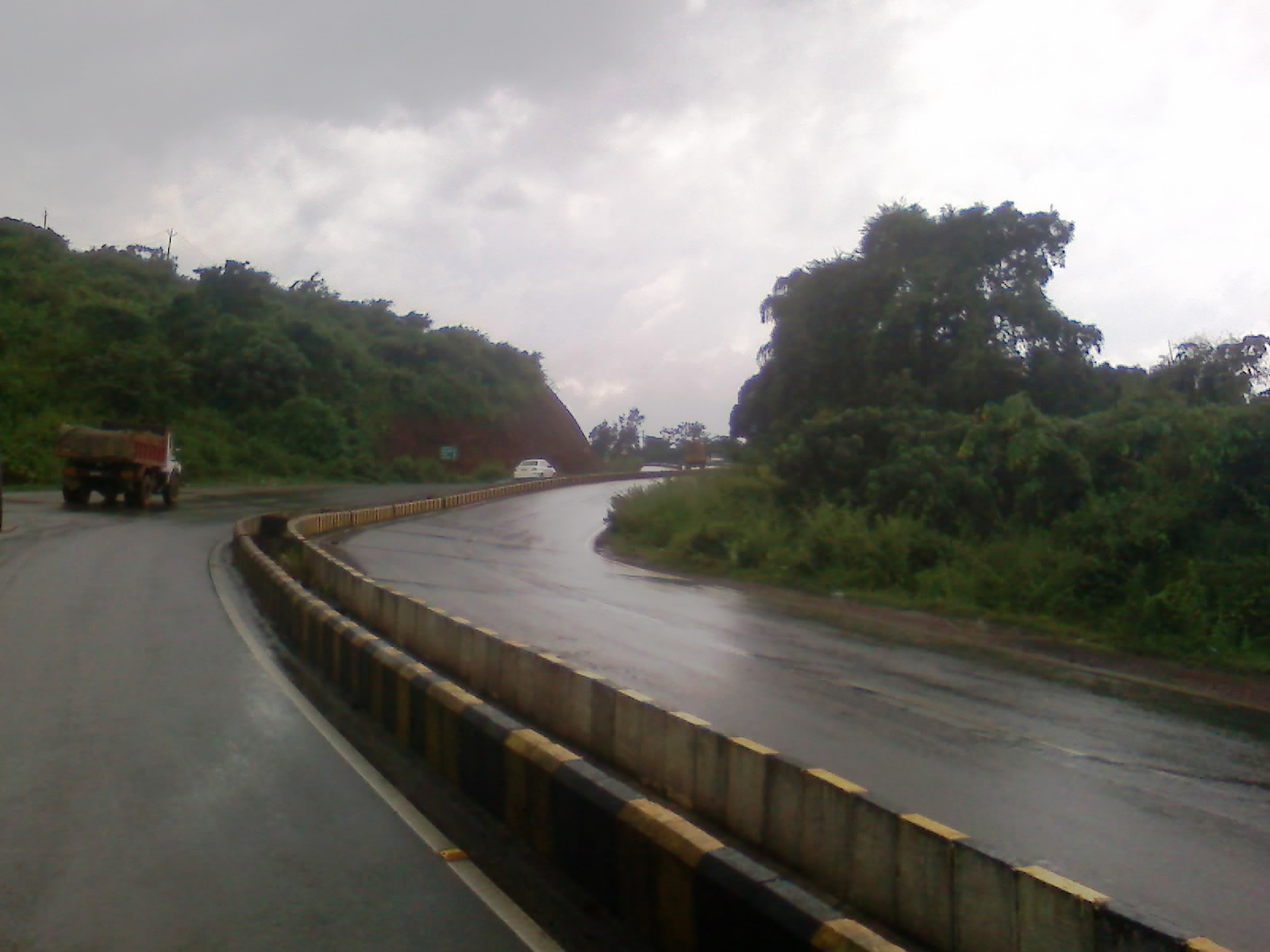
- NH 748 near Old Goa

Route information
- Auxiliary route of NH 48
- Length: 160 km (99 mi) Phase III: 153 km (95 mi)

Major junctions
- East end: Belgaum, Karnataka
- NH 67 Ramnagar NH 566 Ponda
- West end: Panaji, North Goa, Goa

Location
- Country: India
- States: Karnataka: 82 km (51 mi); Goa: 71 km (44 mi)
- Primary destinations: Anmod – Ponda

Highway system
- Roads in India; Expressways; National; State; Asian
← NH 48	→ NH 66

National Highway 748 (NH 748) is a National Highway in India that starts from Belgaum in Karnataka and ends at Panaji in North Goa district. Panaji to Belgaum highway via mollem and anmod ghat road condition. 153 km (95 mi) long, of which 82 km (51 mi) is in Karnataka and 71 km (44 mi) is in Goa. It is a spur road of National Highway 48.

== Route ==
NH48 near Belgaum, Anmod, Ponda, NH66 near Panaji.

== Junctions ==
NH 48 Terminal near Belgaum.
NH 748AA near Machhe.
NH 67 near Ramnagar.
NH 566 near Ponda.
NH 66 Terminal near Bijapur.

== See also ==
- List of national highways in India
- List of national highways in India by state
- National Highways Development Project
