= MallePalli =

Coordinates: 18°35′N 80°54′E

MallePalli is a village located in Kakinada district, Gandepalli Mandal, in the state of Andhra Pradesh in India. It has a population of 12,000 people. Total voters in Mallepalli are around 7,500.
