= Vallur mandal =

Vallur
- Mandal
- Interactive map of Vallur
- Country: India
- State: Andhra Pradesh
- District: YSR Kadapa
- Revenue Division: Kadapa

Languages
  - Official: Telugu
- Time zone: UTC+5:30 (IST)
- Vehicle registration: AP

Vallur is a mandal in YSR Kadapa district of Andhra Pradesh, India. It is part of the Kadapa revenue division.
