= Tangatur =

Tangutur Tanguturu
- Village
- Interactive map of Tangutur
- Location in Andhra Pradesh, India
- Coordinates: 15.3393°N 80.0397°E
- Country: India
- State: Andhra Pradesh
- District: Kadapa district

Languages
  - Official: Telugu
- Time zone: UTC+5:30 (IST)
- Vehicle registration: AP-
- Nearest city: Ongole
- Sex ratio: 51:49 ♂/♀
- Lok Sabha constituency: Kadapa

Tangutur is a village in Kadapa district, Andhra Pradesh, India near Proddatur and Ongole in India.
