= Arakatavemula =

- Village
- Interactive map of Arakatavemula
- Location in Andhra Pradesh, India
- Coordinates: 14.882256°N 78.539855°E
- Country: India
- State: Andhra Pradesh
- District: Kadapa

Population (2011)
  - Total: 2,929

Languages
  - Official: Telugu
- Time zone: UTC+5:30 (IST)
- PIN: 516359
- Telephone code: 08564
- Vehicle registration: AP

Arakatavemula is a village located in Rajupalem Mandal of YSR District, Andhra Pradesh, India. Surrounding villages for Arakatavemula village are Parlapdu (West), Kummara palle (North), Pottipadu (South) and Somapuram (East).

== Demographics ==
According to the Census 2011, the population of Arakatavemula village is 2,929, comprising 1,463 males and 1,466 females. The village has 369 children aged 0–6, accounting for 12.60% of the total population. The average sex ratio in Arakatavemula is 1,002, which is higher than the Andhra Pradesh state average of 993. Additionally, the village's literacy rate is higher than the state average. In 2011, the literacy rate in Arakatavemula was 68.59%, compared to Andhra Pradesh’s 67.02%. Specifically, male literacy in Arakatavemula stands at 80.43%, while female literacy is 57.35%.
