= Chilamkur =

Chilamakur చిలమకూరు Chilamkur, Chilamakuru
- Revenue Village
- Location in Andhra Pradesh, India Chilamakur (India)
- Coordinates: 14.647626°N 78.469000°E
- Country: India
- State: Andhra Pradesh
- District: Kadapa
- Mandal: Yerraguntla

Government
  - Type: Andhra Pradesh Government
- Elevation: 152 m (499 ft)

Population (Population (2011))
  - Total: 11,239

Languages
  - Official: Telugu Urdu
- Time zone: UTC+5:30 (IST)
- PIN: 516310

Chilamakur is a village in the Kadapa district of Andhra Pradesh, India. It falls under the Yerraguntla mandal in the Kadapa revenue division. The village is an industrial hub in the Kadapa district and is home to the Sri Agasteswara Swamy temple, one of the oldest temples in the area, which has been recognized by the Archaeological Survey of India (ASI).

As per the 2011 Census of India, Chilamakur had a population of 11,239, with 5,601 males and 5,638 females. The village comprised 2,743 households.

== Education ==
Primary and secondary education in Chilamakur is managed by the Government of Andhra Pradesh under the School Education Department. The medium of instruction in schools is primarily Telugu and English.

- Zilla Parishad High School: Established in 1987 by the Government of Andhra Pradesh, it enrolls over 500 students.
- Mandal Parishad Primary Schools: Chilamakur has four Mandal Parishad Primary schools, all funded and managed by the Mandal Parishad. These are located near Ramalayam temple, Church Old Village, Harijanawada, and near the Sai Baba temple.
- Private Schools: There are four private schools, namely:
  - St. Ann's English Medium High School, run by India Cements Ltd.
  - Ushoday Upper Primary School
  - Sri Sai Public School
  - Sri Vivekananda High School
- Anganwadi Centres: Chilamakur also has four Anganwadi schools providing early childhood education.

== Medical facilities ==
Chilamakur is served by a government-run Primary Health Centre (PHC), operational 24 hours a day and catering to ten nearby villages. The health centre is staffed by a doctor, four auxiliary nurse midwives (ANMs), a paramedical professional, and a medical representative.

In addition, the village has a veterinary clinic.

== Water and power supply ==
The village is currently in the process of establishing a protected drinking water supply through taps. Hand pumps provide water year-round, with additional drinking water sourced from a local pond.

Chilamakur has an electricity supply for household needs, with seven hours of power allocated for agriculture and ten hours for commercial purposes.

== Land use ==
The land in Chilamakur is categorized as follows:

- Forest: 263 hectares
- Non-agricultural land: 197 hectares
- Barren land: 600 hectares
- Agricultural land: 1,738 hectares
- Non-irrigated land: 1,485 hectares

== Industries ==
Chilamakur hosts several industries, with India Cements Limited (formerly Coromandel Cements) being a major employer in the village. Nearby industrial facilities include:

- Rayalaseema Thermal Power Project (8 km north)
- India Cements Limited, Yerraguntla (7 km east)
- Zuari Cements, Yerraguntla (11 km south)
- Bharathi Cements, Kamalapuram (15 km east)
- Penna Cements, Tadipatri (65 km west)

== Banking services ==
The village is served by several banking institutions, including:

- State Bank of India (IFSC: SBIN0007514)
- Syndicate Bank (IFSC: SYNB0003210)
- Andhra Pragathi Grameena Bank (IFSC: APGB002067)
- State Bank of India Customer Service Point (CSP Code: 1A830795)

== Government services ==
Chilamakur residents have access to the following services:

- Mee Seva Centres: These centres provide a range of government-to-citizen (G2C) and government-to-business (G2B) services under the National eGovernance Plan.
- APSRTC Reservation Counter: Facilitates booking of tickets for APSRTC buses.
- IRCTC Authorized Agency: Offers railway ticket booking services.
- Digital Seva (Common Services Centers): These centres provide digital services to rural areas under the Digital India initiative.

== Transportation ==
Chilamakur is located on the Ballary-Nellore Road (SH31), which connects the village to major cities and towns.

=== Roadways ===
Over 250 bus services operate through Chilamakur, managed by APSRTC. Direct bus services are available to nearby towns such as Proddatur, Kadapa, and Tirupati, as well as cities like Bengaluru and Vijayawada. Services to Ballary and Bengaluru are provided by NEKRTC.

=== Railways ===
The nearest railway station is Yerraguntla Junction Railway Station, located nearby.

=== Airways ===
The closest airport is Kadapa Airport, which provides regional connectivity.
