= Amagampalli =

- Village
- Interactive map of Amagampalli
- Location in Andhra Pradesh, India Amagampalli (India)
- Coordinates: 17.218886°N 81.748278°E
- Country: India
- State: Andhra Pradesh
- District: Kadapa

Languages
  - Official: Telugu
- Time zone: UTC+5:30 (IST)

Amagampalli is a small village in Sri Avadhuth Kasinayana mandal, Kadapa district, Andhra Pradesh.

In April 2024, former Andhra Pradesh chief minister YS Rajasekhar Reddy's daughter YS Sharmila started her poll campaign for the Congress party from Amagampalli.
