= Sri Venkateswara Veterinary College =

College of Veterinary Science, Proddatur
- Type: Veterinary
- Established: 2008
- Undergraduates: 60
- Location: Proddatur, Andhra Pradesh, India; 14°47′51″N 78°33′43″E
- Website: http://svvu.edu.in/CvscProddatur.html

Sri Venkateswara Veterinary College also known as College of Veterinary Sciences, Proddatur is established in 2008 in Proddatur by Y. S. Raja Sekhara Reddy, in the Indian state of Andhra Pradesh.

== Overview ==
The Government of Andhra Pradesh established a new Veterinary College at Proddatur, Kadapa district. The college started functioning from the premises of Proddutur Co-Operative Milk Producers Union, Proddutur from the academic year 2008–09 with an admittance of 31 students into the first year B.V.Sc & A.H course. The Veterinary Council of India, New Delhi has granted recognition to the college and the number of seats in BVSc & AH has been increased to 60 from 30 from the Academic year 2014–15.
