= Kesalingayapalli =

Village in India

Kesalingayapalli is one of the old villages in Mydukur Mandal, Kadapa District, Andhra Pradesh, India.

== History ==
The village became known in local news for barring non-Hindus from visiting there, especially in response to Christian missionaries. To warn said missionaries from attempting to convert the locals, saffron flags and signboards were added on the entrances on Ram Navami, 2016.

Although the locals assured that non-Hindus can still visit as long as they do not evangelise, the public declaration of Kesalingayapalli as a "Hindus-only village" made non-Hindus from nearby towns more wary of them.

== Population ==
This village has around 250 families. Most of the residents are Balijas.

== Religion ==
There are two large temples in Kesalingayapalli: Gangamma Devalayam and Ramalayam.

The Aikya Hindu Vedika, a Hindu nationalist group, funded the restoration of these temples and also distributed copies of the Bhagavad Gita for children to read every night. Pleased by their successful campaign, the Hindu Vedika also did similar policies in neighbouring villages.
