= Ramapuram, Duvvur mandal =

Ramapuram
- Village
- Interactive map of Ramapuram
- Location in Andhra Pradesh, India
- Coordinates: 14.8086°N 78.7081°E
- Country: India
- State: Andhra Pradesh
- District: YSR Kadapa
- Talukas: Ramapuram

Languages
  - Official: Telugu
- Time zone: UTC+5:30 (IST)
- PIN: 516175
- Vehicle registration: AP

Ramapuram is a hamlet in Kadapa district of the Indian state of Andhra Pradesh. It is located in Duvvur mandal of Badvel revenue division. The village has around 150 families with Ram temple, primary school. Kadapa is 44 km away.
