= Chinnapasupula =

Village in Andhra Pradesh, India

Coordinates: 14°55′N 78°26′E

Chinnapasupula is a small village of Peddamudium Block of Kadapa district in Andhra Pradesh, India. It is 8 km (5.0 mi) from Jammalamadugu Constituency. The village consists of nearly 500 people in population, of which about 370 are voters. The most common native language of Chinnapasupula is Telugu. Villages are completely depend on agriculture. In chinnapasupula village there are many temples and these temples have around 300 hundred acres of agriculture land donated by ancestors of this village. kunti Pulla Reddy is one of the famous personalities from this village.

== Education ==
So many well educated students are there in the village. In the village one MPP school is there to give education to poor students.
