= Kavalakuntla =

Coordinates: 15°03′N 79°02′E

Kavalakuntla is a village in the Porumamilla mandal of Andhra Pradesh, India. It is one of the sixteen villages that surround Porumamilla, and has nine schools, of which three are designated for females and six are designated for males.
