= Yerra Cheruvu Palli =

Yerra Cheruvu Palli Y C Palli
- village
- Interactive map of Yerra Cheruvu Palli
- Location in Andhra Pradesh, India
- Coordinates: 14.3216°N 79.1750°E
- Country: India
- State: Andhra Pradesh
- District: YSR Kadapa

Languages
  - Official: Telugu
- Time zone: UTC+5:30 (IST)

Yerra Cheruvu Palli or YC Palli is a small village located in Nandalur mandal YSR Kadapa district of Andhra Pradesh in India.
