= Dargah e Ghaffaria =

A Dargah (Persian: درگاہ) is a Sufi shrine built over the grave of a revered religious figure, often a Sufi saint. Local Muslims visit the shrine known as ziyarat. Dargahs are often associated with Sufi meeting rooms and hostels, known as khanqah. They often include a mosque, meeting rooms, schools (madrassas), residences for a teacher or caretaker, hospitals, and other buildings for community purposes. The term is derived from a Persian word which can mean, among other uses, "portal" or "threshold". Many Muslims believe that dargahs are portals by which they can invoke the deceased saint's intercession and blessing (see Tawassul).

== Dargah-e-Ghaffaria Quadiria ==
The dargah of the Sufi Saint Abdul Gaffar Sha lies in Kamalapuram, Kadapa district in Andhra Pradesh state, India.

The dargah encompasses the mausoleum of the Sufi Saint Ghaffar Shah Khadri and his Khalifa Dastagir and his Children:

1. Abdul Ghaffar Khan Khadri
2. Shaik Dasthagir Basha Khadri (Khalifa)
3. Shaik Khader Mohiuddin Khadri
4. Shaik Noor-un-nisa sahiba
5. Shaik Zahiruddin Khadri

Hazrat Abdul Ghaffar Khan Khadri had a son named Abdul Majid Khan and he had a son named Abdus Sattar Khan Khadri (buried in the premises of Dargah).

== See also ==
- Dargahs in Andhra Pradesh
