= Obulareddypeta =

Obul Reddy Peta
- Village
- Interactive map of Obul Reddy Peta
- Location in Andhra Pradesh Obul Reddy Peta (India)
- Coordinates: 14.698°N 78.695°E
- Country: India
- State: Andhra Pradesh
- District: Kadapa district
- Mandal: Chapadu

Language
  - Official: Telugu
- Time zone: UTC+5:30 (IST)

Obulareddypeta (or Obul Reddy Peta) is a village in a Chapadu mandal in Kadapa district in the Indian state of Andhra Pradesh.
