= Surabhi, Kadapa district =

Coordinates: 14.2143°N 78.5718°E

Surabhi is a village in Chakrayapet Block, Kadapa District (formerly Cuddapah), Andhra Pradesh, India.
