= Chinnaiahgaripalli =

- village
- Interactive map of Chinnaiahgaripalli
- Location in Andhra Pradesh, India Chinnaiahgaripalli (India)
- Coordinates: 14°44′43″N 78°46′1″E
- Country: India
- State: Andhra Pradesh
- District: kadapa

Languages
  - Official: Telugu
- Time zone: UTC+5:30 (IST)
- PIN: 516173
- Nearest city: Mydukur
- Lok Sabha constituency: Kadapa
- Vidhan Sabha constituency: Mydukur

Chinnaiahgaripalli (CG Palli or Chinnayyagaripalli) is a small village in Mydukur Mandal, Kadapa District, Andhra Pradesh, India. It is located in between Yellampalli and Settivari Palli. This is one of the villages in Settivari Palli panchayat. Agriculture is the main source of income and also one employee in every home.
