= Chinnayarasala Harijanawada =

ChinnaYarasala Harijanawada Yarasala Harijanawada
- Interactive map of ChinnaYarasala Harijanawada
- Location in Andhra Pradesh, India
- Coordinates: 14.987939°N 79.036487°E
- Country: India
- State: Andhra Pradesh
- District: Kadapa

Languages
  - Official: Telugu
- Time zone: UTC+5:30 (IST)
- PIN: 516505
- Telephone code: 08569
- Vehicle registration: AP 04

Chinna Yarasala Harijanawada is a small village in Kadapa district of the Indian state of Andhra Pradesh. It is located in Porumamilla mandal of Rajampeta revenue division.

== Education facilities ==
An elementary school is in Chinnayarasala Harijanawada

== Medical facilities ==
Primary Health Center is in TekurPeta, two kilometers away from the nearest medical center.

== Village photos ==
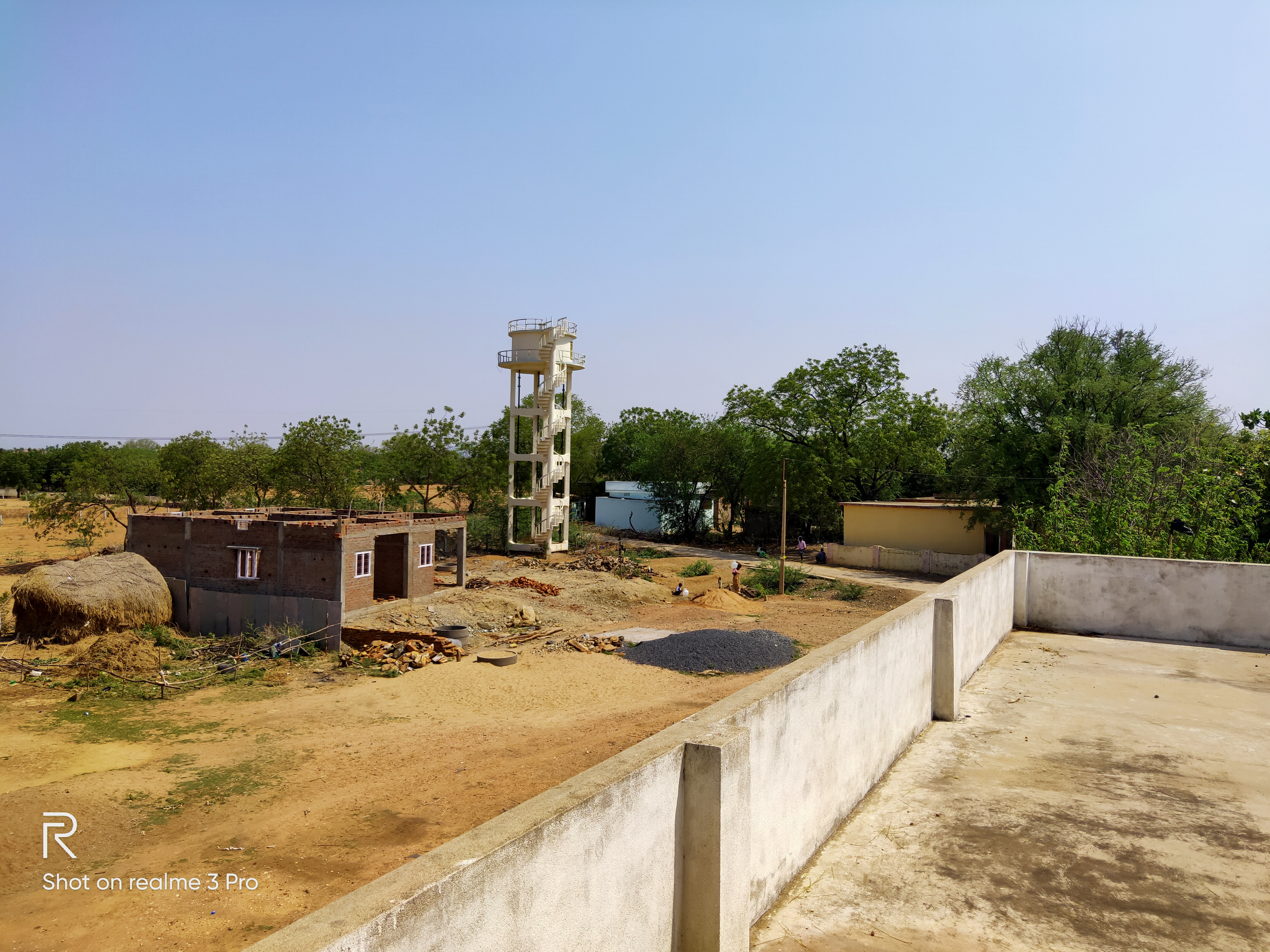

== See also ==
- Chinnayarasala Harijanawada village Ganesh festival video
