= Peddullapalli =

Peddullapalli is a panchayath in B. Kodur Madandal in YSR district (formerly Kadapa District) of Andhra Pradesh, India. The village has a population of 800.
