= Badvel revenue division =

Administrative division in Andhra Pradesh, India

Badvel Revenue Division
- revenue division in YSR district
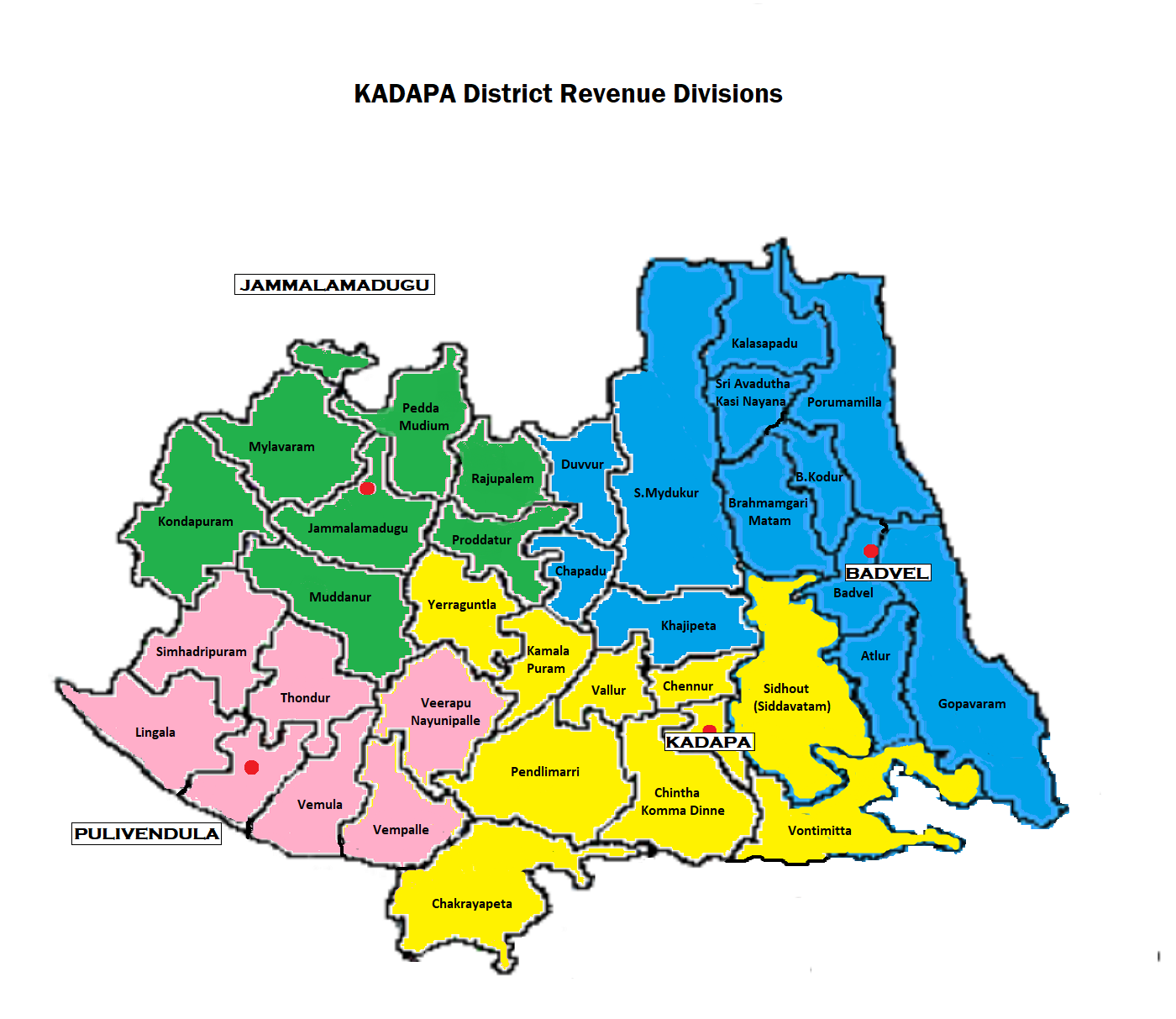
- Badvel revenue division in YSR district
- Country: India
- State: Andhra Pradesh
- District: Kadapa
- Formed: 21 December 2021 (Divided from Rajampeta Revenue Division)
- Founder: Government of Andhra Pradesh
- Headquarters: Badvel
- Time zone: UTC+05:30 (IST)

Badvel revenue division is an administrative division located in Kadapa district in the Indian state of Andhra Pradesh formed from Rajampeta Revenue Division in the year 2021. With Badvel as its administrative headquarters, it is one of the five revenue divisions in the district and has 10 mandals under its administration and it is the highest number of mandals in Kadapa district.

== History ==
In late September 2021, the government of Andhra Pradesh released a draft notification for the formation Badvel revenue division, shortly before the Election Commission of India is set to release bypoll election schedule for Badvel Assembly constituency enforcing the Model Code of Conduct, post which the government may not announce new projects and public initiatives. The revenue division was later formed on 22 December 2021, coinciding with the birthday of Y. S. Jagan Mohan Reddy, the incumbent Chief minister of Andhra Pradesh.

== Administration ==
Badvel revenue division has its administrative headquarters at Badvel and comprises 10 mandals: Atlur, B. Kodur, Brahmamgari Matham, Badvel, Gopavaram, Kalasapadu, Khajipet, Mydukur, Porumamilla and Sri Avadhutha Kasinayana.

== See also ==
- List of revenue divisions in Andhra Pradesh
- List of mandals in Andhra Pradesh
- Kadapa district
- Jammalamadugu revenue division
- Kadapa revenue division
- Pulivendula revenue division
- Rajampeta revenue division
