= Puttanavari Palli =

- village
- Interactive map of Puttanavari Palli
- Location in Andhra Pradesh, India Puttanavari Palli (India)
- Coordinates: 14.1388°N 79.2059°E
- Country: India
- State: Andhra Pradesh
- District: Tirupati
- Talukas: Pullampeta
- Elevation: 154 m (505 ft)

Languages
  - Official: Telugu
- Time zone: UTC+5:30 (IST)
- PIN: 516107

Puttanavari Palli is a village in Pullampeta mandal in Tirupati district in the state of Andhra Pradesh in India.

== See also ==
- Pullampeta
