= Velavali =

Coordinates: 14°50′N 78°37′E

Velavali is a village on the banks of the river Kundu in the Kadapa district of Andhra Pradesh, India, near Proddatur. The population of the village is approximately 3,200.
