= Himakuntla =

- Village
- Interactive map of Himakuntla
- Location in Andhra Pradesh, India Himakuntla (India)
- Coordinates: 14°4′54″N 78°25′28″E
- Country: India
- State: Andhra Pradesh
- District: Kadapa
  - Density: 200/km^{2} (520/sq mi)

Languages
  - Official: Telugu
- Time zone: UTC+5:30 (IST)
- PIN: 516454
- Telephone code: 08568 std code

Himakuntla is a village in Simhadripuram mandal, located in Kadapa district of the Indian state of Andhra Pradesh.
