= Peddapasupula =

Coordinates: 14°53′N 78°27′E

Peddapasupula Peddavasala
- village
- Interactive map of Peddapasupula
- Country: India
- State: Andhra Pradesh
- District: Kadapa
- Talukas: Jammalamadugu

Population
  - Total: 5,562

Languages
  - Official: Telugu
- Time zone: UTC+5:30 (IST)
- PIN: 516411

Peddapasupula is a village in Kadapa district, Andhra Pradesh, India.It is one of the biggest village and village panchayat in Kadapa district

== Geography ==
Peddapasupula is a village situated in Kadapa or Cuddapah (district), Andhra Pradesh, India. It has Postal Index Number 516411.

It is famous for Madhava Swamy temple, Which transferred from Gandikota to protect madhava swamy idol during British rule.
