= Gopavaram, Kadapa district =

Gopavaram
- Census Town
- Location in Andhra Pradesh, India
- Coordinates: 14°43′15″N 79°6′50″E
- Country: India
- State: Andhra Pradesh
- District: YSR

Languages
  - Official: Telugu
- Time zone: UTC+5:30 (IST)
- PIN: 516233
- Vehicle registration: AP

Gopavaram is a village in Kadapa district of the Indian state of Andhra Pradesh. It is located in Gopavaram mandal of Badvel revenue division.

== Education ==
The primary and secondary school education is imparted by government, aided and private schools, under the School Education Department of the state. The medium of instruction followed by different schools are English, Telugu.

== See also ==
- List of census towns in Andhra Pradesh
