= Pamuluru =

- Village
- Interactive map of Pamuluru
- Location in Andhra Pradesh, India Pamuluru (India)
- Coordinates: 14.4031°N 78.4247°E
- Country: India
- State: Andhra Pradesh
- District: Kadapa
- Talukas: Vempalle

Population (2011 Census)
  - Total: 1,371

Languages
  - Official: Telugu
- Time zone: UTC+5:30 (IST)
- PIN: 516350

Pamuluru is a village and panchayat in Kadapa district in the state of Andhra Pradesh in India.

== Population ==
The total population of the village is 1371 containing 669 male and 702 female.

== Education ==
It has a primary school, or elementary school and Z.P.H.S school, which are helpful in improving the literacy of the villages around. and secondary education also there
