= Siddayya Gari Matham =

Coordinates: 14.90666°N 78.92745°E

Siddayya Gari Matham is a shrine in Mudumala village of Brahmamgari Matam mandal, YSR Kadapa district in the state of Andhra Pradesh in India.
