= Pedda Orampadu =

Coordinates: 14°06′N 79°17′E

Pedda Orampadu is a village in Obulavaripalle mandal, Tirupati district, Andhra Pradesh, India.
