= Pathagollapalle =

- Village
- Country: India
- State: Andhra Pradesh
- District: Annamayya

Languages
  - Official: Telugu
- Time zone: UTC+5:30 (IST)

Pathagollapalle is a village in Annamayya district, located in Rayachoti mandal of Andhra Pradesh, India. The village is 3 kilometers far from Rayachoti. It has been recently added to the Rayachoti Municipality.
