= Kondam Palli =

Kondampalli is a village in Pullampet mandal, Tirupati district, Andhra Pradesh, India -516107
