= Bugga =

Pakistani village

- Village
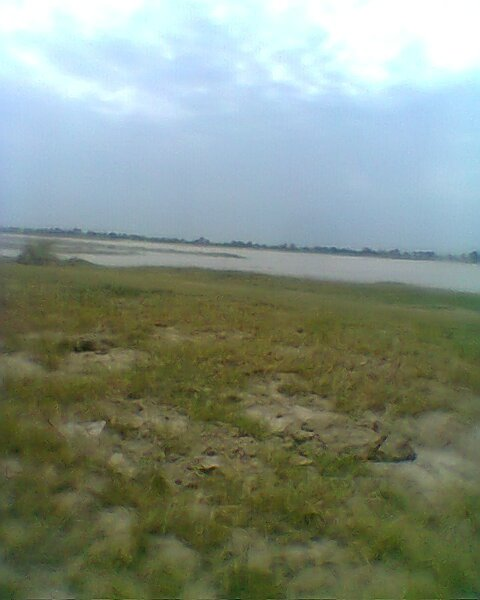
- Lands of Bugga on bank of River Jhelum

- Location in Pakistan
- Coordinates: 32°02′18″N 73°2′49″E
- Country: Pakistan
- Province: Punjab
- District: Jhelum

Bugga is a village in Pind Dadan Khan Tehsil of Jhelum District in Punjab, Pakistan. It is commonly known as Bugga Sharif, due to an ancient seminary and shrine of Bawa Shah Zinda, situated to the west of the present village.

== Overview ==
It is situated on the right bank of River Jhelum and 10 km from the M-2 motorway. Presently this area became a part of China-Pakistan Economic Corridor (CPEC). Bhera is also nearby to Bugga.
