= Rajasaheb Pet =

- Interactive map of Rajasaheb Pet
- Location in Andhra Pradesh, India
- Coordinates: 14.980425°N 79.031789°E
- Country: India
- State: Andhra Pradesh
- District: Kadapa

Languages
  - Official: Telugu
- Time zone: UTC+5:30 (IST)
- PIN: 516505
- Telephone code: 08569
- Vehicle registration: AP 04

Rajasaheb Pet is a small village in Kadapa district of the Indian state of Andhra Pradesh. It is located in Porumamilla mandal of Rajampeta revenue division. Its PIN code is 516505.

== Education facilities ==
There is an elementary school in RajasahebPet. Zilla Parishad High School is a high school for studying high school near Tekurpeta

== Medical facilities ==
The village has a primary health center for healing near Tekurpeta
