= Potladurthi =

- village
- Interactive map of Potladurthi
- Location in Andhra Pradesh, India Potladurthi (India)
- Coordinates: 14.4226°N 78.3248°E
- Country: India
- State: Andhra Pradesh
- District: Kadapa
- Talukas: Yerraguntla

Population (May 2011)
  - Total: 6,801

Languages
  - Official: Telugu
- Time zone: UTC+5:30 (IST)
- PIN: 516360

Potladurthi is a village in Kadapa district in the Indian state of Andhra Pradesh. Situated in the bank of Penna River on the way of Yeraaguntla and Proddatur road in the area of 4336 acres with the population around 8000 to 9000.

== Population and Demographics ==
As per the 2011 Census, Potladurthi has a population of 6,901 individuals residing in 1,711 households. The gender distribution includes 3,604 males and 3,297 females, resulting in a sex ratio of approximately 915 females for every 1,000 males. Children aged 0-6 years constitute about 10.72% of the population, totaling 740 children. CENSUS2011.CO.IN

== Literacy Rate ==
The village boasts a literacy rate of 67.08%, which is slightly higher than the state average of 67.02%. Male literacy stands at 78.19%, while female literacy is at 55.19%. CENSUS2011.CO.IN

== Social Composition ==
Scheduled Castes (SC) make up approximately 17.3% of the population, whereas Scheduled Tribes (ST) constitute about 0.1%. CENSUS2011.CO.IN

== Economy and Occupations ==
The primary occupations in Potladurthi include agriculture, handloom weaving, and work related to the Kadapa black stone mines. Commonly cultivated crops are groundnut, sunflower, and paddy. ONEFIVENINE

== Infrastructure and Amenities ==
The village is equipped with several amenities:

Education: There are multiple educational institutions, including three elementary schools, one Zilla Parishad high school, and six Anganwadi centers. ONEFIVENINE

Healthcare: Potladurthi houses a Primary Health Center (PHC) and a veterinary sub-center to cater to the medical needs of its residents. ONEFIVENINE

Infrastructure: The village has achieved 90% coverage in cement roads and pucca (permanent) houses. Additionally, there are two ration shops, a post office, and three protected water schemes ensuring clean drinking water. ONEFIVENINE

Community Services: A social welfare hostel for boys is present, along with 81 Self-Help Groups (SHGs) comprising about 800 women members, promoting community development and financial inclusion. ONEFIVENINE

== Cultural and Religious Sites ==
Potladurthi is home to approximately 20 temples, reflecting its rich cultural and religious heritage. ONEFIVENINE

== Connectivity ==
The village is well-connected by road, with the nearest town, Proddatur, located about 6 kilometers away. Public bus services facilitate transportation, and the closest railway stations are Kalamalla and Yerraguntla Junction, situated within a 5 to 10-kilometer radius. GEOLYSIS.COM

Overall, Potladurthi exemplifies a blend of traditional occupations and modern amenities, contributing to the socio-economic development of the region.
