= Brahmamgari Matham =

Brahmamgari Matham Pothuluri Kandimallayapalle
- Nickname: B. Mattam
- Interactive map of Brahmamgari Matham
- Location in Andhra Pradesh, India
- Coordinates: 14°50′29″N 78°52′49″E
- Country: India
- State: Andhra Pradesh
- Revenue division: Badvel
- Mandal: Brahmamgarimattam

Languages
  - Official: Telugu
- Time zone: UTC+5:30 (IST)
- Postal Index Number: 516503
- Telephone code: +91–8569
- Website: http://www.kalagnani.com

Bramhamgari Matham is a village in Kadapa district of the Indian state of Andhra Pradesh. It is located in Brahmamgarimattam mandal of Badvel revenue division. It is a pilgrimage centre. The village is known as Sri Pothuluri Veera Brahmandra Swamy who entered into a samadhi alive in front of his disciples. He is considered to be the author of the Kālagnānaṁ, a book of predictions. His prophetic texts are also known as the Govinda Vakyas.

== Geography ==
Bramham gari mattam (Kandimallayapalle) is located 70 km away from Kadapa. It is well connected with roads. The preferable route from Kadapa to Kandimallayapalle is via Mydukuru. From Mydukur, the distance is 25 km. The nearest railway station to Bramhamgari Mattam is Kadapa. The nearest airport is Kadapa airport.

== Bramhamsagar Reservoir ==
The Sri Pothuluri Veerabramhendra Swamy Reservoir was named after Pothuluru Veerabrahmendra Swamy and is part of the Telugu Ganga irrigation project. The reservoir is also known as the Sundupalli reservoir. Its foundation stone was laid by the late N. T. Rama Rao. The reservoir has a capacity of 17.73 tmcft. Along with the surrounding hills, the reservoir has become a popular tourist place where boats are available for hire. Over the time due to less demand the tourism department is not that active and boating is now shut.

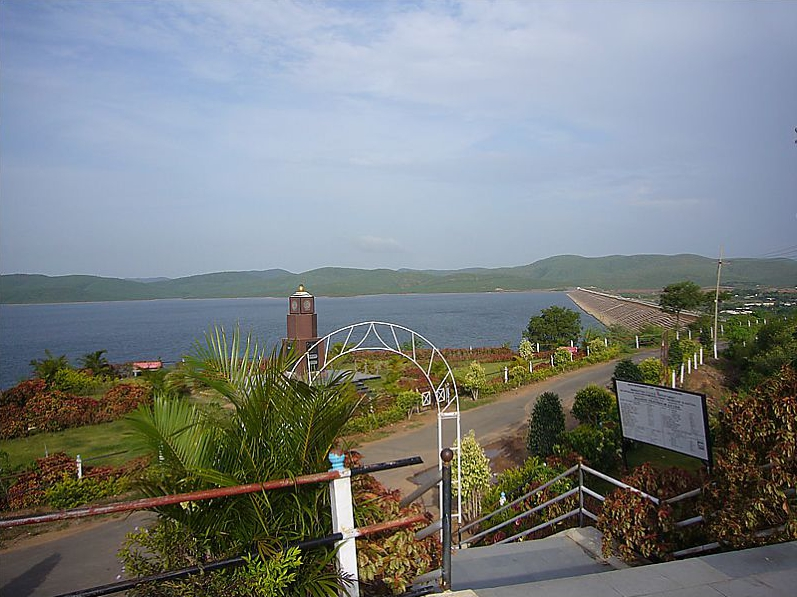
Brahmam Sagar
