= Maduru =

Coordinates: 12°29′N 75°03′E

- Village
- Interactive map of Maduru
- Country: India
- State: Andhra Pradesh
- District: Kadapa

Area
  - Total: 8 km^{2} (3.1 sq mi)

Population (2011)
  - Total: 1,349
  - Density: 170/km^{2} (440/sq mi)

Languages
  - Official: Telugu
- Time zone: UTC+5:30 (IST)
- PIN: 516484
- Area code: 08568

Maduru is a village in Thonduru Mandal, Kadapa district in the Indian state of Andhra Pradesh. As of 2011, the village has a population of 1,349.
