= Gandikovvur =

- Village
- Interactive map of Gandikovvur
- Location in Andhra Pradesh, India Gandikovvur (India)
- Coordinates: 14.275825°N 78.483719°E
- Country: India
- State: Andhra Pradesh
- District: Chittoor

Languages
  - Official: Telugu
- Time zone: UTC+5:30 (IST)

Gandikovvur is a village in Chakrayapet mandal in Cuddapah district in Andhra Pradesh. India.
