= Onipenta =

Onipenta Vanipenta, Kamsali Onipenta
- village
- Interactive map of Onipenta
- Location in Andhra Pradesh, India Onipenta (India)
- Coordinates: 14.800°N 78.783°E
- Country: India
- State: Andhra Pradesh
- District: Cuddapah
- Elevation: 138 m (453 ft)

Population (2001)
  - Total: 12,725

Languages
  - Official: Telugu language, Urdu
- Time zone: UTC+5:30 (IST)
- PIN: 516173
- Telephone code: 08564
- Vehicle registration: AP-04

Onipenta is a small village in Mydukur mandal, Kadapa District, Andhra Pradesh, India. This village is famous for brass work handicrafts; handmade brass works and domestic brass products. This village is located on National Highway N.H-16 between Tirupati and Vijayawada.
