= Sangala Palli =

Sangala Palli is a village in Veerapunayunipalle mandal, in Kadapa district in the state of Andhra Pradesh in India. It is 60 km west of the city of Kadapa. Its PIN code is 516321.

The village has an MPP government school which was established in 1953.
