= Vaparala =

- city
- Interactive map of Vaparala
- Location in Andhra Pradesh, India Vaparala (India)
- Coordinates: 14°51′31″N 78°20′53″E
- Country: India
- State: Andhra Pradesh
- District: Kadapa

Population (2001)
  - Total: 6,602

Languages
  - Official: Telugu
- Time zone: UTC+5:30 (IST)

Vaparala is a census town in Cuddapah district in the Indian state of Andhra Pradesh.

== Demographics ==
As of 2001 India census, Veparala had a population of 6,602. Males constitute 49% of the population and females 51%. Vaparala has an average literacy rate of 59%, lower than the national average of 59.5%: male literacy is 74%, and female literacy is 44%. In Vaparala, 10% of the population is under 6 years of age.
