= Bhumayapalle =

- Village
- Interactive map of Bhumayapalle
- Location in Andhra Pradesh, India
- Coordinates: 14°42′N 78°42′E
- Country: India
- State: Andhra Pradesh
- Districts: Kadapa

Population (2011)
  - Total: 5,246

Languages
  - Official: Telugu
- Time zone: UTC+5:30 (IST)
- PIN: 516203
- Telephone code: 91-8562

Bhumayapalle is a village in Khajipet mandal, located in Kadapa district of Indian state of Andhra Pradesh.
