= Prodduturu, Krishna district =

Prodduturu
- Village
- Interactive map of Prodduturu
- Location in Andhra Pradesh, India Prodduturu (India)
- Coordinates: 16°24′N 80°46′E
- Country: India
- State: Andhra Pradesh
- District: Krishna

Area
  - Total: 3.98 km^{2} (1.54 sq mi)

Population (2011)
  - Total: 2,441
  - Density: 613/km^{2} (1,590/sq mi)

Languages
  - Official: Telugu
- Time zone: UTC+5:30 (IST)
- PIN: 521151
- Vehicle registration: AP
- Lok Sabha constituency: Machilipatnam
- Vidhan Sabha constituency: Penamaluru

Prodduturu is a village in Krishna District of the Indian state of Andhra Pradesh. It is located in Kankipadu mandal of Nuzvid revenue division.
