= Korrapadu, Kadapa district =

District in India

Korrpadu is a village near Proddatur, Kadapa district in Andhra Pradesh, India.

The present sarpanch is Dhanireddy Jayalakshumma (TDP). She won 564 votes.
