= Akkayapalem =

- locality
- Interactive map of Akkayapalem
- Location in Andhra Pradesh, India Akkayapalem (India)
- Coordinates: 17°44′11″N 83°18′00″E
- Country: India
- State: Andhra Pradesh
- District: Visakhapatnam

Population (2001)
  - Total: 18,247

Languages
  - Official: Telugu
- Time zone: UTC+5:30 (IST)
- Vehicle registration: AP

Akkayapalem is a neighborhood of Visakhapatnam city in Visakhapatnam district in the state of Andhra Pradesh, India. The National Highway NH 16 runs through Akkayapalem.

Veteran comedian Kolluru Chidambara Rao who died in October 2015, was born in Akkayapalem.
