= Tekurpeta =

- Interactive map of Tekurpeta
- Location in Andhra Pradesh, India
- Coordinates: 15.001105°N 79.034786°E
- Country: India
- State: Andhra Pradesh
- District: Kadapa

Languages
  - Official: Telugu
- Time zone: UTC+5:30 (IST)
- PIN: 516505
- Telephone code: 08569
- Vehicle registration: AP 04

Tekurpeta is a small village in Kadapa district of the Indian state of Andhra Pradesh. The nationally famous turmeric variety tekurpeta is planted here . It is located in Porumamilla mandal of Rajampeta revenue division.

== Education facilities ==
There is an elementary school in Tekuru Peta. Zilla Parishad High School is a high school for studying high school

== Medical facilities ==
The village has a primary health center for healing
