= Thallamapuram =

- village
- Interactive map of Thallamapuram
- Location in Andhra Pradesh, India Thallamapuram (India)
- Coordinates: 14.42°N 78.35°E
- Country: India
- State: Andhra Pradesh
- District: Kadapa-Dt

Population (2010)
  - Total: 4,415

Languages
  - Official: Telugu
- Time zone: UTC+5:30 (IST)
- PIN: 516362
- Telephone code: 08564
- ISO 3166 code: [[ISO 3166-2:IN|]]
- Vehicle registration: AP-04
- Sex ratio: 1.008 ♂/♀

Thallamapuram is a village in Proddatur Mandal in Kadapa District in Andhra Pradesh State.
