= R. Rachapalli =

Village in the Rayalseema region of Andhra Pradesh, India

R. Rachapalli is a village in Koduru mandal, Tirupati district, Andhra Pradesh, India. I As of the 2011 Census of India, the village had a population of 250. The nearest railway station to this village in Kodur is Cuddapah which is 1.55 km away.
