= Simhadripuram =

- Village
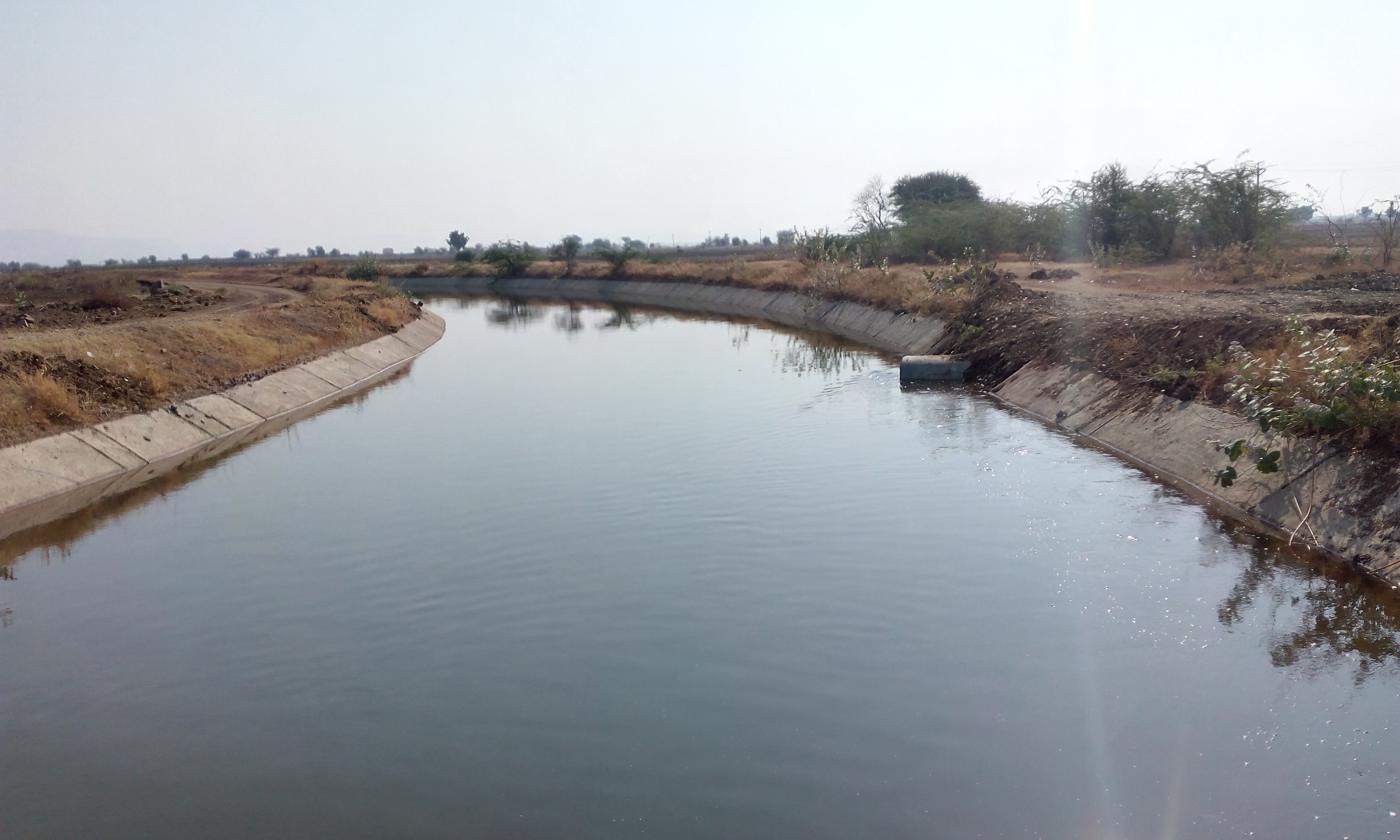
- Gandikota lift canal near Simhadripuram
- Interactive map of Simhadripuram
- Location in Andhra Pradesh, India Simhadripuram (India)
- Coordinates: 14.6333°N 78.1333°E
- Country: India
- State: Andhra Pradesh
- District: YSR Kadapa

Languages
  - Official: Telugu
- Time zone: UTC+5:30 (IST)
- Vehicle registration: AP

Simhadripuram is a village and mandal headquarters of Simhadripuram mandalin YSR Kadapa district of the Indian state of Andhra Pradesh. It is part of the Pulivendula revenue division. Simhadripuram is the birthplace of late Telugu film actor Basavaraju Venkata Padmanabha Rao.

== Geography ==
Simhadripuram is located at 14.6333°N 78.1333°E. It has an average elevation of 228 meters (751 feet). It also has Bhanu Kota under its revenue jurisdictional purview which has the great Lord Shiva temple near to Ravulakolanu village.
