= T. Chowdaravaripalli =

- village
- Interactive map of T. Chowdaravaripalli
- Location in Andhra Pradesh, India
- Coordinates: 14°49′51″N 78°57′10″E
- Country: India
- State: Andhra Pradesh
- District: Kadapa
- Elevation: 183 m (600 ft)

Population
  - Total: 1,500

Languages
  - Official: Telugu
- Time zone: UTC+5:30 (IST)
- PIN: 516503
- Telephone code: 08569
- Vehicle registration: AP

T. Chowdaravaripalli is a village in Brahmamgari Matam mandal, YSR district, Andhra Pradesh, India.
