= Chinnachowk =

- Town
- Interactive map of Chinnachowk
- Location in Andhra Pradesh, India Chinnachowk (India)
- Coordinates: 14°28′34″N 78°50′20″E
- Country: India
- State: Andhra Pradesh
- District: Cuddapah

Population (2001)
  - Total: 64,053

Languages
  - Official: Telugu
- Time zone: UTC+5:30 (IST)
- Vehicle registration: AP

Chinnachowk is a census town in Cuddapah district in the state of Andhra Pradesh, India.

== Demographics ==
As of 2001 India census, Chinnachowk had a population of 64,053. Males constitute 51% of the population and females 49%. Chinnachowk has an average literacy rate of 71%, higher than the national average of 59.5%; with male literacy of 78% and female literacy of 64%. 11% of the population is under 6 years of age.
