= Mallepalli =

- Interactive map of Mallepalli
- Location in Andhra Pradesh, India
- Coordinates: 14°21′44″N 78°06′31″E
- Country: India
- Elevation: 448 m (1,470 ft)

Population (2011)
  - Total: 4,061

Languages
  - Official: Telugu, Urdu
- Time zone: UTC+5:30 (IST)

Mallepalli is a village in Brahmamgarimattam mandal, situated in Kadapa District of Andhra Pradesh, India.

== Demographics ==
As of 2011 Census of India, the town had a population of 4,061. The total population constitutes 2,146 males, 1,915 females and 548 children, in the age group of 0–6 years. The average literacy rate stands at 57.33% with 2,014 literates, significantly higher than the national average of 73.00%.
