= Chemmumiahpet =

- town
- Interactive map of Chemmumiahpet
- Location in Andhra Pradesh, India Chemmumiahpet (India)
- Coordinates: 14°27′46″N 78°48′43″E
- Country: India
- State: Andhra Pradesh
- District: Cuddapah

Population (2001)
  - Total: 31,416

Languages
  - Official: Telugu
- Time zone: UTC+5:30 (IST)
- Vehicle registration: AP

Chemmumiahpet is a census town in Cuddapah district in the state of Andhra Pradesh, India.

== Demographics ==
As of 2001 India census, Chemmumiahpet had a population of 31,416. Males constitute 51% of the population and females 49%. Chemmumiahpet has an average literacy rate of 65%, higher than the national average of 59.5%; with male literacy of 73% and female literacy of 56%. 12% of the population is under 6 years of age.
