= Sambepalle =

- Village
- Interactive map of Sambepalle
- Location in Andhra Pradesh, India
- Coordinates: 13°57′30″N 78°45′09″E
- Country: India
- State: Andhra Pradesh
- District: Annamayya district
- Talukas: Rayachoty

Languages
  - Official: Telugu
- Time zone: UTC+5:30 (IST)
- Vehicle registration: AP

Sambepalle is a village in Annamayya district of the Indian state of Andhra Pradesh. It is located in Sambepalli mandal
