= Boggudupalli =

- village
- Interactive map of Boggudupalli
- Location in Andhra Pradesh, India Boggudupalli (India)
- Coordinates: 14°23′56″N 78°15′49″E
- Country: India
- State: Andhra Pradesh

Languages
  - Official: Telugu
- Time zone: UTC+5:30 (IST)

Boggudupalli is a small village of about seventy families in the Kadapa District of Andhra Pradesh, India. Its former name was Bokkudupalli.
