= Lakshmigari Palli =

Lakshmigari Palli is a village in Koduru mandal, Tirupati district of the state of Andhra Pradesh, India. It is surrounded by the forest of Baalapalli and it is 99.4 km (61.8 mi) away from the town of Kadapa and also just 50 km (31 mi) away from holy city of Tirupati.
