= Thondur mandal =

Thondur
- Mandal
- Interactive map of Thondur
- Location in Andhra Pradesh, India
- Country: India
- State: Andhra Pradesh
- District: YSR Kadapa
- Talukas: Thondur

Languages
  - Official: Telugu
- Time zone: UTC+5:30 (IST)
- PIN: 516401
- Telephone code: 08568
- Vehicle registration: AP

Thondur is a mandal in YSR Kadapa district of the Indian state of Andhra Pradesh. It is a part of the Pulivendula revenue division.
