= Chapadu =

Coordinates: 14°47′N 78°29′E

- Village
- Interactive map of Chapadu
- Location in Andhra Pradesh, India Chapadu (India)
- Country: India
- State: Andhra Pradesh
- District: YSR Kadapa

Languages
  - Official: Telugu
- Time zone: UTC+5:30 (IST)
- Vehicle registration: AP-04

Chapadu is a village in YSR Kadapa district of the Indian state of Andhra Pradesh. It is located in Chapadu mandal of Badvel revenue division.
