= Rajampet =

Rajampeta
- Town
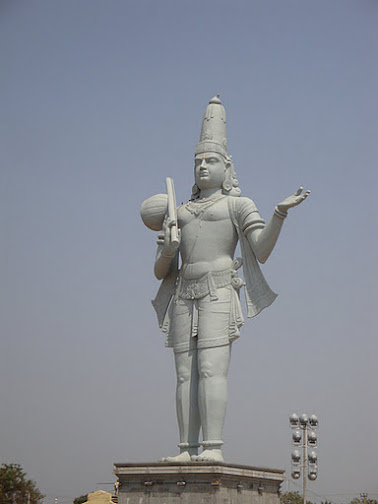
- Annamayya statue
- Motto: "Satyameva Jayathe"
- Anthem: "Maa Telugu Thalliki"
- Interactive map of Rajampeta
- Location in Andhra Pradesh, India, Asia
- Coordinates: 14.195°N 79.158°E
- Country: India
- State: Andhra Pradesh
- District: YSR Kadapa
- Mandal: Rajampet

Government
  - Body: Rajampet Municipality
  - MLA: Akepati Amarnath Reddy
  - MP: P. V. Midhun Reddy

Area
  - Total: 302 km^{2} (117 sq mi)

Population (2011)
  - Total: 127,027
  - Density: 421/km^{2} (1,090/sq mi)

Languages
  - Official: Telugu
- Time zone: UTC+05:30 (IST)
- PIN: 516115,516126
- Telephone code: 08565
- Vehicle registration: AP-04, AP-39, AP-40
- Currency: Indian Rupee

Rajampeta is a town in Kadapa district of the Indian state of Andhra Pradesh, located in the Rayalaseema Region formed on the banks of Cheyyeru River. The town has an average elevation of 139 meters (456 ft).

Rajampet is an Assembly constituency, Lok Sabha constituency and a Forest Headquarters. It is located in Rajampet mandal of Rajampeta revenue division. It is bordered by Tirupati from south to the east, Veeraballe mandal to the west, and Nandalur mandal to the north.

== Governance ==
=== Civil administration ===
Rajampet is a municipality of area 35.87 square kilometres (13.85 sq mi) in Kadapa District. Rajampet was a gram panchayat before 2005 and upgraded to Nagar Panchayat on 2 April 2005 up to an area of 20.60 km^{2} (7.95 sq mi) and in 2017 upgraded as municipality. It consists of 29 election wards. In 2019 this town was upgraded into a Grade II Municipality which is headed by a Municipal Chairman and governed by a Municipal Commissioner.

=== Politics ===
Rajampet is a Lok sabha constituency since 1957 and it is a Lok Sabha constituency of the twenty-five lok sabha constituencies from Andhra Pradesh in India and only one Parliamentary Constituency in the district.

Currently P.V Midhun Reddy Member of Parliament (India) of YSR Congress Party won from Rajampet (Lok Sabha constituency) from General elections held on 2024.

Akepati Amarnath Reddy is the present Member of Legislative Assembly (MLA) of the Rajampet Assembly constituency for the YSR Congress Party.

== Transportation ==
Razampeta railway station is the nearest railway connection of the town located on the Guntakal–Renigunta railway line operated by the South Coast Railway zone under Guntakal railway division.

== See also ==
- List of municipalities in Andhra Pradesh
- Kadapa district
