= Vemula mandal =

- Mandal
- Interactive map of Vemula mandal
- Coordinates: 14°22′29″N 78°18′47″E
- Country: India
- State: Andhra Pradesh
- District: YSR Kadapa
- Talukas: Vemula

Languages
  - Official: Telugu
- Time zone: UTC+5:30 (IST)
- Vehicle registration: AP

Vemula mandal is in YSR Kadapa district of the Indian state of Andhra Pradesh. It is part of the Pulivendula Revenue Division.
