= Vallur =

- Village
- Interactive map of Vallur
- Location in Andhra Pradesh, India
- Coordinates: 15°25′19″N 80°2′30″E
- Country: India
- State: Andhra Pradesh
- District: Prakasam
- Talukas: Tangutur

Government
  - Type: Gram Panchayat
  - Assembly constituency: Kondapi
  - Parliamentary constituency: Ongole
  - MLA: Dola Bala Veeranjaneya Swami, TDP
  - MP: Magunta Sreenivasulu Reddy, YSRCP

Area
  - Total: 24.14 km^{2} (9.32 sq mi)
- Elevation: 10 m (33 ft)

Population (2011)
  - Total: 3,476
  - Density: 144.0/km^{2} (372.9/sq mi)

Languages
  - Official: Telugu
- Time zone: UTC+5:30 (IST)
- PIN: 523272
- Telephone code: 08592
- Vehicle registration: AP

Vallur is a village in Prakasam district of Andhra Pradesh, India. It is located in Tanguturu Mandal. It is 11 km (6.8 mi) to the south of district headquarters Ongole.

There is a famous Valluramma temple that lies on the bank of the lake. It is near to Bay of Bengal.

In November 2020, a new oil terminal worth Rs.900 was proposed at Vallur.

In February 2015, NTPC's 500 MW Vallur Thermal Power Project started commercial operations. By 2024, there were three units of 500 MW each. The NTECL Vallur Thermal Power Station is a joint venture between NTPCL and Tangedco with a capacity of 1,500 MW.
