= Lingala, Kadapa district =

Lingala
- village
- Interactive map of Lingala
- Location in Andhra Pradesh, India Lingala (India)
- Coordinates: 14.0822°N 78.4243°E
- Country: India
- State: Andhra Pradesh
- District: Kadapa
- Talukas: Pulivendula
- Elevation: 292 m (958 ft)

Population (2010)
  - Total: 400

Languages
  - Official: Telugu
- Time zone: UTC+5:30 (IST)
- PIN: 516396
- Telephone code: 0091 8567

Lingala is a village and capital of Lingala mandal in Kadapa district in the state of Andhra Pradesh in India.

== Geography ==
Guravaiahgari Palli is located at 14.0822°N 78.4243°E. It has an average elevation of 292 meters (961 feet).
