= Kamalapuram, Kadapa district =

Kamalapuram
- Town
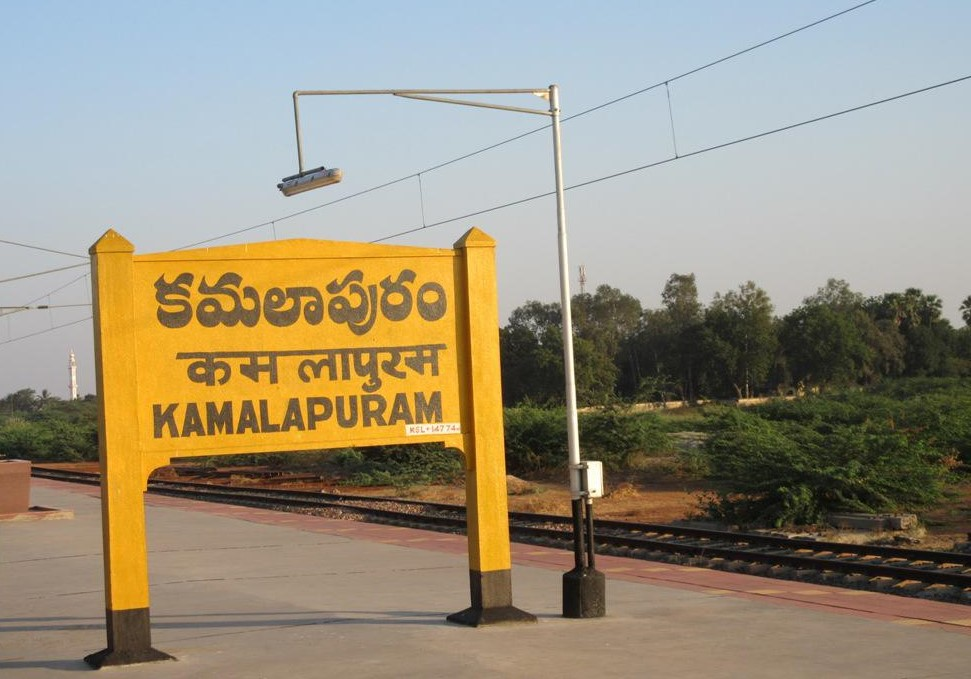
- Kamalapuram Station
- Interactive map of Kamalapuram
- Location in Andhra Pradesh, India
- Coordinates: 14.5833°N 78.6500°E
- Country: India
- State: Andhra Pradesh
- District: YSR Kadapa
- Talukas: Kamalapuram

Government
  - Type: Nagar Panchayat

Area
  - Total: 3.68 km^{2} (1.42 sq mi)
- Elevation: 134 m (440 ft)

Population (2011)
  - Total: 20,623
  - Density: 5,600/km^{2} (14,500/sq mi)

Languages
  - Official: Telugu
- Time zone: UTC+5:30 (IST)
- PIN: 516289

Kamalapuram is a Town in YSR Kadapa district of the Indian state of Andhra Pradesh. It is located in Kamalapuram mandal of Kadapa revenue division and is the Thaluka headquarter of Kamalapuram assembly constituency.

== Demography ==
According to Census 2011 information the location code or village code of Kamalapuram village is 593294. It is situated 26 km away from district headquarters. As per 2009 stats, Kamalapuram village is also a gram panchayat and is upgraded as Nagar Panchayat in 2019 merging nearby villages. The total geographical area of the village is 1778 hectares. Kamalapuram has a total population of 20,623 people. There are about 4,687 houses in Kamalapuram village. Kadapa is the nearest town to Kamalapuram, which is approximately 26 km away. Kamalapuram town is surrounded by the Papagni river on east, Kunderu river joins the Penna river on the north, and in few kilometers away papagni joins Penna river thus forming tri- river junction. Kamalapuram town is surrounded by the rich fertile agriculture land.

== Transportation ==
Kamalapuram town is located on Tirupathi- Gunthakal highway. The nearest railway connectio Kamalapuram railway station is located on Guntakal–Renigunta railway line. Kadapa airport is 23 km away from the town.

== Geography ==
Kamalapuram is located at 14.5833°N 78.6500°E. It has an average elevation of 134 meters (442 feet).

== Demographics ==
Kamalapuram has a population of 20,623 as of 2011 census. Of which males constitute 10018, and females 10605 with sex ratio of 1059 females per 1000 males. Literacy rate stands at 70.52%. Child age(0-6) constitute 11.27 with 2324 members with child sex ratio 946.

== See also ==
- Darga e gaffaria
