= Mylavaram, Kadapa =

Mylavaram
- village
- Interactive map of Mylavaram
- Location in Andhra Pradesh, India
- Coordinates: 14°51′18″N 78°19′59″E
- Country: India
- State: Andhra Pradesh
- District: Kadapa
- Talukas: Mylavaram, Kadapa district

Languages
  - Official: Telugu
- Time zone: UTC+5:30 (IST)
- Vehicle registration: AP

Mylavaram is a village and a mandal in Kadapa district in the state of Andhra Pradesh in India.
