= Pedduru, Tirupati district =

Pedduru
- Village
- Interactive map of Pedduru
- Location in Andhra Pradesh, India
- Coordinates: 14.1667°N 79.3333°E
- Country: India
- State: Andhra Pradesh
- District: Tirupati
- Mandal: Chitvel

Languages
  - Official: Telugu
- Time zone: UTC+5:30 (IST)

Pedduru is a village in Tirupati district of the Indian state of Andhra Pradesh. It is located in Chitvel mandal.
