= Pulivendula revenue division =

- revenue division in YSR district
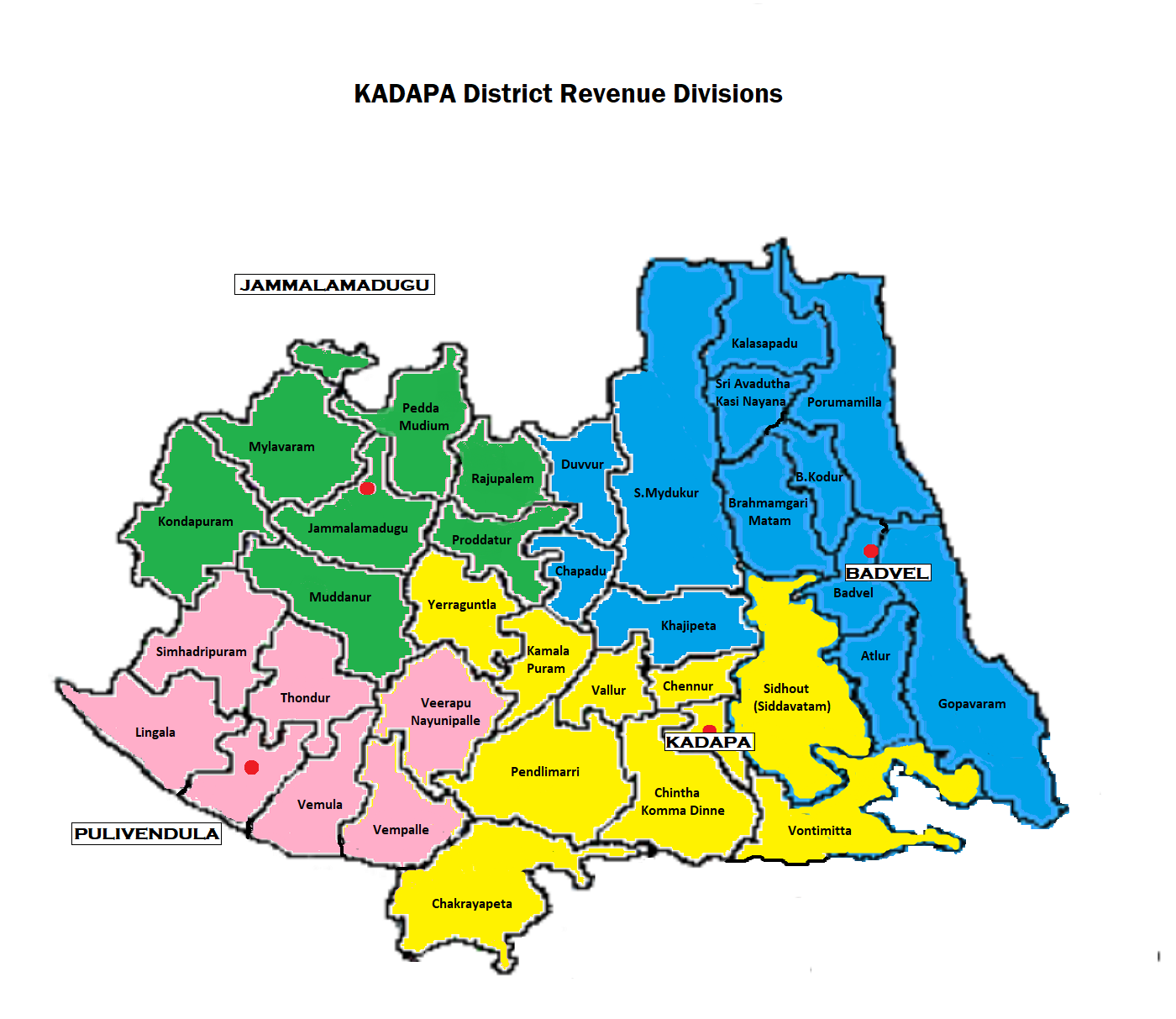
- Pulivendula revenue division in YSR district
- Country: India
- State: Andhra Pradesh
- District: Kadapa
- Headquarters: Pulivendula

Pulivendula revenue division (or Pulivendula division) is an administrative division in the Kadapa district of the Indian state of Andhra Pradesh. It is one of the 5 revenue divisions in the district and consists of seven mandals under its administration. Pulivendula is the administrative headquarters of the division.

== Administration ==
The eight mandals in this division are:

Mandals	Chakrayapet, Pulivendula, Lingala, Simhadripuram, Thondur, Vempalli, Veerapunayunipalle, Vemula

== History ==
Pulivendula revenue division was created in June 2022. Seven mandals from Jammalamadugu and Kadapa divisions were reorganized into the newly created division.

== See also ==
- List of revenue divisions in Andhra Pradesh
