= Atlur mandal =

Atlur
- Mandal
- Location in Andhra Pradesh, India Atlur (India)
- Coordinates: 14°33′30″N 79°3′17″E
- Country: India
- State: Andhra Pradesh
- District: YSR Kadapa

Area
  - Total: 112 km^{2} (43 sq mi)

Population (2011)
  - Total: 24,339
  - Density: 112/km^{2} (290/sq mi)

Languages
  - Official: Telugu
- Time zone: UTC+5:30 (IST)
- PIN: 516501
- Vehicle registration: AP

Atlur is a mandal in Kadapa district of the Indian state of Andhra Pradesh. It is located in the Badvel revenue division. It consists of 23 revenue villages and 12 gram panchayats.

== Demographics ==
As per the 2011 census, Atlur mandal has a population of 24,339 with a sex ratio of 979.females per 1,000 males. It has a literacy rate of 56.89%, with male literacy at 69.45% and female literacy at 44.20%.
