= Simhadripuram mandal =

Mandal in Kadapa district

- Mandal
- Interactive map of Simhadripuram mandal
- Location in Andhra Pradesh, India
- Coordinates: 14.6333°N 78.1333°E
- Country: India
- State: Andhra Pradesh
- District: YSR Kadapa

Languages
  - Official: Telugu
- Time zone: UTC+5:30 (IST)
- Vehicle registration: AP-03

Simhadripuram mandal is in Kadapa district. It is part of Pulivendula revenue division.

== Demographics ==
As per 2011 census, the population was 32,819.
