= Ramnagar, Uttara Kannada =

Ramnagar
- village
- Location in Karnataka, India
- Coordinates: 15.42216583293887°N 74.49137655052472°E
- Country: India
- State: Karnataka
- District: Uttara Kannada
- Taluks: Supa (Joida)

Government
  - Body: Village Panchayat

Population (2011)
  - Total: 8,055

Languages
  - Official: Kannada
- Time zone: UTC+5:30 (IST)
- Nearest city: Belagavi
- Civic agency: Village Panchayat

Ramnagar is a village in the southern state of Karnataka, India. It is situated in Joida Taluk of Uttara Kannada district. Ramnagar is the junction where roads coming from Dharwad, Belagavi and Anmod (Goa) meet. Ramnagar is at the distance of four Kilometre from Londa. Ramnagar is basically rehabilitation area for the people displaced by Hydro electric projects (Dams) built across river Kali in the state of Karnataka.Few shops and road side eateries are there in Ramnagar. It has a Post office, branch of nationalised bank, Police station and Industrial training institute(I.T.I). There is also NWKRTC bus stand at Ramnagar. Most of the NWKRTC, KSRTC, KKRTC(formerly NEKRTC) buses coming from different places of Karnataka state going towards Goa state have a stop here.

== Demographics ==
=== 2011 ===
2011 Census data
Population	Persons	Males	Females
Total	8,055	4,043	4,012
In the age group 0–6 years	1,182	599	583
Scheduled Castes (SC)	862	434	428
Scheduled Tribes (ST)	101	51	50
Literates	5,393	2,966	2,427
Illiterate	2,662	1,077	1,585
Total Worker	2,613	2,191	422
Main Worker	2,420	2,048	372
Main Worker - Cultivator	285	252	33
Main Worker - Agricultural Labourers	416	331	85
Main Worker - Household Industries	35	30	5
Main Worker - Other	1,684	1,435	249
Marginal Worker	193	143	50
Marginal Worker - Cultivator	4	4	0
Marginal Worker - Agriculture Labourers	18	7	11
Marginal Worker - Household Industries	11	7	4
Marginal Workers - Other	160	125	35
Marginal Worker (3-6 Months)	128	93	35
Marginal Worker - Cultivator (3-6 Months)	4	4	0
Marginal Worker - Agriculture Labourers (3-6 Months)	14	6	8
Marginal Worker - Household Industries (3-6 Months)	10	7	3
Marginal Worker - Other (3-6 Months)	100	76	24
Marginal Worker (0-3 Months)	65	50	15
Marginal Worker - Cultivator (0-3 Months)	0	0	0
Marginal Worker - Agriculture Labourers (0-3 Months)	4	1	3
Marginal Worker - Household Industries (0-3 Months)	1	0	1
Marginal Worker - Other Workers (0-3 Months)	60	49	11
Non Worker	5,442	1,852	3,590
