= Kalasapadu =

- Village
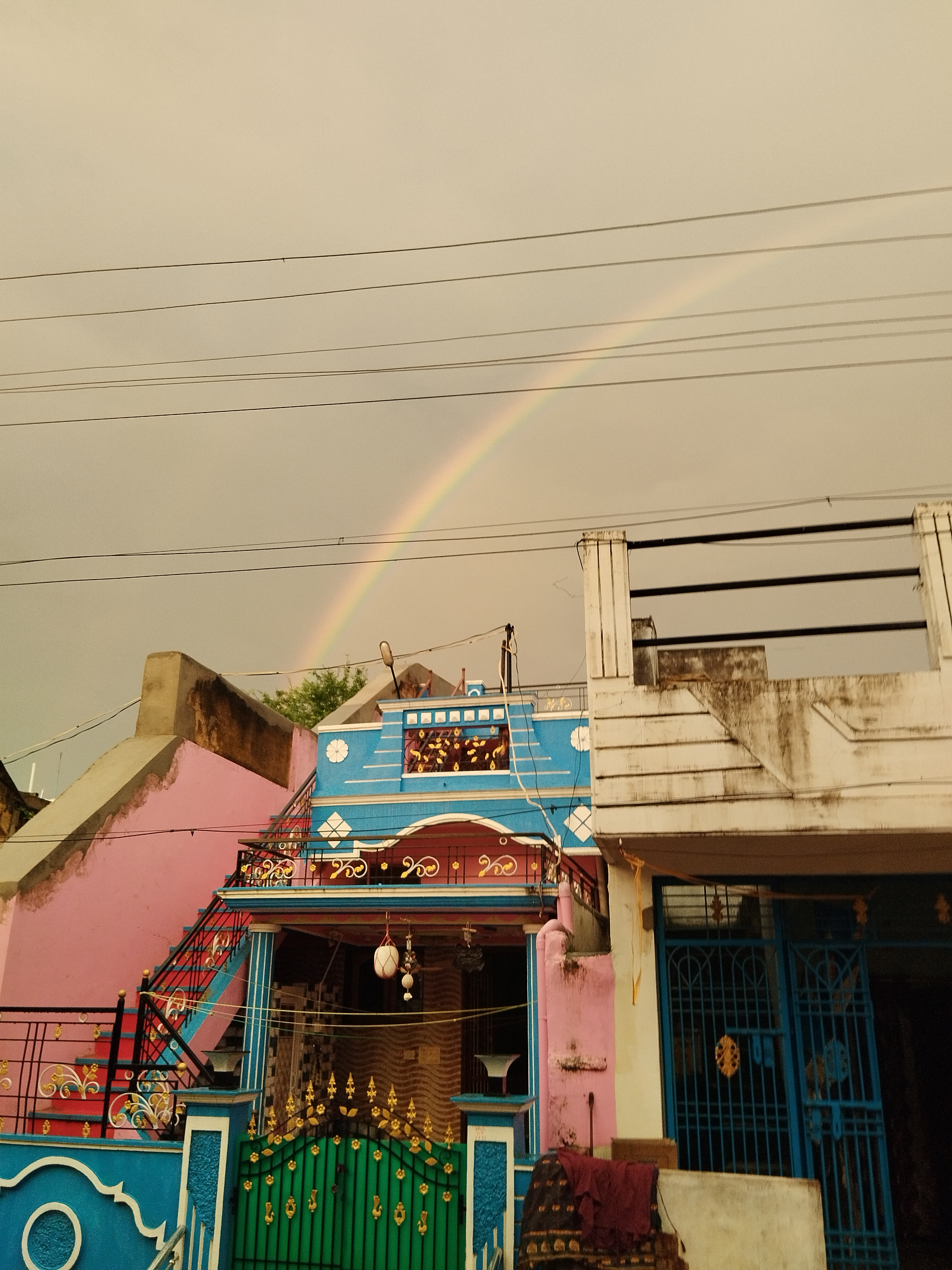
- Rainbow in Kalasapadu
- Interactive map of Kalasapadu
- Location in Andhra Pradesh, India Kalasapadu (India)
- Coordinates: 15.1167°N 78.9500°E
- Country: India
- State: Andhra Pradesh
- District: YSR Kadapa

Languages
  - Official: Telugu
- Time zone: UTC+5:30 (IST)
- PIN: 516217
- Telephone code: 085692
- Vehicle registration: AP–04

Kalasapadu is a village in YSR Kadapa district of the Indian state of Andhra Pradesh. It is located in Kalasapadu mandal of Badvel revenue division.

== Educational Facilities ==
There is one private kindergarten in the village. There are seven government primary schools, five government upper primary schools, three government secondary schools, and one private secondary school.There is a government junior college. The nearest government arts/science degree college is in Porumamilla and the nearest engineering college is in Giddalur.There is a management college, polytechnic, the nearest vocational training school, and a non-formal education center in Badvel, and a special school for the disabled, and the nearest medical college, in Kadapa.

== Geography ==
Kalasapad is located at 15.1167°N 78.9500°E. It has an average elevation of 191 meters (629 feet).
