= Pullampeta =

- Village
- Interactive map of Pullampeta
- Location in Andhra Pradesh, India
- Coordinates: 14.1167°N 79.2167°E
- Country: India
- State: Andhra Pradesh
- District: Tirupati
- Talukas: Pullampeta mandal

Languages
  - Official: Telugu
- Time zone: UTC+5:30 (IST)
- PIN: 516107
- Vehicle registration: AP

Pullampeta is a village in Tirupati district of the Indian state of Andhra Pradesh. It is located in Pullampeta mandal .

== Geography ==
Pullampet is located at 14.1167°N 79.2167°E. It has an average elevation of 161 meters (531 feet).

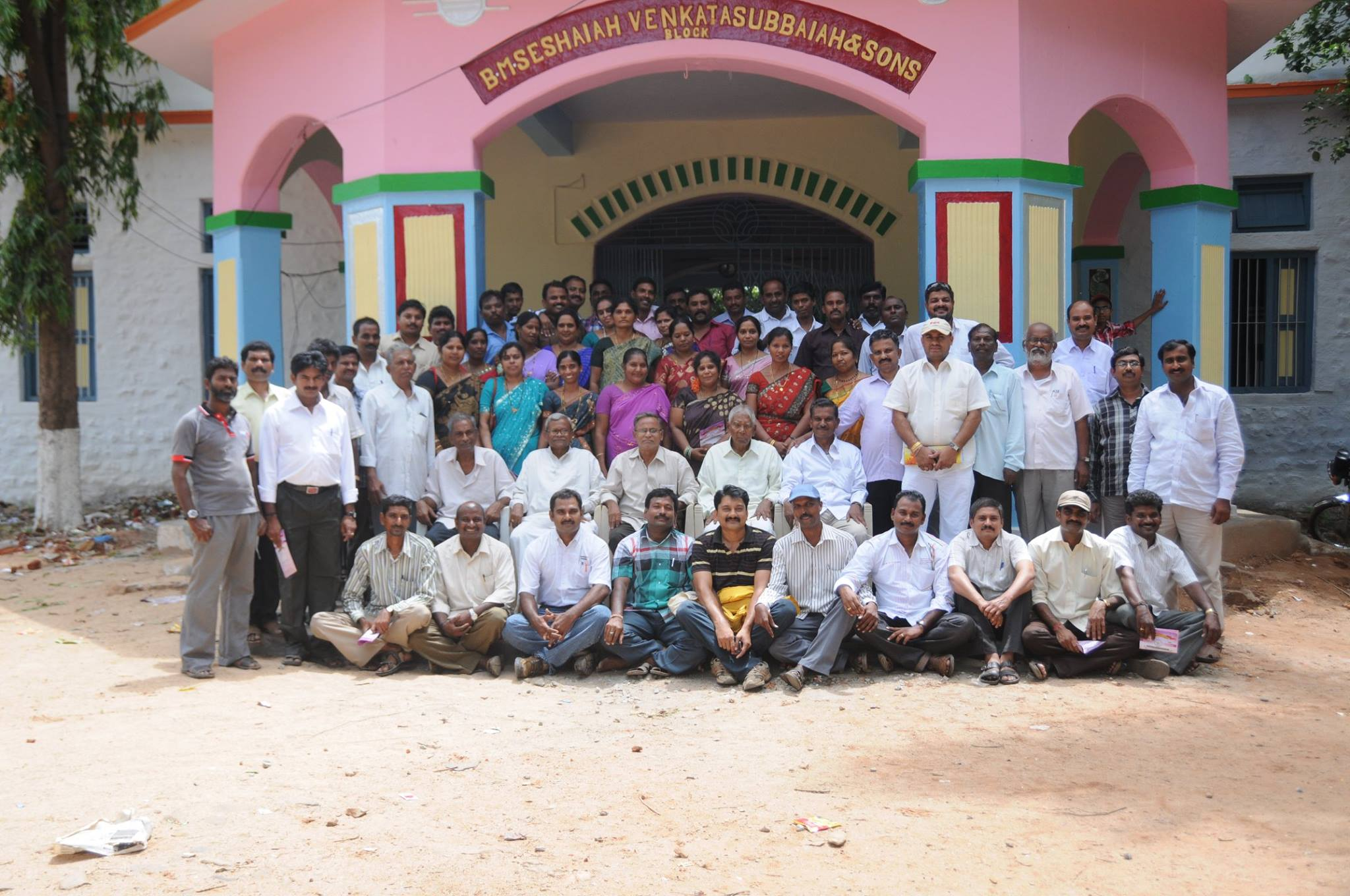
SBVDSHSchool
