= Sri Avadhutha Kasinayana mandal =

Sri Avadhutha Kasinayana
- Mandal
- Interactive Map Outlining mandal
- Country: India
- State: Andhra Pradesh
- District: Kadapa

Languages
  - Official: Telugu
- Time zone: UTC+5:30 (IST)
- Vehicle registration: AP-04

Sri Avadhutha Kasinayana mandal is a mandal in Kadapa district of the Indian state of Andhra Pradesh.
