= Peddamudium =

- Village
- Interactive map of Peddamudium
- Location in Andhra Pradesh, India
- Country: India
- State: Andhra Pradesh
- District: Kadapa

Population
  - Total: About 2,000

Languages
  - Official: Telugu
- Time zone: UTC+5:30 (IST)
- PIN: 516434
- Vehicle registration: AP

Peddamudium is a village in Kadapa district of the Indian state of Andhra Pradesh. It is located in Peddamudium mandal of Jammalamadugu revenue division. It is Kadapa's regional capital of Chola Kingdom with the name Mudivemu. The history of Peddamudium dates back to 100 AD. The Chalukya family according to a tradition recorded in the 11th century was founded by Vijayaditya, an adventurer from Ayodhya who lost his life in a fight with Trilochana Pallava (100 AD). Vijayaditya's queen who was pregnant at that time took shelter in a village Mudivemu with the caretaker a Brahmana named Vishnubhatta Somayaji and gave birth to a son named Vishnuvardhana. When he grew up Vishnuvardhana conquered Kadambas, Gangas, others and established his rule. He married a Pallava princess and was succeeded by his son Vijayaditya whose son was Pulakeshin I - the founder of the Chalukya dynasty.
