= Vempalle =

- Village
- Interactive map of Vempalle
- Location in Andhra Pradesh, India
- Coordinates: 14.3667°N 78.4667°E
- Country: India
- State: Andhra Pradesh
- District: YSR
- Elevation: 201 m (659 ft)

Population (2011)
  - Total: 36,031

Languages
  - Official: Telugu
- Time zone: UTC+5:30 (IST)
- PIN: 516329
- Vehicle registration: AP04

Vempalle is a town located in Andhra Pradesh, India. It is the headquarters of Vempalle Mandal, YSR district. It occupies an area of about 10 square kilometres along the banks of the Papagni river.

== Geography ==
Vempalle is located at 14.3667°N 78.4667°E. It has an average elevation of 201 meters (662 feet).

== Demographics ==
According to the 2011 Indian Census, Vempalle has 8,577 households and 36,031 residents. The male population is 18,060 and the female population is 17,971. The literacy rate is 54.74%, with 11,160 of the male inhabitants and 8,563 of the female inhabitants being literate. Its census location code is 593459.
