= Khajipeta Sunkesula =

Khajipeta
- Village
- Interactive map of Khajipeta
- Location in Andhra Pradesh, India
- Coordinates: 14.6333°N 78.7667°E
- Country: India
- State: Andhra Pradesh
- District: Kadapa
- Talukas: Khajipeta

Population (2011)
  - Total: 11,658

Languages
  - Official: Telugu
- Time zone: UTC+5:30 (IST)
- PIN: 516203
- Telephone code: 08562
- Vehicle registration: AP-04

Khajipeta Sunkesula is a village in YSR Kadapa district of the Indian state of Andhra Pradesh. It is located in Khajipet mandal of Badvel revenue division. Its population was 11615 as of the 2011 Census. Individuals of Scheduled Castes and Scheduled Tribes account for about 16% of the population of Khajipeta Sunkesula. Khajipet is located at 14.6333°N 78.7667°E. It has an average elevation of 123 meters (404 feet). Khajipeta is supported by the APSRTC, a bus transport company. A National Highway, NH40, passes through this mandal, but no railway.
