= Veerapunayunipalle mandal =

- Mandal
- Interactive map of Veerapunayunipalle mandal
- Country: India
- State: Andhra Pradesh
- District: YSR Kadapa

Area
  - Mandal: 294 km^{2} (114 sq mi)

Population (2011)
  - Mandal: 32,910
  - Density: 112/km^{2} (290/sq mi)
  - Urban: 0
  - Rural: 32,910

Languages
  - Official: Telugu
- Time zone: UTC+5:30 (IST)
- PIN: 516321
- Vehicle registration: AP

Veerapunayuni Palli mandal is a mandal in YSR Kadapa district of the Indian state of Andhra Pradesh. It is located in the Pulivendula revenue division. It consists of 19 revenue villages and 20 gram panchayats.

== Demographics ==
As per the 2011 census, Veerapunayunipalle mandal has a population of 32,910 with 8,479 households. The population is entirely rural. It has a literacy rate of 64.35%, with male literacy at 76.28% and female literacy at 52.52%.

Scheduled Castes (SC) make up 17.58% of the population while Scheduled Tribes (ST) are 0.7% of the population.
