= Chakarayapet =

- Village
- Interactive map of Chakarayapet
- Location in Andhra Pradesh, India Chakarayapet (India)
- Coordinates: 14.217°N 78.568°E
- Country: India
- State: Andhra Pradesh
- District: YSR Kadapa
- Talukas: Chakarayapet

Languages
  - Official: Telugu
- Time zone: UTC+5:30 (IST)
- Vehicle registration: AP

Chakarayapet is a village and capital of Chakrayapet mandal in YSR Kadapa district of the Indian state of Andhra Pradesh. It is part of the Pulivendula Revenue division.
