= B. Kodur =

B Kodur
- Village
- Interactive map of B Kodur
- Location in Andhra Pradesh, India
- Coordinates: 14.87969°N 78.97723°E
- Country: India
- State: Andhra Pradesh
- District: kadapa

Languages
  - Official: Telugu
- Time zone: UTC+5:30 (IST)
- Vehicle registration: AP

B. Kodur is a village in Kadapa district of the Indian state of Andhra Pradesh. It is located B. Kodur mandal of Badvel revenue division.
