= Porumamilla =

Porumamilla Porumamilla
- Town
- Interactive map of Porumamilla
- Location in Andhra Pradesh, India Porumamilla (India)
- Coordinates: 15.0167°N 78.9833°E
- Country: India
- State: Andhra Pradesh
- District: Kadapa

Languages
  - Official: Telugu; Urdu
- Time zone: UTC+5:30 (IST)
- PIN: 516193
- Telephone code: 08569
- Vehicle registration: AP 04

Porumamilla is a village in YSR district of the Indian state of Andhra Pradesh. It is famous for sound quality of burnt clay bricks near around here. It is located in Porumamilla mandal of Badvel revenue division.

== Geography ==
Porumamilla is located at 15.0167°N 78.9833°E near Badvel. It has an average elevation of 176 meters (580 feet).

== History ==
According to the Mahābhārata, Porumamilla got its name from a battle that took place here between Bhima and Bakasura So Poru means Battle Milla means take place so it named like that .
