= Chinthakommadinne =

Chinthakommadinne (C.K. Dinne)
- Mandal
- Interactive map of Chinthakommadinne (C.K. Dinne)
- Location in Andhra Pradesh, India Chinthakommadinne (C.K. Dinne) (India)
- Coordinates: 14.4267483°N 78.7617893°E
- Country: India
- State: Andhra Pradesh
- District: Kadapa
- Mandals: Chinthakommadinne

Languages
  - Official: Telugu
- Time zone: UTC+5:30 (IST)
- Vehicle registration: AP

Chinthakommadinne (also called C.K. Dinne) is a mandal in Kadapa district of the Indian state of Andhra Pradesh. It covers 24 villages. Postal Pin code is 516003.

== History ==
Since 2015 the C.K. Dinne area has been affected by a large number of sinkholes. In 2017 sinkholes were reported in Buggalapalle and a mangrove in Gudavandlapalle. Anand Pandey of the National Geophysical Research Institute explained that the sinkholes were related to the erosion of underground minerals as a result of the Buggavagu irrigation project.
