= Rajupalem, Kadapa district =

Rajupalem
- Village
- Interactive map of Rajupalem
- Location in Andhra Pradesh, India
- Coordinates: 14.875607°N 78.578845°E
- Country: India
- State: Andhra Pradesh
- District: YSR Kadapa
- Talukas: Rajupalem, Kadapa district

Languages
  - Official: Telugu
- Time zone: UTC+5:30 (IST)
- PIN: 516359
- Telephone code: 08564
- Vehicle registration: AP

Rajupalem is a village in YSR Kadapa district of the Indian state of Andhra Pradesh. It is located in Rajupalem mandal of Jammalamadugu revenue division.

== Demographics ==
As of 2011 census, Rajupalem village has a population of 2465, of which 1218 are males while 1247 are females. The average sex ratio of the village is 1024, which is higher than Andhra Pradesh's state average of 993. The population of children with age 0-6 is 234, which makes up 9.49% of the total population of the village, with sex ratio of 1035. The literacy rate of Rajupalem village was 64.10% compared to 67.02% in Andhra Pradesh.
