= Pendlimarri =

- Mandal
- Interactive map of Pendlimarri
- Location in Andhra Pradesh, India
- Country: India
- State: Andhra Pradesh
- District: Kadapa
- Talukas: Pendlimarri

Population
  - Total: 15,000

Languages
  - Official: Telugu
- Time zone: UTC+5:30 (IST)
- PIN: 516216
- Telephone code: 0856
- Vehicle registration: AP

Pendlimarri is a village in Kadapa district of the Indian state of Andhra Pradesh. It is located in Pendlimarri mandal of Kadapa revenue division. The former sarpanch of Pendlimarri is Maddali siva reddy. The MPTC of Pendlimarri Ms. Yarasu Nagamma w/o Yarasu Nagamalla Reddy.
