= Chennur, Kadapa district =

Chennur
- Village
- Interactive map of Chennur
- Location in Andhra Pradesh, India Chennur (India)
- Coordinates: 14.5667°N 78.8000°E
- Country: India
- State: Andhra Pradesh
- District: YSR Kadapa
- Talukas: Chennur

Population
  - Total: 58,000

Languages
  - Official: Telugu
- Time zone: UTC+5:30 (IST)
- Vehicle registration: AP

Chennur is a village in YSR Kadapa district of the Indian state of Andhra Pradesh. It is located in Chennur mandal of Kadapa revenue divisions.

== Geography ==
Chennur is located at 14.5667°N 78.8000°E. It has an average elevation of 115 meters (380 feet).

== Demographics ==
As of 2011 census, Chennur had a population of 16,126. The total population constitute, 8,051 males and 8,075 females with sex ratio of 1019 females per 1000 males. 1,880 children are in the age group of 0–6 years. The average literacy rate stands at 68.99% with 9,828 literates, higher than the district average of 67.88%.
