= Badvel =

- Town
- Location in Andhra Pradesh, India
- Coordinates: 14.75°N 79.05°E
- Country: India
- State: Andhra Pradesh
- District: YSR Kadapa

Area
  - Total: 60.93 km^{2} (23.53 sq mi)
- Elevation: 126 m (413 ft)

Population (2020)
  - Total: 70,626
  - Density: 1,159/km^{2} (3,002/sq mi)

Languages
  - Official: Telugu
- Time zone: UTC+5:30 (IST)
- PIN: 516227
- Vehicle registration: AP-04

Badvel is a municipality in Kadapa district of the Indian state of Andhra Pradesh. Badvel Town is located in two mandals. It is the headquarters of Badvel revenue division. A major portion of the town falls under Badvel mandal and remaining portion of the town falls under Gopavaram Mandal. It falls under Badvel revenue division.

Badvel is just 57 kilometres (35 mi) away from Proddatur and 59 kilometres (37 mi) away from Kadapa, which are major cities of Kadapa District. Badvel is the 3rd biggest town of Kadapa District followed by Kadapa and Proddutur. NH-67 passes through Badvel Town. Geographically, the town is located at the foot hills of the Eastern Ghats.

== Assembly constituency ==
Badvel is an assembly constituency in Andhra Pradesh. Currently it is reserved for SC's. Present Assembly member is Dr.Dasari Sudha.

== Education ==
The primary and secondary school education is imparted by government, aided and private schools, under the School Education Department and it has a Sbvr agricultural college of the state. The medium of instruction followed by different schools are English and Telugu.
