= Nandalur =

- Town
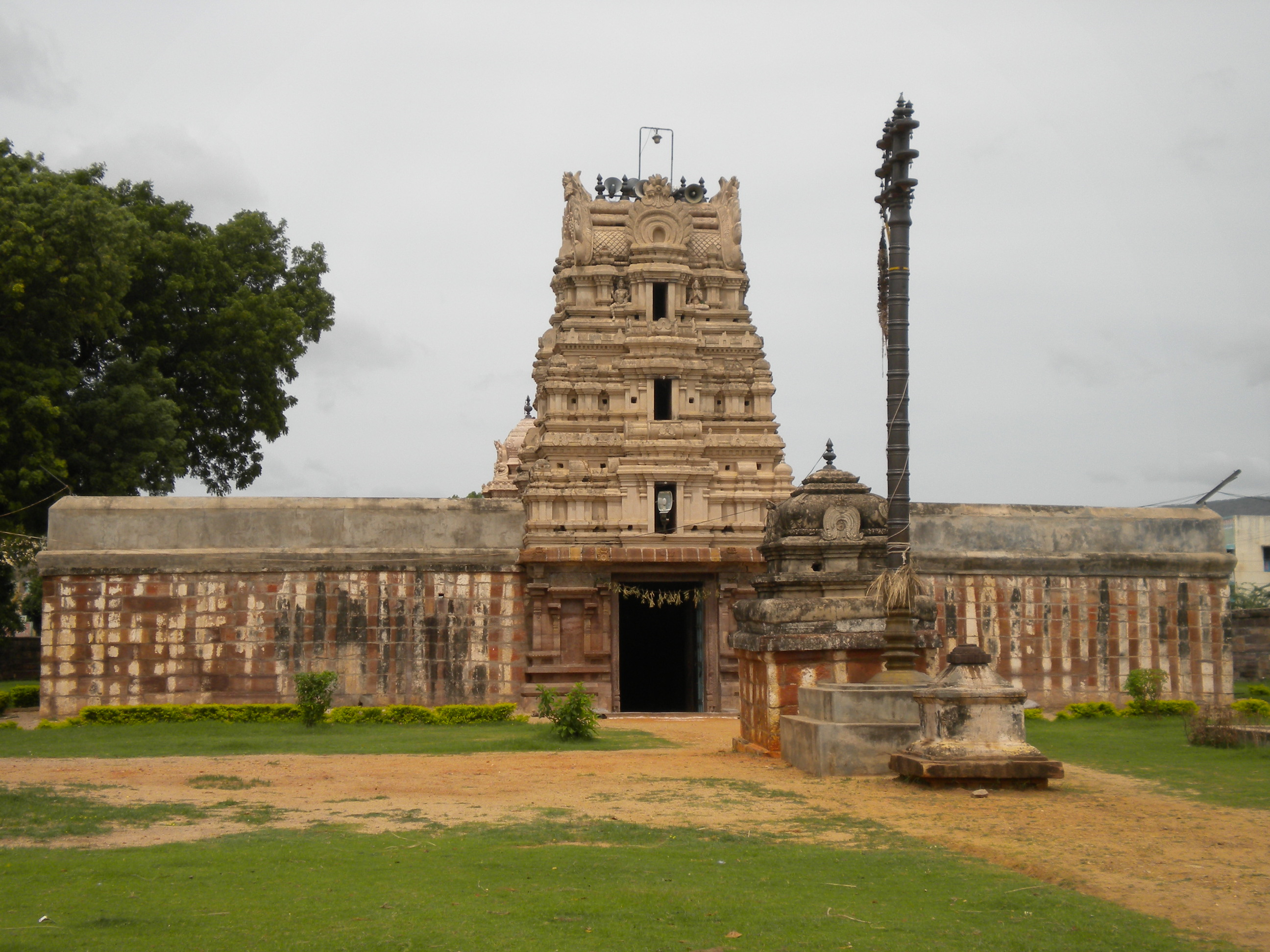
- Sri Soumyanatha Swamy Temple - Nandalur
- Interactive map of Nandalur
- Nandalur, Andhra Pradesh, India
- Coordinates: 14.2500°N 79.1167°E
- Country: India
- State: Andhra Pradesh
- District: YSR Kadapa

Government
  - Type: Gram Panchayat

Area
  - Total: 12 km^{2} (4.6 sq mi)
- Elevation: 151 m (495 ft)
- Demonym(s): Nandalurian, Nandalurollu

Languages
  - Official: Telugu
- Time zone: UTC+5:30 (IST)
- PIN: 516150
- Telephone code: 08565
- Vehicle registration: AP 39

Nandalur is a Census Town in YSR Kadapa District of the Indian state of Andhra Pradesh. It is the mandal headquarters of Nandalur mandal in Rajampeta revenue division.

Nandalur is on the west bank of river Cheyyeru. It was once a Buddhist centre in Rayalaseema. In 1913 Buddhist caves and viharas dating to the 1st century BCE were discovered.
