= Mydukur =

Mydukur Mydukuru
- Town
- Location in Andhra Pradesh, India
- Coordinates: 14.700°N 78.780°E
- Country: India
- State: Andhra Pradesh
- District: YSR Kadapa

Area
  - Total: 55.28 km^{2} (21.34 sq mi)

Languages
  - Official: Telugu
- Time zone: UTC+5:30 (IST)
- PIN: 516 172
- telephone code: +91–8564
- Vehicle registration: AP–04
- Website: Mydukur Municipality

Mydukur, natively known as Mydukuru, is a Municipality in YSR Kadapa district of the Indian state of Andhra Pradesh. It is located in Mydukur mandal of Badvel revenue division. Mydukur is located on Main Junction of NH-40 and NH-67. It is a junction point for Kurnool, Kadapa, Proddatur, Markapur, and Nellore Highways.

== Education ==
The primary and secondary school education is imparted by government, aided and private schools, under the School Education Department of the state.

== See also ==
- Mydukur (assembly constituency)
