= Proddatur =

- Town
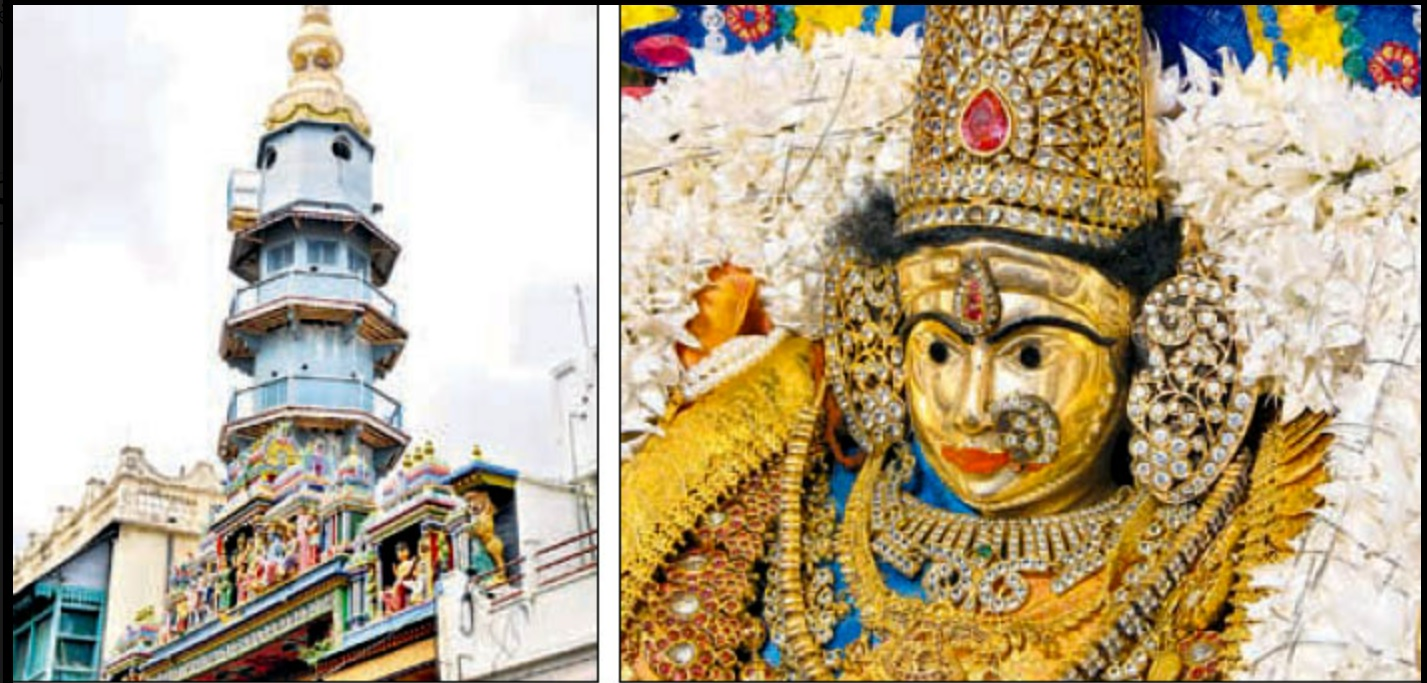
- Proddatur Ammavarishaala

- Location in Andhra Pradesh, India
- Coordinates: 14.75°N 78.55°E
- Country: India
- State: Andhra Pradesh
- Region: Rayalaseema
- District: YSR Kadapa
- Named for: Bradhanpuri

Government
  - Type: Municipal Council
  - Body: Proddatur Municipality

Area
  - Town: 21.06 km^{2} (8.13 sq mi)
  - Rank: 15th(in state)
- Elevation: 158 m (518 ft)

Population (2011)
  - Town: 217,895
  - Density: 10,350/km^{2} (26,800/sq mi)
  - Metro: 217,895

Languages
  - Official: Telugu
- Time zone: UTC+5:30 (IST)
- PIN: 516360, 516361, 516362
- Telephone code: 08564
- Vehicle registration: AP-04 and AP-24
- Literacy: 78.08%
- Website: eproddatur.com

Proddatur is a town in the YSR Kadapa District of Andhra Pradesh, located on the banks of the Penna River. The city is a municipality, and also the mandal headquarters of Proddatur mandal. It is the second-largest town in former Kadapa District. It is the oldest municipality which formed before Independence.

Proddatur got its name from the history of Ramayana, where Lord Rama resided. Many old temples are located in the city. The temple where Lord Rama resided is located on the banks of Penna River, known as Rameshwaram. It is known as Second Bombay for Gold business. Thousands of gold and clothing shops are located in Proddutur. It is also known as the Second Mysore for its grandeur in Dussehra celebrations. It is 13th largest urban agglomeration in Andhrapradesh. It became a municipality in 1915, later it was upgraded from 3rd, to 2nd, to 1st. In 1998, it became a Special Grade Municipality. Proddatur–to–Cumbum railway section was sanctioned in 2010 which is strategically important for the town. National Highway 67 passes through this town. Multiple schools, colleges and a wide range of hospitals are located here along with a 350 bed government hospital. The town is near the centre for small towns like Jammalamadugu, Mydukur, Chagalamarri, Yerraguntla and a major center nearby other small towns in the Kadapa District. A large number of people from these small towns commute to Proddatur for their livelihoods.

It also has a forest division—Proddatur Forest Division.

== Demographics ==
As of the 2011 census, Proddatur urban agglomeration has population of 217,895. The city had a population of 162,816. Proddatur is one of the most densely populated municipalities in Andhra Pradesh. There are 81,368 males and 81,448 females in the total population; a sex ratio of 1001 females per 1000 males, higher than the national average of 940 per 1000. 15,516 children are in the age group of 0–6 years, of which 7,999 are boys and 7,517 are girls; a ratio of 940 per 1000. The average literacy rate stands at 78.08% (male 86.02%; female 70.20%) with 115,011 literates, significantly higher than the national average of 73.00%.

Its urban agglomeration had a population of 217,895, of which males constitute 108,986, females represent 108,900; a sex ratio of 999 females per 1000 men; 21,616 are in the age group of 0–6 years. There are a total of 147,156 literates, with an average literacy rate of 75.97%.

== Governance ==
Kadapa and Proddatur are the only municipalities which were formed before independence in the district. The Proddatur municipality was formed in 1915. It was upgraded to a Special Grade Municipality in 1998. The jurisdiction of the municipality is spread over an area of 21.06 km^{2} (8.13 sq mi).

The city is one of the 31 cities in the state to be a part of water supply and sewerage services mission known as the Atal Mission for Rejuvenation and Urban Transformation, or AMRUT. Per the National Urban Sanitation Policy, the city was ranked 327th in the country in 2009–10, with a total of 27.450 points.

== Economy ==
Its economy is mainly driven by gold and cotton businesses, book manufacturing, and financing.

== Transport ==
- Proddatur is located on Highway 67. Daily bus services are available to Bangalore, Hyderabad, Chennai, Vijayawada; non-stop bus service is available to Kadapa and Tirupati .
- Proddatur railway station is situated on the Nandyal–Yerraguntla section. It falls under the jurisdiction of the Guntakal railway division.
- 60 km from Kadapa Airport.

== Education ==
The primary and secondary education consists of government-funded and government-aided public schools, and private schools, under the School Education Department of the state. Instruction in provided in either English or Telugu.

- Sri Ravindra High School
- Deepthi junior college
- Vaagdevi Institute of Technology and Science
- Chaitanya Bharathi Institute of Technology
- Vignana Bharathi Institute of Technology
- Gouthami Institute of Technology and Management for Women
- Lepakshi Degree College
- Sri Venkateswara Veterinary College
- Yogivemana Govt Engineering college

== Notable people ==
- Santha Kumari – South Indian drama and movie actress
- Puttaparthi Narayanacharyulu – Poet, also known as "Saraswati Putra"
- Padmanabham – Telugu comedian

== See also ==
- List of cities in Andhra Pradesh
- List of municipalities in Andhra Pradesh
