= List of revenue divisions in Andhra Pradesh =

Andhra Pradesh State Districts and Revenue Divisions

Revenue Divisions are the administrative divisions in districts of some of the Indian states. These divisions are sub-divided into mandals. The mandals are in turn divided into villages and hamlets. There are 79 revenue divisions in Andhra Pradesh. Revenue Divisional Officer (RDO) or Sub Collector is the head of the division.

== List of revenue divisions ==
The below table details the revenue divisions with respect to their districts.

No	District	No. of Divisions	Revenue Divisions	Revenue Divisions Map	Ref
01	Srikakulam	3	Srikakulam, Palasa, Tekkali		
02	Vizianagaram	3	Vizianagaram, Bobbili, Cheepurupalli		
03	Parvathipuram Manyam	2	Parvathipuram, Palakonda		
04	Alluri Sitharama Raju	1	Paderu		
05	Visakhapatnam	2	Visakhapatnam, Bheemunipatnam		
06	Anakapalli	3	Anakapalli, Adduroad Junction, Narsipatnam		
07	Kakinada	2	Kakinada, Peddapuram		
08	Konaseema	3	Amalapuram, Kothapeta, Ramachandrapuram		
09	East Godavari	2	Rajahmundry, Kovvur		
10	Polavaram	2	Rampachodavaram, Chinturu		
11	West Godavari	3	Bhimavaram, Narasapuram, Tadepalligudem		
12	Eluru	3	Eluru, Jangareddygudem, Nuzividu		
13	Krishna	3	Gudivada, Machilipatnam, Vuyyuru		
14	NTR	3	Vijayawada, Nandigama, Tiruvuru	NTR district revenue divisions	
15	Guntur	2	Guntur, Tenali		
16	Palnadu	3	Narasaraopet, Sattenapalle, Gurazala		
17	Bapatla	3	Bapatla, Chirala, Repalle		
18	Markapuram	2	Markapur, Kanigiri		
19	Prakasam	3	Ongole, Kandukur, Addanki		
20	Nellore	4	Nellore, Atmakur, Gudur, Kavali		
21	Kurnool	3	Kurnool, Adoni, Pattikonda	Kurnool District Revenue Divisions	
22	Nandyala	4	Nandyala, Atmakur, Banaganapalle, Dhone	Nandyala district revenue divisions	
23	Anantapur	3	Ananthapuramu, Guntakal, Kalyandurg	Anantapuram Districts Revenue Divisions	
24	Sri Sathya Sai	5	Puttaparthi, Madakasira, Penukonda, Dharmavaram, Kadiri	Sri Sathya Sai District Revenue Divisions	
25	Kadapa	5	Kadapa, Jammalamadugu, Badvel, Pulivendula, Rajampeta	Kadapa District Revenue Divisions	
26	Annamayya	3	Madanapalle, Pileru, Rayachoti	Annamayya District Revenue Divisions	
27	Tirupati	3	Tirupati, Srikalahasti, Sulurupeta	Tirupati District Revenue Divisions	
28	Chittoor	4	Chittoor, Palamaner, Nagari, Kuppam	Chittoor District Revenue Divisions	
	Total Revenue Divisions	79			

== See also ==
- List of mandals in Andhra Pradesh
