= Kadapa district =

District of Andhra Pradesh, India

Kadapa District
- District of Andhra Pradesh
- YSR Kadapa District
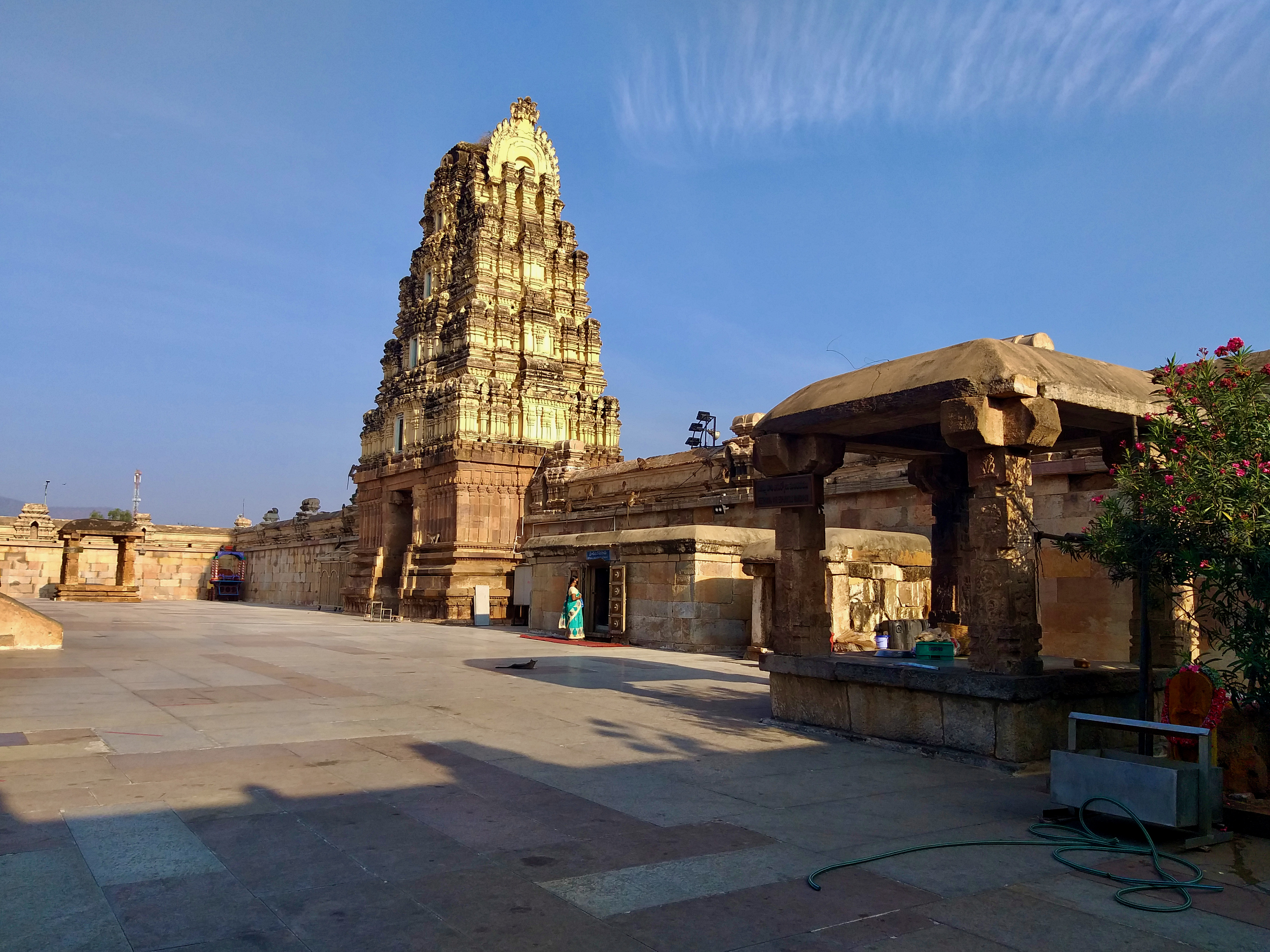
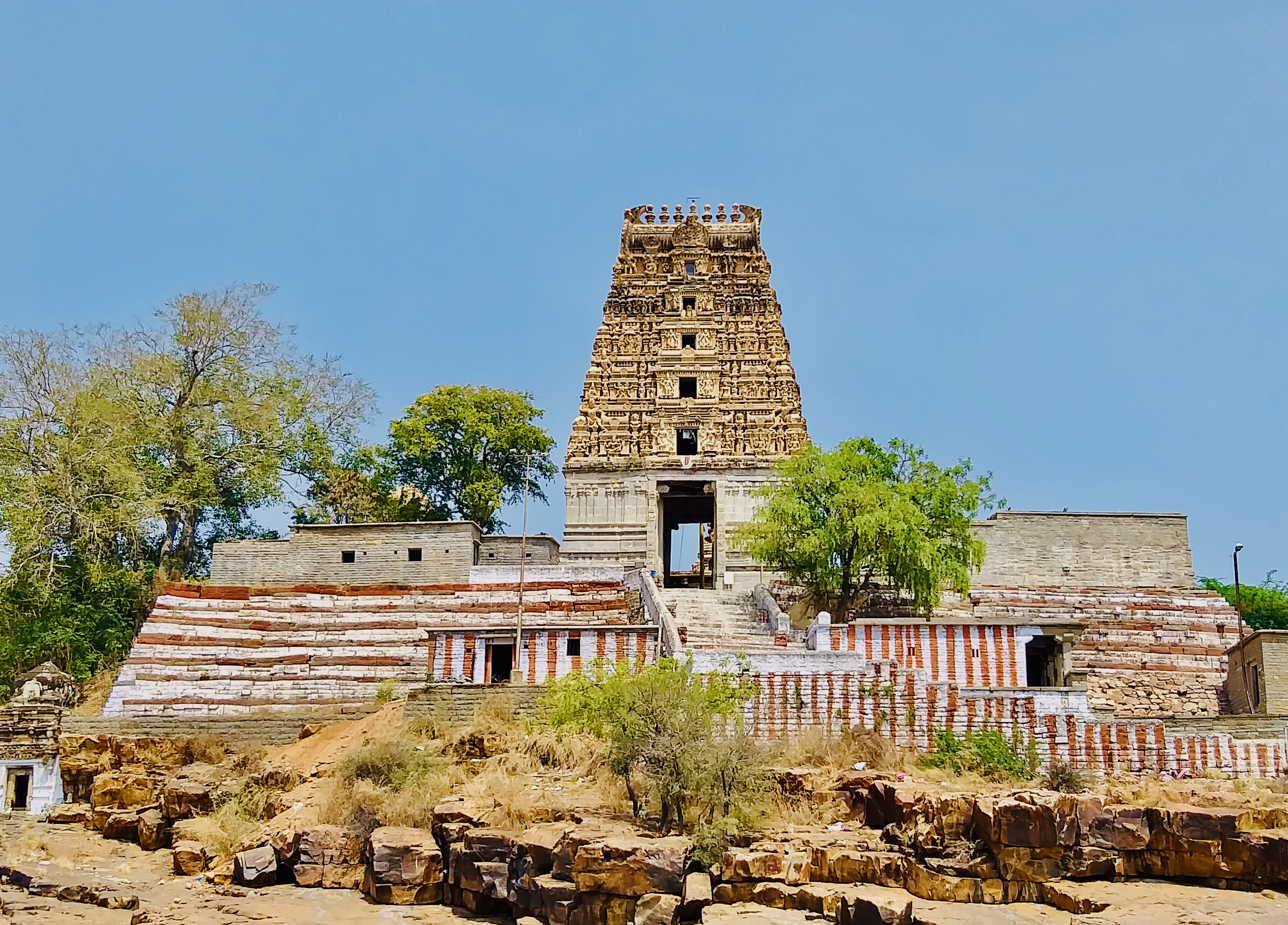
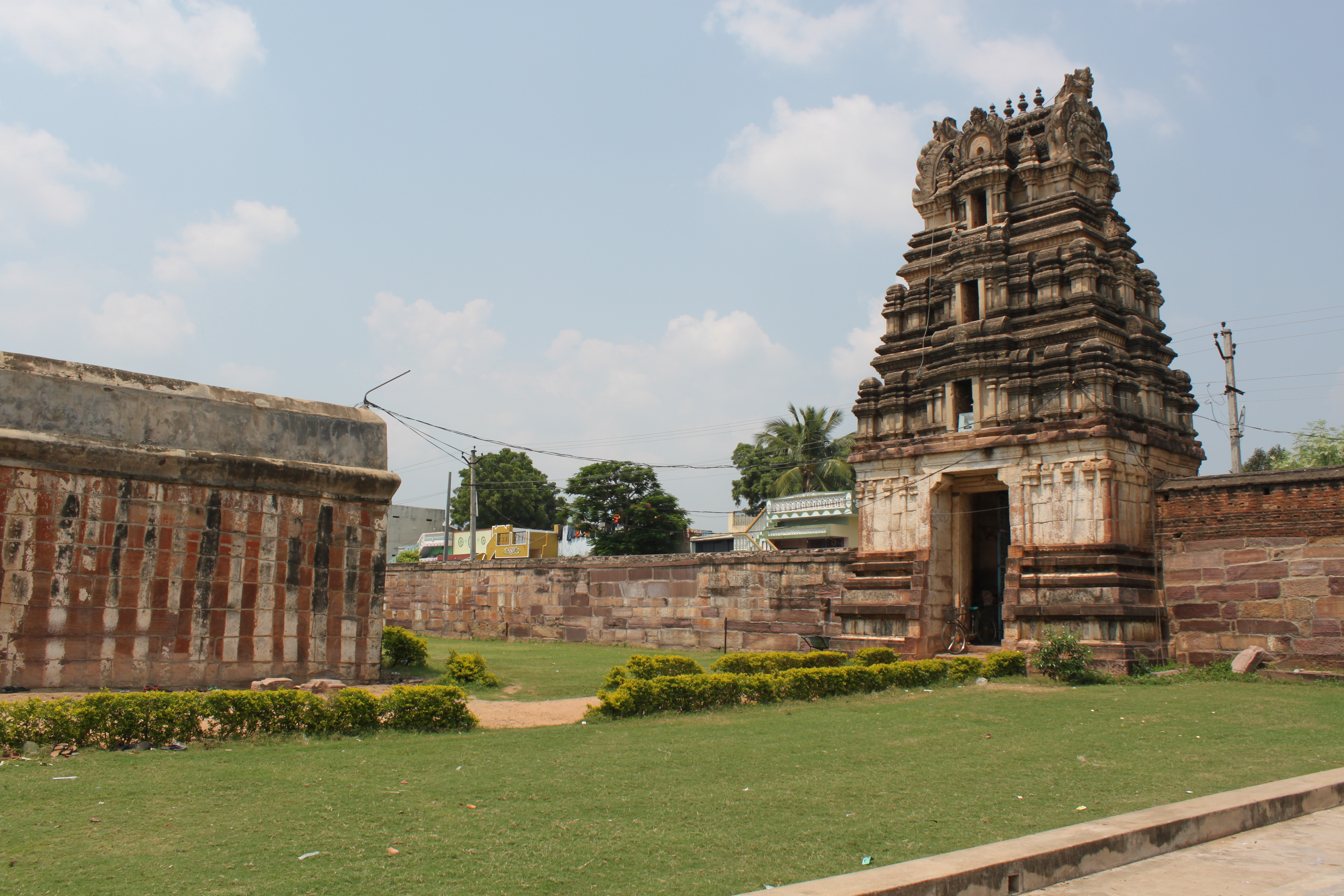
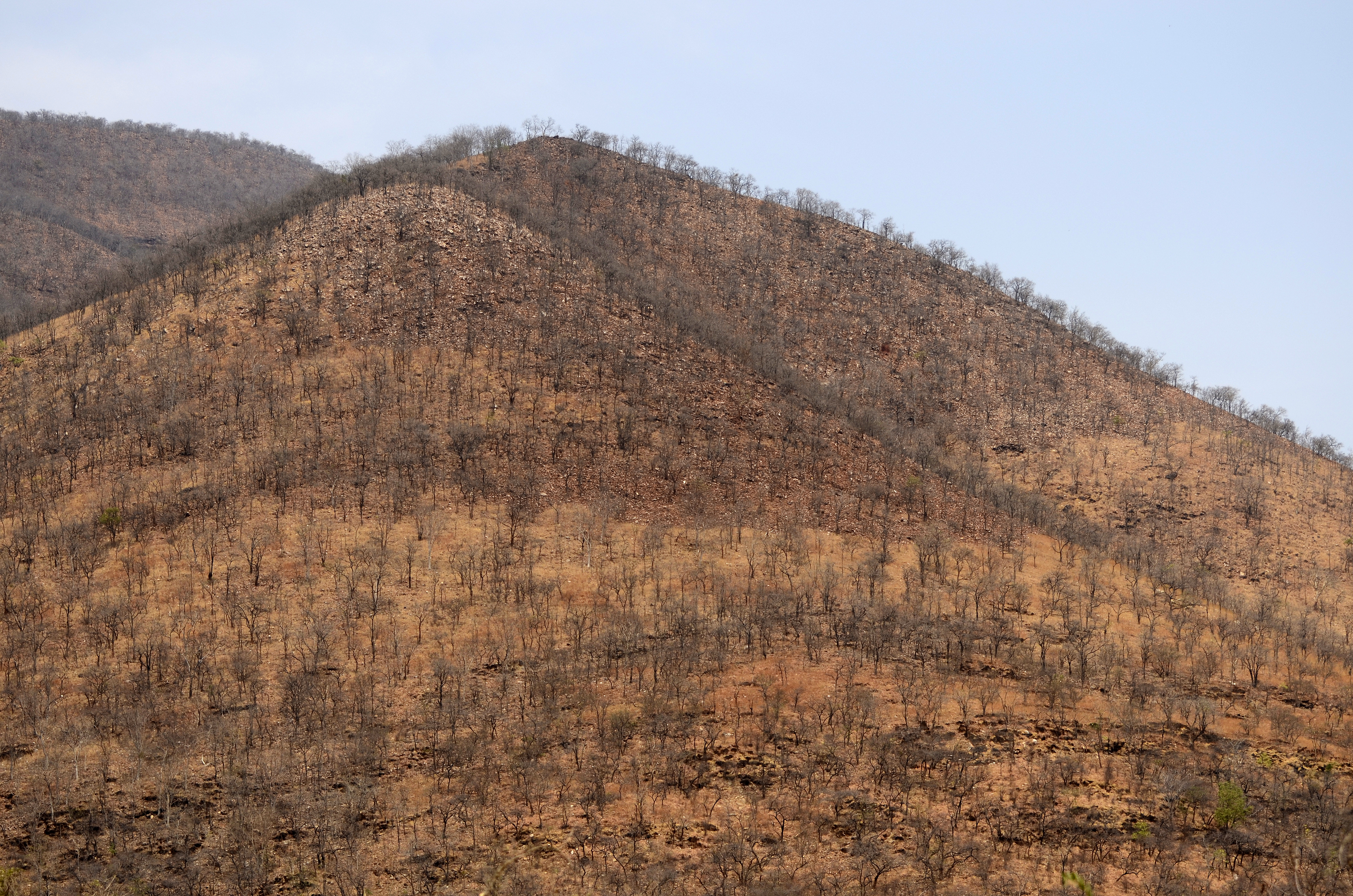
- Clockwise from top-left: Kodanda Rama Temple in Vontimitta, Chennakeshava Temple in Pushpagiri, Gandikota Fort Temple, Hills in Sri Lankamalleswara Wildlife Sanctuary, Soumyanathaswamy Temple, Nandalur
- Nickname: Gadapa
- Location of YSR Kadapa District in Andhra Pradesh
- Interactive map of Kadapa District
- Coordinates: 14.475°N 78.822°E
- Country: India
- State: Andhra Pradesh
- Region: Rayalaseema
- Established: 1808
- 1st Reorganized: 1953
- 2nd Reorganized: 4 April 2022
- 3rd Reorganized: 31 December 2025
- Named for: Y. S. Rajasekhara Reddy
- Headquarters: Kadapa
- Administrative Divisions: 5 Revenue divisions; 40 Mandals; 786 Villages; 9 Towns

Government
  - District collector: Sreedhar Cherukuri, I.A.S
  - Lok Sabha: Lok Sabha list: Kadapa; Rajampet (Partially)
  - Assembly: Assembly list: Badvel (SC); Rajampet; Kadapa; Pulivendla; Kamalapuram; Jammalamadugu; Proddatur; Mydukur

Area
  - Total: 12,507 km^{2} (4,829 sq mi)
  - Rank: 1st in Andhra Pradesh

Population (2011)
  - Total: 2,296,497
  - Rank: 2nd
  - Density: 188/km^{2} (490/sq mi)
  - Rank: 21st
  - Urban: 809,290
  - Rural: 1,251,364
  - Households: 706,204
  - Sex ratio: 985 (females per 1,000 males)

Languages
  - Official: Telugu; Urdu

Literacy
  - Literates: 1716766
- Time zone: UTC+5:30 (IST)
- Postal Index Number: 516xxx
- Area codes: +91–8562
- ISO 3166 code: IN-AP
- Vehicle registration: AP-04 (former) AP–39 (from 30 January 2019)
- District LGD code: 504
- District abbreviation: CUD
- Website: kadapa.ap.gov.in

Kadapa District, officially known as YSR Kadapa District is one of the twenty eight districts in the Indian state of Andhra Pradesh. In the 2022 reorganisation of Andhra Pradesh districts, the district boundary was largely restricted to the Kadapa parliamentary constituency area. It is one of the eight districts in the Rayalaseema region. Kadapa is the administrative headquarters for this district. After the rejoining of Rajampeta Revenue Division into the district in 2025, now the district has two parliamentary constituencies namely Rajampeta Parliamentary Constituency and Kadapa Parliamentary Constituency. The district has one collectrate (Kadapa) and one sub-collectrate (Rajampeta).

Barytes, limestone, asbestos, and uranium are major mineral resources of the district. The district is home to many religious and historic places of interest. Kodandarama Temple at Vontimitta, Sowyanadhaswami Temple at Nandalur, Attirala Sri Parasurama Swamy Temple at Rajampeta, Chennakesava Temple of Pushpagiri, Siddavatam Fort, and Gandikota Gorge are some of the famous sites located here.

Thallapaka Annamacharya, a 15th-century composer and singer, hailed from this district.

== Etymology ==
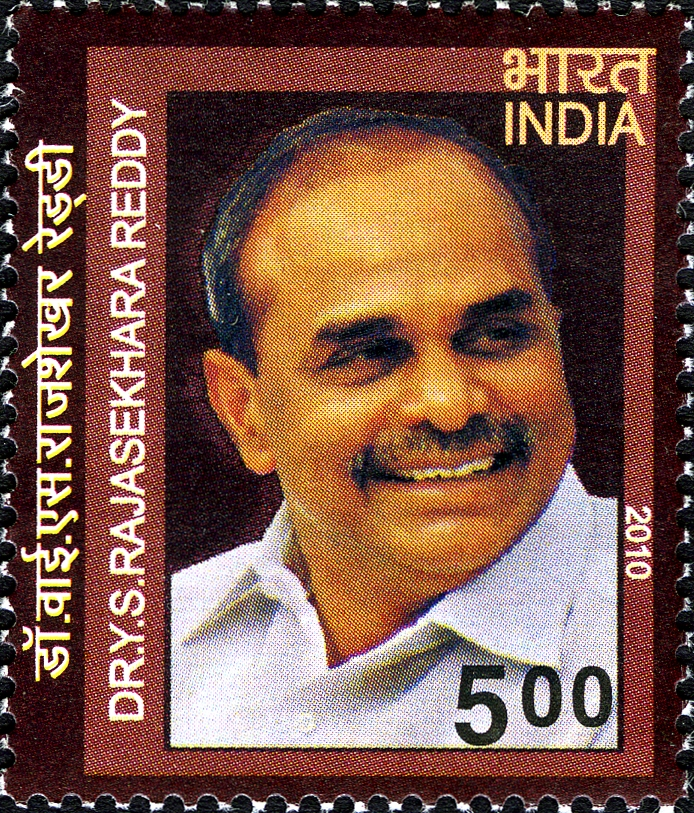
Y. S. Rajasekhara Reddy (YSR) Postal stamp

The historical records of the district reveal that Kadapa was previously called Gadapa which translates to "threshold" in Telugu. The ancient village of Kadapa, with its large tank and the temple of Lord Venkateswara at Devuni Kadapa, served as a convenient camping place for the myriads of pilgrims travelling to the holy shrine of Tirupati. On 19 August 2005, the nomenclature of "Cuddapah" was changed to "Kadapa" by the Government of Andhra Pradesh. In 2010, it was renamed as YSR district in honour of Y. S. Rajasekhara Reddy, the former chief minister of erstwhile Andhra Pradesh. In 2025, amid representations for the inclusion of Kadapa in the district's name, the government renamed it as YSR Kadapa district.

== History ==
This region was part of Maurya Empire, Satavahana dynasty, Chola dynasty, Pallava dynasty, Pandya dynasty, Bana kingdom, Rashtrakuta dynasty, Kakatiya dynasty, Vijayanagara Empire, Maratha Empire, kingdom of Mysore and Carnatic Sultanate during the course of its history upto medieval period. Later on it was ruled as part of British East India company.

=== Prehistory ===
Many paleolithic sites were found in Kadapa district, as the surroundings of Jammalamadugu, Mailavaram Dam and Gandikota. Some megalithic burial sites were explored near Porumamilla, Sankhavaram and at Yellatur village near Kadapa. The surroundings of Vontimitta are also noted as Megalithic cultural sites.

Paleolithic rock paintings found at Chintakunta caves near Muddanur in Kadapa district are said to be the second largest group of paintings in India after Bhimbetika rock art paintings. The rock paintings with mystic figures are also found at Dappalle village near Mylavaram Dam in Jammalamadugu Taluk of the district.

This region was ruled by the Mauryan Empire and the Satavahana Empire (Andhras). Buddhism flourished for many years along the banks of the rivers Cheyyeru and Penna. Jainism also had a place in Kadapa district history; the remnants of a buried Jain temple were found at Danavulapadu village on the banks of the Penna.

=== Medieval history ===
In the later half of 13th Century, this region was ruled from Vallur by Ambadeva. During his rule, the land survey was carried out. Subsequently, a Kakatiya King Pratapa rudra ruled the district with Warangal as the capital. Jyothi village located in Siddavatam mandal has 108 Shiva lingas on the bank of the river Penna which are dated to the rule of Kakatiyas.

In A.D.1309, Allah-ud-din Khilji defeated PratapaRudra and took over the region. In 1344, the confederation of Hindu kings overthrew the Muslim rule. This led to the formation of Vijayanagar Empire, who ruled the area for two centuries. Gandikota fort located on the bank of the Penna river was the citadel of Pemmasani Nayaks, commanders of Vijayanagar army. After the fall of Vijayanagar kingdom, this region came under the rule of Qutub shahis, who later became part of Mughal empire.

As part of Qutub Shahi rule, Riza Quli Beg under the title of Neknam Khan and his successors ruled the region with certain degree of autonomy. Later Abdul Nabi Khan was appointed as the governor of the district in the year 1714. The Marathas invaded and defeated the nawabs of Kurnool and Kadapa in 1740. Hyder Ali took over Gurramkonda and Kadapa from Marathas in 1760. He appointed his brother-in-law Mir Saheb in Kadapa district. Thus Mir Saheb became son first ruler of the district. This region was transferred to Nizam by the treaties of Mysore and Srirangapatnam.

=== Modern history ===
Nizam of Hyderabad ceded it to the British in 1800, and in 1808 it was divided to form Kadapa (spelt Cuddapah by the British) and Bellary districts. Munro was appointed as principal Collector over the ceded districts. Munro subjugated over 80 Palegars, instituted revenue collection system through which he secured the finances. The district headquarters were situated in Siddavatam but moved to Kadapa in 1812. On 4 April 2022, Annamayya district was formed from the parts of erstwhile YSR Kadapa district and others.

==== Demographics ====
As of 2011 census, Kadapa district has a population of 2,884,524. This gives it a ranking of 132 in India (out of a total of 640). The district has a population density of 188 inhabitants per square kilometre (490/sq mi) . Its population growth rate over the decade 2001–2011 was 10.87%. It has a sex ratio of 984 females for every 1000 males, and a literacy rate of 67.88%.

==== Economy ====
The Gross District Domestic Product (GDDP) of the district for FY 2013-14 is ₹26,342 crore (US$2.8 billion) and contributes 5% to the Gross State Domestic Product (GSDP). For the FY 2013–14, the per capita income at current prices was ₹70,821 (US$760). The primary, secondary and tertiary sectors of the district contribute ₹6,204 crore (US$660 million), ₹6,935 crore (US$740 million) and ₹13,203 crore (US$1.4 billion) respectively.

== Geography ==
Kadapa district occupies an area of 2,412,959.06 acres (9,764.8989 km^{2}; 3,770.24853 sq mi). The district is bordered by Nandyal and Markapuram districts to the north, Nellore district to the east, Tirupati district to the southeast, Annamayya district to the south, Sri Sathya Sai district to the southwest, and Anantapur district to the west.

The main rivers in this district are Penna, Cheyyeru, Kundu, Chitravathi, Papagni, and Sagileru. Vellikonda, Palakonda, Nallamalai, Lankamalai and Yerramalai are the major hill ranges in the district. The forests of Kadapa comprise fuel forests up to an elevation of 800 feet, red sanders lying between the elevation of 800 feet and 2,000 feet and Shorea Eugenia at elevations of more than 2,000 feet. The district has a forest cover of 28.49%.

=== Fauna ===
The Bonnet monkey (Macaca Radiata) also known as the Madras Langur is common. Tiger and Panther can be seen in the interior areas of Nallamalas, Lankamalas, Palakonda-Seshachalam and Velikonda forests. mungoose, jackal, fox, wolves, wild dogs, bear, the Malabar squirrel, porcupine, the Indian antelope, Indian gazelle, Blue bull, sambar, deer and wild pigs are also found in the forests. Grey partridge known as Kamju, the quail, the Jungle fowl, the dove, pigeon and wild goose are the other common birds found in this district.

=== Soil ===
Red ferruginous and Black soils are common in the district. Fertile black clay soil occupies 23.7% area.

=== Minerals ===
Barytes, Lime Stone and Asbestos are the major minerals. Napa slabs, road metal, building stone, marble, are also found in the district. Limestone is available in Yerraguntla. National Mineral Development Corporation is extracting asbestos in Brahman palli and barytes in Mangampet. Kadapa is also famous for its stone called "kadapa stone" used in building construction and for slabs especially in south India. In Tummalapalle, there are 49,000 tonnes of confirmed uranium deposits which are mined and processed locally.

=== Climate ===
The summer season is spread over March–May. This is followed by the South-West monsoon during June - September. North East monsoon season is spread over October–November. December–February is the winter or cold season. The average annual rainfall is 572.25 mm. The rainfall generally increases from the North-West to the South-East. October is the month with maximum rainfall.

== Demographics ==
Religions in Kadapa district based on 2011 census
Religion	Percent
Hinduism	83.13%
Islam	15.39%
Christianity	0.94%
Other or not stated	0.54%

After reorganization in 2022 and 2025, the district had a population of 2,297,097, of which 875,658 (38.12%) lived in urban areas. Kadapa district had a sex ratio of 986 females per 1000 males. Scheduled Castes and Scheduled Tribes make up 376,489 (16.39%) and 50,942 (2.22%) of the population respectively. Hinduism is the dominant religion with 83.13% followers followed by Islam with 15.39% followers.

Languages of Kadapa district based on 2011 Census
1. Telugu (84.52%)
2. Urdu (14.45%)
3. Others (1.03%)

Based on the 2011 census, as computed for the revised district boundaries of 2025, 84.52% of the population spoke Telugu and 14.45% Urdu as their first language.

== Administrative divisions ==
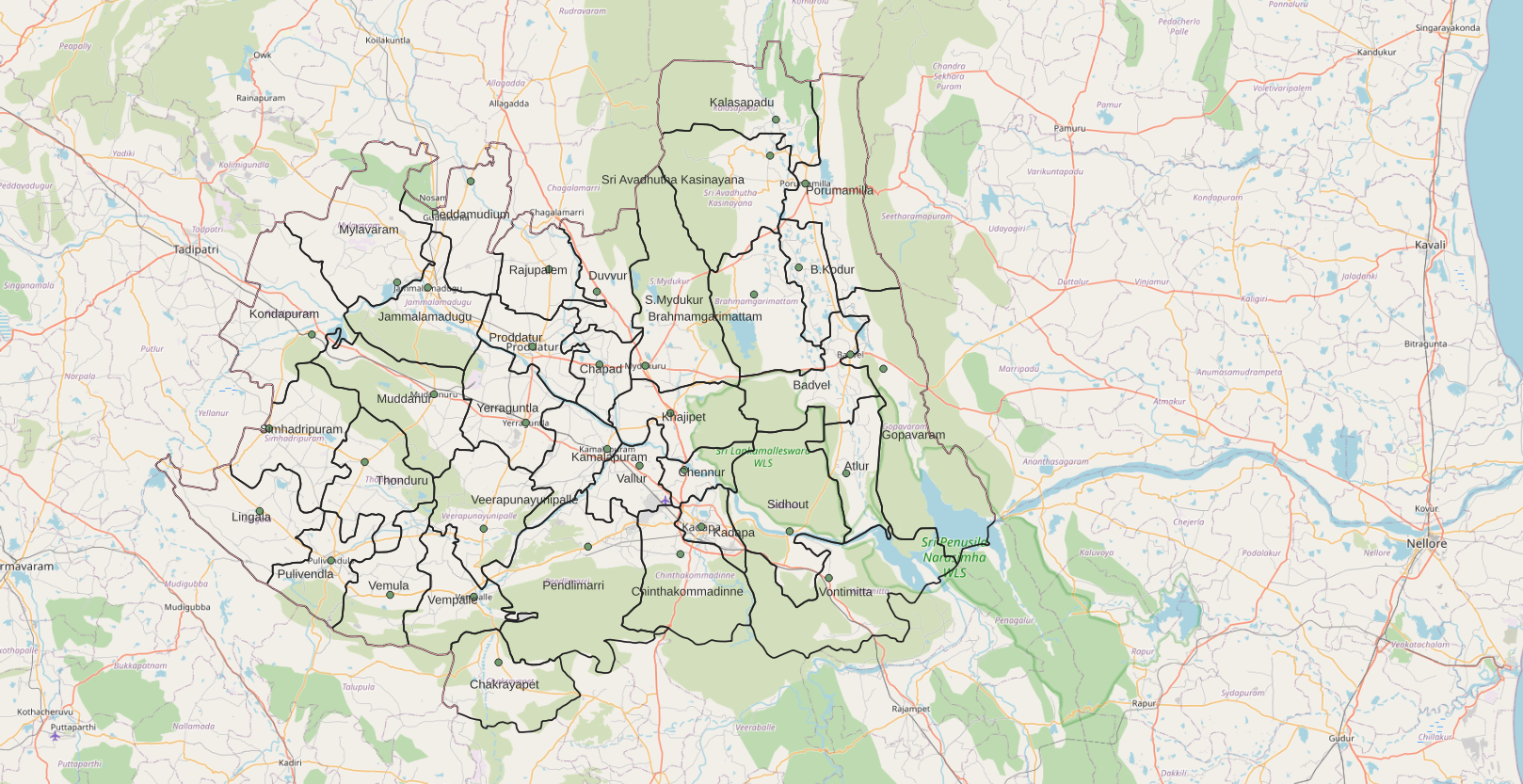
Satellite view of YSR district

The district is divided into 5 revenue divisions: Rajampet, Badvel, Jammalamadugu, Kadapa and Pulivendula, which are further subdivided into a total of 40 mandals, each headed by a sub-collector.

=== Mandals ===
The list of 40 mandals in YSR district, divided into 5 revenue divisions, is given below.

1. Badvel revenue division
  1. Atlur
  2. B. Kodur
  3. Badvel
  4. Brahmamgari Matam
  5. Chapadu
  6. Duvvur
  7. Gopavaram
  8. Kalasapadu
  9. Khajipeta
  10. Mydukur
  11. Porumamilla
  12. Sri Avadhutha Kasinayana
2. Jammalamadugu revenue division
  1. Jammalamadugu
  2. Kondapuram
  3. Muddanur
  4. Mylavaram
  5. Peddamudium
  6. Proddatur
  7. Rajupalem
3. Kadapa revenue division
  1. Chennur
  2. Chinthakommadinne
  3. Kadapa
  4. Kamalapuram
  5. Pendlimarri
  6. Siddavatam
  7. Vallur
  8. Vontimitta
  9. Yerraguntla
4. Pulivendula revenue division
  1. Chakarayapet
  2. Lingala
  3. Pulivendula
  4. Simhadripuram
  5. Thondur
  6. Veerapunayunipalle
  7. Vempalle
  8. Vemula
5. Rajampeta revenue division
  1. Nandalur
  2. Rajampeta
  3. Veeraballi
  4. T. Sundupalle

== Cities and towns ==
There are 1 municipal corporation, 5 municipalities, and 2 nagar panchayats in the district.

Municipal bodies in YSR District
Ciy/Town	Civil status	Revenue division	Population (2011)
Kadapa	Municipal Corporation	Kadapa	344,893
Proddatur	Municipality Special Grade	Jammalamadugu	217,786
Rajampet	Municipality special Grade -2	Rajampeta	75,457
Badvel	Municipality Grade-2	Badvel	70,626
Pulivendula	Municipality Grade-1	Pulivendula	70,650
Jammalamadugu	Municipality	Jammalamadugu	61,218
Mydukur	Municipality Grade-3	Jammalamadugu	45,790
Yerraguntla	Nagar Panchayat	Kadapa	32,574
Kamalapuram	Nagar Panchayat	Kadapa	20,623

upgraded in 2019

== Politics and government ==
The district is covered by Kadapa (fully) and Rajampet (partially) parliamentary constituencies. The assembly constituencies covering the district are given below.

Constituency number	Name	Reserved for (SC/ST/None)	Parliamentary constituency
124	Badvel	SC	Kadapa
131	Jammalamadugu	None	Kadapa
126	Kadapa	None	Kadapa
130	Kamalapuram	None	Kadapa
133	Mydukur	None	Kadapa
132	Proddatur	None	Kadapa
129	Pulivendula	None	Kadapa
125	Rajampet	None	Rajampet

== Economy ==
Agriculture contributes a major share to the economy. Paddy, groundnut, sunflower, cotton, betel leaves, mango, papaya, banana, lemon and sweet orange are the major crops cultivated in the district. As per 2019-20, the gross cropped area in the district is 253,458 hectares, out of which 114,410 hectares were irrigated.

=== Irrigation ===
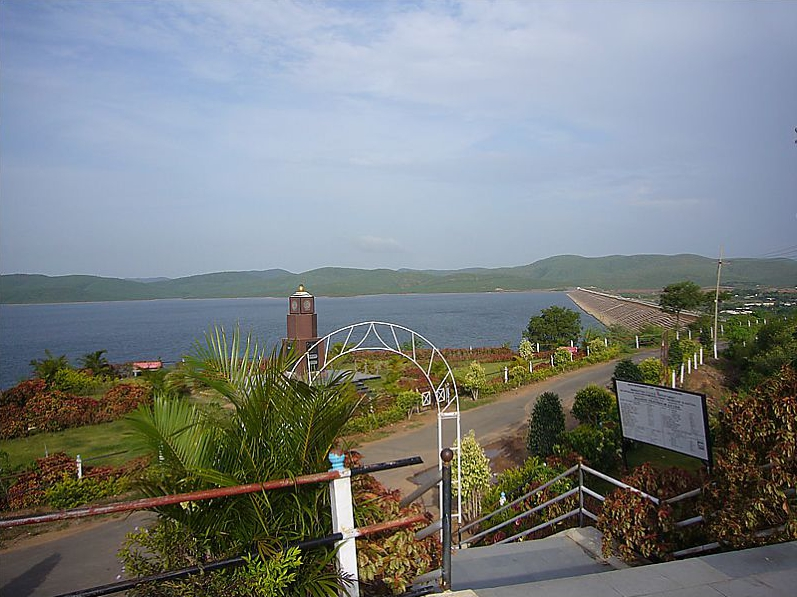
Brahmamsagar

Starting at Sunkesula Dam on the Tungabhadra river, the Kurnool - Cuddapa Canal (K. C. Canal) flows through the district providing water to 40 km^{2} (15 sq mi) of cultivable land. The main source of drinking water to this district is Galeru Nagari Sujala Sravanthi Project Canal.

There is one major irrigation project on the river Penna at Mylavaram. There are 4 medium irrigation projects, namely Lower Sagileru Project, Upper Sagileru Project, BrahmamSagar Project and Pulivendula Branch Canal. These form several reservoirs such as Brahmamsagar Reservoir, Mylavaram Dam Reservoir, Annamayya Project reservoir and Gandikota Reservoir.

=== Energy ===
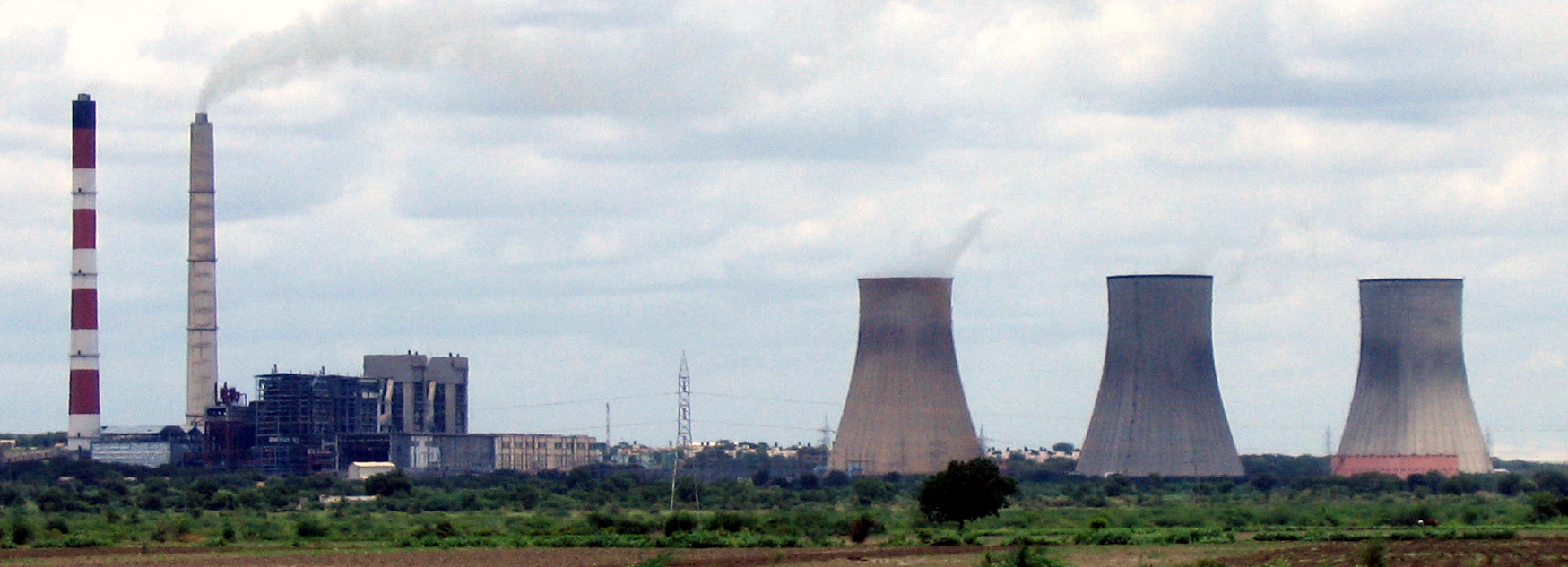
Rayalaseema Thermal Power Station

Rayalaseema Thermal Power Station with a capacity of 1650MW is one of the biggest coal-based power plants. It is located near Proddatur.

=== Industries ===
The district has 29 large and medium scale industries with an investment of ₹1,022,943 crore (US$110 billion) providing employment to 19,410. It also has 2335 small scale units employing 21,294 persons with an investment of ₹688.59 crore (US$74 million). The Tummalapalle uranium mine was commissioned in 2012 to extract uranium from ore.

== Transport ==
=== Roadways ===
The district has 864.02 km (536.88 mi) of State Highway and 325.28 km (202.12 mi) of National Highway. The district also has 6174.69 KMs of BT roads. 727.03 of CC road and 1458.48 KMs of metal roads. National Highway 40, National Highway 716 and National Highway 67 pass through the district.

=== Railways ===
The district has broad-gauge railway line of 195.13 km (121.25 mi). There are 14 railway stations covering 7 Mandals. Kadapa, Yerraguntla Junction, Proddatur and Jammalamadugu are the major railway stations from the district under Guntakal railway division.

=== Airways ===
Kadapa Airport is a small airport located north west to Kadapa city. Tirupati Airport is the nearest bigger airport at a distance of 139 Kms from Kadapa city.

== Education ==
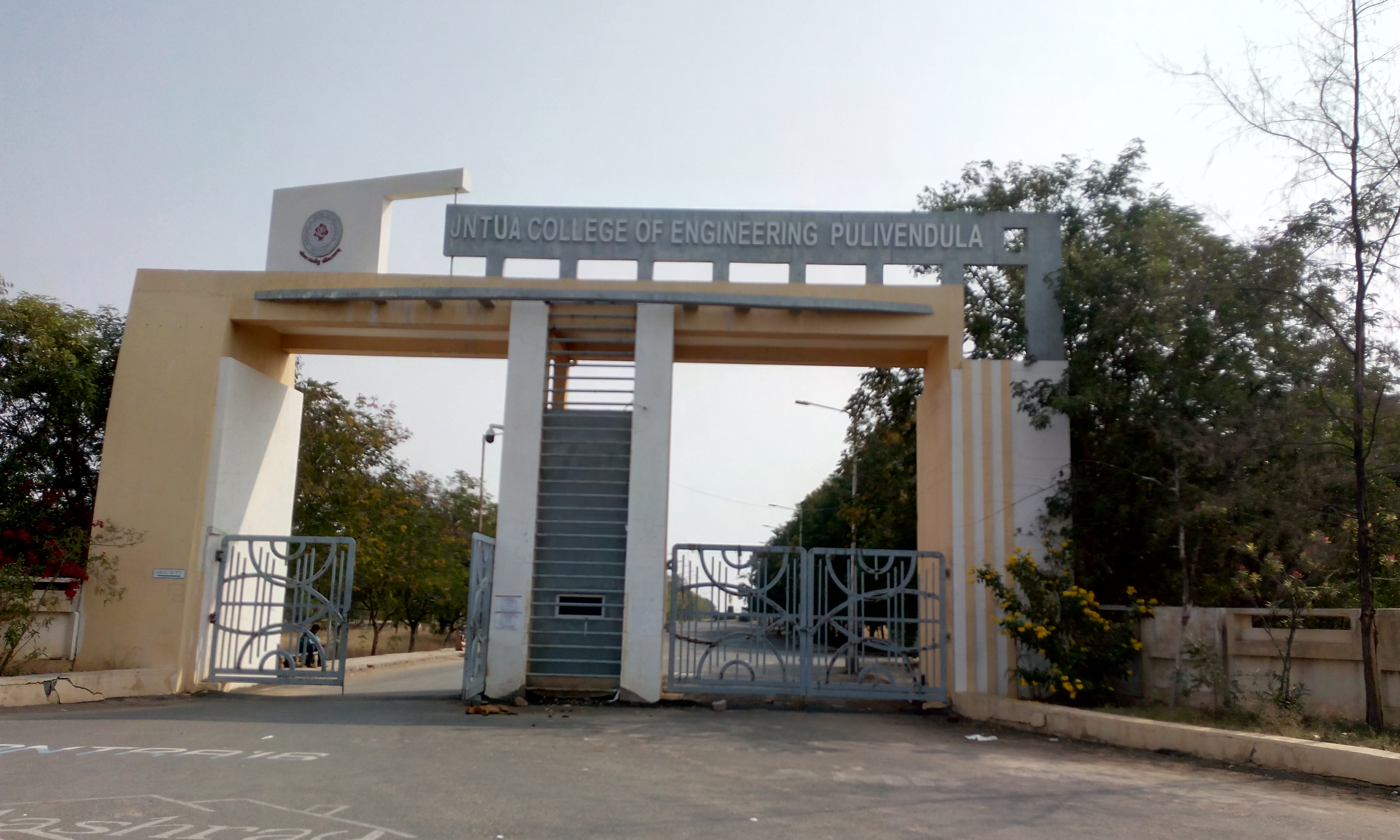
JNTUACEP entrance, Pulivendula

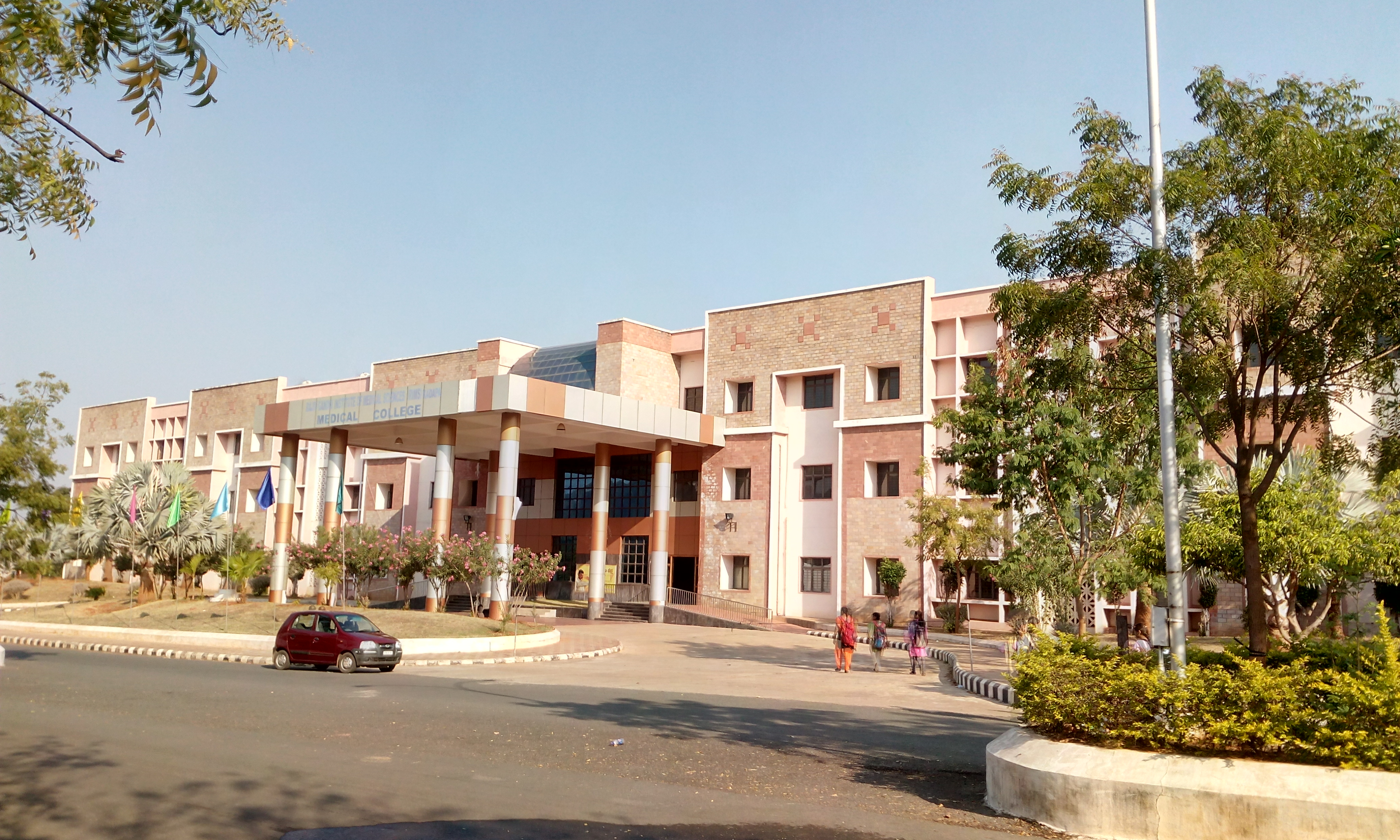
RIMS Medical College, Kadapa

The district has 2001 Primary Schools, 468 Upper Primary Schools, 683 High Schools, 142 Junior Colleges, 48 Degree Colleges. It also has 120 Polytechnics, Engineering colleges and Govt. Aided Professional & Special Education Colleges. Rajiv Gandhi Institute of Medical Sciences (RIMS), one Dental college, one Homoeopathic Medical college, one Veterinary college and one IIIT centre at Rajiv Knowledge Valley, Idupulapaya of Vempalle mandal are also present in the district.

JNTUA College of Engineering, Pulivendula is one of the government engineering colleges in the district. Yogi Vemana University offers P.G. courses for general education. CP Brown library in Kadapa is famous for its collection of manuscripts collected by CP Brown. Annamacharya University is located in Rajampeta.

== Tourism ==
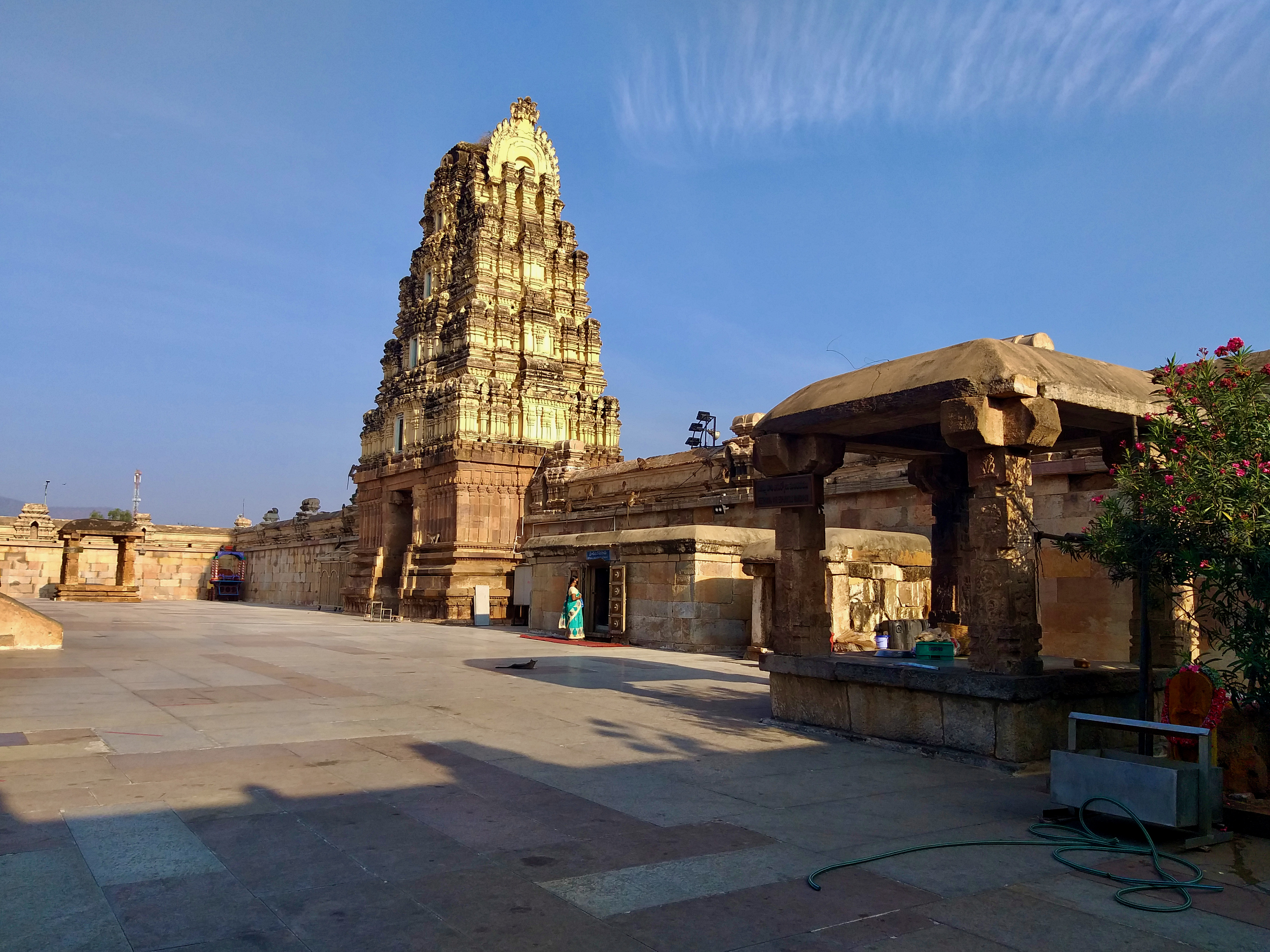
Kodandarama Temple, Vontimitta

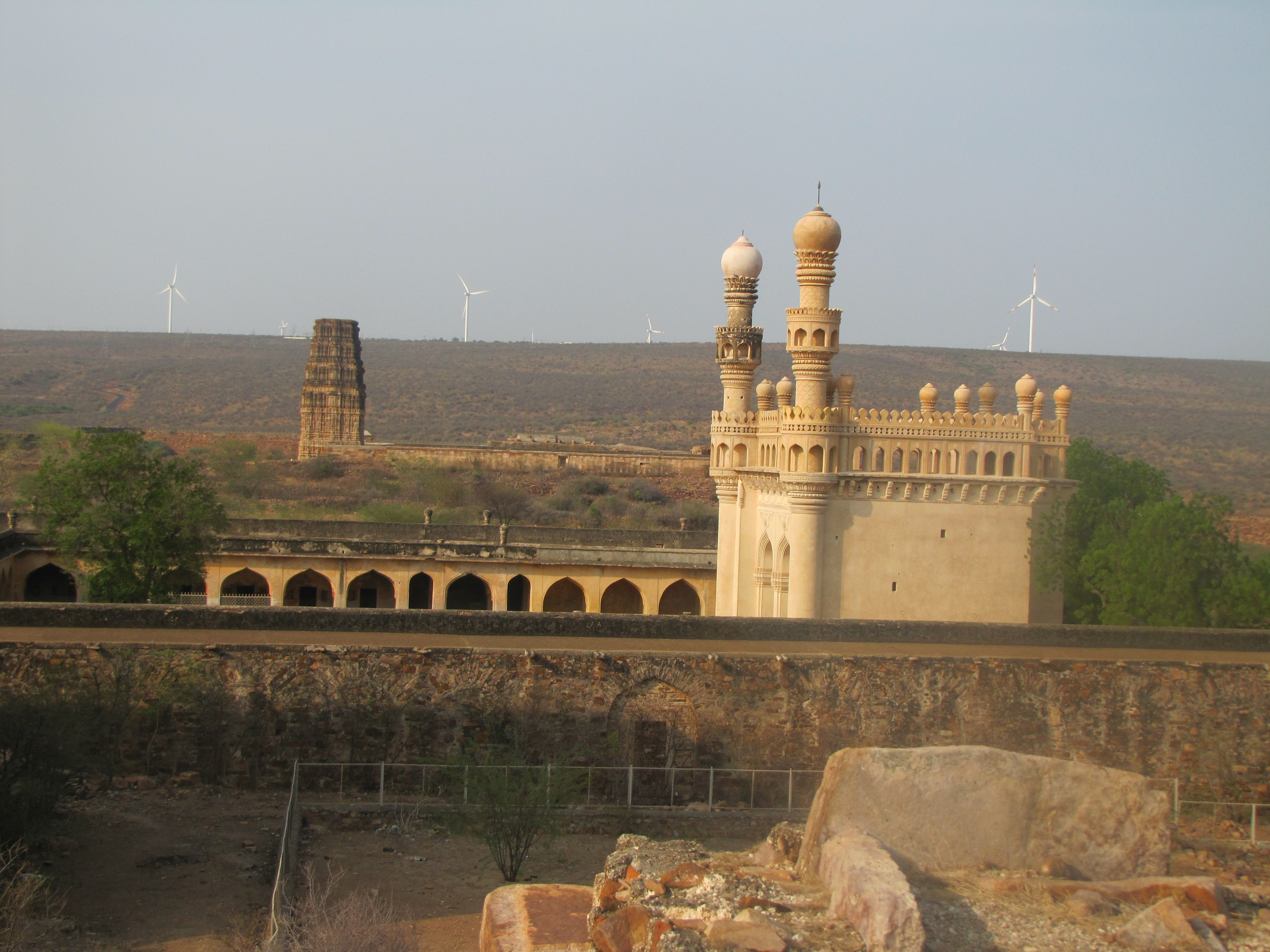
Jamia Masjid and Madhavaraya Swamy Temple at Gandikota

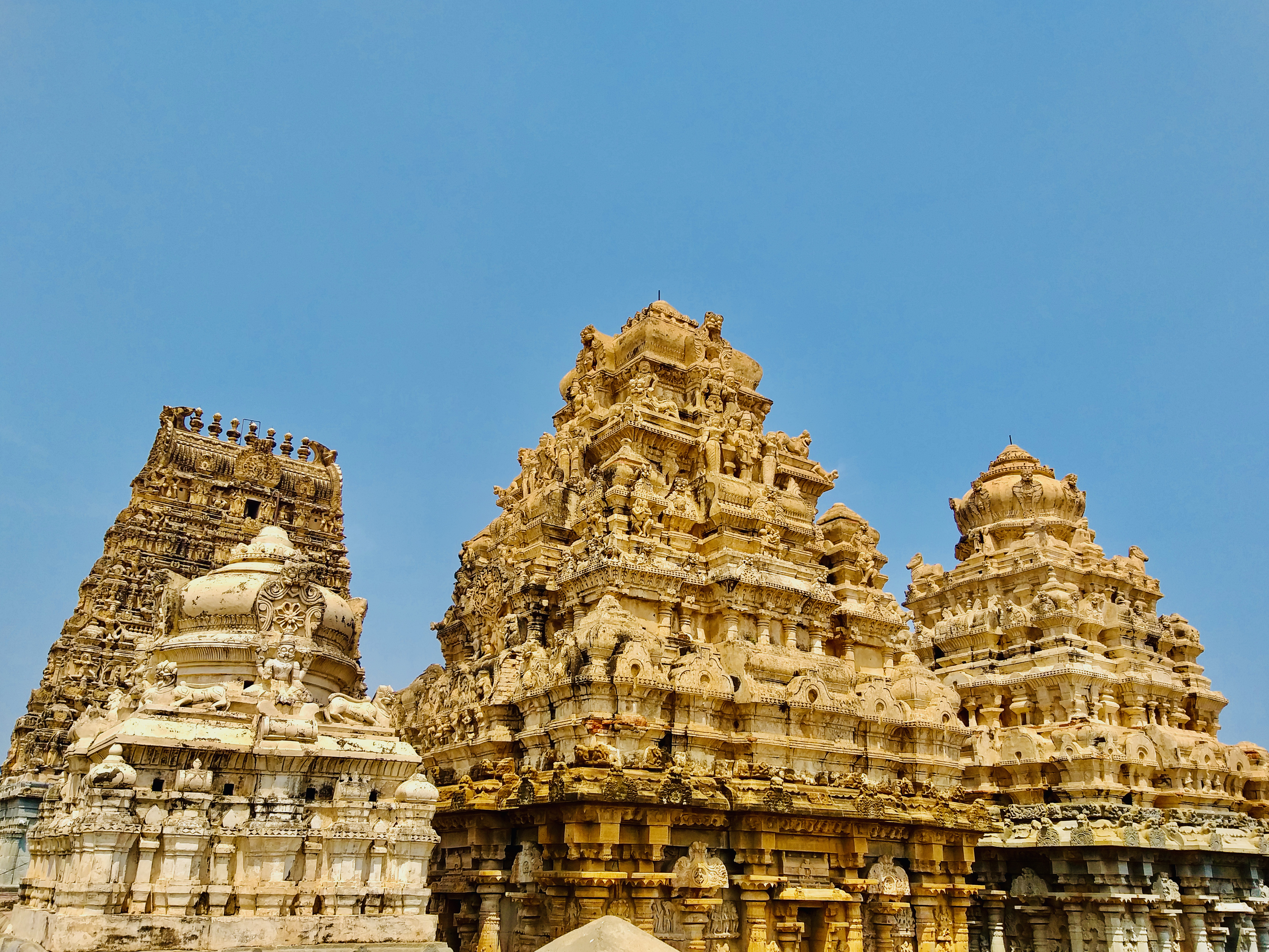
Chennakeshava temple at Pushpagiri

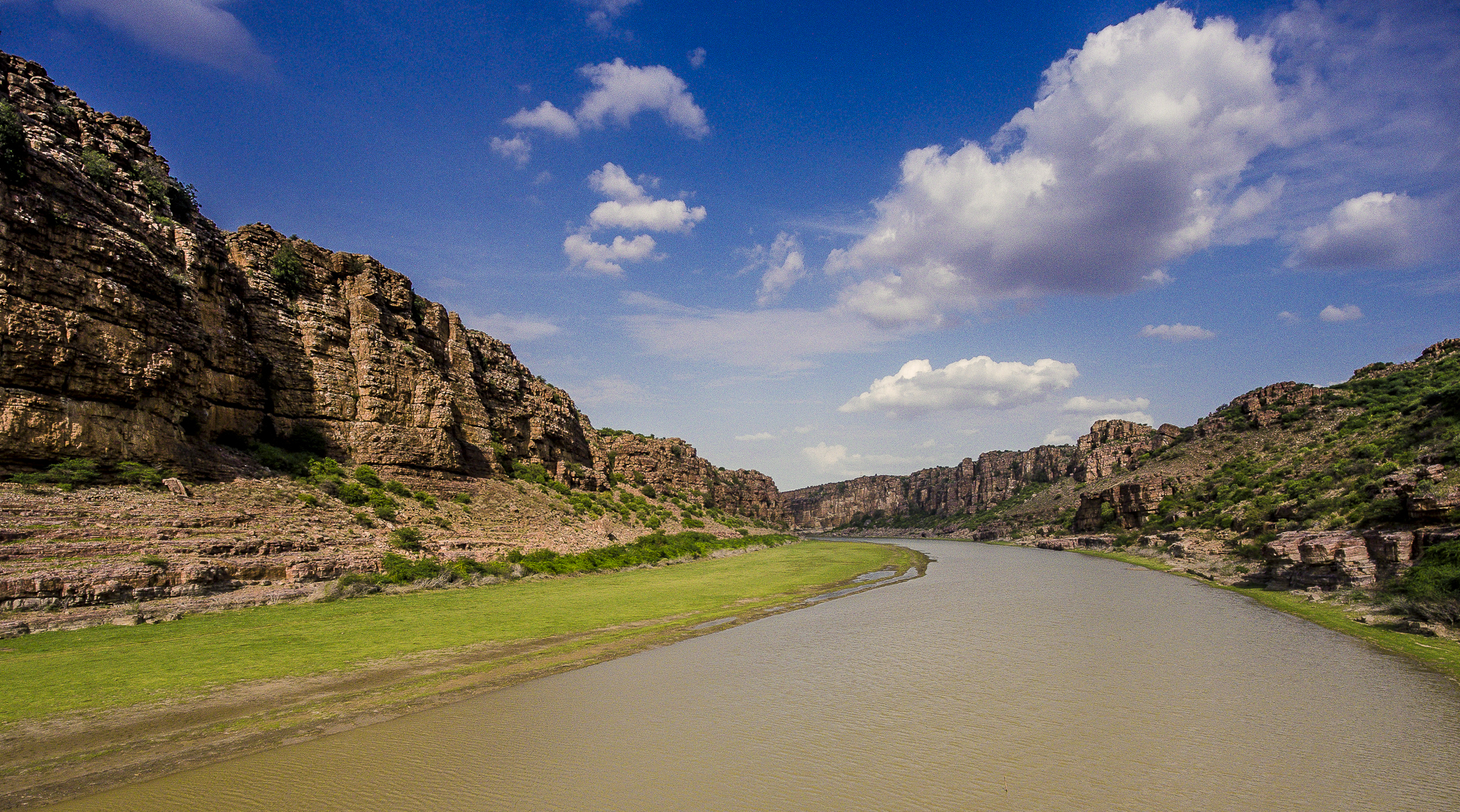
Gandikota gorge

Siddavatam (Sidhout), which is 25 km from Kadapa town, is famous for its fort and temples. Matli Maharajas built the fort in A.D. 1303. Hyder Ali destroyed it in 1770. The fort is spread over an area of 30 acres and has 17 bastions. It is called the southern gate way of Srisailam. Brahmamgari Matham (B. Mattam), is the place where SreeVeerabrahmendra Swamy, a 17th-century saint and clairvoyant entered Jeevasamadhi. The annual prayer festival is held for 6 days in the month of Vysakha.

Kodandarama Temple dedicated to the god Rama, is located in Vontimitta. The temple is built in Vijayanagara architectural style and is dated to the 16th century. This inspired Pothana to compose Andhra Maha Bhagavatham. It is located at a distance of 25 kilometres (16 mi) from Kadapa. Some of the other tourist attractions are Chennakesava temple of Pushpagiri, Madhavaraya temple at Gandikota.

Sowyanadhaswami temple at Nandalur, Attirala, Sri Parasurama Swamy temple in Rajampeta, and Sri Thallapaka Annamacharya in Rajampeta are also located in Kadapa district. The Annamayya dam on the Cheyyeru River is also located in the district.

Gandikota gorge was formed in the Erramala range of hills. The river Penna flows in the gorge with a width of 100 m.

== Notable people ==
- Tallapaka Annamacharya (1408–1503) was a 15th-century Hindu saint and the earliest known Telugu Vaggeyakara (composer-singer) who composed approximately 32,000 devotional songs (Sankeerthanas) in praise of Lord Venkateswara of Tirumala. Revered as Andhra Pada Kavita Pitamaha (Grandfather of Telugu song-writing), his compositions significantly influenced Carnatic music and advocated for social equality.
- Vemana was a philosopher and poet. His poems in simple language on social, moral, satirical and mystical themes are commonly recited by Telugu people.
- Potuluri Veerabrahmam, a 16th-century saint and clairvoyant, is known for his work Kalagnanam, a book of predictions written in Telugu.
- Atukuri Molla was a poet of the 16th century. She wrote Molla Ramayanam in simple language.
- Charles Philip Brown served as district collector of Cuddapa during British rule. He took lot of interest in Telugu language, collected several manuscripts, published Vemana poems.
- Y. S. Rajasekhara Reddy was born in Pulivendula. He rose to become chief minister of combined Andhra Pradesh.
- B. Padmanabham acted as a comedian in over 400 films spanning a career of over six decades was born in Pulivendula.
- Y. V. Reddy, Former RBI Governor
- Shree Charani, is an Indian international cricketer. She is a talented left-arm orthodox spinner who represents the Indian women's national cricket team. Charani was part of the Indian team that won the 2025 Women's Cricket World Cup.
