= Thimmakka =

Thimmakka may refer to:

- Saalumarada Thimmakka (1911–2025), Indian environmentalist from the state of Karnataka
- Timmakka, popular name of Tallapaka Tirumalamma, a famous 15th century Telugu poet
