= Kodandarama Temple, Vontimitta =

Hindu temple in Vontimitta, India

Kodanda Rama Swamy Temple కోదండరామస్వామి ఆలయం
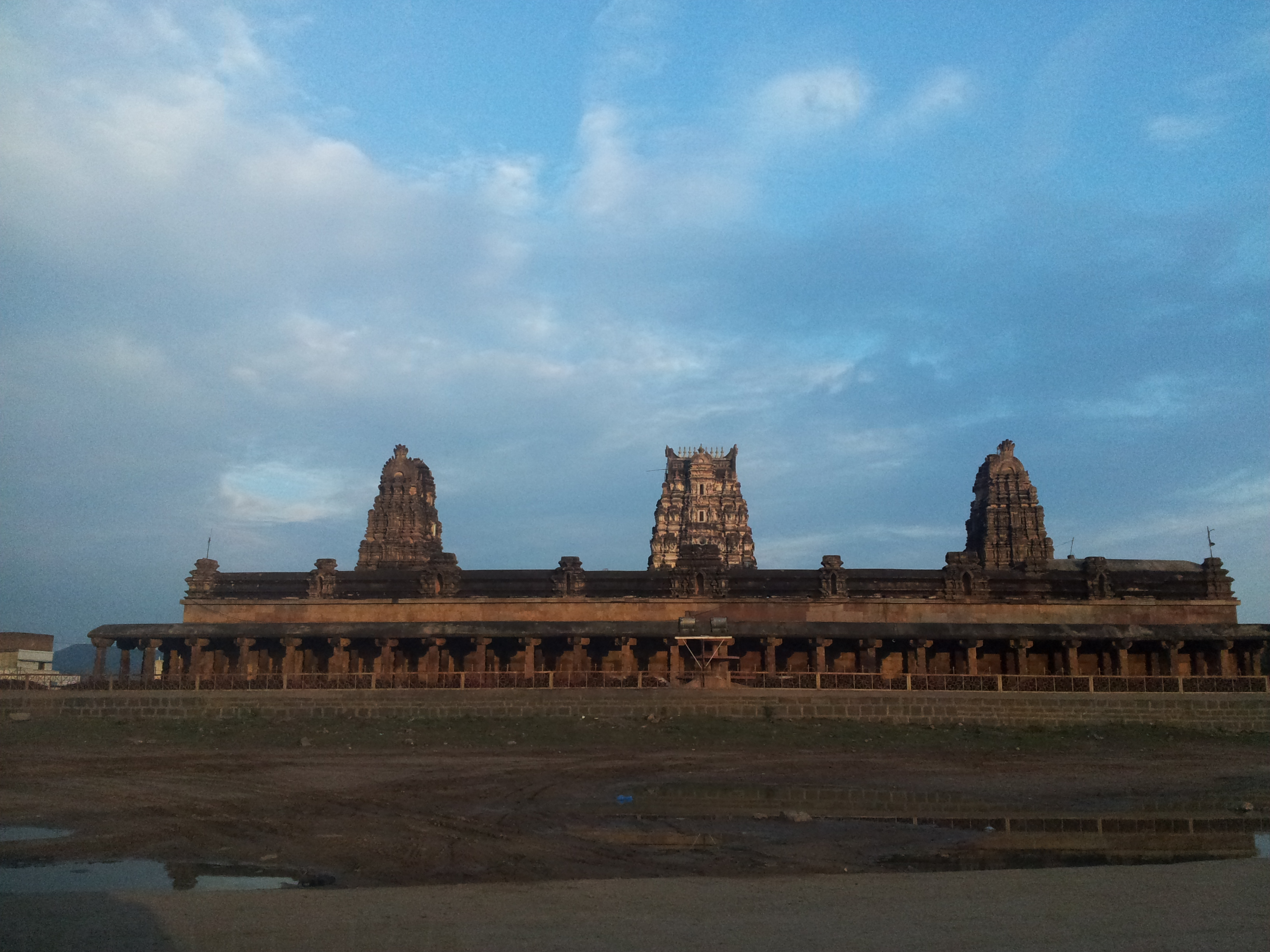
- View of the Kodandarama Swamy Temple in Vontimitta

- Location in Vontimitta (M), Kadapa (D), Andhra Pradesh

Religion
- Affiliation: Hinduism
- District: Kadapa
- Deity: Sita Rama
- Festival: Sri Rama Navami

Location
- Location: Vontimitta
- State: Andhra
- Country: India
- Coordinates: 14.3833°N 79.0333°E

Architecture
- Type: Dravidian architecture
- Creator: Chola and Vijayanagara Kings
- Completed: 16th century

Specifications
- Monument: 3
- Elevation: 151 m (495 ft)

Kodandarama Temple is a Hindu temple dedicated to the god Rama, located in Vontimitta town in Vontimitta mandal of Kadapa district in the Indian state of Andhra. The temple, an example of Vijayanagara architectural style, is dated to the 16th century. It is stated to be the largest temple in the region. It is located at a distance of 25 kilometres (16 mi) from Kadapa and is close to Rajampet. The temple and its adjoining buildings are one of the centrally protected monuments of national importance.

== Legend ==
According to the local legend, the temple was built by Vontudu and Mittudu they was nishada(boya) vamsha, who were robbers-turned-devotees of Rama. After building the temple, they are said to have turned into stone.

== History ==
The temple was built during the reign of Cholakings Agnikulas and Vijayanagara kings around the 16th century.

Bammera Potana who lived in Vontimitta wrote his magnum opus Maha Bhagavatham in Telugu language and dedicated it to Rama. Vavilakolanu Subba Rao, known as ‘Andhra Valmiki’ for translating Valmiki’s Ramayana (the Hindu epic that narrates Rama's tale) into Telugu also spent his time here worshipping Rama. The saint-poet Annamacharya is said to have visited the temple and composed and sang songs or kirtans in praise of Rama. Jean-Baptiste Tavernier, a French traveler who had visited this temple in 1652, appreciated the elegance of the temple's architecture.

== Features ==
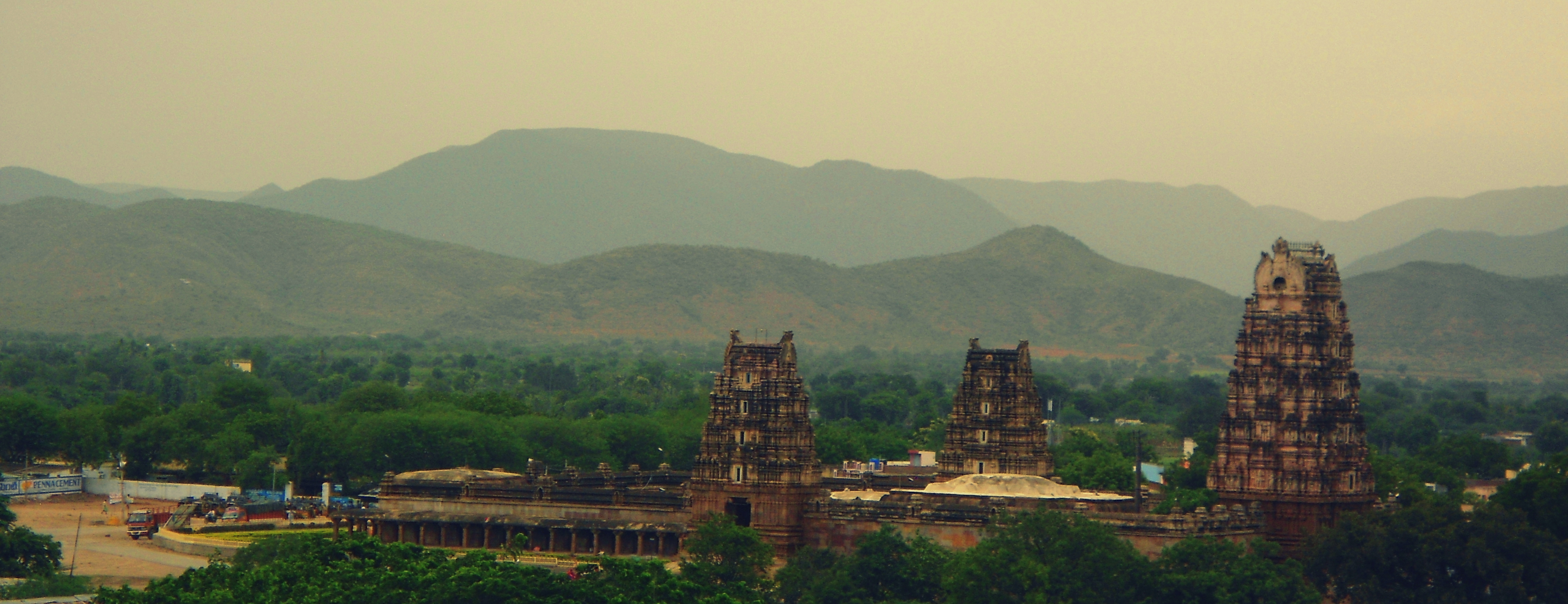
Aerial view of the temple

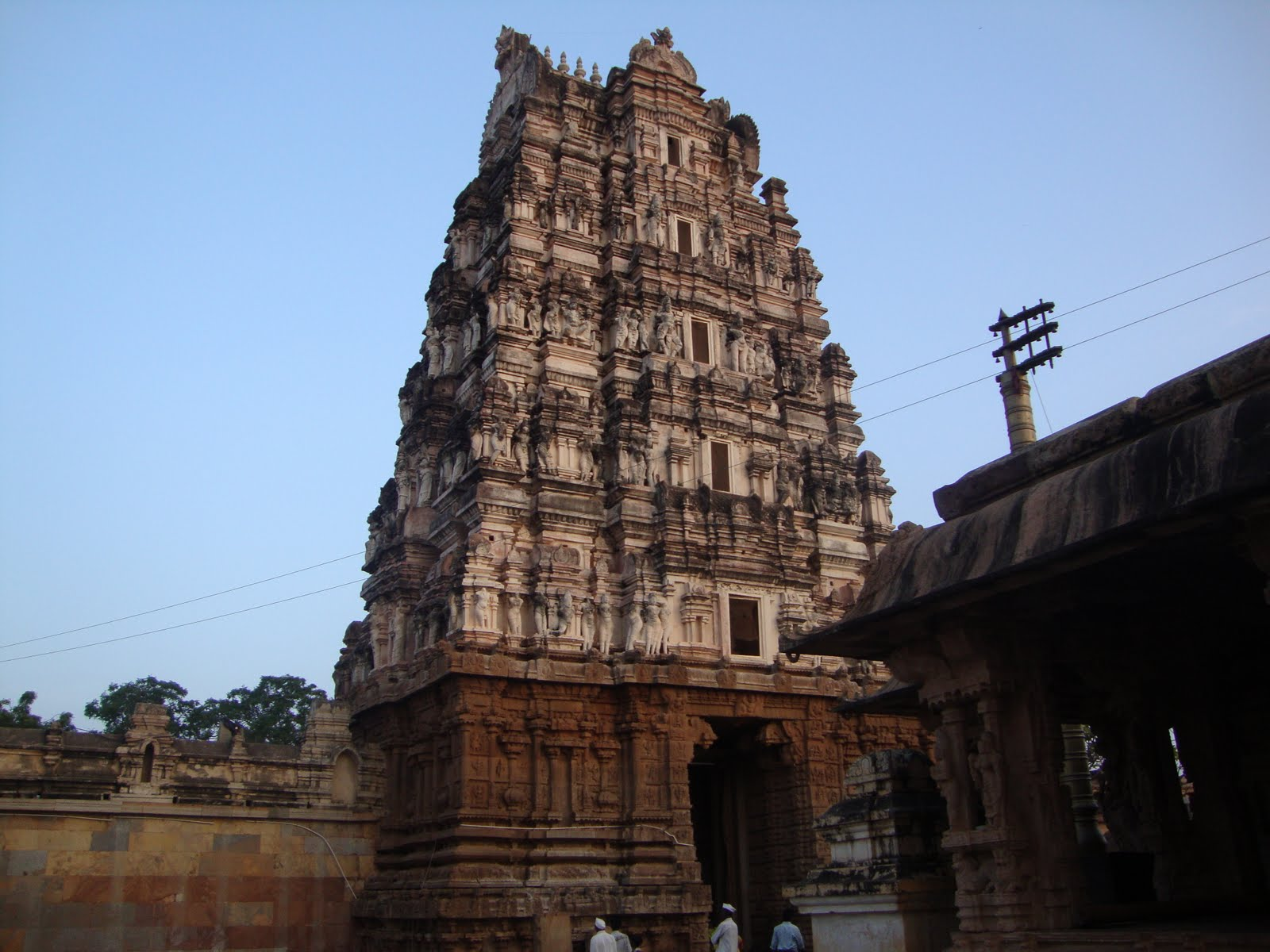
View of the Temple's main entrance gopuram

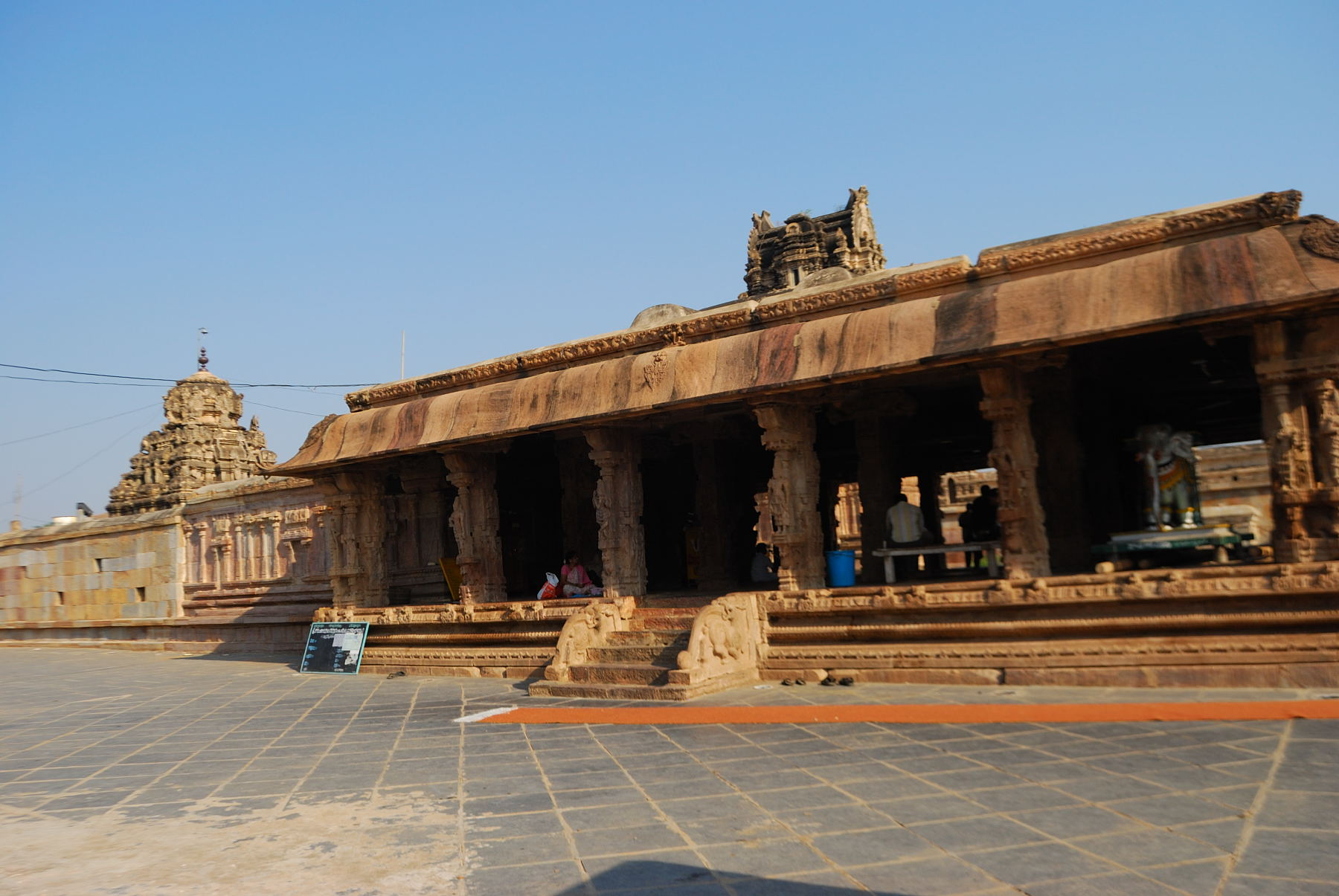
View of Rangamantapam inside the temple

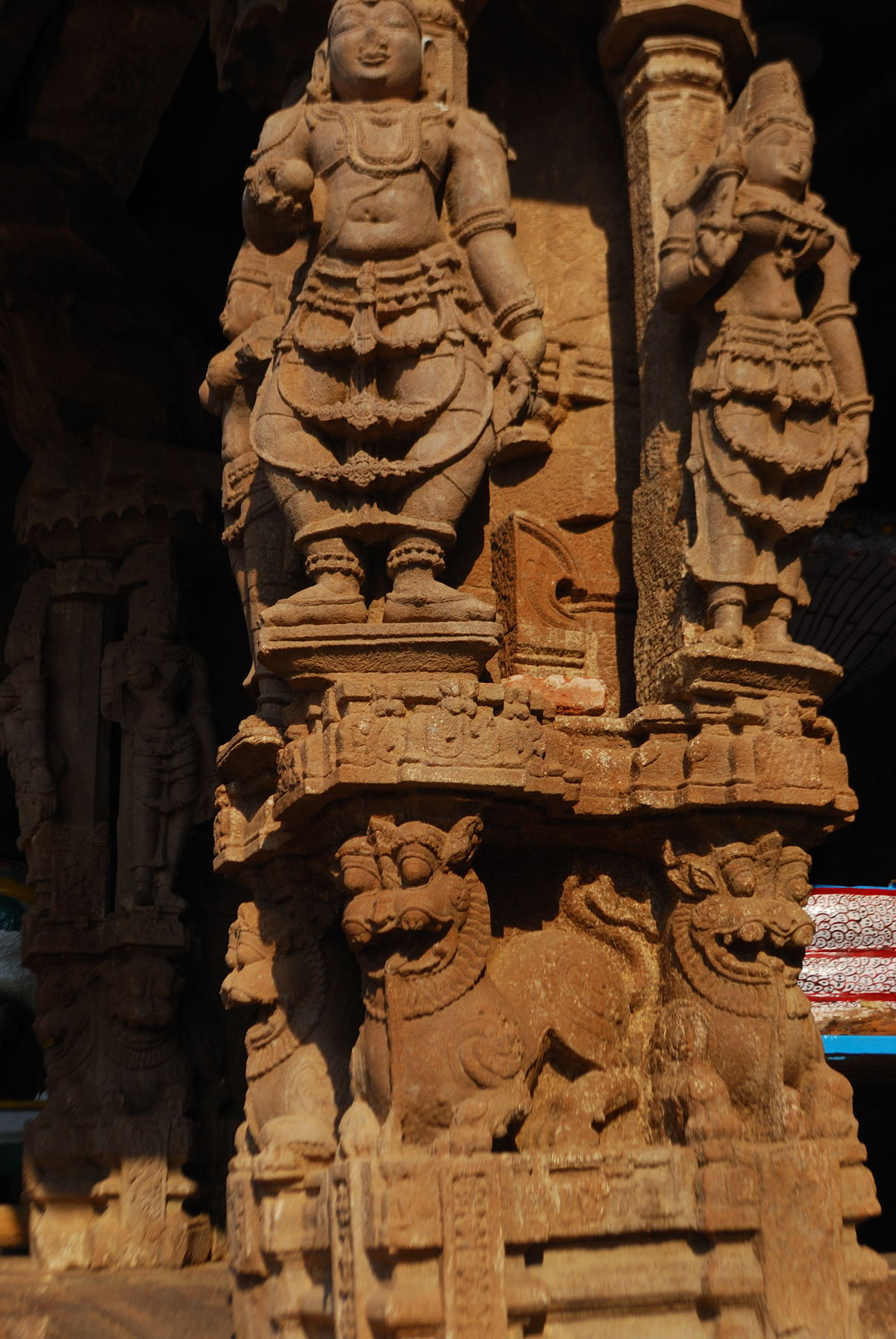
Intricate carvings on one of the stone pillars in the mandapam

The temple, the largest in the region is built in Vijayanagara style of architecture, in the "Sandhara" order within a rectangular yard enclosed by walls. The temple, located 16 kilometres (9.9 mi) from Siddhout via Bakarapeta, is architecturally elegant and impressive. It has three ornate Gopurams (towers) of which the central tower, which faces east, is the entrance gateway to the temple; the other two towers face north and south. This central tower is built in five tiers, and a number of steps are provided to access the approach gate of the tower.

The mandapa or the Rangamantapam, the open-air theatre, has exquisite sculptures. As the mandapa is supported over 32 pillars it is known as Madhyarangaradapam. The colonnades in the mandapa have carved figurines of attendant apsaras (nymphs). The columns of the central support system on the southern side display carvings of the gods Krishna and Vishnu. Each of the corner columns have three layers carved with images of apsaras and deities. In the central part of the mandapa, there are piers which are adorned with images of the mythical creatures yali. The roof of the central part is built up with many decorative brackets or corbels. In one of the columns of the mandapa, images of Rama and his brother Lakshmana are sculpted. Rama is shown here in a standing position with bow in the right hand and arrow in the left hand. Other decorative art depiction in Rama's image consists of Kundalas (ear-rings), haras (garlands), valayas, yagnopavita (sacred thread) and so forth. Lakshmana's figure is sculpted in tribhanga posture with his right hand held down free while the left hand holds a bow. Adornments carved on this image are kirtimukuta (conical crown), graivevakas, channavira, udarbandha (waist band), yagnopavita and purnaruka. Krishna is in dvibhanga posture with the left leg firmly on the ground and the right leg bent at the knee and crossed over the left leg, a style termed as Vyatyastapada. Of his two arms, the right hand is shown holding the Govardhan Hill while the other is rested on kati. The image is ornamented with kirtimukuta and many more other ornaments. Two cows are also depicted by his side.

The sanctum sanctorum or garbhagriha is approached from the mandapa through an antaraalayam or inner chamber, which is adorned with sculptures. In the garbhagriha, the central icon of Rama along with his consort Sita and Lakshmana are carved as a composite image, out of a single rock. It is also inferred that the garbhagriha is itself carved out of a single block. The Hanuman, Rama's devotee, who is generally shown with the trio is missing here. However, there is a separate temple for Hanuman here. There is also an image of Ganesha in a dancing posture in the mandapam.

The state government has decided to take over the upkeep of this temple, which is presently with the Archaeological Survey of India (ASI). This temple is notified as an Ancient Monument (N-AP-50) by ASI. The two sacred water tanks – Rama theertham and Lakshmana theertham – are located in the precincts of the temple.

== Administration ==
The Administration of the Temple is entrusted to the Tirumala Tirupati Devasthanams (TTD) by the Government of Andhra Pradesh. The TTD board had passed a resolution on 29 July 2015 to get the temple under its administrative control.

== Festival ==
Rama Navami, the birthday of Rama, was officially celebrated by the Government of Andhra Pradesh in Bhadrachalam Temple, which went to Telangana. The Vontimitta Kodandarama Swamy Temple was chosen as the alternative venue of the official celebrations in 2015.

== See also ==
- Bhadrachalam Temple
- List of temples under Tirumala Tirupati Devasthanams
- List of Monuments of National Importance in Andhra Pradesh

== Bibliography ==
- Gurumurthi, Aenuganti (1990). Sculpture and Iconography: Cuddapah District Temples. New Era Publications. ISBN 9789991560182. OCLC 23760017.
- Kamalakar, G. (1 January 2004). Temples of Andhradesa: Art, Architecture & Iconography : with Special Reference to Renandu (Cuddapah) Region. Sharada Publishing House. ISBN 978-81-88934-18-8.
- Michell, George (1 May 2013). Southern India: A Guide to Monuments Sites & Museums. Roli Books Private Limited. ISBN 978-81-7436-903-1.
