= Molla Ramayanam =

16th century Telugu epic poem

- Author: Molla
- Original title: మొల్ల రామాయణము
- Language: Telugu
- Genre: Epic poetry
- Publication date: 16th century
- Publication place: India

Molla Ramayanam is a Telugu epic poem composed by the 16th-century poet Molla, based on the Sanskrit Ramayana by Valmiki. Written in accessible Telugu, this version is notable for its extensive use of kandam-style verse, which led to it also being called "Kanda Ramayanam." Molla's Ramayanam is considered the first condensed Ramayanam in Telugu.

== Authorship and background ==
Molla, whose full name is Atukuri Molla, is the author of this work. A celebrated poet from Gopavaram in the Kadapa district of Andhra Pradesh, she is considered one of the earliest female poets in Telugu literature. Molla identified herself as the daughter of a potter and noted that her father was a devout follower of Siva, a theme that appears in the introductory verses of her work.

== Literary significance ==
Molla was self-taught and claimed her poetic talent was a divine gift. She did not dedicate her work to any king for fame or fortune, a practice uncommon in her time, emphasizing her pure devotion to Rama. She intended her Ramayana to be easily understood by common people, avoiding complex language or grandiosity. Her Ramayanam consists of approximately 870 verses, including a preface, and is divided into six sections (kandas).

The Molla Ramayanam is distinguished by its simplicity and devotional tone, reflecting Molla’s belief that her poetic talent was a divine gift rather than a product of scholarly learning. Although Molla claimed no formal expertise in classical poetry, her familiarity with Sanskrit and Telugu poets is evident in her compositions, where she occasionally praises these earlier poets. According to literary historian Nidadavolu Malathi, Molla’s claims of lacking scholarly knowledge were rooted in humility, a value traditionally upheld in Telugu culture, especially for women writers of the period. The introductory verses of her work suggest that Molla did not undergo formal training from a guru, instead attributing her poetic inspiration to the blessings of Srikantha Malleswara, the deity she revered.

Despite her lack of formal education in the technical aspects of classical poetry, Molla’s verses display a keen understanding of the works of earlier Telugu poets like Nannaya and Tikkana. Her verse structure and style, particularly in her descriptive passages, show influences from the Bhagavatam of Pothana, as seen in her attribution of inspiration to divine sources in a manner similar to Pothana. Molla’s work is known for its simplicity, evident in her choice of words and her avoidance of complex grammatical structures.

== Literary style and influence ==
Written during the era of elaborate and ornate poetic expression, Molla’s Ramayanam stood out for its minimalistic style, using straightforward language without embellishments. While her contemporaries often showcased erudition through long, complex compound words and grandiose descriptions, Molla’s strength lay in conveying profound ideas in short, clear verses. Her style favoured refined simplicity, as seen in descriptions like her portrayal of Rama’s appearance upon arriving in Lanka, using small verses to encapsulate large emotions and imagery.

Molla’s skill in vivid character depictions and settings is often compared to Tikkana. For instance, in describing Hanuman’s leap across the ocean, she creates a visually immersive scene, detailing Hanuman’s intense expression, his firm stance, and the sheer force of his jump, using words that vividly convey the power of the moment:

=== Structure and approach ===
The Molla Ramayanam follows the traditional narrative structure of the Ramayana, beginning with the city of Ayodhya and covering major events like King Dasaratha’s ritual sacrifice and the birth of Rama, leading up to Ravana’s defeat. Molla’s version, however, does not include the Uttara Kanda, focusing solely on the main storyline of Rama’s life.

Molla’s decision to emphasize brevity and clarity in her writing made her Ramayanam accessible to a broad audience, appealing to readers of all backgrounds. Her work remains celebrated in Telugu literature as an enduring example of devotional literature, reflecting regional literary traditions while upholding the spiritual values central to the Ramayana.
