= Eshwaridevi matham =

Eshwaridevi Matham
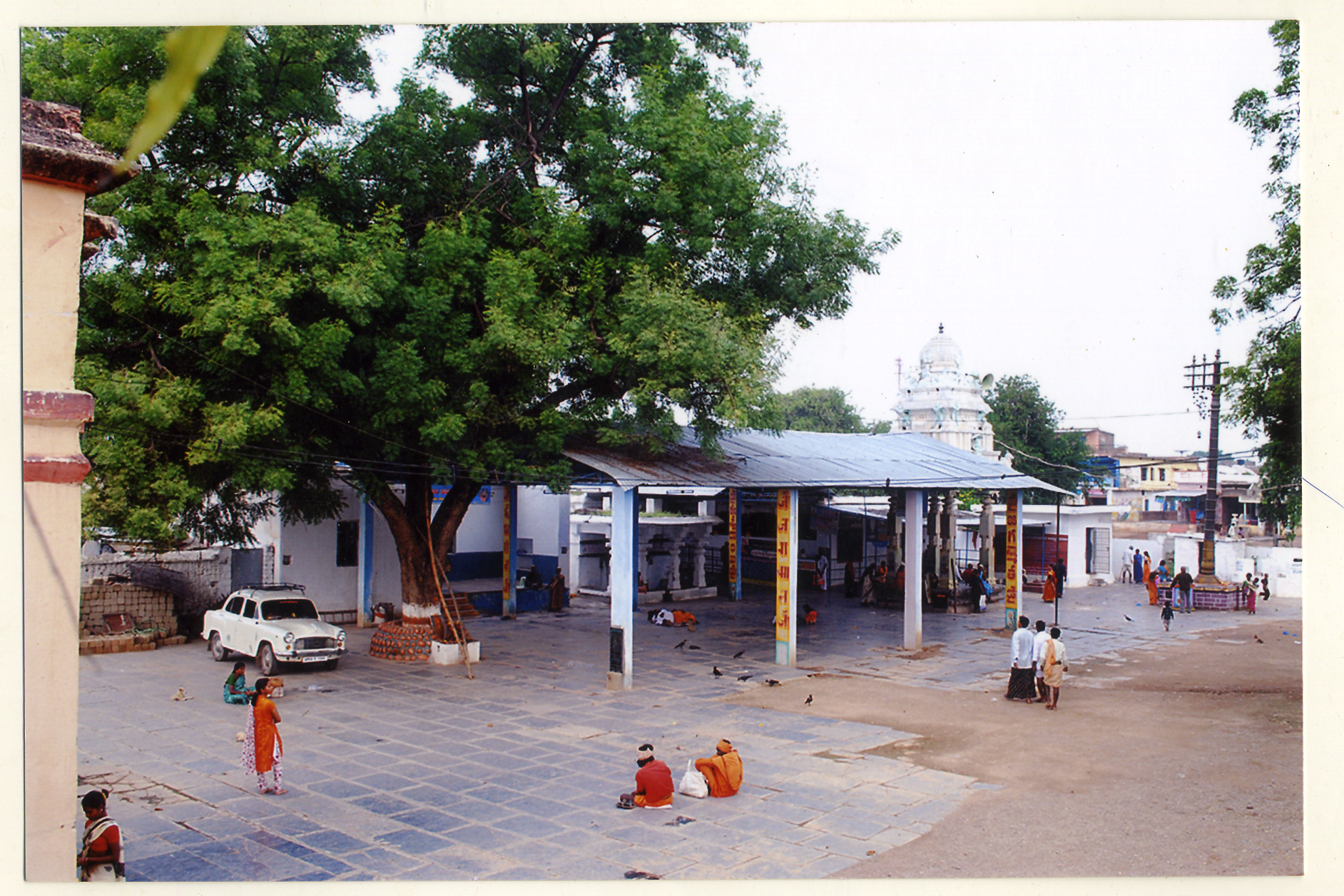

Religion
- Affiliation: Hinduism
- District: Kadapa
- Deity: Jaganmatha Sri Eshwari Maha Devi
- Festivals: Brahmamgari Aradhana, Eshwari Devi Aradhana
- Governing body: Eshwari Devi Matham Management

Location
- Location: Brahmamgari Matham
- State: Andhra Pradesh
- Country: India

Architecture
- Completed: 1791. (probable)

Website
- http://www.kalagnani.com

Eshwari Devi Matham is a famous pilgrimage centre located in Brahmamgari Matham village of Brahmamgari Matam mandal in YSR district in the state of Andhra Pradesh in India. It is the place of Sree Veerabrahmendra Swami sajeeva samadhi, and Sree Eshwari Devi jeeva samadhis are located. Eshwari Devi is the grand daughter of Pothuluri Veerabrahmendra Swamy. Eshwari Devi was the descendant of Govinda swami (elder son of Pothuluri Veerabrahmendra Swamy) and Girimamba. She was the elder daughter of Govinda swami, her siblings being Kashamamba, Kalamamba, Sharavamba, and Shankaramamba.

== Kalagnanam and miracles ==
Like Pothuluri Veerabrahmendra Swamy, she also authored kalagnanam, preaching Veerabrahmendra kalagnanam and advaitha siddantham. The kalagnanam written by Eshwaramma varu can be seen in the villages Kongala Ramapuram and Kona Samudram, and are receiving the daily poojas in the temples. The chief disciples of Eshwari Devi ammavaru were Chatukonda Chengayya Shetty and Yogi Subbayyacharya, and travelled all over India with Ammavaru. She did some miracles like made shaapa vimochanam for the brahma raakshasi at Badvel village, Lightning of lamps with water at Vinukonda Village.
