= Atukuri Molla =

Teluga poet of the 16th century

Molla
- ఆతుకూరి మొల్ల
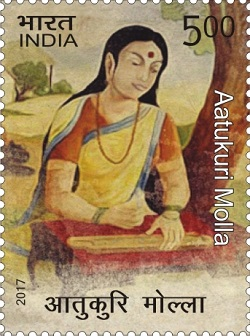
- Born: Atukuri Molla; Gopavaram, in Atmakur Taluq Nellore
- Occupation: Kummara (potter)
- Writing career
- Pen name: Mollamamba
- Language: Telugu
- Period: 16th century
- Genre: Poetry
- Subject: Telugu Ramayanam
- Notable work: Translated the Ramayanam from Sanskrit into Telugu
- Notable awards: 'Kavi Ratna'
- Literary movement: Propagation of Sanatana Dharma

Atukuri Molla (ఆతుకూరి మొల్ల) was a 16th-century Telugu poet who authored Molla Ramayanam, a Telugu-language version of Sanskrit Ramayana. Identified by her caste, she was popularly known as Kummari Molla. Mollamamba or Molla was the daughter of Kesana Setti who was a potter by profession.

While earlier historians placed her as a contemporary of Tikkana Somayaji during the times of Kakatiya empire, Kandukuri Veeresalingam Pantul - in his Andhra Kavula Charitra - suggests that she was a contemporary of Sri Krishna Deva Raya, which seems to cast doubt on earlier claims that she was the sister of Kummara Gurunatha who was the scribe of Tikkana Somayaji in translating Mahabharata. Her salutations to poets like Srinatha who lived in the periods between the Kakatiya and Vijayanagara empires also suggest that they predated her.

== Biography in telugu ==
Molla is the second female Telugu poet of note, after Tallapaka Timmakka, wife of Tallapaka Annamayya ("Annamacharya"). She translated the Sanskrit Ramayana into Telugu.

Her father Atukuri Kesanna was a potter of Gopavaram, a village in Gopavaram Mandal near Atmakur town, fifty miles north of Nellore in Andhra Pradesh state. He was a Lingayat and devotee of Sri Srikantha Malleswara in Srisailam. He gave her daughter the name Molla, meaning "Jasmine", a favourite flower of the god, and also nicknamed her Basavi in respect to Basaveswara. Her parents were great devotees of Siva in his forms as Mallikarjuna and Mallikamba of Srisailam. They were initiated disciples of the Siva Math. Molla was well-known not only in her own village but also in the surrounding hamlets, for her kind hearted nature, generosity and love.

Molla claimed Sri Shiva as Guru, and her inspiration is claimed to have come from Pothanna, who wrote Bhagavata purana in Telugu. Like him, she was Saiva Hindu, but wrote the story of Rama (an incarnation of Vishnu) and also refused to dedicate her Ramayana to any king, a general practice for poets at the time.

According to Varadarajn's book, "Study of Vaishnava Literature", as her popularity spread, she was invited to Sessions court and got an opportunity to recite Ramayana in front of Krishnadevaraya and his poets. She spent her old age at Srisailam in the presence of Sri Srikantha Malleswara.

== Works and style ==
Her work is known as Molla Ramayanam and is still one of the simplest of many Ramayanas written in Telugu.

She primarily used simple Telugu and only used Sanskrit words very rarely. Poets that had written earlier than her like Potana used Sanskrit words freely in their works.

She was humble and paid tribute to the earlier scholars who had written the Ramayana in her book. The opening poem says – "Ramayana had been written many times. Does someone stop taking food because it has been taken every day? So is the story of Rama and one can write, read and love it as many number of times as possible."Additionally, she states that if a work is filled with words that reader cannot understand instantaneously, it would be like a dialogue between a deaf person and a dumb person. In other words, poetry should be intelligible to the reader as he reads along and without referring to dictionaries and/or consulting scholars. According to Molla, poetry should be like honey on the tongue—one should feel it as soon as the honey hits tongue.

She added fictional accounts to original stories and in some instances, removed some portions from the original story. Sanskrit-to-Telugu translation works from earlier poets like Tikkana followed the exact story sequences in the original work. She was contemporary to Srinatha and poets of the Vijayanagara Empire, who created Prabhandas which are known for adding fictions. Several critics have attested to her claim as valid. Her Ramayanam has been quoted as a work filled with native flavor, ease of diction and appealing to ordinary readers.

In the royal court, the eight high class poets wanted to test Molla’s poetic talent in front of the emperor. They asked her to demonstrate her talent by composing two stanzas, in a particular metre on the theme of ‘How the lordly elephant was saved from the grip of the crocodile who was stronger than himself’. This theme is found in the eighth canto of the second chapter of the Bhagavat Purana. And she was given only one minute to think. Molla looked up at the heavens, then closed her eyes, mentally prayed to Sri Rama and in her melodious voice sang the two poems within the prescribed time. All the poets were struck dumb. She had been able to silence all of them.

Then the poets of the royal court not only gave her the title of “Kavi Ratna” but also recommended to the king that he show great honour to this saint and poet.

== Later life ==
Returning to her native village, Molla entrusted her Ramayana, which was already dedicated to Sri Kantha Malleswara, to the temple authorities. As her life's mission was over, she took leave of the deity as also of the village folk and left for Srisailam to spend the rest of her life performing great austerities. During her last days she also spent a great deal of time preaching to those seekers of God who came to her for inspiration and enlightenment. Molla went into Mahasamadhi about A.D. 1530 aged 90. Though Molla's physical body is gone, her life will continue to be a living example for ages to come. The poems Molla composed throughout her life are sung wherever Telugu is spoken, throughout the country. Their simplicity and intense spiritual fervour have made them popular in the past five hundred years.

== Awards and honors ==
- Andhra Pradesh government erected a statue of her on the tankbund in Hyderabad along with few other Great Telugu personalities.
- A fictional account of her life story has been written by Inturi Venkateswara Rao, under the title Kummara Molla, published in 1969
- Based on this novel, another writer Sunkara Satyanarayana wrote a ballad, which became very popular and has been sung all over Andhra Pradesh
- She was used as a symbol of women's advancement by women's associations. On one recent occasion a women's rights protest began at her statue in Hyderabad, in 2006.
- A movie Kathanayika Molla was made about her, with Vanisri playing the lead role.

== See also ==
- Kathanayika Molla, a 1970 Telugu film produced and directed by B. Padmanabham
- Potana, another poet and devotee who translated Bhagavata Purana
- Tikkana, another ancient poet from Nellore
- Timmakka, another ancient women poet in Telugu
