= Gandikota Reservoir =

Irrigation project in Andhra Pradesh, India

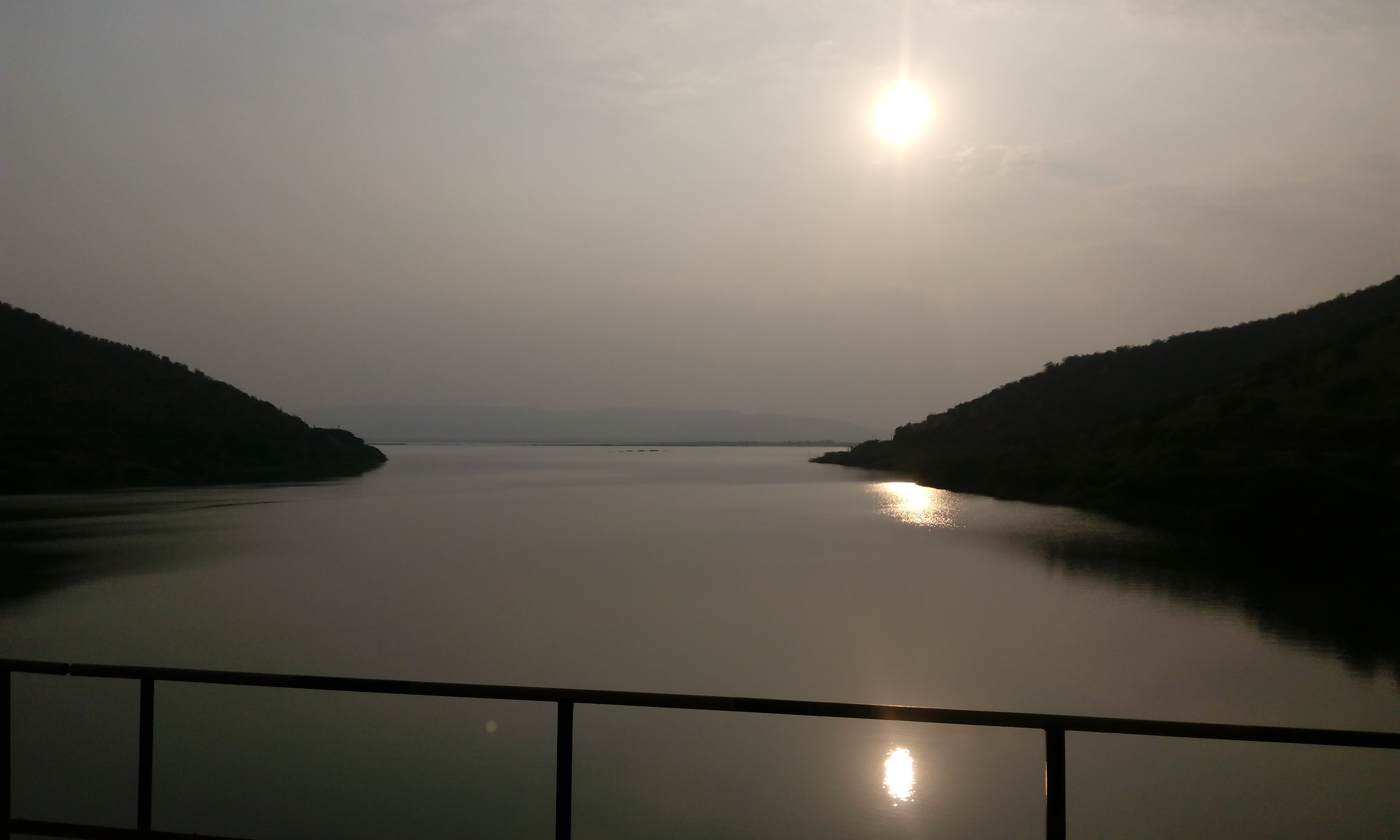
- Evening Scenic view at Gandikota reservoir in Kadapa district

- Location within Andhra Pradesh Location within India
- Interactive map of Gandikota Reservoir
- Location: Kadapa, Andhra Pradesh
- Coordinates: 14.8072°N 78.2306°E
- Type: Reservoir
- Part of: Penna River Basin
- River sources: Penna River
- Basin countries: India
- Built: September 22, 2013
- Water volume: 26.84 billion cu ft (760 Gl)
- Surface elevation: 320 metres (1,050 ft)

Gandikota Reservoir is an irrigation project located across Penna River of Andhra Pradesh in the Indian state. It receives water from Galeru Nagari Sujala Sravanthi Project canal. It is located between Gandikota village and Kondapur village of Kadapa district.

== Details ==
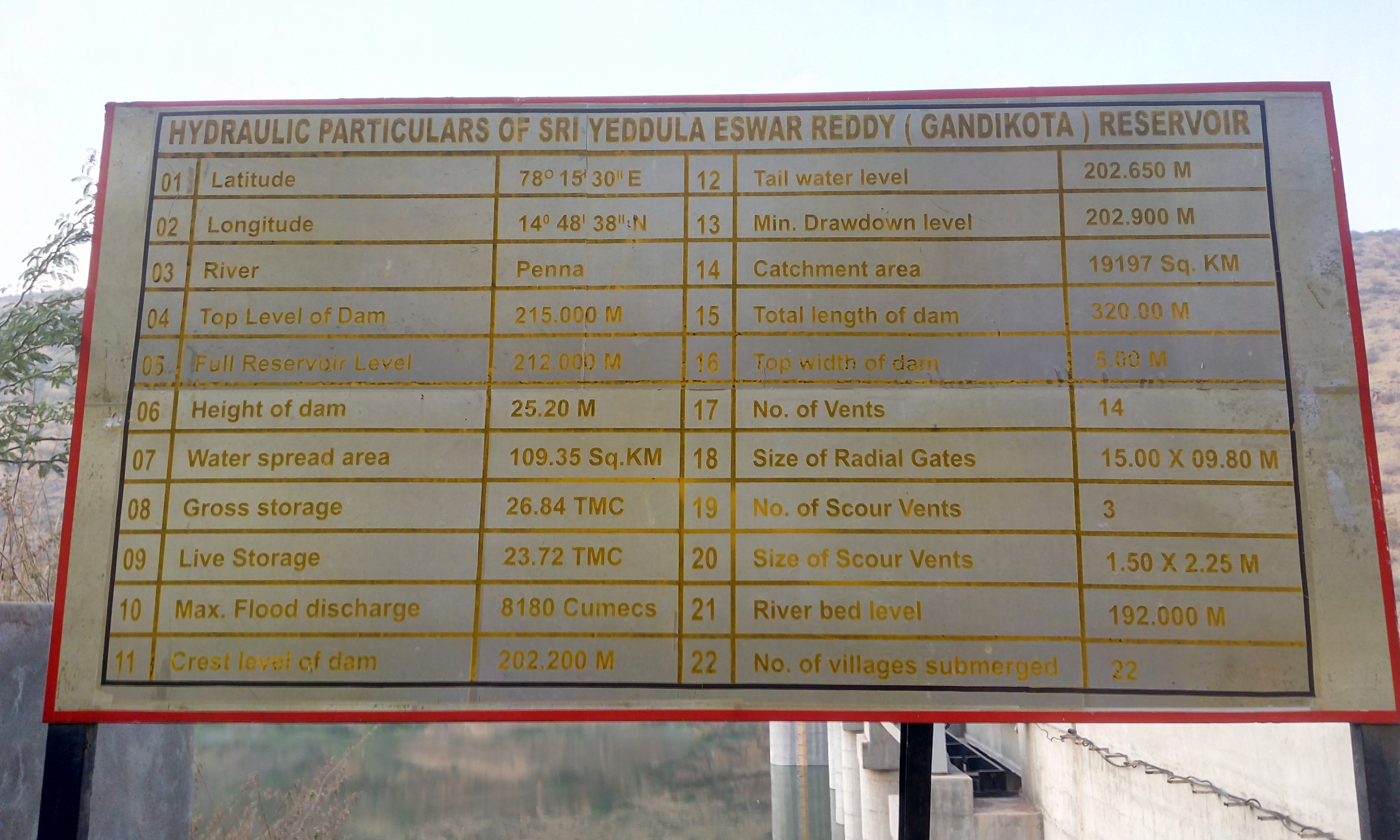
Gandikota Reservoir particulars

This project was started as a part of Jalayagnam program. It was inaugurated on 22 September 2013. The reservoir, with gross storage capacity of 26.84 billion cu ft (760 Gl), is located in Penna River Basin. This reservoir act as a Balancing reservoir to supply Krishna River water into Penna River basin in Kadapa district, Nellore district and Chittoor district.

== Irrigation ==
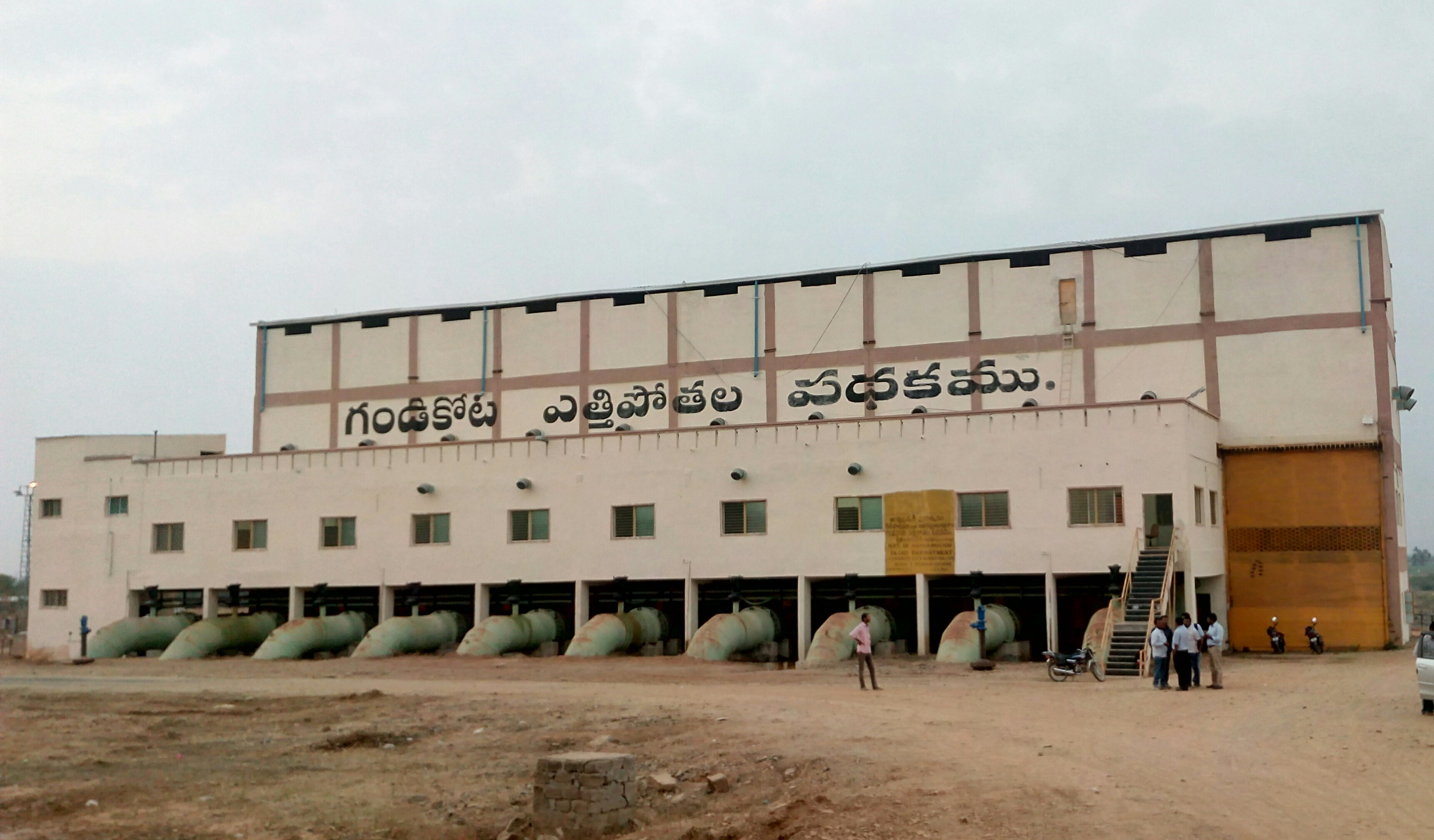
Gandikota lift irrigation Pump House

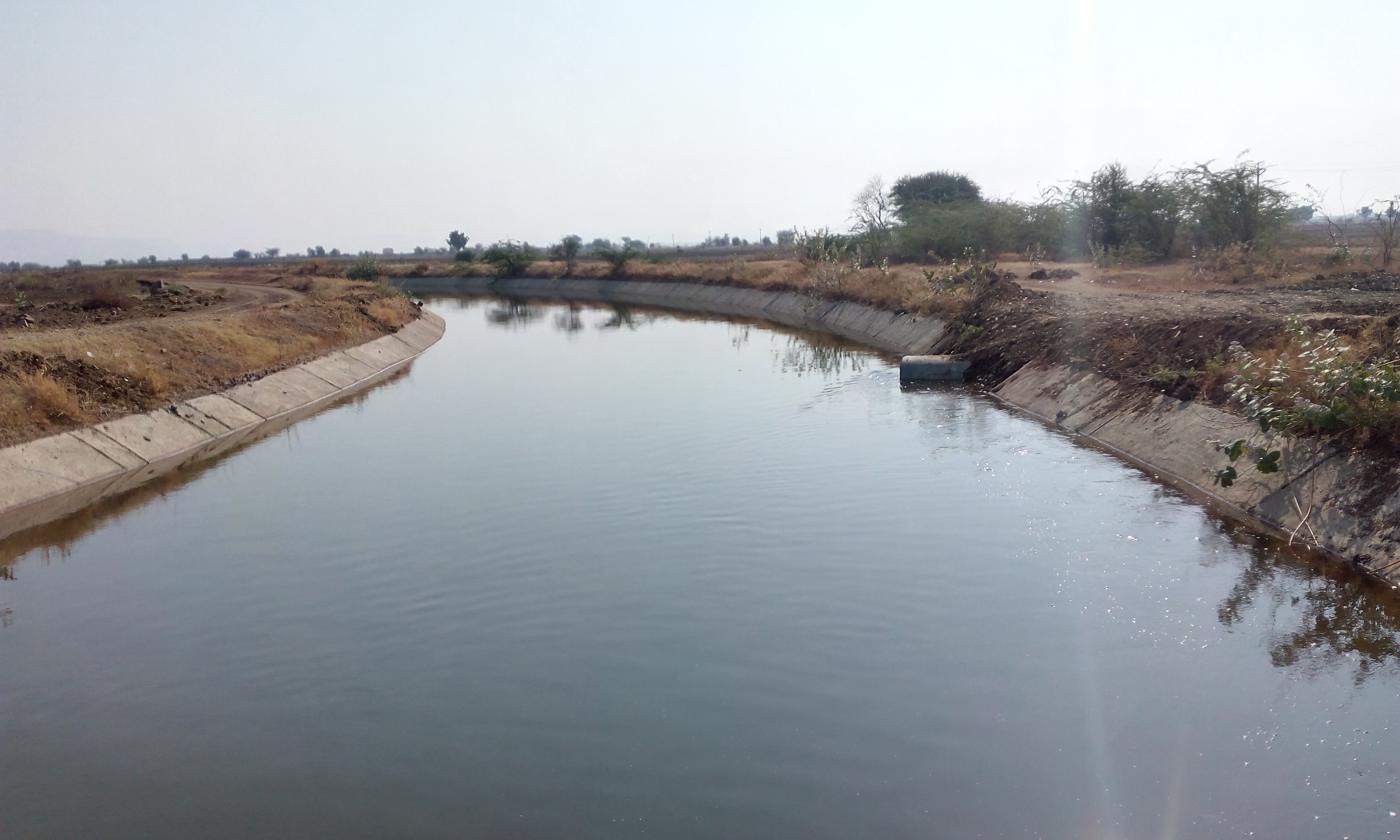
Gandikota lift canal near Simhadri Puram

Gandikota lift irrigation scheme is also a part of this reservoir. There are two stages in this scheme. The first stage is to supply water to Pulivendula Branch canal and the second stage is to supply water into Chitravati Balancing reservoir.

== Displacement of people ==
The project has displaced around 43,200 people across several villages. Thousands were rendered homeless owing to the submergence of their villages and others have been demanding compensation for their lands. In December 2020, the Andhra Pradesh High Court dismissed a PIL seeking a stay on evictions.
