= Kalagnanam =

Book by Potuluri Veerabrahmam

- Author: Potuluri Veerabrahmam
- Language: Telugu
- Subject: Prophecy
- Publication place: India
- English publication date: 11 June 2019

Kalagnanam is a Telugu language book by 16th-century Indian saint Potuluri Veerabrahmam about the past, present, and the prediction of future.

The text precedes Veerabrahmam and has many other authors, who prophesied the future of their times. The first among them being Sri Yogi Narayana (Kaiwara Thatha) who was a bangle seller who became great saint with blessings of lord Amara Narayana Swamy and wrote the Kalagnana. Other saints who contributed to the Kalagnanam include Eswaridevi (the grand daughter of Veerabrahmam), Yogi Subbaraya Sharma, Swami Madhavacharya (also called Vidyaranya, the minister of Harihara I) and Dudekula Siddaiah (the disciple of Veerabrahmam).

A brief part of Kalagnanam written by Veerabrahmam, which was kept in his native place was published in Telugu as a book by Brahmamgari Matham in 1970 for the first time, along with other works of the saint. The remaining three parts of Kalagnanam are said to be kept under the tamarind tree in Achamaamba temple or Achamaamba home in Banaganapalle village of Kurnool district of Andhra Pradesh. Out of the brief part of Kalagnanam by Veerabrahmam, 320 verses or poems are very popular under the name "Govinda Vakyas".

Prophecies by many saints from South India are included in the Kalagnanam book. Most prophecies in the Kalagnanam, describe the coming king-cum-avatar, Veera Bhoga Vasanta Rayalu and his acts. About 70 percent of the prophecies speak of him, while other parts describe future events mainly in South India. Another saint, Sarvajna had prophesied during the rule of Bijjalaraya the emergence of Veera Bhoga Vasanta Rayalu in his poetry collection Dwipada.
