= Vontimitta =

Vontimitta ఒంటిమిట్ట
- Temple Town
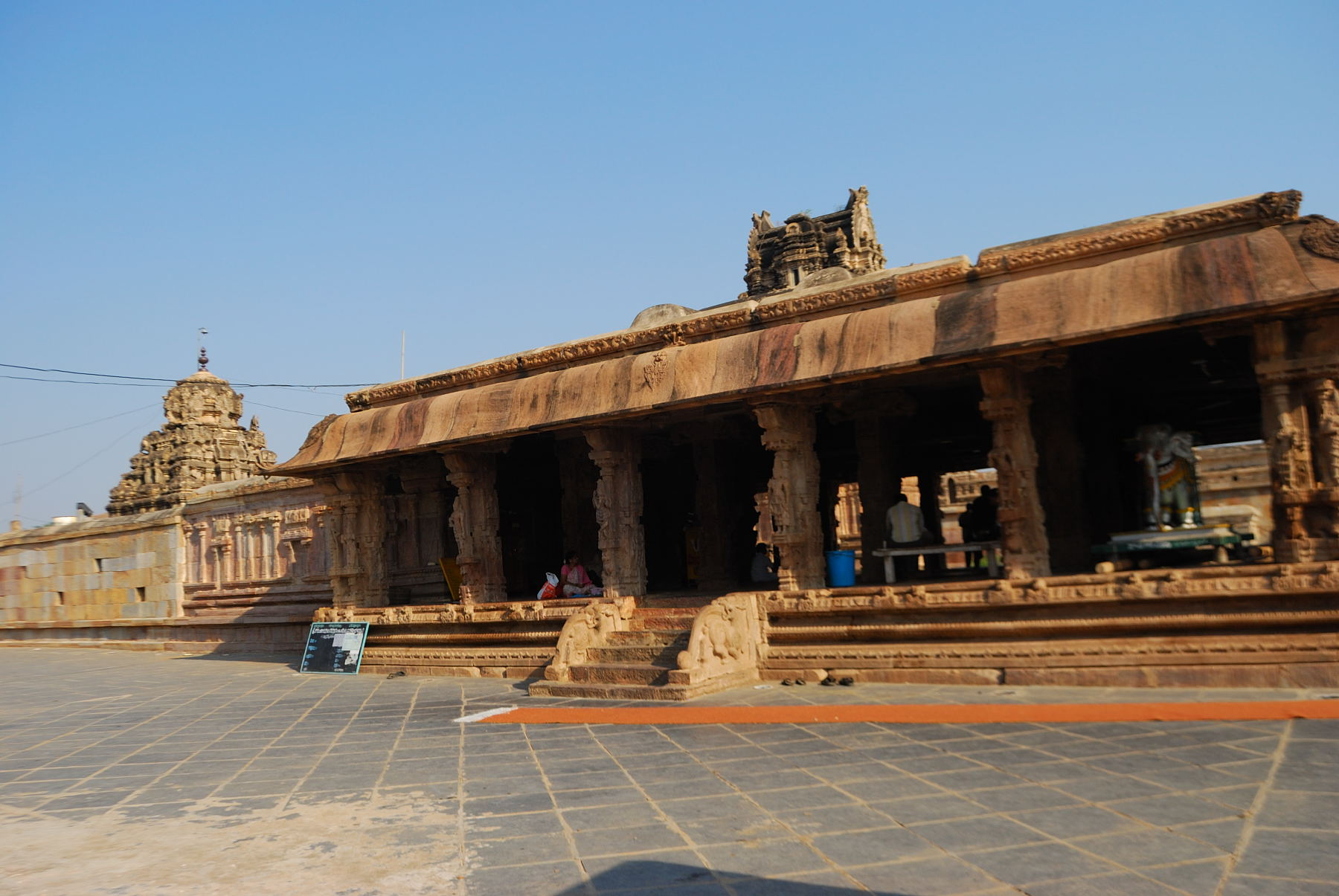
- View of the Sri Kodandarama Swamy Temple in Vontimitta
- Interactive map of Vontimitta
- Location in Andhra Pradesh, India
- Coordinates: 14.3833°N 79.0333°E
- Country: India
- State: Andhra Pradesh
- District: Kadapa

Area
  - Total: 19.64 km^{2} (7.58 sq mi)

Population (2011)
  - Total: 16,067
  - Density: 818.1/km^{2} (2,119/sq mi)

Languages
- Time zone: UTC+5:30 (IST)
- PIN: 516213
- Telephone code: 08589
- Vehicle registration: AP-04

Vontimitta (Telugu: ఒంటిమిట్ట) or Ekasilanagaram, is a village in Kadapa district of the Indian state of Andhra Pradesh. It is located in Vontimitta mandal of the Kadapa revenue division.

The village is well-known for the Kodandarama Swamy Temple, Vontimitta, famous for its architecture and art. French traveler Jean-Baptiste Tavernier described the temple as ,“one of the grandest pagodas in the whole of India”. The temple is considered to be a centrally protected monument.

== Etymology ==
The name of the village Vontimitta is said to be derived from the names of two persons Vontudu and Mittudu. These two helped a king named Kampana, who camped with his army at this place, by showing the water of Ramatirtham to quench the king and his fellowmen’s thirst. Then the king pleased at them and built a village after their names. King Kampana may be the Kumara Kampana, son of king Bukka Raya I. Vontudu –Mittudu later became "Vontimitta". Kampana also built a temple of Rama here.

Another version is that the village is called Ekasilanagaram (lit. City of one stone) because the idols of Rama, Sita and Lakshmana are carved out of a single stone with a common pedestal.

The village is situated on a risen ground by the side of a small hill. The village might've got its name from the hill which in Telugu is Vontimitta. (vonti translates to single and mitta to hill).

== Geography ==
Vontimitta is located at 14.3833°N 79.0333°E. It has an average elevation of 151 meters (498 feet).

== See also ==
Kodandarama Temple, Vontimitta
