= Potuluri Veerabrahmam =

Indian Hindu saint

Pōthulūri Vīrabrahmēndrasvāmi పోతులూరి వీరబ్రహ్మేంద్రస్వామి
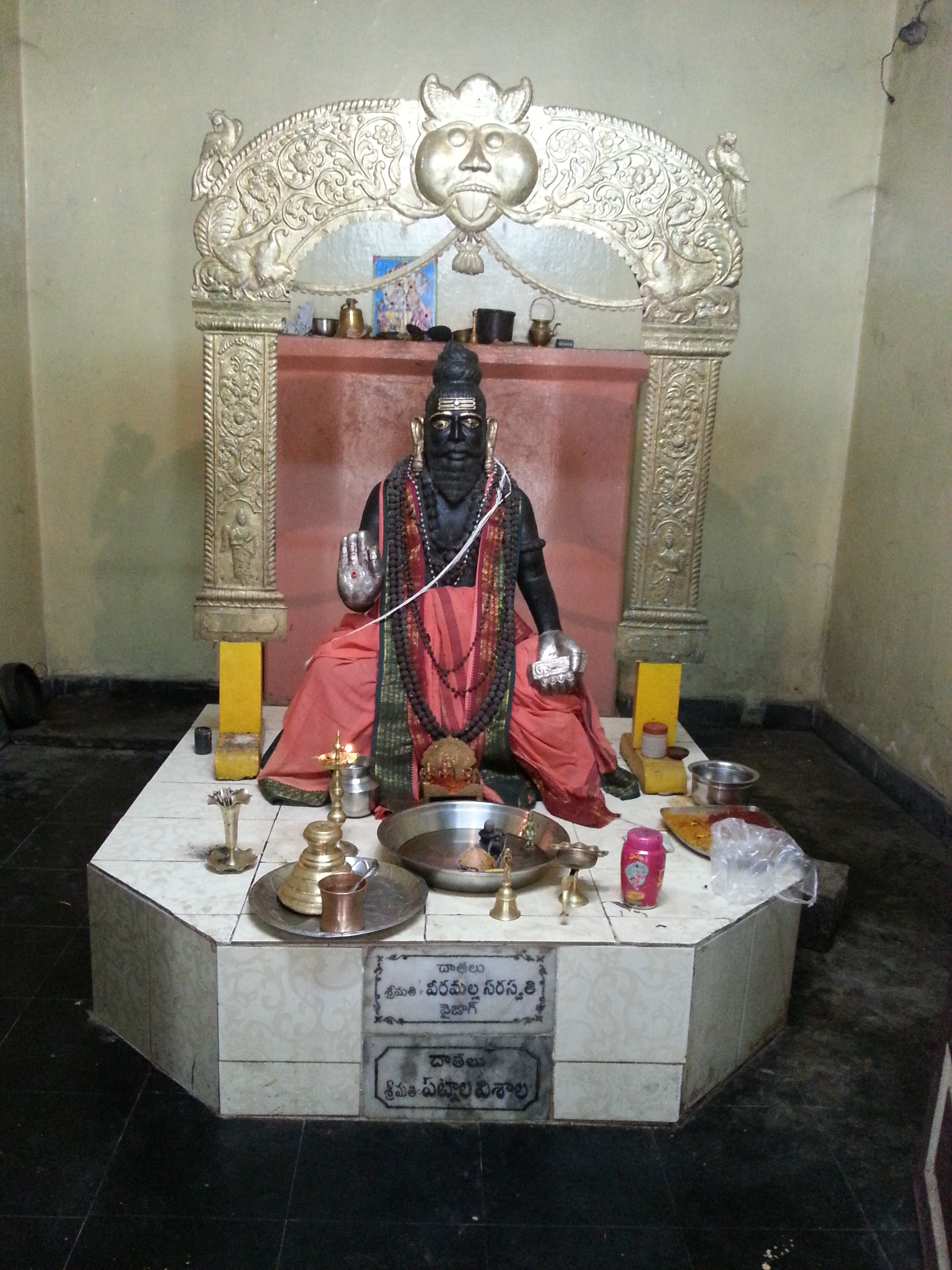
- An idol of Potuluri Veerabrahmam in Vizianagaram

Personal life
- Born: (lived 16th century) Penance In Samadhi
- Notable work: prophecy called Kalagnanam
- Honors: Sri Madhviraat

Religious life
- Religion: Hinduism

Potuluri Veerabrahmam (Telugu: పోతులూరి వీరబ్రహ్మేంద్రస్వామి, romanized: Pōtulūri Vīrabrahmēndrasvāmi, also known as Brahmamgaru), was a Hindu saint who lived in Andhra Pradesh. He is known for the Kalagnanam, a book of predictions written in Telugu around the 16th century.

== Legendary account ==
According to a legend, Veerabrahmendra swamy was born to a Vishwabrahmana couple, Paripurnayacharya and Prakruthamba, near the river Sarasvati River in Brahmandapuram. The couple abandoned him at birth and Veerambrahmam was brought up at Atri Mahamuni ashram near Varanasi. Later Veerabhojayacharya, Head of the Papagni Mutt, Chikballapur, Karnataka, was on a pilgrimage with his wife. The couple visited the Sage Atri ashram, and sage Atri gave the child to the couple. They received the child as a divine gift and returned to Papagni Mutt. The child was named 'Veeram Bhotlaiah'.

Veerabrahmendra Swamy, then known as the Veeram Bhotlaiah at Papagni Mutt authored the Kalikamba Sapthashathi (the manuscript written in praise of goddess Kali) at the age of 11. A few days later, Veerabhojayacharya made a sacrifice and Veeram Bhotlaiah told his stepmother that he had refused to take homage responsibilities and started his spiritual journey. His first disciple was Dudekula Siddaiah his second disciple was Kakaiah Madiga and Brahmana annajaya, People started listening to Veeram Bhotlaiah's chanting and philosophical poems, and as a sign of respect they called him 'Sri Madvirat Pothuluri Veera Brahmendra Swami'.

Veerabrahmendra Swamy attained Jiva Samadhi at Brahmam gari Matam, Kadapa District on Kartika Shudda Dwadasi.

== Legacy ==
- Brahmamgari matam in Kadapa district is a pilgrimage center in Andhra Pradesh.
- Editor T Ganapati Sastri of the book BrahmaTatwa Prakasika of Sadasivendra Saraswati (Trivandrum Sanskrit Series No VII), published in 1909, makes passing mention of a Tamil work called Acharya-Darpana that supposedly details his deeds.
- Srimadvirat Veerabrahmendra Swami Charitra is a 1984 film about his life. The Late Chief Minister of Andhra Pradesh N. T. Rama Rao acted and directed the film, which became a hit in Andhra Pradesh.
