= Tallapaka Tirumalamma =

15th century Indian poet in Telugu

Tallapaka Tirumalamma or Timmakka (15th century) was a Telugu poet who wrote Subhadra Kalyanam in Telugu. She was wife of singer-poet Annamacharya and was popularly known as Timmakka.

== Biography ==
Timmakka was born into a Niyogi Brahmin family. She is considered as the first Telugu woman poet.

Timmakka's main work, Subhadra Kalyanam with 1170 poems, is about the marriage of Arjuna and Subhadra, characters in Hindu epic Mahabharata. She presented the Telugu nativity and culture in the story taken from Sanskrit epic.

== See also ==
- Molla, another early female poet in Telugu
