= Pothana =

Indian Telugu poet

- Born: 1400; Bammera Village, Janagama Dist, Telangana, India
- Died: 1475 (aged 74–75)
- Occupations: Poet and farmer
- Writing career
- Genre: Religion

Bammera Pothana (1400–1475) was a Telugu poet best known for his translation of the Srimad Bhaagavatam from Sanskrit to Telugu. He was a Telugu and Sanskrit Scholar. His work, Srimad Bhagavatamu, is popularly called as Pothana Bhagavatam in Telugu.

== Early life ==
Pothana was born into a Niyogi Brahmin family at Bammera Village in Jangaon District of Telangana. His father was Kesana and his mother Lakkamamba. He was considered to be a 'Sahaja Kavi' (natural poet), needing no teacher. As a child, Pothana was deeply devoted to Lord Rama, this devotion strongly influenced all his literary work in later years. He is best known for composing the Andhra Mahabhagavatamu, a Telugu translation of the Sanskrit Bhagavata Purana. He was known to be very polite and was an agriculturist by occupation. Though he was a great scholar, he never hesitated to work in the agricultural fields. Pothana is famously believed to have spent much of his life in his native Telangana region, away from the major royal courts of his time. His family background and surroundings had exposed him to both traditional learning and the agricultural way of life.

== Literary career ==
At an early age he wrote Bhogini Dhandakam, a poem written in the praise of king Sri Singa Bhoopala's concubine Bhogini. This was his first poetic venture which had the seeds of his great poetic talents. Bhogini Dhandakam is the earliest available Dhandaka (rhapsody which uses the same gana or foot all through) in Telugu. His second work was Virabhadhra Vijayamu which describes the adventures of Lord Virabhadhra, element of Lord Shiva. The main theme was the destruction of 'Daksha Yagna' performed in the absence of Lord Siva by Daksha Prajapathi.

As a young man, he was a devotee of Lord Siva. Later, Pothana became a devotee of Lord Rama and more interested in salvation. In the view of Pothana, there is no difference between Siva and Vishnu and the same was reflected in his padyam "ChethuLAranga Sivuni Poojimpadeni Nooru Novvanga hari keerthi salupadeeni dhayanu satyamulonuga thalupadeni kaluganetiki thallula kadupuchetu". One early morning during a lunar eclipse, on the banks of river Godavari, Pothana was meditating on Lord Siva. At that auspicious moment, Supreme Lord Rama appeared dressed like a king and requested Pothana to translate Bhagavatam into Telugu (Andhramu) and dedicate it to Him. This inspired him to translate Vyasa's Sanskrit Bhagavatam into Telugu as Sri Andhra Maha Bhaagavatamu.

=== Persecution ===
The Padma Nayaka king of Rachakonda (in present-day Nalgonda District) wanted Pothana to dedicate ‘Sri Maha Bhagavatam’ to him. The king himself is a scholar and wrote many works including Rudranavasudhakara, a well known Sanskrit drama. But, Pothana refused to obey the king's orders and dedicated the Bhagavatamu to Lord Rama, whom he worshiped with great devotion. It is said that Pothana remarked, ‘It is better to dedicate the work to the supreme Lord Vishnu than dedicate it to the mortal kings.’ He was of opinion that poetry was a divine gift and it should be utilized for salvation by devoting it to the God. It is known that Pothana was patronized by this king in his early career, Pothana dedicated his first great work to this king, the king himself was a scholar, his contemporary reputation was immense. It was common practice for many poets of the time to dedicate their devotional works to God himself and not necessarily to their patron-kings. The poem containing the derision against the "Karanata Kiraata Keechakulu" is a chatuvu (apocryphal) attributed to Pothana with no proof that he actually wrote it. Even if he did, it is unclear who the Karanata villains were, very likely the rulers of Karnaata Samrajyam (the contemporary term for the Vijayanagara empire) who were raiding Rachakonda at the time. The Rachakonda kingdom was under intense turmoil at the time, under attack by the Bahamanis from the west, Karanata (Vijayanagara) empire from the south and the Reddy Kingdom from the east. Rachakonda and its king ceased to exist by the mid-15th century, absorbed into the Bahmani kingdom. There is yet another version about his birthplace. He indicated in one stanza that he belonged to 'Ekasila Nagaram', meaning single stone city which was also called as Orukallu later changed to Orugallu (Warangal) in usage, Orukallu meaning single stone.Oru means one ( in Tamil) and Kallu means stone.

=== Style ===
He was quite fond of using rhythm and repetition of sounds giving a majestic grace to the style of writing. He was very skillful in using Alankaras (figures of speech) like similes and metaphors. Pothana imparted the knowledge of the divine to the Telugu people along with lessons in ethics and politics through Sri Maha Bhagavatamu. He lived for sixty years.

== Significance ==
Even people with little knowledge in Telugu can readily quote verses from chapters 'Gajendra Mokshamu' and 'Prahlada Charitra of his work, ‘Sri Maha Bhagavatamu,’ the crown jewel of Telugu literature.

== God's writing ==
ala vaikuMThapuraMbulO nagarilo nAmUla soudhaMbu dApala......

This is a verse which describes the palace of Lord Vishnu in his divine abode (VAIKUNTHA), at the time the elephant king prayed for the Lord's kindness to deliver him out of the deadly grip of crocodile in a lake.

The story goes that Pothana wrote the first line of the verse, but could not continue (because he did not know how vaikuntha looks!). So he paused the writing at that point, and went to farm (he was a cultivator by profession). When he came back in the evening, he saw the verse completed.

He enquired his daughter about who wrote the other three lines. The daughter replied – "You yourself came in the afternoon and wrote some thing!". So Pothana understood that Lord Sri Rama himself came and completed the verse.

In fact, Pothana himself ascribed in the following poem, the purpose of his writing the Bhagavatam:

పలికెడిది భాగవతమట
పలికించెడి వాడు రామభధృండట నే
పలికిన భవహర మగునట
పలికెద వేరొండు గాథ పలుకగనేల

PalikeDidhi Bhagavatamata
Palikinchedivadu Ramabhadrundata Ne
Palikina Bhavaharamagunata
PalikedaVerondu Gaatha PalukagaNela

Translated it means : "That which is spoken is the Bhagavatam and the one who made me speak/chant this is Lord Rama. The result of chanting this (Bhagavatamata) is ultimate freedom, the Liberation of soul. So, let me sing it, since there is no other story better than this (Bhagavatam)."

== Sample verses ==
This verse is Prahlada's reply to his father asking him to give up glorifying the One he hated bitterly, Sri Hari.

మందార మకరంద మాధుర్యమునఁ దేలు మధుపంబు వోవునే మదనములకు
నిర్మల మందాకినీ వీచికలఁ దూఁగు రాయంచ సనునె తరంగిణులకు
లలిత రసాలపల్లవ ఖాది యై చొక్కు కోయిల సేరునే కుటజములకు
బూర్ణేందు చంద్రికా స్ఫురిత చకోరక మరుగునే సాంద్ర నీహారములకు

అంబుజోదర దివ్య పాదారవింద
చింతనామృత పానవిశేష మత్త
చిత్త మేరీతి నితరంబు జేరనేర్చు
వినుతగుణశీల! మాటలు వేయునేల?

Approximate translation:

A honeybee reveling in the honey-sweetness of Hibiscus, would he seek grass flowers?
A royal swan swaying in the pure breezes of the Ganges, would he go to waves of rivers?
A nightingale relishing the juices of smooth young leaflets, will he approach rough leaves?
A chakora bird blossoming in the moonlight of a full moon, would he ever seek places with darkness and thick fog?

Minds attention on the lotus-wearer's (God's) divine lotus-feet, a heightened headiness brought on by that nectar-like contemplation
In what way will it learn to seek another? Listen good one, what is the point of discussing (it's obvious)?

Following is the first verse in his Sri Maha Bhagavatam- The book that explains the nature of the God.

This is the beginning Verse of SriMahabhagavatamu

శ్రీకైవల్య పదంబు జేరుటకునై చింతించదన్ లోకర
క్షైకారంభకు భక్తపాలన కళా సంరంభకున్ దానవో
ద్రేకస్థంభకు కేళిలోల విలసద్ద్రుగ్జాల సంభూత నా
నాకంజాత భవాండకుంభకు మహా నందాంగనా డింభకున్

Approximate translation:

I pray for kaivalya (proximity to god) which is the ultimate wealth, to the God (Krishna),
the one who saves all the universe,
the one who has lot of skill or art in taking care of his devotees,
the one who destroys the anger of the evil people (Daanava),
the one who creates all the universes just by his playful sight,
the one who is the son of (Yasoda) wife of Nanda.

Another verse of Pothana

చేతులారంగ శివుని పూజింపడేని
నోరునోవ్వంగ హరి కీర్తి నుడువడేని
దయను సత్యము లోనుగా తలుప డేని
కలుగ నేటికీ తల్లుల కడుపుచేటు.

Approximation translation in English

Persons who do not Worship Lord Shiva with their hands,
praise Lord Vishnu with their Mouth,
do not have Mercy and do not talks truth,
have no meaning to their birth and vow bad name to their mothers.

ఎవ్వనిచే జనించు జగమెవ్వని లోపల నుండు లీనమై ఎవ్వడియందుడిందుపరమేశ్వరుడెవ్వడు మూలకారణం బెవ్వడనాదిమధ్యలయుడెవ్వడు సర్వముతానైనవా డెవ్వడు వానినాత్మభవు ఈశ్వరునినే శరణంబువేడెదన్

Potana was unique. While other great poets started their works with prayers for God for the welfare of society "లోకకళ్యాణము" or fulfillment of their desires"ఆభీష్టసిద్ధి", Potana asked for deliverance from the cycles of birth and death. "శ్రీకైవల్యపదంబుజేరుటకునై చింతించెదన్." Elsewhere, he stated that the main purpose of human life is not to have another life. "మజ్జననంబున్ సఫలంబుజేసెద పునర్జన్మంబులేకుండగన్."

There is no way to simplify the brilliance of Potana. One has to read and read Bhagavatamu. But Here are a couple of examples of Potana's brilliance. To achieve a desired result, total absorption in what humans do is necessary, including transcendance, like Prahlada's absorption in Narayana.

పానీయంబులుతాగుచున్ కుడుచుచున్ భాషించుచున్ హాస లీ లానిద్రాదులుజేయుచున్ తిరుగుచున్ భాషించుచున్ సంతత శ్రీనారాయణపాదపద్మయుగళీ చింతామృతాస్వాదసం ధానుండైమరచెన్ సురారిసుతుడేతద్విశ్వమున్ భూవరా

The dwarf, వామన, suggested contentment and to be happy.

వ్యాప్తింబొందకవగవక ప్రాప్తంబగు లేశమైన పదివేలనుచున్ తృప్తింజెందనిమనుజుడు సప్తద్వీపములనైన జక్కంబడునే
