= Power sector in Andhra Pradesh =

Power sector of Andhra Pradesh is divided into 4 categories namely Regulation, Generation, Transmission and Distribution. Andhra Pradesh Electricity Regulatory Commission (APERC) is the regulatory body. APGENCO deals with the electricity production and also maintenance, proposes new projects and upgrades existing ones as well. The APGENCO also set up a Special Purpose Vehicle (SPV), named as Andhra Pradesh Power Development Company Limited (APPDCL), a joint venture company of APGENCO (with 50% equity) and IL&FS (50% equity) to set up Krishnapatanam thermal power project (2x800 MW).

APTRANSCO is set up for transmission of power. APGENCO, APPDCL, NTPC and other private firms contribute to the generation of power in the state of Andhra Pradesh. Andhra Pradesh has become the second state in India to achieve 100% electrification of all households. Weighted average cost of power generation and purchases is INR 3.45 per kWh which is highest in the country. Andhra Pradesh is also leader by installing 433 nos electric vehicle charging stations (EVCS) out of 927 nos installed in the entire country as on 30 June 2020.

Under the program of installing 500 GW capacity of renewable power capacity by 2030, nearly 59 GW (25%) of solar and wind power is identified out of 236.58 GW in three districts of the state.

The newly formed Andhra Pradesh Green Energy Corporation Limited (APGECL), a 100% subsidiary of APGENCO, will be the trading agency/licensee for the 10 GW solar project in a phased manner and for connecting it to the grid. The 10 GW solar projects would be used to meet the entire agriculture power consumption which will be met during the day time for nine hours duration daily. Andhra Pradesh is also leading in installation of solar power /off grid agriculture pump sets. A renewable energy export policy for Andhra Pradesh was also announced to facilitate the setting up of 120 GW solar, wind and solar-wind hybrid energy parks by using 0.5 million acres of land. New & Renewable Energy Development Corporation of Andhra Pradesh (NREDCAP), a state owned company, is actively involved in promoting renewable energy projects in the state. Roof top solar power cost/unit in the state are falling below the domestic power tariff.

The total installed utility power generation capacity is nearly 24,854 MW in the state as of 31 March 2020 APtransCo has made long term power purchase agreements for 19,068 MW as of 31 March 2019. The per capita electricity consumption is 1234 units with 63,143 million KWh gross electricity supplied in the year 2018–19. The performance of Krishnapatanam thermal power station (2X800 MW) with super critical pressure technology is not satisfactory even after one year commercial operation as the units rarely operate at rated capacity forcing the state to purchase costly power from day ahead trading in IEX.

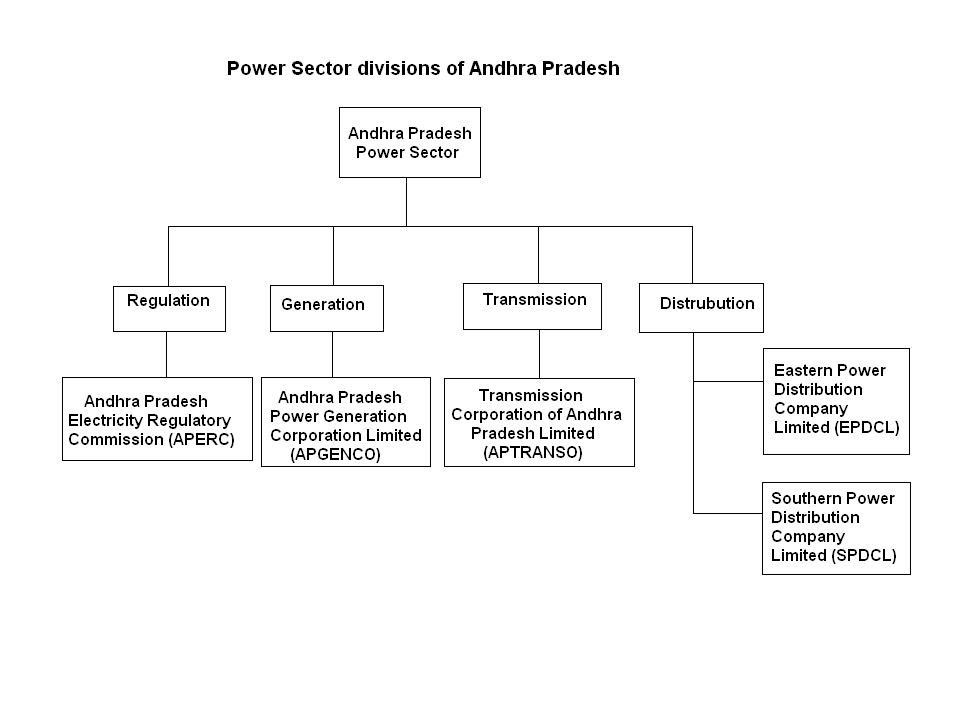
Power sector of Andhra Pradesh flow chart

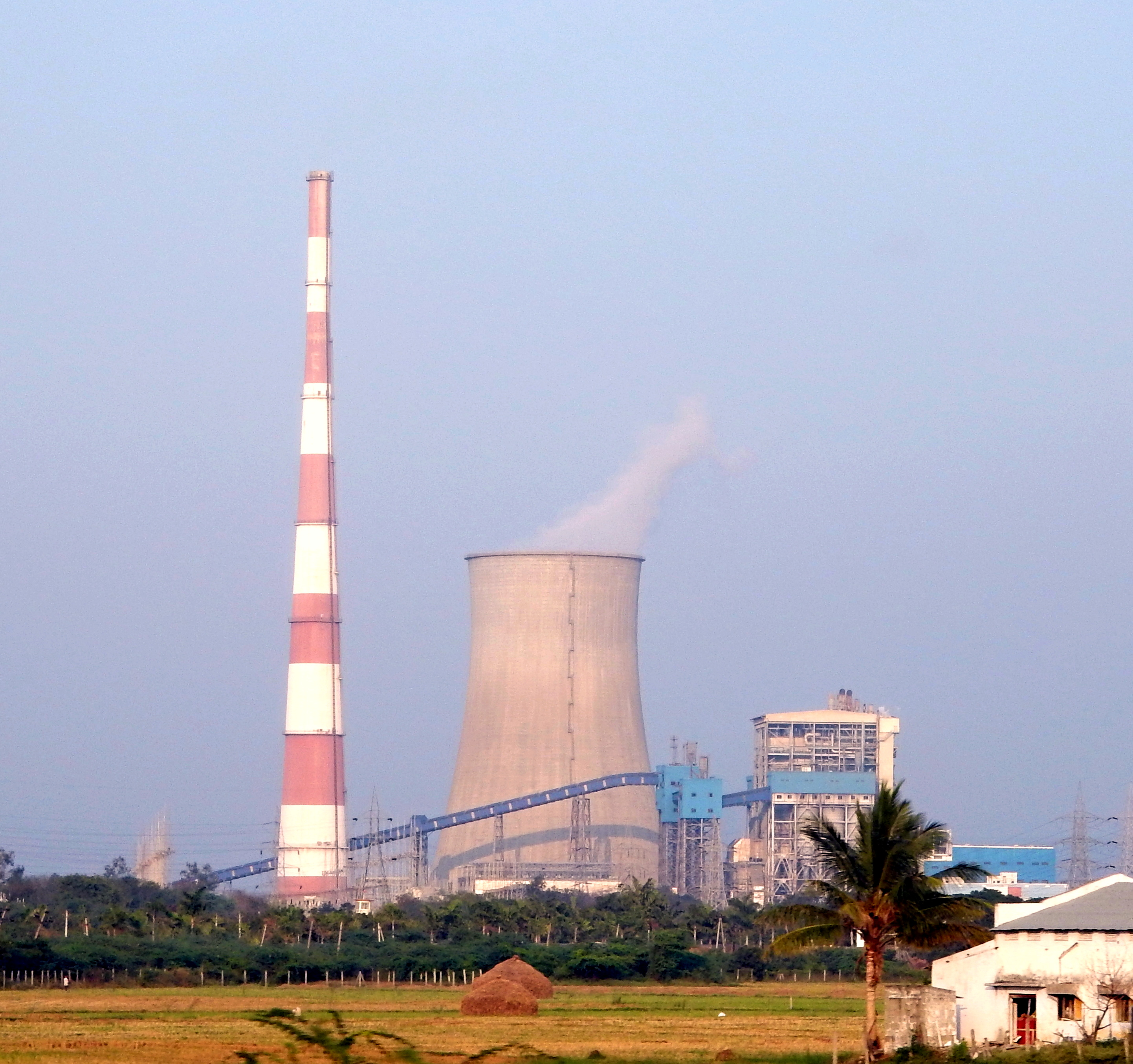
Dr Narla Tata Rao Thermal Power Station (500 MW Unit)

== Short term power purchases ==
APDisComs purchase regularly from the energy exchange, etc. to meet the peak load and energy shortages. As the power purchases/sales are done on daily basis without proper planning and optimum utilization of APGENCO power generation capacity, APERC has given guidelines to the DisComs for implementation while making short term (less than one year duration) purchases and sales in the year 2022.

== Non-renewable ==
=== Thermal power ===
Map of coal-based thermal power plants in the Indian state of Andhra Pradesh. Blue are operational and red are proposed.

Thermal power plants are based on the fuel coal, gas, diesel etc. Public sector undertaking NTPC, state level power generating companies and private firms are engaged in this sector for power generation.

Currently operating coal based thermal power plants in Andhra Pradesh are listed below.

Name	Operator	Location	District	Sector	Capacity (MW)	Coordinates
Simhadri Super Thermal Power Plant	NTPC	Parawada	Anakapalli	Central	2,000	17°35′38″N 83°5′23″E
Dr Narla Tatarao Thermal Power Station	APGENCO	Vijayawada	NTR	State	2,560	16°35′58″N 80°32′12″E
Rayalaseema Thermal Power Station	APGENCO	Muddanur	Kadapa	State	1,650	14°42′14″N 78°27′29″E
Sri Damodaram Sanjeevaiah Thermal Power Station	APPDCL	Krishnapatnam	Nellore	Joint	2,400	14°19′39″N 80°07′15″E
Vizag Thermal Power Station	Hinduja	Gajuwaka	Visakhapatnam	Private	1,040	17°33′45″N 83°8′15″E
Simhapuri Thermal Power Station	SEPL	Krishnapatnam	Nellore	Private	600	14°12′35″N 80°05′23″E
Meenakshi Thermal Power Station	MEPL	Krishnapatnam	Nellore	Private	1,000	14°12′57″N 80°05′19″E
Sembcorp Energy India Limited	SEIL	Krishnapatnam	Nellore	Private	1,320	14°19′45″N 80°08′27″E
SGPL Power Station	SGPL	Krishnapatnam	Nellore	Private	1,320	14°21′5″N 80°08′37″E
TOTAL					13,890	

=== Gas fuel-based ===
Map of currently operating combined-cycle gas-turbine power plants in the Indian state of Andhra Pradesh

The following are the list of presently installed combined cycle gas turbine power plants and diesel engine power plants in the state. However many of these power plants are not operating due to non-availability of natural gas and high cost of liquid fuels.

Power station	Operator	Location	District	Sector	Capacity (MW)	Plant Coordinates
APGPCL Plant	APGPCL	Vijjeswaram	W. Godavari	Joint	272	16°56′02″N 81°43′27″E
Lanco Kondapalli Power Plant	Lanco Infratech	Kondapalli	NTR	Private	1466	16°38′20″N 80°33′00″E
Gautami Combined Cycle Power Plant	GVK	Peddapuram	Kakinada	Private	464	17°02′21″N 82°08′43″E
Konaseema Combined Cycle Power Plant	Konaseema Gas Power Limited (KGPL)	Ravulapalem	Konaseema	Private	445	16°44′05″N 81°51′44″E
Vemagiri Combined Cycle Power Plant	GMR	Vemagiri	E. Godavari	Private	370	16°55′29″N 81°48′46″E
GMR Rajamundry Combined Cycle Power Plant	GMR	Vemagiri	E. Godavari	Private	768	16°55′28″N 81°48′46″E
Samarlakota Combined Cycle Power Plant	Reliance	Samarlakota	Kakinada	Private	1870	17°02′19″N 82°08′05″E
Godavari Gas Power Plant	APGENCO	Jegurupadu	E. Godavari	State	216	16°55′55″N 81°51′37″E
Jegurupadu Combined Cycle Power Plant	GVK	Jegurupadu	E. Godavari	Private	229	16°55′54″N 81°51′36″E
Spectrum Combined Cycle Power Plant	Spectrum	Kakinada	Kakinada	Private	209	17°03′31″N 82°18′34″E
GMR (barge mounted) Power Plant	GMR	Kakinada	Kakinada	Private	237	17°03′32″N 82°18′33″E
LVS Diesel Engine Power Station	Greenko	Vishakhapatnam	Visakhapatnam	Private	37	17°50′45″N 83°14′13″E
Panduranga CCPP	PESPL	Annadevarapeta	W. Godavari	Private	116	17°07′45″N 81°36′09″E
RVK Energy power plant	KSK Energy Ventures	Rajahmundry	E. Godavari	Private	436	
Sriba power plant	Sriba industries	Chigurukota	Krishna	Private	30	
Silkroad sugar power plant	EID Parry	Kakinada	Kakinada	Private	35	
Srivathsa Power plant	Asian Genco			Private	17	
Total					7,217	

== Renewable ==
=== Hydroelectric ===
This is the list of major hydroelectric power plants in Andhra Pradesh.

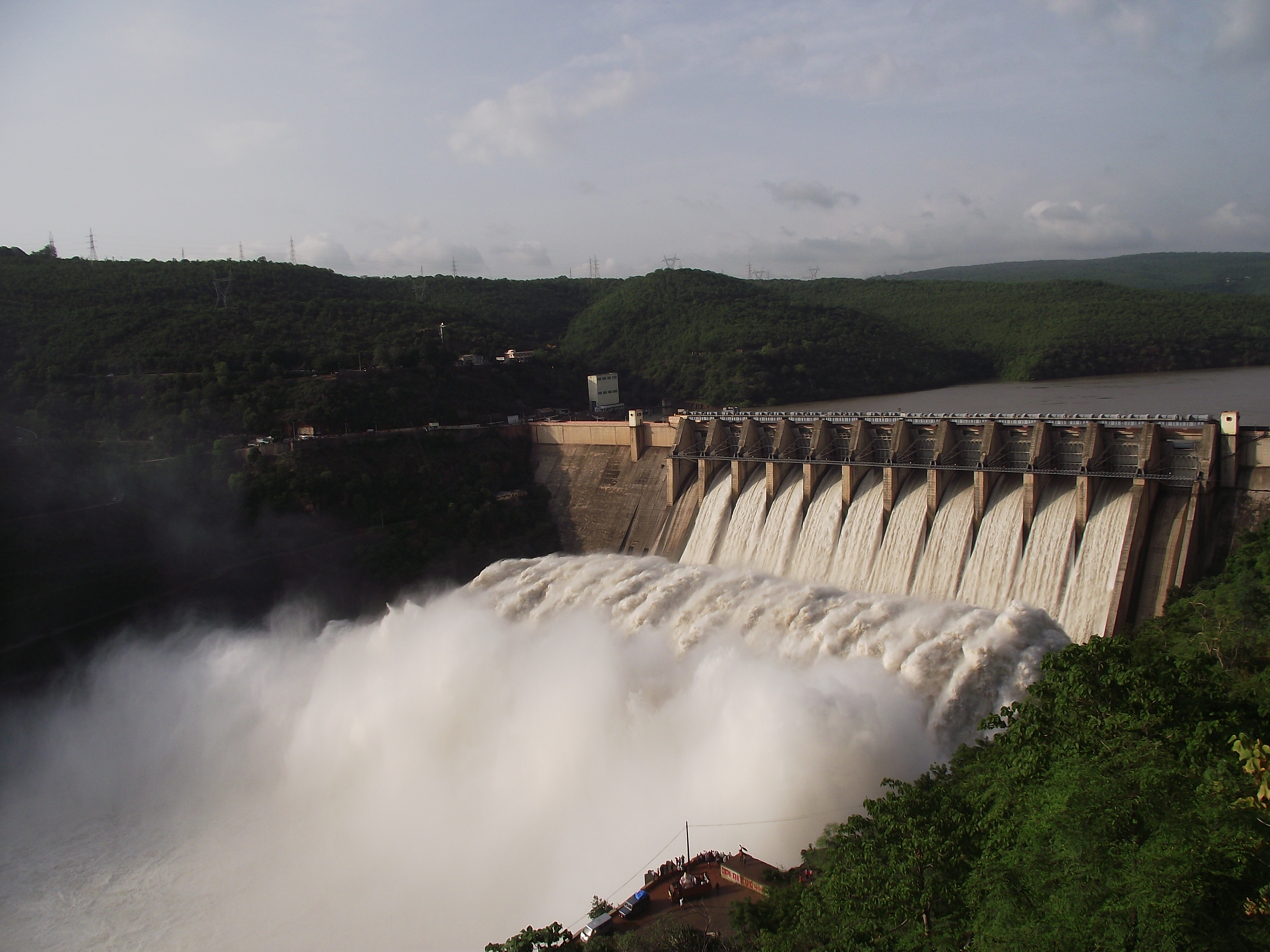
Srisailam Dam

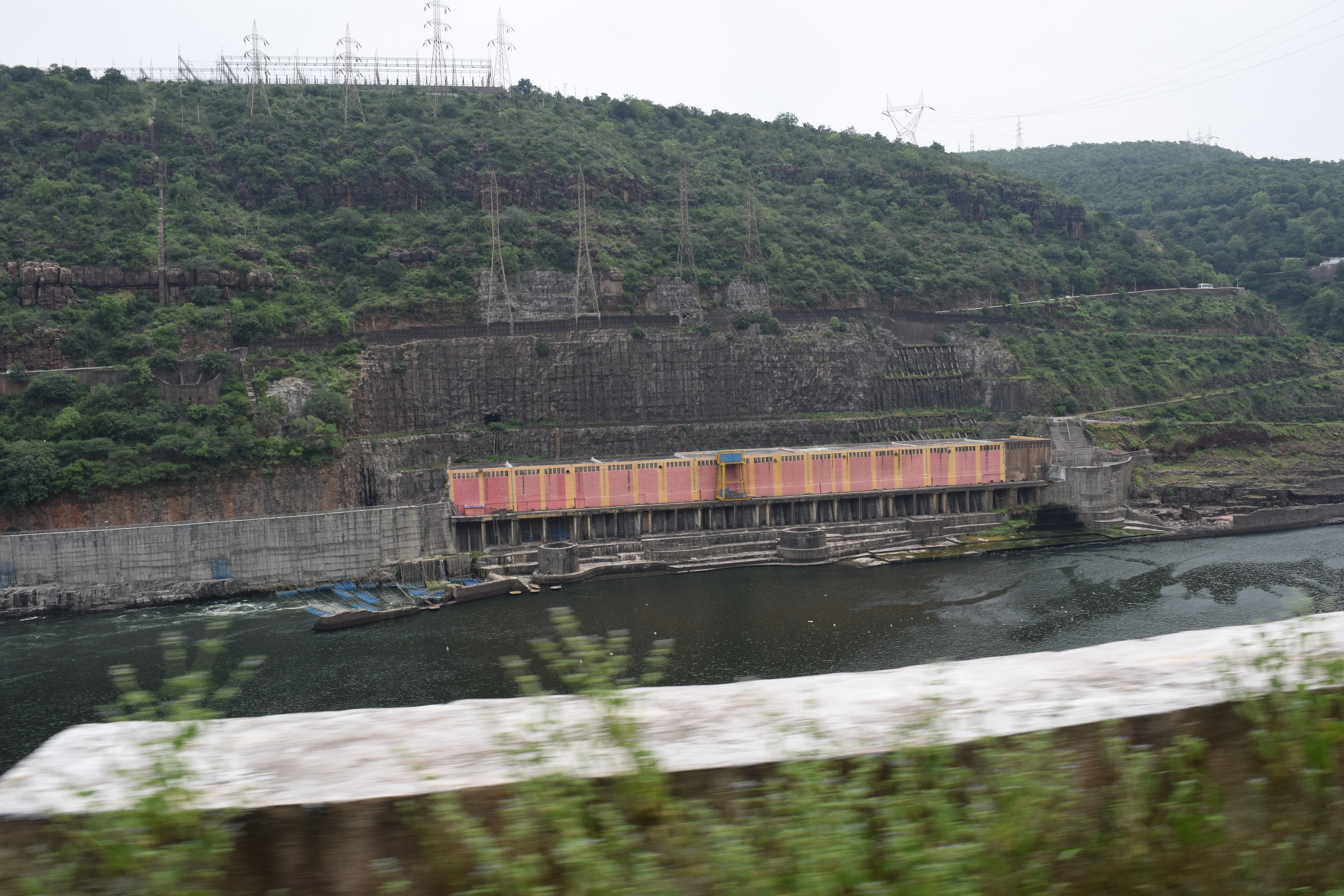
Srisailam right bank power house

Power station name	Operator	Location	Sector	Unit wise Capacity MW	Capacity MW
Donkarayi PH	APGENCO	E. Godavari	State	1x25	25.00
Hampi canal Power House (PH)	APGENCO	Joint project of AP, TS & Karnataka; Located in Karnataka	State	4 x 9 (AP Share-28.8)	28.80
Lower Sileru PH	APGENCO	E. Godavari	State	4 x 115	460.00
Machkund PH	APGENCO	Joint project of AP, TS & Odisha; Located in Odisha	State	3 x 17 + 3 x 23 (AP Share-84)	84.00
Nagarjuna Sagar Right Canal PH	APGENCO	Nagarjuna Sagar Dam, Palnadu district	State	3 x 30	90.00
Nagarjuna Sagar tail pond PH	APGENCO	Nagarjuna Sagar Dam, Palnadu district	State	2 x 25	50.00
Penna Ahobilam PH	APGENCO	Korrakodu, Anantapur district	State	2 x 10	20.00
Srisailam Right Bank PH	APGENCO	Srisailam, Nandyal	State	7 x 110	770.00
TB Dam PH	APGENCO	Joint project of AP, TS & Karnataka; Located in Karnataka	State	4 × 9 (AP Share-28.8)	28.80
Upper Sileru PH	APGENCO	Alluri Sitarama Raju	State	4 x 60	240.00
Somasila PH	Balaji Energy	Nellore	Private	2 x 5, 2 x 4, 1 x 2, 1 x 3	23.00
Chettipeta Mini Hydel	APGENCO	West Godavari district	State	2 x 0.5	1.00
Polavaram Hydro-Electric project	APGENCO	Anguluru, Polavaram district	State	12 x 80; Under Construction	
Pinnapuram Pumped Storage Project (PSP)	Greenko Energy	Nandyal district	Private	6 x 240, 2 x 120	1680
Veeraballi PSP	Astha Green	near Veeraballi, Kadapa district	Private	2720 MW; Under investigation	
Upper Sileru PSP	APGENCO	near Sileru village, Alluri Sitarama Raju	State	9 x 150 MW by 2028-29. Under construction	
Chitravati PSP	Adani Renewable Energy Fifty One Limited	near Peddakotla village, Anantapuramu district	State	2 x 250 MW by 2026-27. Under construction	
Gandikota PSP	Adani Renewable Energy FortyTwo Limited	Kurnool district	State	4 x 250 MW by 2028-29. Under construction	
Singanamala PSP	NREDCAP	Anantapuramu district	State	800 MW; Under investigation	
Overall capacity in (MW)					3500.60

=== Pumped storage hydroelectricity projects ===
Pumped hydroelectric energy storage (PHES) projects with high water head are the cheap means of converting intermittent renewable power generation sources like solar PV or wind power in to base load supply for round the clock needs throughout the year. AP state is endowed with vast PHES potential adequate to utilise its vast solar PV power generation potential (above 1,000,000 MW installed on 16,000 km^{2} marginal lands) to meet ultimate green energy requirements of its peak population (60 million). AP is considering on a major scale to install PHES projects to make available the surplus wind and solar power during the peak load hours. PHESs also generate income, in addition to hydroelectricity cess/royalty, to the state in the form of water use charges at commercial rates for the evaporation loss or consumptive water from the reservoirs. The area occupied by the high head PHES is less than the area occupied by the equivalent battery energy storage system (BESS) housed in a three storied building. High head PHES installation cost (< US$40 per KWh in a day) is less than the cost of land and buildings required to house the equivalent BESS. PHES are more suitable in India where energy and water storage needs are complementary. Unlike the static BESS, the rotating turbo-generator of a PHES will enhance dynamic inertia (GD^{2}) of the grid which contributes to a stable grid to ride through the power disturbances when power generation in the grid is dominated by the static solar PV power. Variable speed PHES plants also deliver the power grid ancillary services. In high head PHES, unlined pressure tunnels/shafts are constructed to the extent feasible for reducing construction cost.

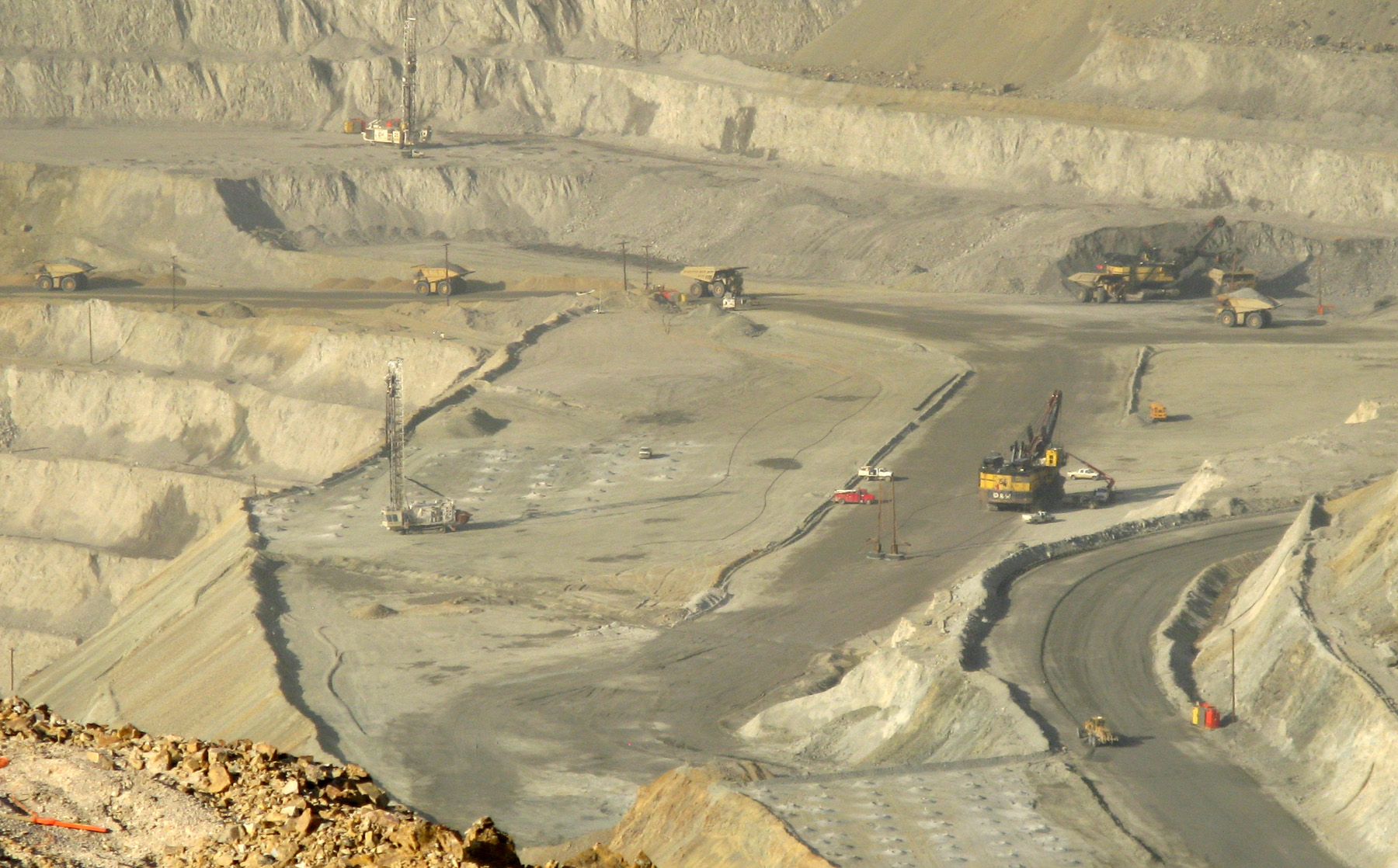
Blast-hole drilling at an open-cast mine

The water reservoir of a PHES is created by building embankment dams wherever required up to the required height and length. The rock required for building the dams is excavated from the reservoir area. Cheaper drilling and blasting method is extensively used deploying state of the art earth moving equipment because huge quantity of rock excavation is required for the construction of the rock-fill dams.

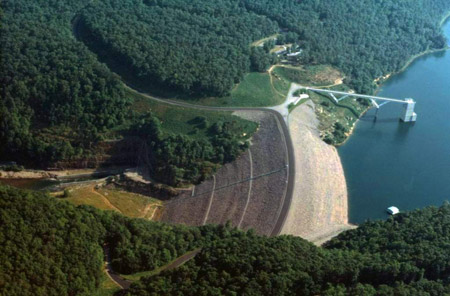
A rock-fill embankment dam

Polavaram right bank PHES: A 103,000 MW PHES project is under investigation with an upper reservoir, located near Parantapalle hamlet in West Godavari district, with 90 tmcft live storage at 700 m msl full reservoir level (FRL). The turkey-nest type upper reservoir is 18 km long from north to south and 1.1 km wide and its water surface area is 16 km^{2} with 200 m water depth and nearly 90 tmcft live storage. The adjacent Polavaram reservoir at FRL 45 m msl with 194 tmcft gross storage is the lower reservoir as perennial water source. The average water head available is 600 m with a provision to draw 33 tmcft/day from the Polavaram reservoir by the PHES units located in semi open or underground power houses. To run the PHES on daily basis, the lower reservoir is to be kept empty by 33 tmcft below its FRL for holding the water released by PHES in generation mode. Another 33 tmcft is used to compensate the loss of storage capacity in the lower reservoir. This buffer storage is released in to lower reservoir for irrigation, etc. needs once in a year at the end of monsoon year and it is replenished at the earliest from the flood water inflows into the lower reservoir. Also seepage and evaporation losses from the upper reservoir are met from the buffer storage sourced from flood waters and not drawn from the lower reservoir storage. The excess buffer storage maintained in this upper reservoir can also serve up to 24 tmcft for other PHESs in the state which are using Godavari basin water and have no buffer storage of their own (ex: Jalaput PHES). The upper reservoir can be further expanded by 3.5 km length on its south side to enhance the live / buffer storage substantially. The PHES project can produce 412 billion KWh at 4000 hours/year or 12 hours/day operation in generation mode by consuming the surplus power generated from the solar and wind power plants during the day time. This PHES can also moderate the severe floods by utilizing empty volume kept in the lower reservoir or operating in pump mode (maximum 7.63 lakh cusecs) to fill the upper reservoir. In case of emergency / repairs, the entire water storage in the upper reservoir can be emptied safely into the lower reservoir / river within 24 hours by running the PHES in generation mode.

Srisailam right bank PHES: A 77,000 MW PHES project is feasible with an upper reservoir, located on the right bank side within 1000 m distance of Srisailam reservoir, with 87 tmcft live storage at 650 m msl FRL. The reservoir bunds are constructed on 500 m msl contour line by 155 m high and the water surface area of the upper reservoir is nearly 20 km^{2}. The adjacent Srisailam reservoir at FRL 270 m msl with 185 tmcft live storage is the lower reservoir with perennial water source. The average water head available is 340 m with provision to draw water from the Srisailam reservoir by the PHES units located in semi open or underground power houses. The PHES project can produce 308 billion KWh at 4000 hours/year or 12 hours/day operation in generation mode. Only 43.5 tmcft (50%) reservoir storage is used for power generation on daily basis and the remaining half kept as buffer storage to compensate the loss of storage in downstream reservoir due to PHES by releasing water once in a year in to the Srisailam reservoir to meet irrigation water requirements. The buffer storage is replenished later at the earliest during the monsoon/floods. This PHES can also moderate the severe floods by utilizing empty volume kept in the lower reservoir or operating in pump mode (maximum 10 lakh cusecs) to fill the upper reservoir.

=== Feasible PHES projects ===
List of feasible PHES locations
PHES name/ lower reservoir	Power potential (MW)	Power generation (Billion KWh/yr)	Upper reservoir							Average water head (meters)	Remarks
PHES name/ lower reservoir	Power potential (MW)	Power generation (Billion KWh/yr)	Location	Coordinate	River basin	Water area (km^{2})	Live storage (tmcft)	FRL (m msl)	MDDL (m msl)	Average water head (meters)	Remarks
Polavaram right bank PHES	103,000	412	Polavaram district	17°27′33″N 81°29′43″E	Godavari	16	90	700	500	600	57 tmcft buffer storage available. The distance between the two reservoirs is nearly 1.7 km.
Srisailam right bank PHES	77,000	308	Nandyal district	16°02′33″N 78°30′51″E	Krishna	20	87	650	500	340	43.5 tmcft buffer storage included. The distance between the two reservoirs is nearly 1.1 km.
Gandikota PHES1	28,000	112	Kadapa district	14°49′47″N 78°13′41″E	Penna	21	52	435	335	210	Buffer storage 26 tmcft provided. The distance between the two reservoirs is nearly 2.1 km.
Gandikota PHES2	600	1.12	Kadapa district	14°46′29″N 78°17′7″E	Penna	1	0.16	515	505	303	It is a peaking PHES with six hours daily operation in generation mode. No buffer storage is provided. The distance between the two reservoirs is nearly 2.8 km.
Paidipalem PHES1	1,850	7.4	Kadapa district	14°43′47″N 78°11′9″E	Penna	1	2.5	600	510	285	Buffer storage 1.25 tmcft provided. The distance between the two reservoirs is nearly 3.1 km.
Paidipalem PHES2	2,750	11	Kadapa district	14°41′21″N 78°13′25″E	Penna	1.5	3.7	600	500	285	Buffer storage 1.85 tmcft provided. The distance between the two reservoirs is nearly 2.9 km.
Buggavanka PHES	600	2.4	Kadapa district	14°24′5″N 78°52′15″E	Penna	0.8	0.9	470	410	260	Buffer storage 0.45 tmcft provided. The distance between the two reservoirs is nearly 3.5 km.
Annamayya PHES	1150	4.6	Kadapa district	14°12′25″N 78°57′51″E	Penna	1.1	1.6	555	455	285	Buffer storage 0.8 tmcft provided. Distance between the two reservoirs is nearly 6 km.
Mylavaram PHES	14,000	56	Kadapa district	14°48′1″N 78°16′35″E	Penna	9	20	500	375	275	Buffer storage 10 tmcft provided. The distance between the two reservoirs is nearly 3.7 km.
Brahmamsagar PHES	13,000	52	Kadapa district	14°46′27″N 78°52′3″E	Penna	9.5	38	400	250	130	Buffer storage 19 tmcft provided. The distance between the two reservoirs is nearly 1.5 km.
Telugu Ganga subsidiary reservoirs PHES	2,600	10.4	Nandyal district	14°51′25″N 78°43′51″E	Penna	4	8	400	250	120	Buffer storage 4 tmcft provided. The distance between the two reservoirs is nearly 1.5 km.
Owk PHES1	4,700	18.8	Nandyal district	15°14′51″N 78°2′49″E	Penna	100	210	500	350	220	Works on a seasonal basis to store 201.7 tmcft Krishna and Godavari waters as well as PHES on daily basis. The stored water is also used as carryover storage to meet water shortages in drought years. Buffer storage 4.15 tmcft included. This upper reservoir will supply irrigation water to the Handri catchment area in the Kurnool district and the left bank side of the Penna river in the Ananthapur district including water supply augmentation to the Handri-Neeva project. This upper reservoir is so planned by its area location to cut across the local Erramala hill range from east to west to supply irrigation water mostly by gravity. The distance between the two reservoirs is nearly 5.7 km.
Owk PHES2	800	1.65	Nandyal district	15°9′37″N 78°4′5″E	Penna	0.6	0.4	400	380	165	Peaking PHES for 6 hours daily operation. No Buffer storage is provided. The distance between the two reservoirs is nearly 1.5 km.
Gorakallu PHES	12,500	50	Nandyal district	15°35′33″N 78°22′17″E	Penna	37	100	450	300	170	Works on a seasonal basis to store 71.4 tmcft Krishna and Godavari waters and otherwise as PHES on daily basis. The stored water is also used as carryover storage to meet water shortages in drought years. Buffer storage 14.28 tmcft included. The distance between the two reservoirs is nearly 2.3 km.
Velugodu PHES	7,800	31	Nandyal district	15°42′21″N 78°39′25″E	Penna	40	100	420	270	100	Works on a seasonal basis to store 70 tmcft Krishna and Godavari waters and otherwise as PHES on daily basis. The stored water is also used as carryover storage to meet water shortages in drought years. Buffer storage 15 tmcft included. The distance between the two reservoirs is nearly 3.1 km.
Mid Pennar PHES	2,600	10.4	Anantapur district	14°52′47″N 77°23′27″E	Penna	3.75	10	525	375	100	Buffer storage 5 tmcft included. The distance between the two reservoirs is nearly 0.7 km.
Chitravati PHES	500	0.95	Sri Sathya Sai district	14°34′27″N 77°56′3″E	Penna	0.5	0.21	475	455	176	Peaking load PHES. No buffer storage is included. The distance between the two reservoirs is nearly 0.81 km.
Somasila PHES	1,200	2.3	Nellore district	14°30′57″N 79°16′25″E	Penna	1	0.18	624	600	511	Peaking load PHES. No buffer storage is included. The distance between the two reservoirs is nearly 2.9 km.
Kalyani PHES	3,700	14.8	Tirupati district	13°43′9″N 79°18′47″E	Swarnamukhi	1.5	1.8	1100	1000	790	Buffer storage 0.9 tmcft included. The distance between the two reservoirs is nearly 7.5 km. The upper reservoir of the PHES can also supply water to Tirumala in case of water shortages.
Yeleru PHES	5,500	22	Kakinada district	17°20′1″N 82°9′23″E	Yeleru	2.00	5.3	500	350	400	Buffer storage 2.65 tmcft included. The distance between the two reservoirs is nearly 5.5 km.
Tandava PHES	9,200	36.8	Anakapalli district	17°43′35″N 82°27′47″E	Tandava	1.50	4	1050	850	875	Buffer storage 2 tmcft included. The distance between the two reservoirs is nearly 7.5 km.
Raiwada PHES	2,350	9.4	Anakapalli district	18°3′17″N 82°54′55″E	Sarada	0.50	2	635	485	450	Buffer storage 1 tmcft included. The distance between the two reservoirs is nearly 4.85 km.
Pedderu PHES	1,425	5.5	Anakapalli district	17°52′37″N 82°40′9″E	Sarada	0.25	0.7	950	850	780	Buffer storage 0.35 tmcft included. The distance between the two reservoirs is nearly 3.1 km. Water to rock ratio at least 2.
Konam PHES	2,200	8.8	Anakapalli district	17°55′47″N 82°40′19″E	Sarada	1.2	1.7	725	625	495	Buffer storage 0.85 tmcft included. The distance between the two reservoirs is nearly 5.8 km.
NTR PHES	650	2.6	Alluri Sitharama Raju district	17°57′35″N 82°46′35″E	Sarada	0.2	0.4	775	700	640	Buffer storage 0.2 tmcft included. The distance between the two reservoirs is nearly 2.6 km.
Varaha PHES	1,300	4.2	Anakapalli district	17°49′25″N 82°42′5″E	Varaha	0.52	0.75	820	750	660	Buffer storage 0.37 tmcft included. The distance between the two reservoirs is nearly 3.6 km. Water to rock ratio at least 2.
Tatipudi PHES	9,000	36	Vizianagaram district	18°15′25″N 83°8′41″E	Gosthani	2	6.5	700	500	535	Buffer storage 3.25 tmcft included. Distance between the two reservoirs is nearly 7.5 km.
Andra PHES	2,500	10	Vizianagaram district	18°22′7″N 83°9′55″E	Champavati	0.7	1.8	800	710	520	Buffer storage 0.9 tmcft included. Distance between the two reservoirs is nearly 4.3 km.
Peddagadda PHES	3,100	12.4	Vizianagaram district	18°23′41″N 83°4′41″E	Nagavali	1.8	2	790	650	600	Buffer storage 1 tmcft included. Distance between the two reservoirs is nearly 7 km.
Vengalaraya Sagar PHES	2,250	9	Vizianagaram district	18°37′7″N 83°14′55″E	Nagavali	0.5	2	660	510	430	Buffer storage 1 tmcft included. The distance between the two reservoirs is nearly 2.65 km. Water to rock ratio at least 2.
Vattigedda PHES	1,250	5	Vizianagaram district	18°49′41″N 83°37′23″E	Nagavali	0.9	1.8	440	290	255	Buffer storage 0.9 tmcft included. The distance between the two reservoirs is nearly 2.85 km. Water to rock ratio at least 2.
Nagavali PHES	250	1	Vizianagaram district	18°36′57″N 83°50′1″E	Nagavali	4	10	300	140	200	Pumps water @ 5500 cusecs on a seasonal basis to store 9.75 tmcft Nagavali river flood waters. The stored water during monsoon months is released back in later months during the night time for irrigation needs. Rest of the year, PHES works on a daily basis to generate power during nighttime. The stored water is also used as carryover storage to meet water shortages in drought years. A new barrage with 0.25 tmcft live storage will be constructed near 18°32′57″N 83°48′5″E across the Nagavali river to divert water to the tunnel of the PHES. Buffer storage 0.25 tmcft included. The distance between the upper reservoir and the river is nearly 8.25 km.
Jhanjavati PHES	2,350	9.4	Vizianagaram district	18°53′7″N 83°23′51″E	Nagavali	0.5	1.5	530	330	300	No buffer storage required as the lower reservoir is not used presently. The distance between the two reservoirs is nearly 2.37 km. Water to rock ratio at least 2. The unused reservoir area on the right of the Jhanjavati river is isolated from the river by constructing a 2.2 km long earth bund up to 150 m msl to create 1.5 tmcft water storage for using as a lower reservoir.
Hiramandalam PHES	2,500	10	Srikakulam district	18°41′19″N 83°52′57″E	Vamsadhara	3	7	240	90	135	3.5 tmcft buffer storage included. The distance between the two reservoirs is nearly 4.5 km.
Gotta barrage PHES	750 + 10,000 = 10,750	1.5	Srikakulam district	18°41′39″N 84°1′15″E	Vamsadhara	40	80	220	70	135	The main purpose of this PHES is to store up to 79 tmcft flood waters which are going waste to the sea every year. The stored water is also used as carryover storage to meet water shortages in drought years. The PHES pumps flood water @ 23,000 cusecs from the Vamsdhara river during the monsoon months and works as PHES the rest of the year. Buffer storage 0.5 tmcft included. The distance between the two reservoirs is nearly 1.0 km. The upper reservoir of this PHES can also be connected to the Hiramandalam reservoir at 18°40′5″N 83°56′37″E (20 tmcft storage) by 1.2 km long tail race tunnels across the Vamsadhara River to use 16.5 tmcft per day by installing a 10,000 MW PHES to generate power for nine months duration in a year when the reservoir is empty by 16.5 tmcft or more.
Kumbum PHES	2,200	8.8	Prakasam district	15°37′35″N 79°5′1″E	Gundlakamma	5.5	5.8	380	255	140	Buffer storage 2.9 tmcft included. The distance between the two reservoirs is nearly 2.3 km.
Nallamala Sagar PHES1	26,500	106	Markapuram district	15°40′37″N 79°5′5″E	Gundlakamma	77	84.5	380	240	120	Buffer storage 42.25 tmcft included. The distance between the two reservoirs is nearly 2 km.
Nallamala Sagar PHES2	900	3.6	Markapuram district	15°39′25″N 79°4′23″E	Gundlakamma	1.5	2.5	380	230	130	Buffer storage 1.25 tmcft included. Distance between the two reservoirs is nearly 1.75 km.
Nagarjuna Sagar Dam Right Bank PHES	1,500	1.5	Nandyal district	16°5′39″N 78°54′51″E	Krishna	-	-	270	245	90	Mainly works to pump water from existing Nagarjunasagar reservoir into existing Srisailam reservoir on a seasonal basis to store Krishna and Godavari waters and otherwise as PHES on daily basis. The distance between the two reservoirs is nearly 3.1 km.
Nagarjuna Sagar Right Bank PHES1	37,000	148	Palnadu district	16°5′51″N 78°55′51″E	Krishna	8	34	650	500	425	Buffer storage 17 tmcft provided. The minimum level to be maintained in Nagarjunasagar reservoir is 164 m msl. The distance between the two reservoirs is nearly 1.1 km.
Nagarjuna Sagar Right Bank PHES2	112,000	448	Prakasam district	16°7′45″N 78°56′19″E	Krishna	21	101	650	500	425	Buffer storage 50.5 tmcft provided. The minimum level to be maintained in Nagarjunasagar reservoir is 164 m msl. The distance between the two reservoirs is nearly 1.5 km.
Nagarjuna Sagar Right Bank PHES3	66,000	264	Prakasam district	16°10′7″N 78°55′35″E	Krishna	11	59	650	500	428	Buffer storage 29.5 tmcft provided. The minimum level to be maintained in Nagarjunasagar reservoir is 164 m msl and the corresponding loss of live storage located below this level in Nagarjunasagar reservoir can be included in the buffer storage of PHESs. The distance between the two reservoirs is nearly 2.9 km.
Nagarjuna Sagar tail pond PHES	1,500	1.0	Palnadu district	16°34′39″N 79°20′25″E	Krishna	-	-	180	164	105	Mainly works to pump water from existing Nagarjuna Sagar tail pond into existing Nagarjuna Sagar reservoir on a seasonal basis to store Krishna and Godavari waters and otherwise as PHES on daily basis.
Pulichintala Right Bank PHES	300	0.2	Palnadu district	16°37′49″N 79°31′11″E	Krishna	-	2	75	72	25	Mainly works to pump water from existing Pulichintala reservoir into existing Nagarjuna Sagar tail pond on a seasonal basis to store Krishna and Godavari waters and otherwise as PHES on daily basis.
Vykuntapuram PHES	400	0.2	Guntur district	16°46′43″N 80°3′55″E	Krishna	-	-	55	50	25	Mainly works to pump water from backwaters of new Vykuntapuram barrage across Krishna river upstream of Prakasam Barrage to existing Pulichintala reservoir on a seasonal basis to store Krishna and Godavari waters and otherwise as PHES on daily basis.
Jalaput PHES	65,000	260	Alluri Sitharama Raju district	18°26′53″N 82°28′11″E	Sileru	-	31.5	838.4	818.6	380	The PHES is constructed by connecting existing Jalaput reservoir with existing Balimela Reservoir (MDDL at 439 m msl, FRL at 462 m msl and live storage 95 tmcft) by a 13 km long unlined pressure tunnel/penstock with underground power station.
Donkarayi PHES	35,000	140	Polavaram district	17°54′47″N 81°51′45″E	Sileru	20	26	900	750	550	13 tmcft buffer storage provided. The buffer storage can be enhanced by another 35 tmcft by increasing the FRL to 950 m msl to serve other PHES which are using Godavari water. Distance between the two reservoirs is nearly 3.7 km.
Bhupathipalem PHES	800	3.2	Alluri Sitharama Raju district	17°28′35″N 81°47′49″E	Godavari	1	1	540	480	310	0.5 tmcft buffer storage provided. The distance between the two reservoirs is nearly 4.5 km.
Polavaram Left bank PHES1	43,000	172	Eluru district	17°29′51″N 81°27′53″E	Godavari	5	18	600	450	470	The required 18 tmcft buffer storage is provided in other PHESs located in the Godavari river basin. The distance between the two reservoirs is nearly 3.1 km.
Polavaram Left bank PHES2	12,000	48	Eluru district	17°29′15″N 81°31′37″E	Godavari	2	4.5	600	450	530	The required 4.5 tmcft buffer storage is provided in other PHESs located in the Godavari river basin. The distance between the two reservoirs is nearly 1.7 km.
Seshachalam PHES	6,200	24.8	Tirupati district	13°44′25″N 79°12′5″E	Penna	6	2.1	610	600	525	The main purpose of this PHES is to transfer Krishna and Godavari waters @ 50,000 cusecs to high lands of Rayalaseema with only one lift from 80 m msl 13°57′47″N 79°32′5″E near Venkatagiri town in Nellore district to the upper reservoir at 610 m msl in Chittoor district to irrigate by gravity canal vast high lands in Rayalaseema region up to Bhairivani tippa reservoir on Vedavathi River in Ananthapur district. This underground power station will also work as PHES. PHES powerhouse is to be connected to a 41 km long unlined pressure tunnel which will work as penstocks to the turbine units.
Total	735,550	2,900	-	-	-	460	1225	-	-	-	

Notes: Power potential (MW) is in generation mode, MDDL→ Minimum Draw Down Level or lowest bed level of the reservoir, FRL→ Full Reservoir Level, m msl→ meters above mean sea level. The total water storage includes nearly 432 tmcft of irrigation components. PHES water storage is 793 tmcft only. The PHES land requirement is nearly 1% of the land required (41,250 km^{2}) for equivalent electricity generation by Solar PV power plants. The power potential doubles in case of pumping operation for six hours in a day for the same water storage. Wherever, the length of penstock of each water turbine is found too long, the available head can be harnessed by constructing two PHES stations in cascade with an embankment canal to route water to the second PHES station.

=== Solar ===
Map of currently operating and proposed Solar power plants in the Indian state of Andhra Pradesh. Green are currently Operating and blue are proposed.

The state is endowed with vast photovoltaic power potential on its marginally productive lands. The state has total installed solar power capacity of 4,116.01 MW as of 30 June 2021.

The state is planning to add 10,050 MW solar power capacity to provide power supply to farming sector during the day time. Out of 10,050 MW, 6,400 MW capacity at 10 sites were offered for bidding. The winning tariffs are Rs 2.50 per unit which are at least 25% more than the earlier awarded tariffs of Rs 2 per unit in November 2020 even after reducing scope of work (no HV transmission line construction outside the solar park), state providing the land on lease, giving state guarantee for the timely payment for the power sold, allowing the state guarantee as security to get financial assistance at lower interest rates, disregarding higher solar power potential at these sites compared to Western and northern regions, etc. The AP high court has stayed the award of contracts to the successful bidders on the grounds that these contracts are excluded from the jurisdiction of APERC in contravention of the electricity act, 2003.

The state has offered five Ultra Mega Solar Power Projects with a total capacity of 12,200 MW to developers under renewable power export policy outside the state.

Name	Operator	Location	District	Sector	Installed Capacity (MW)
Kurnool Ultra Mega Solar Park	NTPC	Pinnapuram	Kurnool district	central	1,000
NP Kunta Ultra Mega Solar Power Project	Many	Nambulapulakunta (Kadiri)	Sri Sathya Sai district	central	978
Ananthapuramu - II Mega Solar Park	APGENCO	Talaricheruvu	Anantapur district	state	400
Galiveedu Solar Park		Marrikommadinne, Galiveedu mandal	Annamayya district	central	400
Kadapa Ultra Mega Solar Park	ENGIE	Ponnampalle, Mylavaram mandal	Kadapa district	state	250
Amruth Solar Power Plant	Amrit Jal Ventures	Kadiri	Sri Sathya Sai district	private	1
MEIL solar thermal	Megha Engineering & Infrastructures Limited	Nagalapuram	Anantapur district	private	50
Banaganapalle solar	Welspun	Vemulapadu, Banaganapalle mandal	Nandyal district	private	70
Hindupur solar	ACME	Patraganipalle, Hindupur mandal	Sri Sathya Sai district	private	50
Yadiki solar	Azure Power	Vemulapadu, Yadiki mandal	Anantapur district	private	50
Kuppam solar	ACME	Morsanapalli, Kuppam mandal	Chittoor district	Private	40
Parigi solar	First Solar	Beechiganipalle, Parigi mandal	Sri Sathya Sai district	Private	40
Mudasarlova Reservoir Solar Park	APGENCO	Visakhapatnam	Visakhapatnam district	state	2
Simhadri floating solar	NTPC	Visakhapatnam	Visakhapatnam district	central	25

=== Wind power ===
Map of currently operating and proposed wind power plants in the Indian state of Andhra Pradesh

The state has total installed wind power capacity of 4,083.57 MW as on 30 June 2021.

Name	Operator	Location	District	Sector	Unit-wise capacity (MW)	Installed capacity (MW)
Ramagiri Wind Mills	APGENCO	Ramagiri	Sri Sathya Sai	State	10 × 0.2	2.00
Narmada Wind farm	CLP Wind Farms (India) Private Ltd.	Nallakonda	Sri Sathya Sai	Private	1 × 50.4	50.04
Puthlur RCI Wind farm	Wescare (India) Ltd.	Puthlur	Anantapur	Private	1 × 20	20.00

== Other utility power plants ==
In addition to above projects, there are nearly 103 MW small Hydro plants, nearly 490 MW bagasse, industrial & municipal waste, bio-mass co-generation, & bio-mass based power projects, nearly 78.79 mini power plants (grid connected) and nearly 67.20 MW other (grid connected) plants based on isolated gas wells, etc. in private sector. These power plants are not covering captive power capacity in various industries that are not grid connected. In addition, there are innumerable diesel generator sets installed in the state for stand by supply and emergency power supply needs during power outages.

== Transmission system ==
Per capita power generation
Year	Kwh/head
2014–15	1,040
2015–16	1,230
2016–17	1,319
2017–18	1,388
2018–19	1,480
2019–20	1,507
2020–21	1,434
2021–22	1,567

The state has well spread transmission system. APTransCo / DisComs owned and operated transmission lines from 400 kV to 11 kV is 231,127 circuit kilometers excluding the HT lines owned and operated by PGCIL in the state. For importing and exporting power, the state grid is well interconnected with adjoining western and eastern regional grids in addition to adjoining state grids. The spread of high voltage transmission lines (≥ 11 kV) is such that it can form a square matrix of area 1.93 km^{2} (i.e. on average, at least one HT line within 0.7 km vicinity) in 160,205 km^{2} total area of the state. DisComs owned and operated LT lines (below 11 kV) are 292,158 circuit kilometers. It represents that there is at least one HT or LT line availability on average within the vicinity of 306 meters in the entire state area. The state has 3183 nos substations (≥ 33 kV) which represents one substation in every 50.33 km^{2} area on average (i.e. one substation with in 3.6 km distance on average). However the maximum peak load met is 9,453 MW as of 14 October 2018. Huge installed capacity of the transmission network and the substations are being underutilized with low demand factor.

== Regional operations ==
Power distribution in the state is divided into three divisions, namely Eastern Power Distribution Corporation Limited (APEPDCL), Central Power Distribution Corporation Limited (APCPDCL) and Southern Power Distribution Corporation Limited (APSPDCL), which distributes the power to the households, agriculture and the industries.

=== APEPDCL ===
Eastern Power Distribution Company of Andhra Pradesh Limited
- Type: State Government-owned Corporation
- Industry: Electricity Distribution
- Founded: March 31, 2000
- Headquarters: Visakhapatnam, Andhra Pradesh, India
- Key people: Prudhvi Tej Immadi (Chairman & MD)
- Products: Electricity
- Owner: Government of Andhra Pradesh
- Website: www.apeasternpower.com

Andhra Pradesh Eastern Power Distribution Company Limited or APEPDCL is a state-owned Electricity Distribution company. It is owned by the Government of Andhra Pradesh.

The present CMD is Immadi Prudhvi Tej, IAS.

APEPDCL was incorporated under the Companies Act, 1956 as a Public Limited Company on 31 March 2000 with headquarters at Visakhapatnam. APEPDCL encompasses in 12 districts in the state of Andhra Pradesh. The districts are Srikakulam, Alluri Sitharama Raju, Polavaram, Vizianagaram, Parvathipuram Manyam, Visakhapatnam, Anakapalli, Kakinada, East Godavari, Konaseema, Eluru and West Godavari.

=== APCPDCL ===
Andhra Pradesh Central Power Distribution Corporation Limited
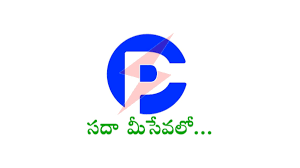
- Type: State Government-owned Corporation
- Industry: Electricity Distribution
- Founded: December 05, 2019
- Headquarters: Vijayawada, Andhra Pradesh, India
- Products: Electricity
- Website: apcpdcl.in

Andhra Pradesh Central Power Distribution Corporation Limited (also known as APCPDCL), (HQ: Vijayawada), is a power distribution company owned by the state government of Andhra Pradesh. It was formed on 05-12-2019, as part of a demerger in 2019, to cater the electricity needs of seven districts in Andhra Pradesh state.

The present CMD is Ravi Pattanshetti, IAS. It serves Guntur, Bapatla, Palnadu, Krishna, NTR, Prakasam, Markapuram districts, an area of 56868 square kilometres, in Andhra Pradesh state. The corporation has 1176 MVA of electric distribution capacity with 9659 employees serving in the corporation.

=== APSPDCL ===
Andhra Pradesh Southern Power Distribution Company Limited
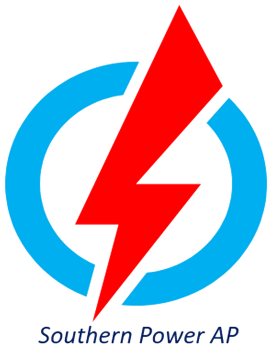
- Type: State Government-owned Corporation
- Industry: Electricity Distribution
- Founded: April 01, 2000
- Headquarters: Tirupati, Andhra Pradesh, India
- Key people: Siva Sankar Lotheti, IAS (Chairman & MD)
- Products: Electricity
- Website: www.apspdcl.in

Andhra Pradesh Southern Power Distribution Company Limited (also known as APSPDCL) is a power distribution company owned by the state government of Andhra Pradesh. It was incorporated on 1 April 2000 under the Companies Act, 1956 as part of the power sector reforms.

The company is headquartered in Tirupati and is responsible for distribution of electricity in the southern districts of Andhra Pradesh. The present CMD is Siva Sankar Lotheti, IAS, who assumed charge in October 2025.

APSPDCL serves districts including Tirupati, Chittoor, Annamayya, Kadapa, Anantapuramu, Sri Sathya Sai, Kurnool, Nandyal and Nellore.

== See also ==
- Andhra Pradesh Power Generation Corporation
- Transmission system performance parameters
- Grid energy storage
- HVDC Sileru–Barsoor
- List of power stations in India
- Electricity sector in India
- Energy policy of India
- List of largest power stations in the world
- States of India by installed power capacity
- Transmission Corporation of Andhra Pradesh
