= Economy of Vijayawada =

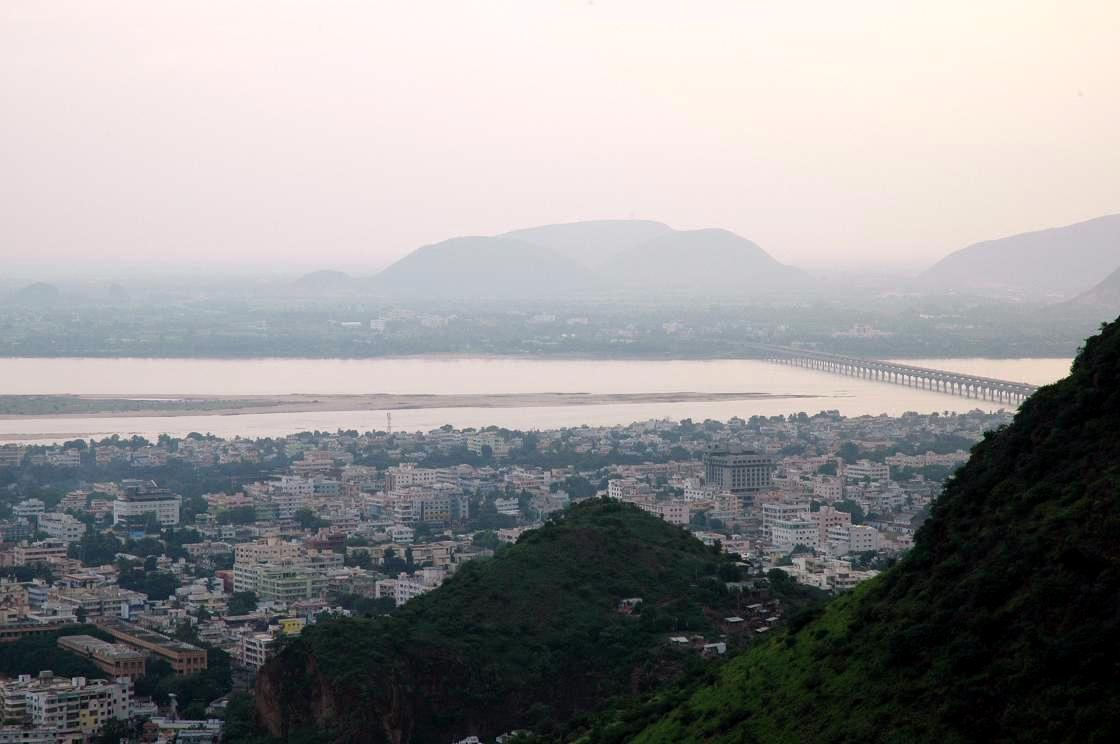
Overview of Vijayawada city

Vijayawada is the second-largest city in the state of Andhra Pradesh of India. It is one of the Tier-II cities and is categorized under the B-1 graded cities of India . Factors contributing to its economic growth include agricultural exports, tourism, resources, industries and transportation etc. The economy depends largely on trade and commerce, which provides entrepreneurial growth. About 70% of working people are involved in tertiary activities. According to one study, the GDP of the city in 2010 was $3 billion (Rs. 18,000 crore) and is expected to grow up to $17 billion (Rs. 1,02,000 crore) by 2025. According to another by Oxford the GDP of the city in 2018 was $5.8 billion and is expected to grow up to $21 billion by 2035.

== Agriculture ==
Farms and plantations in the area are irrigated using water from the Krishna River and Prakasham Barrage. The city is one of the largest exporters of mango in the state of Andhra Pradesh and earns revenue from the mango plantations. Other important crops include rice and sugarcane.

In 2024, the agriculture sector in Andhra Pradesh recorded a Gross Value Added (GVA) of ₹5.19 lakh crore, reflecting a growth of 15.86%. Sub-sectors such as horticulture, livestock, and fisheries also expanded, with fishing and aquaculture achieving a growth rate of 16%.

== Industrial sector ==
Industrial sector is based mainly on agro products processing, textile, automobile body building, hardware, consumer goods, fertilizers, and small industries. The two well equipped industrial estates in Vijayawada are Auto-Nagar and other is near to Kondapalli.

Agro-based and textile industries

Vijayawada is the hub of agricultural markets of Krishna district. The trade and agro commodities export good such as Tobacco, cotton, turmeric and mangoes, and solvent extract plants, oil, dal and rice mills are located around the city. There are textile markets at Old Town, Kaleswara Rao market area, Governorpet and Besant Road for the textile trade.

Automobile and heavy industries

Auto Nagar industrial estate, also known as Jawahar Lal Nehru Auto Nagar Estate, is an industrial park dedicated to the automobile industry. It is one of the largest of its kind in Asia.

The industrial estate in Kondapalli has a 450 acres (1.8 km^{2}) industrial park with more than 800 industries.

Industrial parks

There are some industrial parks present and proposed in and around the city. Apparel Park, is an industrial development project, spread over an area 1,000 acres (400 ha), and is located at 25 km from the city. L&T Hitech City Limited, a proposed IT/ITES SEZ project, spread over an area of 30 km^{2} (12 sq mi), is located near Gannavaram airport. IT park, proposed in an area of 40 km^{2} (15 sq mi), is located in Mangalagiri town, near Vijayawada.

=== Software Industry ===
The city is also attracting many international IT companies. HCL Technologies, wipro, the Noida-based Indian multinational is constructing its Vijayawada campus in Kesarapalli Village, near to Gannaravam. In the first phase HCL will provide employment to 5,000 students.

=== Wholesale ===
In November 2012 Metro Cash & Carry a German-based wholesale company opened its store in Vijayawada with a total build up area of 3 acres. The store has amore than 10,000 items. The store's parking facility can accommodate 200 cars.

== Transportation ==
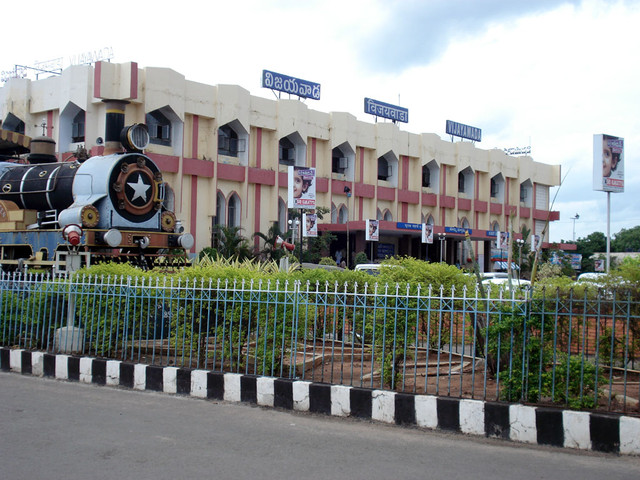
Vijayawada Railway Station

The city is well connected to the rest of the country by National Highways and Railways, boosting trade. Vijayawada railway station with A-1 status, is one of the important railway junctions in India contributing the highest revenues to the South Central Railway. It also has a domestic airport at Gannavaram, which is the headquarters for regional airliner Air Costa.

=== Air ===
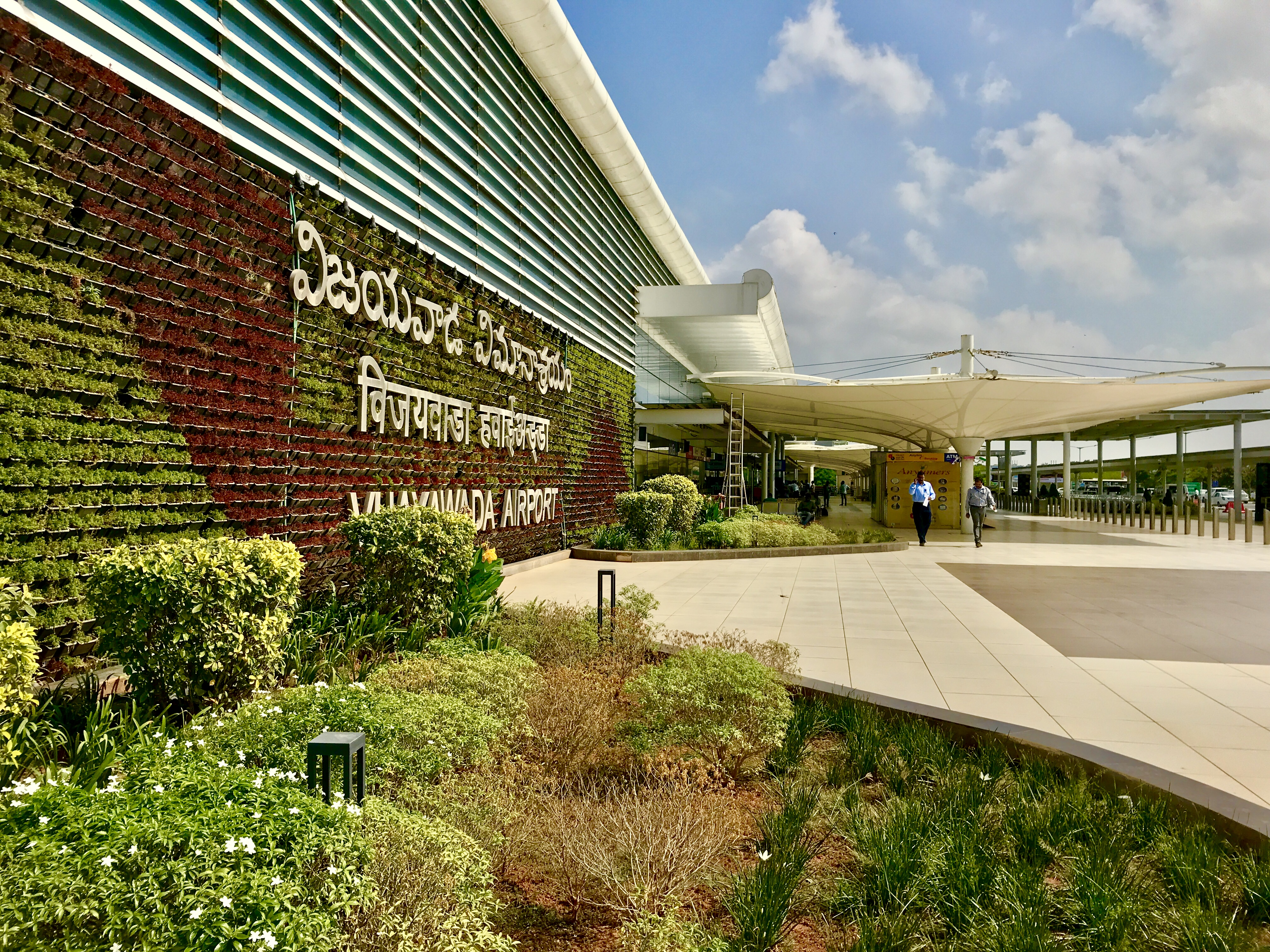
Vijayawada Airport

The Vijayawada Airport at Gannavaram provides air connectivity to major metropolitan cities of the country. On 3 May 2017, Vijayawada Airport was upgraded from Domestic to International status. International Flights started from 4 December 2018 by Indigo Airlines to Singapore. The International Flights to Singapore stopped after 27 June 2019 because the State Government stopped Viability Gap Funding in June 2019 . As of June 2019, it registered a domestic passenger movement growth rate of 70.0% with a total of 11 Lakh 92 Thousand Passengers in FY 19. Aircraft movement recorded a growth of 65.0%.

== Resources ==
Power plants

Kondapalli Estate houses the thermal plant namely Vijayawada Thermal Power Station. It is one of the coal based power plants of the APGENCO. It has a capacity of 1760 MW with 6 units of 210 MW and 1 unit of 500 MW currently under operation. Another power plant in the estate is Lanco Kondapalli Power Ltd., which is a gas based plant with a capacity of 732 MW to serve the power needs of the city and state. Bharat Heavy Electricals Limited (BHEL) in agreement with APGENCO will take up the technology demonstration project plant of 182 MW capacity.

== Tourism ==
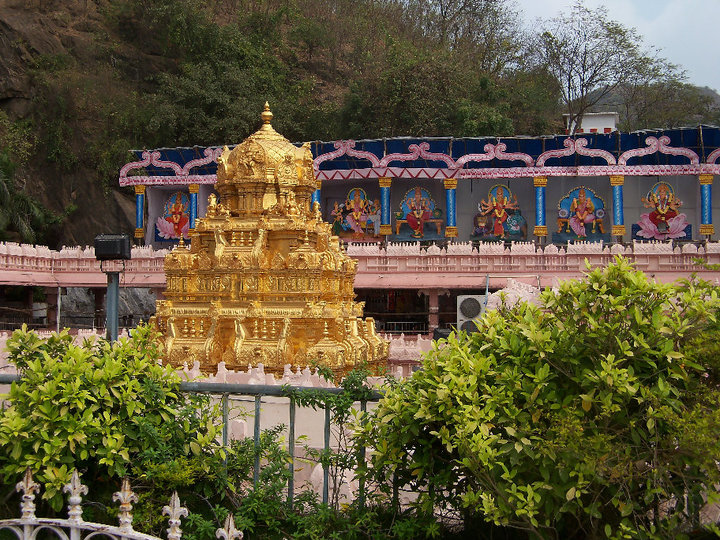
Kanaka Durga Temple, Vijayawada

The important tourism city of Andhra Pradesh after Visakhapatnam is Vijayawada, has certain landmarks and visitor attractions in and around the city such as Prakasam barrage, parks, museums, caves, river island and religious sites etc.

In 2024, the Government of Andhra Pradesh introduced the Andhra Pradesh Tourism Policy 2024 - 2029, which aims to attract an investment of ₹25,000 crore over five years

== Real estate ==
The growing population and economy have resulted in rising real estate prices. Real-estate companies are building housing projects in the city outskirts with many residential townships.
