= Parigi =

Parigi may refer to:

== Places ==
=== India ===
- Parigi, Vikarabad district, Telangana
- Parigi, Sri Sathya Sai district, Andhra Pradesh

=== Indonesia ===
- Parigi Moutong Regency, a regency of Central Sulawesi
- Parigi, South Sulawesi, a district in Gowa Regency
- Parigi, Southeast Sulawesi, a district in Muna Regency
- Parigi, West Java, in Pangandaran Regency

=== Other countries ===
- Paris (Italian: 'Parigi'), France, the twin town of Rome, Italy
- Parigi, Felino, Italy
- Parigi, Iran

== People ==
- Alfonso Parigi (1606-1656), Italian architect and scenographer, the son of Giulio Parigi
- Alfonso Parigi the Elder (died 1590), Italian architect and designer working in Florence for the Grand Duke of Tuscany
- Giacomo Parigi (born 1996), Italian footballer
- Giulio Parigi (1571-1635), Italian architect and designer
- Jean-François Parigi (born 1960), French politician
- Susanna Parigi (born 1961), Italian singer, songwriter, pianist and author
- Valentina Parigi, Italian physicist
- Parigi Coppelletti (fl. 1590s), Italian painter

== Other ==
- "Parigi", a 2022 song by Alfa
