= Kondapalli railway station =

Railway station in Andhra Pradesh

Kondapalli

General information
- Location: Near NH-30, Kondapalli, Vijayawada, NTR District - 521228; India
- Coordinates: 16.37°N 80.33°E
- System: Indian Railways station
- Owner: Indian Railways
- Operator: South Central Railway
- Line: Kazipet-Vijayawada section
- Platforms: 2
- Tracks: 7

Construction
- Structure type: On Ground

Other information
- Status: Functional
- Station code: KI
- Zone(s): South Central Railway
- Division(s): Vijayawada

History
- Opened: 1916; 110 years ago

Services
Preceding station	Indian Railways	Following station
Cheruvu Madhavaram towards Warangal	New Delhi–Chennai main line	Rayanapadu towards Vijayawada
Location
- Location within India Location within Andhra Pradesh

Kondapalli railway station (station code - KI) is an Indian Railways station in Kondapalli, Vijayawada of Andhra Pradesh. It lies on Kazipet - Vijayawada section of New Delhi - Chennai main line. It is administered under Vijayawada railway division of the South Central Railway zone. It is used as a satellite station to reduce congestion of the rail traffic on Vijayawada Junction.

== Location ==
This station is located in Kondapalli, industrial suburban of Vijayawada situated towards west side of the City. Localities like Ibrahimpatnam, Kondapalli, NTPS Vijayawada colonies(A, B, C Colonies) are accessible from this station.

== Transport ==
APSRTC operates bus services connecting Kondapalli Railway Station with Vijayawada city and surrounding areas.

Route number	Start	End	Via
201	Kondapalli Railway Station	PNBS (Pandit Nehru Bus Station)	Kondapalli Railway Station, Pnbs
202	Kondapalli Railway Station	Benz Circle	Kondapalli Railway Station, Pnbs, Benz Circle
203	Kondapalli Railway Station	Autonagar Bus Stand	Kondapalli Railway Station, Pnbs, Benz Circle, Patamata, Autonagar Bus Stand
204	Kondapalli Railway Station	Kaleswararao Market	Kondapalli Railway Station, Old Bus Stand, Kaleswararao Market
205	Kondapalli Railway Station	Vijayawada Railway Station	Kondapalli Railway Station, Pnbs, Railway Station

== Classification ==
In terms of earnings and outward passengers handled, Kondapalli is categorized as a Non-Suburban Grade-6 (NSG-6) railway station. Based on the re–categorization of Indian Railway stations for the period of 2017–18 and 2022–23, an NSG–6 category station earns nearly ₹1 crore and handles close to 1 million passengers.

Train no.	Train name	Type	End points
17406/17405	Krishna Express	Express	Tirupati Main<−>Adilabad
17202/17201	Golconda Express	Express	Guntur<−>Secunderabad
12749/12750	Machilipatnam Express	Express	Bidar<−>Machilipatnam

Passenger MEMU & DEMU trains:

- Mahbubabad-Vijayawada Passenger
- Bhadrachalam-Vijayawada Passenger
- Vijayawada–Dornakal Junction Passenger
- Vijayawada–Kazipet Passenger

== See also ==
- List of railway stations in India

Preceding station	Indian Railways	Following station
Cheruvu Madhavaram towards ?	South Central Railway zone Kazipet–Vijayawada section of Delhi–Chennai line	Rayanapadu towards ?
