= Eastern Power =

Eastern Power may represent:

- Eastern Power Distribution Company, Indian electricity distribution company owned by the Government of Andhra Pradesh
- Eastern Power Networks, British licensed electricity distribution network
- the economic, military or political power of Eastern world

== See also ==
- Eastern alliance
- Eastern bloc
- Eastern world
