= Thimmasamudram =

Thimmasamudram may refer to any of the following places in Andhra Pradesh, India.

- Thimmasamudram, Kadapa
- Thimmasamudram, Prakasam
