= Narla Tata Rao =

- Born: 8 March 1917
- Died: 7 April 2007 (aged 90); Hyderabad, India
- Citizenship: India
- Awards: Padma Shri; Om Prakash Bhasin Award
- Scientific career
- Fields: Electrical engineering

Narla Tata Rao (8 March 1917 – 7 April 2007) was a prominent person in the power sector of India and a former chairman of the Andhra Pradesh State Electricity Board.

== Personal ==
Tata Rao was born on 8 March 1917 in Kavutaram near Gudlavalleru, in Krishna district to a Telugu-speaking Kamma family. After early education in Andhra, he graduated in engineering from Banaras Hindu University in 1941 and obtained an MS in power systems engineering from the Illinois Institute of Technology in Chicago, IL.

Tata Rao built the Madhya Pradesh State Electricity Board from scratch in 1958. The late K.L. Rao appointed him as Member (Thermal) of the Central Water and Power Commission (CWPC) in 1972. However, Jalagam Vengala Rao spared no efforts to get Tata Rao to the state in August 1974. Tata Rao became synonymous with the energy sector in Andhra Pradesh. He increased the installed capacity of the state grid five-fold by conceiving giant generation projects like Vijayawada Thermal Station, Nagarjunasagar, Srisailam and Lower Sileru.

He formed a strong base for the state's electricity sector, which is now considered one of the best in the country. He won several awards at national and international levels, including the Padma Shri (1983).

Former positions:

- Chairman Andhra Pradesh State Electricity Board (1974–88)
- Member (Thermal) Central water & Power Commission (1972–74)
- Vice Chairman, Madhya Pradesh Electricity Board
- Chairman, Committee on Super Thermal Stations. Govt. of India
- Chairman, Energy Research Committee of CSIR, Govt. of India
- Consultant, Asian Development Bank – Reorganisation Bangladesh Power Development Board
- Member, Rajadhyaksha Committee on Power Govt. of India
- Chairman, Expert Group on Development of Power Technology in the Future Planning Commission Govt. of India
- Member, Atomic Power Authority. Govt. of India
- Member, Energy Policy Committee. Govt. of India
- Director, Bharat Heavy Electricals Ltd. Govt. of India
- Director, Andhra Bank Limited
- Director, Bharat Aluminum Co. Ltd. Govt. of India
- Director, Hyderabad Allwyn Metal Works. Govt. of A.P
- Director, A.P Industrial Development Corporation. Govt. of A.P
- Director, M/s Singareni Collieries Co. Ltd. Govt. of A.P
- Director, A.P. Industrial Infrastructure Corporation. Govt. of A.P
- Director, A.P. Non Resident Indian Investment Corporation. Govt. of India
- Director, M/s Southern Transformers & Elec. Ltd. Govt. of A.P
- Director of Gangappa Cables Co. Limited
- Chairman, Lakshmi Porcelains Ltd
- Chairman, Asian Coffee Co. Ltd
- Chairman, Bhasker Palace Hotels Ltd
- President, Central Board of irrigation and Power (1976–78 and 1979)
- Chairman, National Council of Power Utilities (1982–88)
- Member, CIGRE Study Committee No. 37 and 31
- Chairman, Amar Raja Power Systems Limited
- Chairman, VBC Ferro Alloys Co. Ltd
- Director, Ultimo Polymers
- Director, A.P. Paper Mills
- Member, A.P. State Council of Higher Education. Govt. of A.P

== Awards and honours ==
- Padmashri Award from the President of India – 1983
- Andhra Pradesh State Government Award Distinguished Service – April 1981
- Bharat Ratna Sri M. Visveswarayya Award for the year 1985 of insti. Of Engineers and Govt of A.P.
- Om Prakash Bhasin Award of the Year – 1986.
- Golden Jubilee Award of Central Board of Irrigation and Power – 1978
- Scroll of Honour Institute of Engineers - 1986
- Honorary Member, Electrical Engineering Association and General Science Association, Sigma Xi (USA)

== See also ==
- Dr Narla Tata Rao Thermal Power Station
