= Devada =

- Suburb
- Location in Visakhapatnam
- Coordinates: 17.560245°N 83.118207°E
- Country: India
- State: Andhra Pradesh
- District: Visakhapatnam

Languages
  - Official: Telugu
- Time zone: UTC+5:30 (IST)
- PIN: 530031
- Vehicle registration: AP-31,32

Devada is a suburb in Visakhapatnam City, India. It falls under the jurisdiction Pedagantyada mandal of Visakhapatnam Dist and a part of GVMC. It is a part of Pendurthi assembly constituency. It is near the Simhadri Super Thermal Power Station and Vizag Thermal Power Station.
