= Krishnapatnam =

- port town
- Location in Andhra Pradesh, India Krishnapatnam (India)
- Coordinates: 14.283°N 80.117°E
- Country: India
- State: Andhra Pradesh
- Region: Andhra
- District: Nellore

Government
  - Type: Gram panchayat
- Elevation: 5 m (16 ft)

Population (2011)
  - Total: 5,686

Languages
  - Official: Telugu
- Time zone: UTC+5:30 (IST)
- Vehicle registration: AP

Krishnapatnam or Kistnapatam is a port town in Muthukur mandal of Nellore district in Andhra Pradesh, India.

== Demographics ==
As of 2011 Census of India, the town had a population of 5,686. The total population constitute, 2,815 males, 2,871 females and 732 children, in the age group of 0–6 years. The average literacy rate stands at 65.22% with 3,231 literates, significantly lower than the national average of 73.00%.

== Location ==
Hinterland

Vast hinterland covering Southern Andhra Pradesh, Districts of Rayalseema, North Tamil Nadu and Eastern Karnataka Being on Eastern Coast, supports LOOK EAST Exim Trade Policy

== Power projects ==
A 4000 MW UMPP with investment of Rs17,500 Crores is being constructed. Besides this UMPP, APGENCO set up a 1600 MW power station named as Sri Damodaram Sanjeevaiah Thermal Power Station at Krishnapatnam.

== Smart City ==
Nellore shall transform into a smart city with support from Confederation of Indian Industries CII as reported at The Hindu - CII to help Nellore become a smart city
