= Thimmasamudram, Kadapa =

Thimmasamudram
- Village
- Interactive map of Thimmasamudram
- Location in Andhra Pradesh, India Thimmasamudram (India)
- Coordinates: 13.97°N 78.82°E
- Country: India
- State: Andhra Pradesh
- District: Kadapa

Languages
  - Official: Telugu
- Time zone: UTC+5:30 (IST)

Thimmasamudram is a village in T.Sundupalle mandal of Kadapa district in Andhra Pradesh, India. It is on the banks of the Cheyyeru river, a tributary of the Penner River. It is located on the alternative road route from Rayachoti to Piler. Thimmasamudram has a postal area code of 516130. It is across the river bank from T. Sundupalle, and is a gram panchayat.
