= Transmission Corporation of Andhra Pradesh =

Electric power transmission company

Andhra Pradesh Power Transmission Corporation Limited (APTRANSCO)
- Type: Government-owned corporation/Public sector undertaking
- Industry: Electricity transmission
- Predecessor: Andhra Pradesh State Electricity Board (APSEB)
- Founded: 1 February 1999
- Headquarters: Gunadala, Vijayawada, India
- Area served: Andhra Pradesh
- Key people: k.vijayanandh chairman and managing director
- Products: transmission, distribution and energy trading
- Owner: Government of Andhra Pradesh
- Parent: Government of Andhra Pradesh
- Website: http://www.aptransco.gov.in/transco; http://www.apsldc.gov.in/; http://apto.ap.gov.in; http://appower.ap.gov.in;

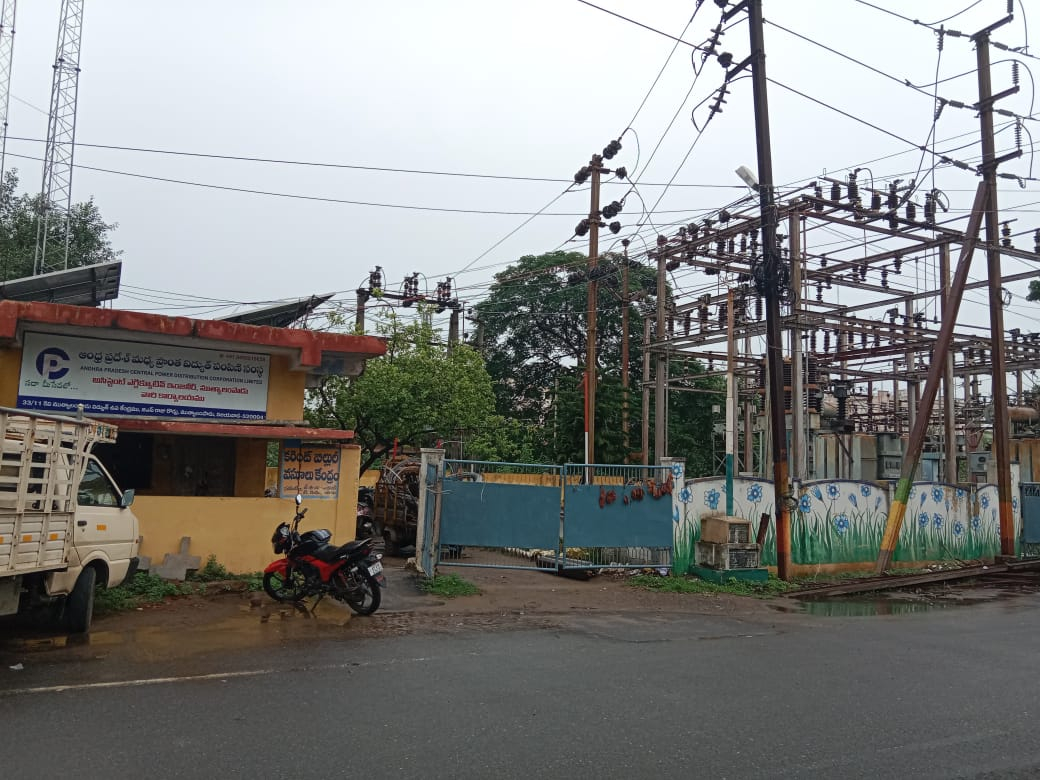
Andhra Pradesh Central Power Distribution Corporation limited, Muthyalampadu, Vijayawada.

The Transmission Corporation of Andhra Pradesh (APTRANSCO) is the electric power transmission company of Andhra Pradesh state in India.

== History ==
The government of Andhra Pradesh enacted the AP Electricity Reforms Act in 1998. As a result, in early 1999 the existing company, APSEB, was unbundled into Andhra Pradesh Power Generation Corporation Limited (APGENCO) and Transmission Corporation of Andhra Pradesh Limited (APTRANSCO). APTRANSCO was further unbundled into "Transmission Corporation" and four "Distribution Companies" (DISCOMS).

== Current role ==
From February 1999 to June 2005 APTRANSCO was the single buyer of electrical power in the state, purchasing power from generators and selling it to DISCOMs in accordance with the terms and conditions of the individual power purchase agreements (PPAs) at bulk supply tariff rates. Subsequently, in accordance with the Third Transfer Scheme notified by GoAP, APTRANSCO has ceased power trading but has retained control of power transmission system operations.

== Performance ==
APTRANSCO and DISCOMs owned and operated transmission lines from 400 kV to 11 kV are 231,127 circuit kilometres excluding the HT lines owned and operated by Power Grid Corporation of India in the state. The spread of high voltage transmission lines (≥ 11 kV) is such that it can form a square matrix of area 1.93 km^{2} (i.e. on average, at least one HT line within 0.7 km vicinity) in 160,205 km^{2} total area of the state. DISCOMs owned and operated LT lines (below 11 kV) are 292,158 circuit kilometres. Therefore, there are at least one HT or LT line availability on average within the vicinity of 306 meters in the entire state. However, to 31 July 2015, the maximum peak load met was only 6847 MW, and the annual energy supplied was 48,323 million kWh during the year 2014-15. The huge installed capacity of the transmission network and the substations is being underutilised with a low demand factor.

== See also ==
- Transmission system performance parameters
- Power sector of Andhra Pradesh
- Andhra Pradesh Power Generation Corporation Limited
- Availability-based tariff
- HVDC Sileru–Barsoor
