= Sri Damodaram Sanjeevaiah Thermal Power Station =

Power station in India

Sri Damodaram Sanjeevaiah ultra mega super critical Thermal Power Station
- Country: India
- Location: Nellore, Andhra Pradesh
- Coordinates: 14.31°N 80.10°E
- Status: Under Construction
- Construction cost: ₹84,322.0 million (US$880 million)
- Owner: Andhra Pradesh Power Development Company Limited (APPDCL)
- Operator: APGENCO

Thermal power station
- Primary fuel: Coal

Power generation
- Units operational: 3 × 800 MW = 2400 MW Ultra mega super critical Thermal Power Station-APPDCL
- Nameplate capacity: 2400 MW

Sri Damodaram Sanjeevaiah Thermal Power Station is located in Nelatur Village, near Krishnapatnam, Muthukur mandal and at a distance of 23 km from Nellore city of Andhra Pradesh. The power plant is one of the coal-based power plants of Andhra Pradesh Power Development Company Limited (APPDCL). It is the Special Purpose Vehicle (SPV), a joint venture company of APGENCO (with 50% equity) and IL AND FS (50% equity) partnership.

The proposed capacity of plant is 1600 MW. The project is under construction and likely to be completed by the end of 2014. The Power station is designed for blended coal in the ratio of 70% washed domestic coal from Talcher Coalfield to 30% imported coal. Sea water is proposed for cooling purpose and potable water by desalination. Krishnapatnam port (about 5 km from site) will cater to the requirement of importing heavy machinery and both domestic & imported coal of 3.5 and 1.5 million tons per annum respectively. EPC contract for the main plant has been awarded to BHEL, L&T and Tata Projects Limited during July 2008 and for BOP during February 2009. The estimated complete cost of project is about Rs 8432/- Crores. The Debt & Equity ratio is 80:20 and Project is being financed by PFC and KfW, Germany.

== Etymology ==
In view of the exemplary Statesmanship and dedicated services rendered to the state by late Sri. Damodaram Sanjeevaiah, Former Chief Minister of Andhra Pradesh, the Govt. of Andhra Pradesh ordered ∃∈${{math|{{mvar|}}}}$1600 MW Thermal Power Project proposed to be named as "Sri.Damodaram Sanjeevaiah Thermal Power Station".

== Capacity ==
Stage	Unit Number	Installed Capacity (MW)	Date of Commissioning	Status
I	1	800	31 March 2014	Operational
I	2	800	16 December 2014	Operational
II	1	800	Work Started	EPC contracted to TATA, Boiler and Turbine Generator Contract to BHEL
