= Veeraballi =

- Village
- Interactive map of Veeraballi
- Location in Andhra Pradesh, India
- Coordinates: 14°9′20″N 78°51′25″E
- Country: India
- State: Andhra Pradesh
- District: Kadapa

Population (2011)
  - Total: 7,643

Languages
  - Official: Telugu
- Time zone: UTC+5:30 (IST)
- PIN: 516268
- Telephone code: 08561
- Vehicle registration: AP-04
- Nearest city: Rayachoti
- Sex ratio: 1.08 ♂/♀
- Literacy: 75%
- Lok Sabha constituency: Rajampeta
- Vidhan Sabha constituency: Rajampeta

Veeraballi is a village in Kadapa district of the Indian state of Andhra Pradesh. It is located in Veeraballi mandal of Rajampeta revenue division.

== Population ==
As of 2001 census, there were 1847 households with a total population of 7643 in the village of Veeraballi. Of the population, 3676 are females, and 3967 are males.
