= T. Sundupalle =

T.Sundupalle
- Mandal
- Interactive map of T.Sundupalle
- Location in Andhra Pradesh, India
- Coordinates: 13°58′58″N 78°54′58″E
- Country: India
- State: Andhra Pradesh
- District: Kadapa
- Talukas: Rajampeta

Languages
  - Official: Telugu
- Time zone: UTC+5:30 (IST)
- PIN: 516130
- Vehicle registration: AP

T. Sundupalle is a village in Kadapa district of Andhra Pradesh state, India. It is the headquarter of T.Sundupalle mandal as per Rajampeta revenue division. Pincha dam is located at Mudumpadu village . Sangameswara temple is located at Mittameedapalle at the conflux of Pincha and Bahuda rivers.
