= Cheruvu Madhavaram =

- Village
- Interactive map of Cheruvu Madhavaram
- Location in Andhra Pradesh, India Cheruvu Madhavaram (India)
- Coordinates: 16.693222°N 80.547999°E
- Country: India
- State: Andhra Pradesh
- District: NTR

Area –
  - Total: 4.44 km^{2} (1.71 sq mi)
- Elevation: 24 m (79 ft)

Population (2011)
  - Total: 2,912
  - Density: 656/km^{2} (1,700/sq mi)

Languages
  - Official: Telugu
- Time zone: UTC+5:30 (IST)
- PIN: 521229
- Vehicle registration: AP-16
- Nearest city: Vijayawada
- Lok Sabha constituency: Vijayawada
- Vidhan Sabha constituency: Mylavaram

Cheruvu Madhavaram is a village located in the G. Konduru mandal, NTR district of the Indian state of Andhra Pradesh. It is under the administration of Vijayawada revenue division.
