= Ramagiri, Sri Sathya Sai district =

Ramagiri
- Village
- Interactive map of Ramagiri
- Location in Andhra Pradesh, India
- Coordinates: 14.3000°N 77.5000°E
- Country: India
- State: Andhra Pradesh
- District: Sri Sathya Sai
- Talukas: Ramagiri
- Elevation: 516 m (1,693 ft)

Population (2001)
  - Total: 31,474

Languages
  - Official: Telugu
- Time zone: UTC+5:30 (IST)

Ramagiri is a village in Sri Sathya Sai district of the Indian state of Andhra Pradesh. It is the mandal headquarters of Ramagiri mandal in Dharmavaram revenue division.

== Geography ==
Ramagiri is located at 14.3000°N 77.5000°E. It has an average elevation of 516 metres (1,696 ft).

== Demographics ==
According to Indian census, 2001, the demographic details of Ramagiri mandal is as follows:

- Total Population: 31,474 in 6,740 Households
- Male Population: 16,269 and Female Population: 15,205
- Children Under 6-years of age: 4, 199 (Boys – 2,173 and Girls - 2,026)
- Total Literates: 15,226

According to Indian Census 2011, the demographics of Ramagiri village are as following:

- Total population – 3778 (among them male population is 1933 and female population is 1845)
- Total age group of children between 0–6 years – 369 (among them boys are 189 and girls are 180)

== Panchayats ==
The following is the list of village panchayats in Ramagiri mandal. Polepalli, Kuntimaddi, Ganthemarri, Ramagiri, Nasanakota, MotarchinthaPalli, Kondapuram, Peruru, Dubbarlapalli.
