= Parigi Coppelletti =

Italian painter

- Born: Reggio Emilia, Italy
- Occupation: Painter
- Years active: 1590s
- Known for: Fresco painting
- Notable work: Facade for the Basilica della Ghiara (Reggio Emilia); altarpiece of Sant'Agostino, Reggio Emilia (St Nicolo da Tolentino with angelic choir)

Parigi Coppelletti or Copelleti (Active in 1590s) was an Italian painter.

== Life ==
Born in Reggio Emilia, he was active mainly in fresco. For the Basilica della Ghiara (whose construction only started 1597), he painted a facade (dell Occa). For the church of Sant'Agostino, Reggio Emilia, he painted a St Nicolo da Tolentino with angelic choir.
