= Kondapalli =

Suburb in Andhra Pradesh, India

- Town
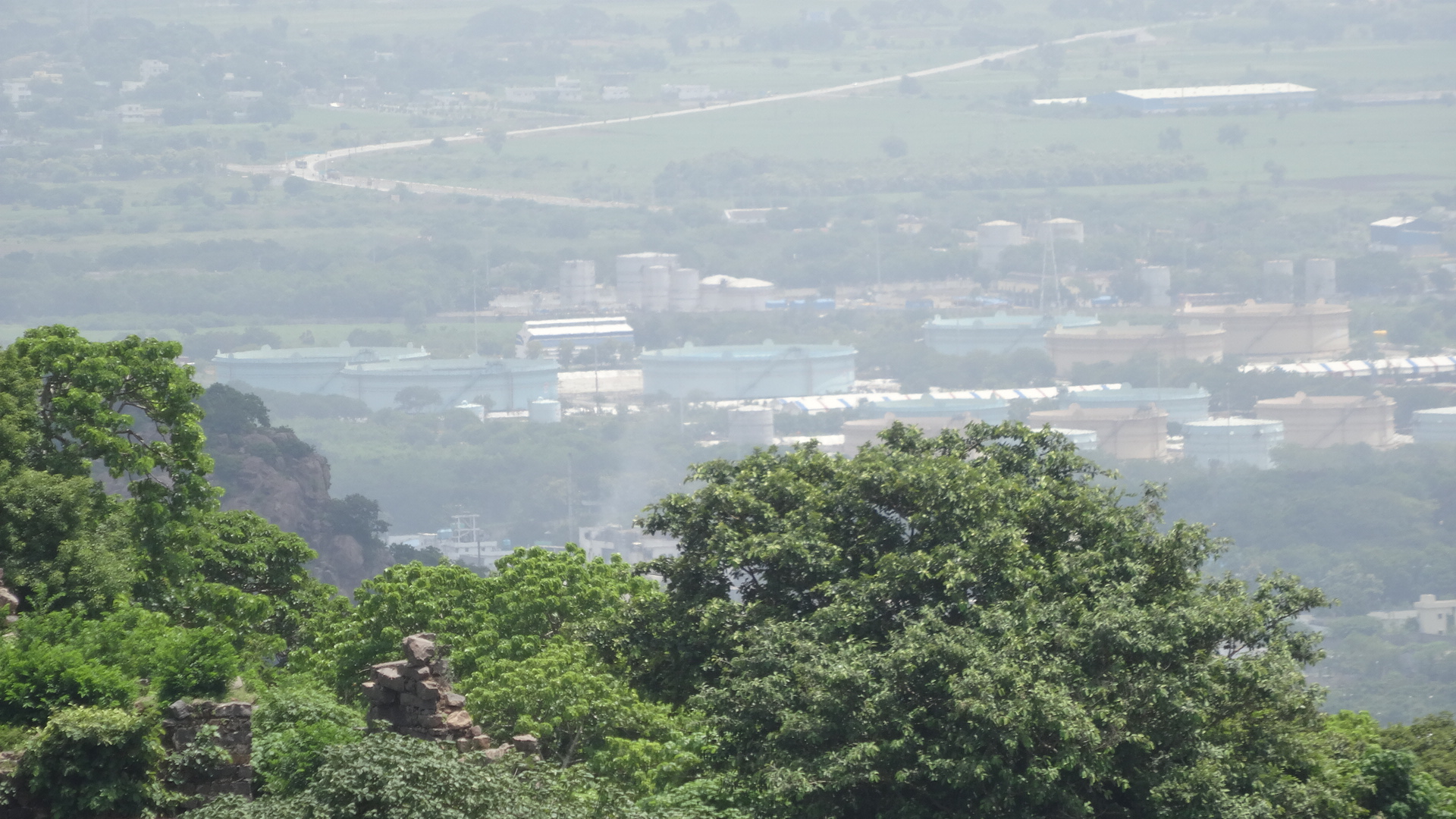
- Kondapalli aerial view
- Interactive map of Kondapalli
- Location in Andhra Pradesh, India
- Coordinates: 16°37′06″N 80°32′28″E
- Country: India
- State: Andhra Pradesh
- Region: Coastal Andhra
- District: NTR
- Mandal: Ibrahimpatnam
- City: Vijayawada

Government
  - Type: Mayor-council
  - Body: Kondapalli Municipality

Area
  - Total: 30.00 km^{2} (11.58 sq mi)

Population (2011)
  - Total: 33,373
  - Density: 1,112/km^{2} (2,881/sq mi)

Languages
  - Official: Telugu
- Time zone: UTC+5:30 (IST)
- PIN: 521228
- Telephone code: +91-866
- Vehicle registration: AP-16

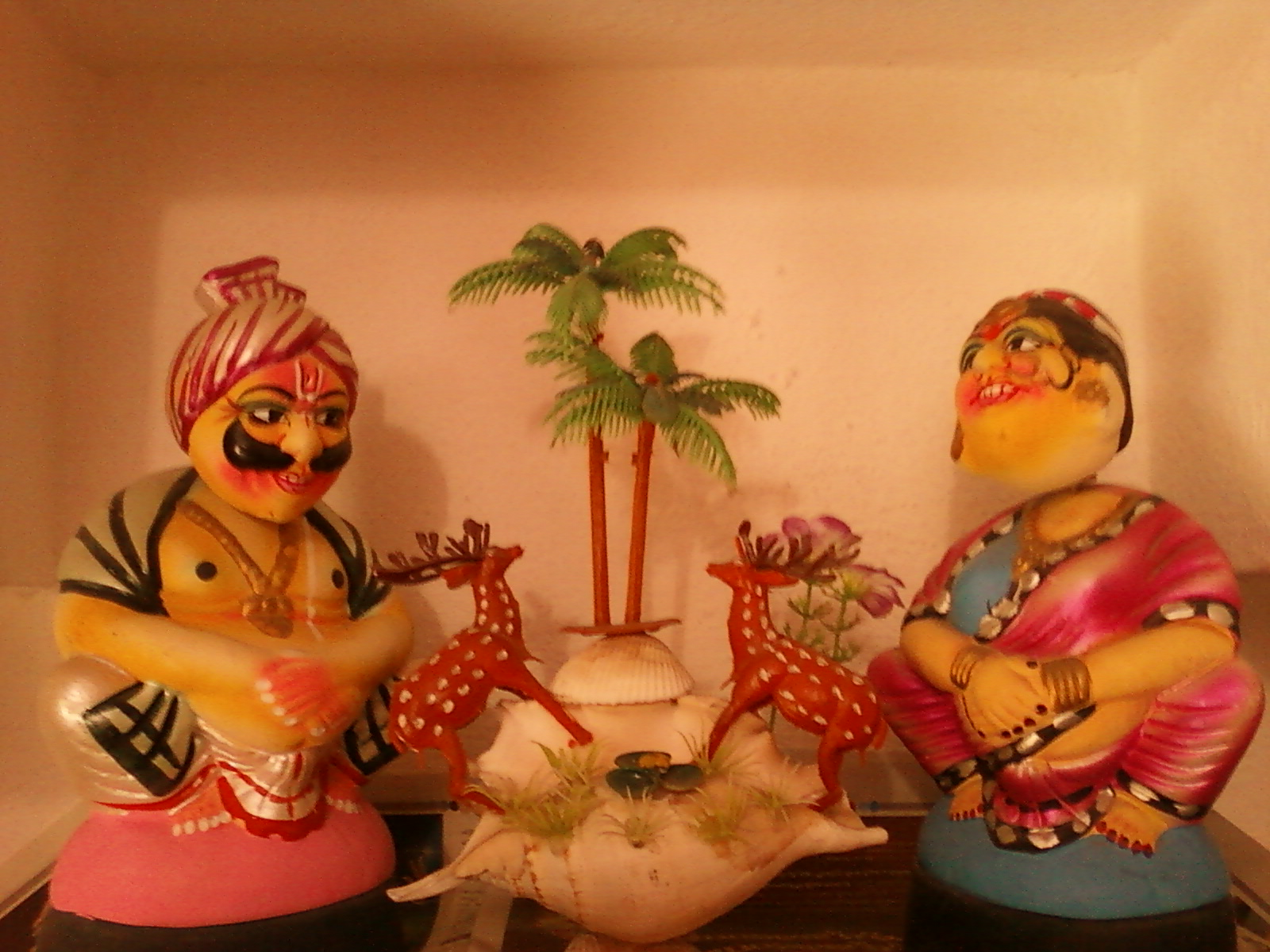
Kondapalli toys at a house in Vijayawada

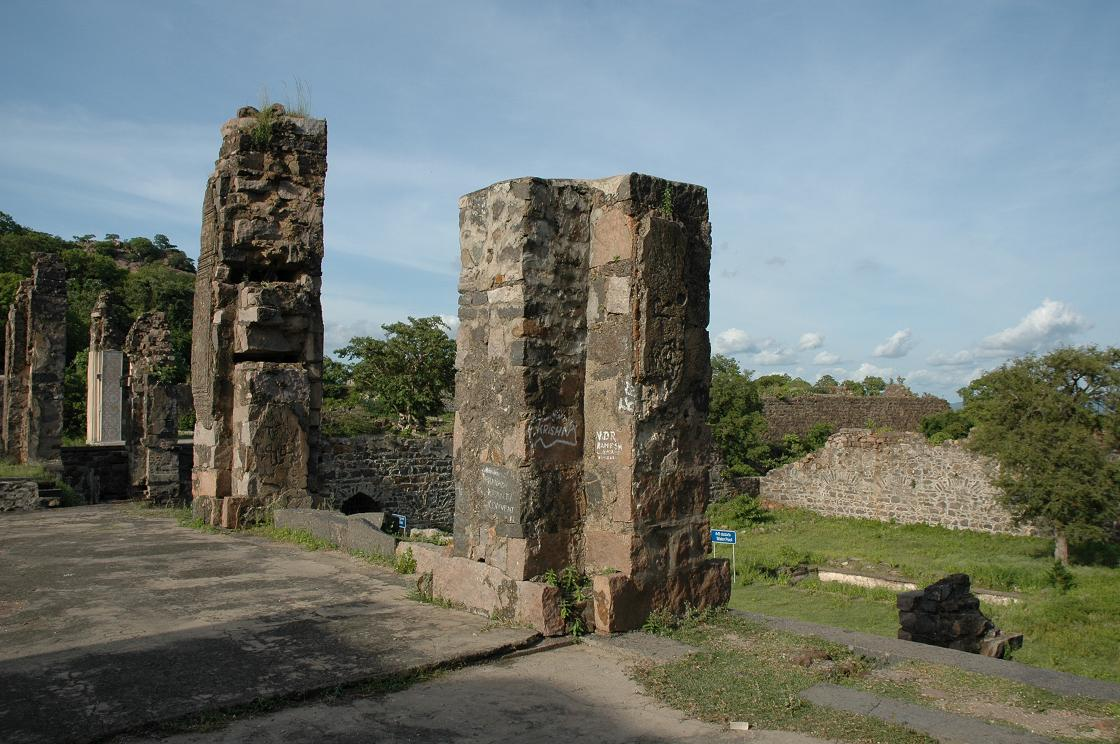
Forecourt of the fort

Kondapalli is a municipality located in NTR district, Andhra Pradesh, India. Kondapalli has many industries. It is located towards the western direction from Vijayawada. The Dr Narla Tata Rao Thermal Power Station also known as Vijayawada Thermal Power Station (VTPS) is one of the major Thermal Power stations of the state is located in between Ibrahimpatnam and Kondapalli. It is host for many industries like Andhra Pradesh Heavy Machinery & Engineering Limited (APHMEL), BPCL, HPCL, IOC, Reliance Industries, Lanco Infratech are located here.

Kondapalli Toys are very famous in the state. Kondapalli Fort, also known as Kondapalli Kota, is located towards west of Kondapalli. The closest locality to Kondapalli is Ibrahimpatnam.

== Etymology ==
In 18th century, Kondapalli was known with the name, Mustafanagar.

== Culture ==
The village is known for Kondapalli Toys (Kondapalli bommalu). The toys are chiselled from local light softwoods (Tella Poniki) and painted with vegetable dyes, and vibrant enamel colours. They are made by local wooden and lay artisans. The most popular toys include Dasavatarams (ten incarnations of Lord Vishnu) elephants with Ambari, palanquin-bearers carrying the bride and bridegroom, toddy tapper, set of village craftsmen, as well as various animals. The papier mache swinging doll is a favourite with many.

== Flora and fauna ==
Kondapalli is home to the Kondapalli Reserve Forest one of the last remaining pristine forests in the Krishna district, spread over an area of 30,000 acres (120 km^{2}). It is home to several leopards, wild dogs, jackals, wild boar, and wolves with a varied topography. A zoological park was also planned by the state government at the village.

== Economy ==
Kondapalli is an industrial suburb of Vijayawada. It has one of the largest industrial estates (industrial parks) in Andhra Pradesh, spread over 450 acres (1.8 km^{2}) and supporting over 800 industrial enterprises. Second largest wagon workshop of Indian Railways is present in Rayanapadu (Guntupalli) about 3 km (1.9 mi) from Kondapalli. In addition to a 1760 MW Dr Narla Tata Rao Thermal Power Station (NTTPs) and 368.144 MW gas based Lanco power plant which is under expansion to 768.144 MW are located here. Andhra Pradesh Heavy Machinery & Engineering Limited (APHMEL) factory is present in Kondapalli. Kondapalli is hub for storage, bottling and transportation of petroleum products of all major companies. Major companies having a presence in Kondapalli include BPCL, GAIL, HPCL, IOC, Reliance Industries, and Lanco Infratech.

== Transport ==
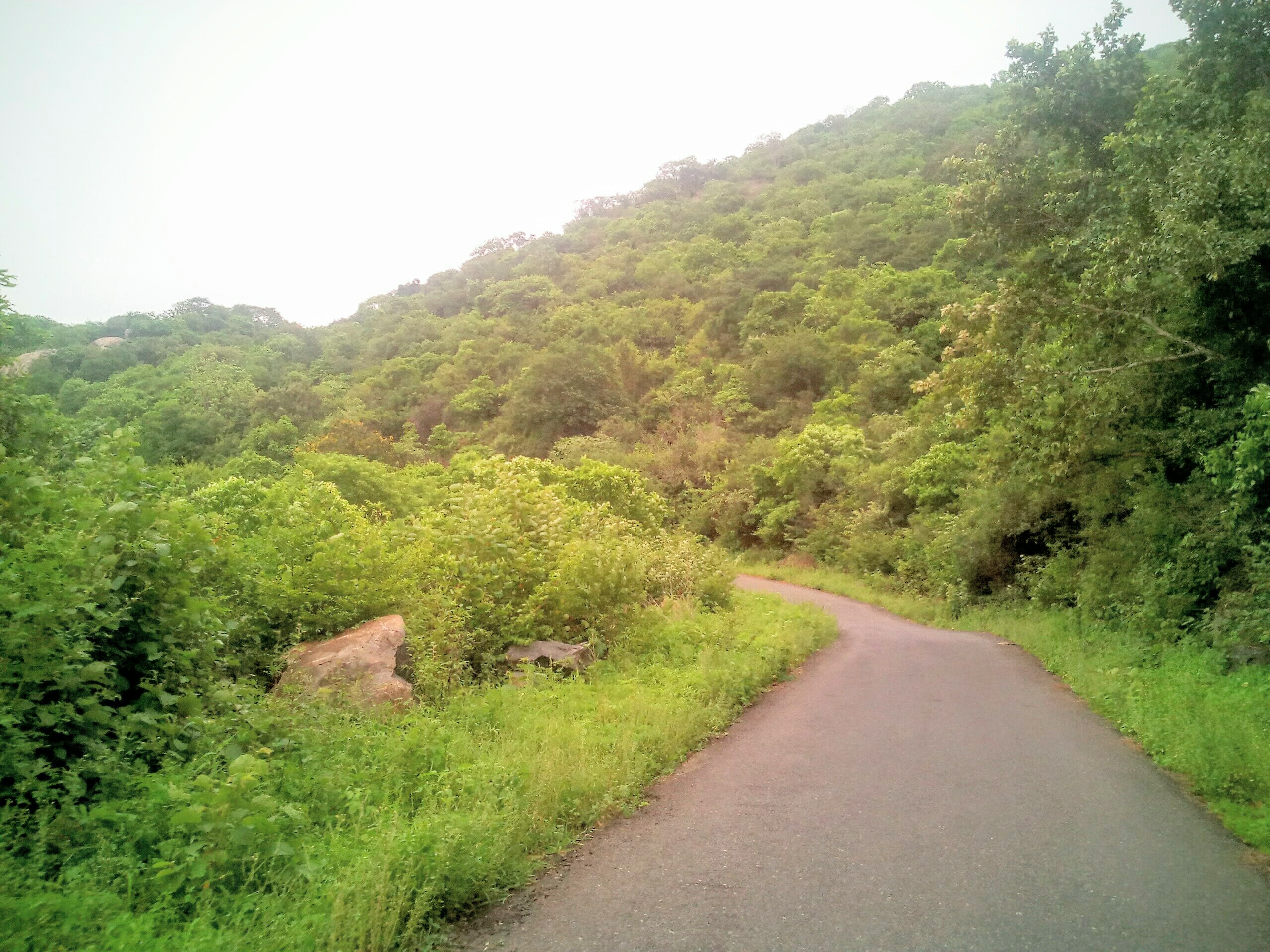
Kondapalli ghat road

Kondapalli railway station is located on Kazipet–Vijayawada section, administered under Vijayawada railway division of South Central Railway zone. NH 30 passes through the town, which connects Vijayawada with Uttarakhand. APSRTC operates city buses from Kondapalli to other places of the city.

APSRTC City Bus Routes

Route number	Start	End	Via
144	Kondapalli	Auto Nagar	Ibrahimpatam, Gollapuri, City Terminal, Governorpet, M.G Road, Libbipet, Benz circle, Patamata
145	Kondapalli	Nidamanuru	Ibrahimpatnam, Gollapuri, City Terminal, Maruthinagar, gunadala, Ramavarapadu, Nidamanuru,
145G	Kondapalli Railway Station	Gannavaram	Kondapalli Railway Station, City Terminal, Gunadala, Ramavarapadu, Prasadampadu, Enkepadu, Nidamanuru, Kesarapalli, Gannavaram
150	Kondapalli	Kankipadu	Ibrahimpatam, Gollapuri, City Terminal, Governorpet, M.G Road, Libbipet, Benz circle, Patamata, Tadigadapa, Penamaluru
188	Kondapalli Railway Station	Gannavaram	Kondapalli Railway Station, Ibrahim patnam, City Terminal, Gunadala, Ramavarappadu, Gannavaram Centre Bus Stop
200	Kondapalli Khilla	City Terminal	Kondapalli Railway Station, Ibrahim patnam, City Terminal

== Education ==
The primary and secondary school education is imparted by government, aided and private schools, under the School Education Department of the state. The medium of instruction followed by different schools are English and Telugu.

== See also ==
- List of census towns in Andhra Pradesh
