= Gautami Combined Cycle Power Plant =

Gautami Combined Cycle Power Plant is located at Peddapuram in Kakinada district in state of Andhra Pradesh. The power plant is one of the gas-based power plants of GVK Group.

In Jun 2003, GVK secured an amended 15yr PPA with APDISCOM for the Gautami project not far from Jegurupadu in Peddapuram, Kakinada district. Financial closure was in Mar 2004. The project was originally developed by Satyam Construction Co (later acquired by Nagarjuna Construction) with Maytas Infra and IJM (India) Infrastructure Ltd. GVK successively bought out most of the Nagarjuna stake and is the controlling shareholder. Equipment was ordered on a turnkey basis from Alstom in Jul 2004 for €180mn. Construction was started with completion expected in Jun 2006. In the event, Gautami did not commission until Jun 2009. The original budget was about Rs1300 Cr and the plant came in at Rs1450 cr. Gautami has a Ground Support Agreement with GAIL for the term of the PPA. In May 2010, GVK awarded a contract to a consortium including Siemens, Hyundai, and L&T for two 392-MW blocks to extend Gautami. These blocks are expected to cost Rs3,200cr

== Capacity ==
The power plant has installed capacity of 469 MW.
