= Kondapalli Reserve Forest =

Geography
- Location: Krishna district, Andhra Pradesh, India

Kondapalli Reserve Forest is a reserved forest in the Krishna district of the Indian state of Andhra Pradesh. It is spread over an area of 30,000 acres (120 km^{2}) and is under the protection of Andhra Pradesh Forest Department.

== Fauna ==
The forest is home to several carnivorous animals like, leopards, wild dogs and a few others like, jackals, wolves, civet cats as well. The herbivorous animals in the forest include, wild boars, sambar deer, chital, barking deer, rhesus monkey and four-horned antelopes. Birds such as peacocks.

== Flora ==
Tella poniki softwood is found in the forest which is useful in making the Kondapalli Toys.
