= Rayalaseema Thermal Power Station =

Power station in Andhra Pradesh, India

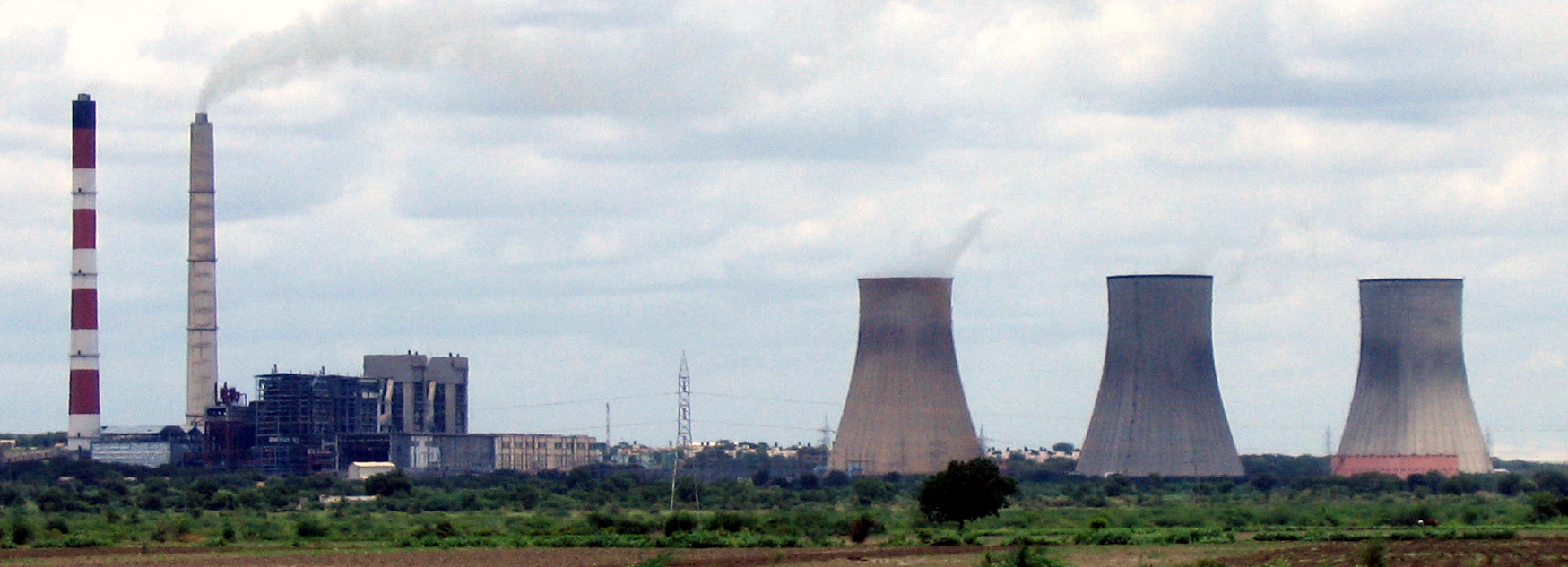
- Country: India
- Location: Kadapa, Kadapa, Andhra Pradesh
- Coordinates: 14.70°N 78.46°E
- Status: Operational
- Commission date: Unit 1: 31 March 1994; Unit 2: 25 February 1995; Unit 3: 25 January 2007; Unit 4: 20 November 2007; Unit 5: 14 March 2018
- Operator: APGENCO

Thermal power station
- Primary fuel: Coal

Power generation
- Units operational: 5 X 210 MW and 1 × 600 MW
- Nameplate capacity: 1650 MW

External links
- Commons: Related media on Commons

Rayalaseema Thermal Power Station is located at Yerraguntla, Kadapa district in Andhra Pradesh. The power plant is one of the coal based power plants of APGENCO.

== Capacity ==
The thermal power station has a capacity of 1650 MW; 5 units of 210 MW each and 1 unit of 600 MW.

Phase	Installed Capacity (MW)	Date of Commissioning	Status
I	2X210	1994	Commissioned
II	2X210	2007	Commissioned
III	1X210	2010	Commissioned
IV	1X600	2018	Commissioned

== Power Plant ==
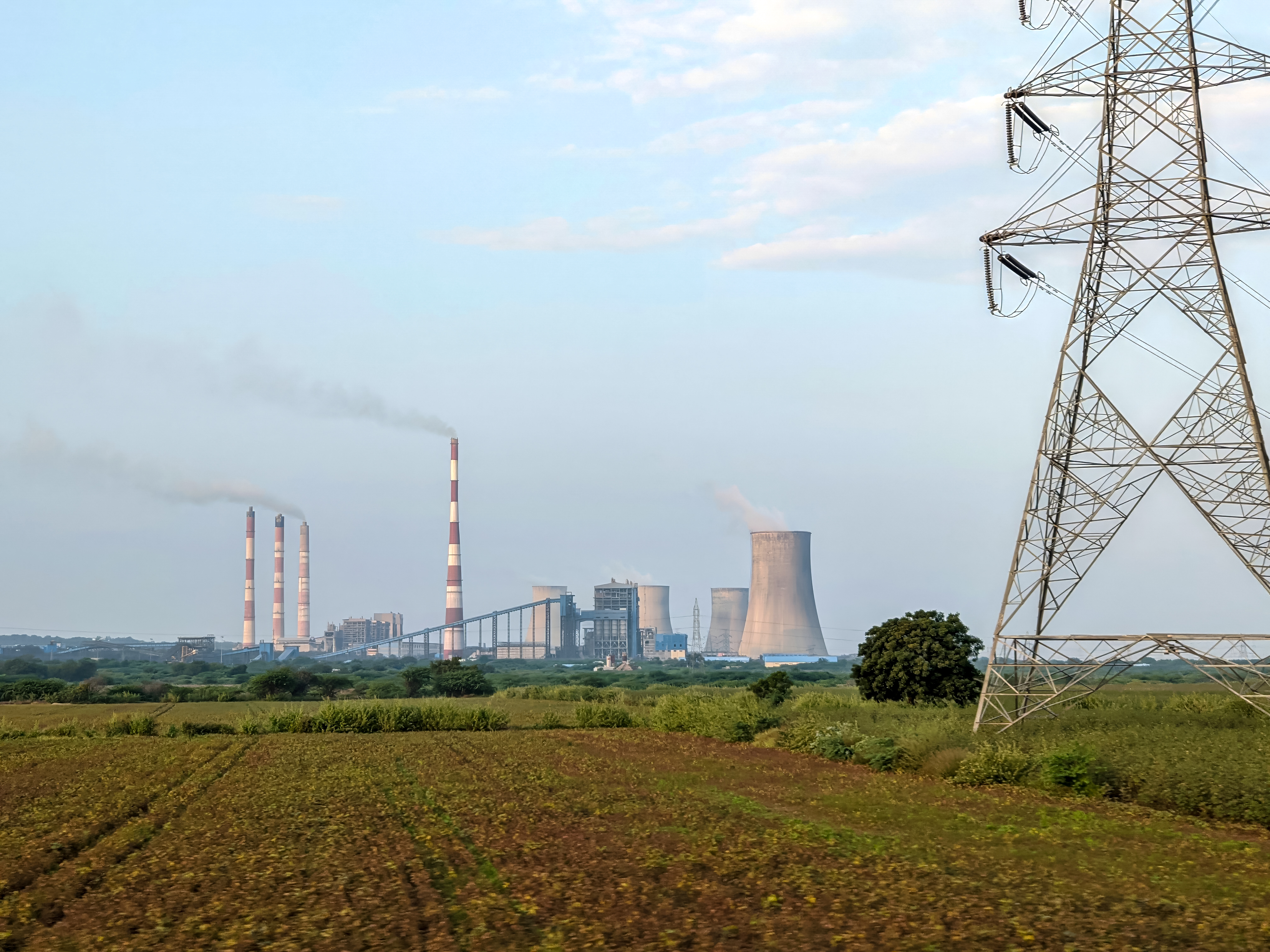
Rayalaseema in 2022

Rayalaseema Thermal Power Plant was developed under 3 stages namely stage I, II, III and IV. The station is performing well in the recent years by achieving high plant load factor. It stood first in country during 1998–99, 2002–03, 2003–04 and second during 1999–2000, 2001–02. The station has received meritorious productivity awards for six consecutive years and incentive award for seven consecutive years. BHEL commissioned stage IV unit 1×600 MW in March 2018 leading to total installed capacity of RTPP to 1650 MW.
