= Dr. Narla Tata Rao Thermal Power Station =

Building in India

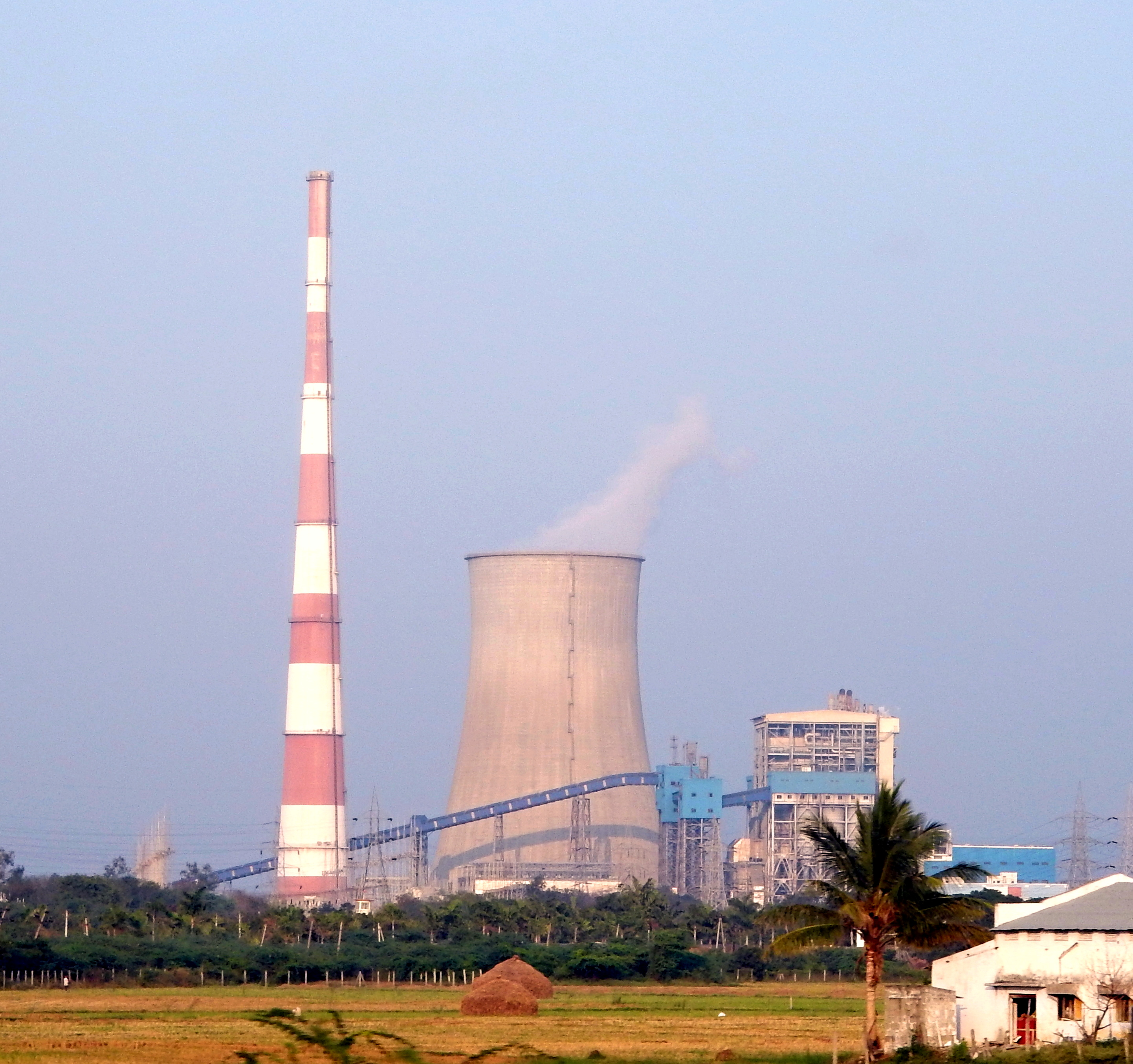
- Narla Tata Rao Power Station in January 2015
- Country: India
- Location: Vijayawada, Andhra Pradesh
- Coordinates: 16.5907°N 80.5332°E
- Status: Operational
- Commission date: Unit 1: 1 November 1979; Unit 2: 10 October 1980; Unit 3: 5 October 1980; Unit 4: 23 August 1990; Unit 5: 31 March 1994; Unit 6: 24 February 1995; Unit 7: 6 April 2009; Unit 8: 19 December 2023
- Operator: APGENCO

Thermal power station
- Primary fuel: Coal

Power generation
- Units operational: 6 X 210 MW; 1 X 500 MW; 1 X 800 MW
- Nameplate capacity: 2560.00 MW

External links
- Commons: Related media on Commons

Dr. Narla Tata Rao Thermal Power Station or Vijayawada Thermal Power Plant is located at Vijayawada in Andhra Pradesh. It is named after Narla Tata Rao, the erstwhile chairman of the Andhra Pradesh State Electricity board. The power plant is one of the coal-based power plants of APGENCO. It is placed between Ibrahimpatnam and Kondapalli villages.

== Power Plant ==
Dr Narla Tata Rao Thermal Power Plant is also known as Vijayawada Thermal Power Plant. It was developed under 4 stages, with the project cost of Rs 193 Crores and Rs 511 Crores respectively.

Again with an investment of RS 840 Crores 2 units were commissioned under III Stage.

The seventh unit of 500 MW was commissioned in 2009.

The station stood first in country during 94–95, 95–96, 96–97, 97-98 and 2001-02 by achieving the highest plant load factor.

The station has received many prestigious awards from various organisations. The station has received Meritorious Productivity Awards for 21 consecutive years and Incentive awards for 12 consecutive years.

== Capacity ==
The plant has present capacity of 2560 MW.

Stage	Unit number	Installed capacity (MW)	Date of commissioning	Status
Stage I	1	210	01-11-1979	Running.
Stage I	2	210 max	10-10-1980	Running.
Stage II	3	210 max	05-10-1989	Running
Stage II	4	210 max	23-08-1990	Running
Stage III	5	210 max	31-03-1994	Running
Stage III	6	210 max	24-02-1995	Running
Stage IV	7	500 max	06-04-2009	Running
Stage V	8	800	20-12-2023	Running

== See also ==
- Andhra Pradesh Power Generation Corporation
- Power sector of Andhra Pradesh
