= Parigi, Sri Sathya Sai district =

Parigi
- Village
- Interactive map of Parigi
- Location in Andhra Pradesh, India
- Coordinates: 13°53′34″N 77°27′35″E
- Country: India
- State: Andhra Pradesh
- District: Sri Sathya Sai
- Talukas: Parigi
- Elevation: 624 m (2,047 ft)

Population (2011)
  - Total: 12,614

Languages
  - Official: Telugu
- Time zone: UTC+5:30 (IST)

Parigi is a village in Sri Sathya Sai district in the state of Andhra Pradesh in India.

== Demographics ==
According to Indian census, 2001, the demographic details of Parigi mandal is as follows:

- Total Population: 52,852 in 11,187 Households
- Male Population: 27,287 and Female Population: 25,565
- Children Under 6-years of age: 7,339 (Boys – 3,816 and Girls – 3,523)
- Total Literates: 25,650

== Geography ==
Parigi is located at 13.9069°N 77.4572°E. It has an average elevation of 624 m (2,047 ft).

Parigi is a Mandal in Andhra Pradesh and is the headquarters for a few villages around it. It is around 8 km (5.0 mi) from Hindupur and 35 km (22 mi) from Lepakshi. 350 years ago its name was Bhanupuri Kota. Parigi cheruvu (an irrigation tank) is one of the biggest irrigation tanks in the Sri Sathya Sai district.

Parigi is on the border of Karnataka is 5 km (3.1 mi) to Karnataka on the north and south and it is a 40-minute drive to Pavagada Taluk (Known for the Shaneshwara Temple) in the Tumkur district of Karnataka.

Research is being done to know historical significance by reading ancient inscriptions found surroundings of parigi village near pannadamma temple of parigi village, and a copper plate document of Adhembhatta a purohit of Penukonda. Those three copper plates are now in Chennai Museum. According to the research, The inscription is in Sanskrit, the script employed being old Telugu- Kannada. The inscription translated to English is as follows "The Western Ganga King Madhava Mahadhiraja II, alias Simhavarman, gave sixty-five paddy fields, sowable with twenty five khandukas of paddy, below the big tank of Paruvi(old name of Parigi 200AD-1400AD) in "Paruvi Vishaya", to a Brahman named Kumarasarma of the vatsa gotra. The grant was made on the full-moon day in the month of Chaitra (lunar). No further deailts regarding the date are given. This Madhava Mahadhiraja is stated to have been installed on the throne, by the Pallava King Skandavarma Maharaja and Aryavarman, father of Madhava, was installed on the throne, by Simhavarma Maharaja, lord of the Pallava family. These plates are very important as there is mention of two contemporaneous Pallava Kings. Skandavarman appears to have been the son of Simhavarman and is supposed to have ruled during latter part of the 5th Century AD. The plates must therefore have been issued at the beginning of the 6th Century AD.

== Panchayats ==
The following is the list of village panchayats in Parigi mandal: Beechiganipalli, Honnampalli, Kodigenahalli, Moda, P.Narasapuram, Parigi, Pydeti, Sasanakota, Seegipalli, Sirekolam(Dhanapuram), Srirangarajupalli, Utakur, Vittapalli Yerragunta and Boreddipalli

== Temples ==
There are a few Hindu temples in and around Parigi and a couple of them are believed to have been built between 200–400 years ago as per local records and anecdotes. These are the:

Sri Venkateshwara Swamy Temple

Sri Anjaneya Swamy Temple

The other Temples are:

Devi Panadamma Temple - Grama Devatha

Sri Subramanya Temple

Sri RamaLingeshwara Temple
