= Vizag Thermal Power Station =

Coordinates: 17.5637°N 83.1396°E

Hinduja National Thermal Power Station, Vizag is a coal-based thermal power plant located in Palavalasa village in Visakhapatnam district, Andhra Pradesh. The power plant is owned by Hinduja National Power Company Limited, a subsidiary of the Hinduja Group.

The power plant is located on the coast of the Bay of Bengal and it uses sea water for cooling purpose.

== Capacity ==
The planned capacity of the power plant in 1040 MW (2x520 MW)

Stage	Unit Number	Planned Capacity	Date of Commissioning
1st	1	520 MW	January 2015
1st	2	520 MW	March 2015
