= Andhra Pradesh Power Generation Corporation Limited =

Power generating organization in India

- Native name: Āndhra rāṣṭra eṇḍana utpati samasta
- Company type: Public Sector Undertaking
- Industry: Electricity generation
- Founded: 1998 (27 years ago)
- Headquarters: Gunadala, Vijayawada, Andhra Pradesh, India
- Key people: Gottipati Ravi Kumar (Minister of Energy, Government of Andhra Pradesh); K. Vijayanand, IAS (Chairman); Nagalakshmi Selvarajan, IAS (Managing Director)
- Services: Electricity
- Total assets: ▲₹17,344 crore (2008) or USD 3.5 Billion
- Total equity: ▲₹2,117 crore (2008) or USD 500 Million
- Owner: Government of Andhra Pradesh
- Number of employees: 10,889 (2008)
- Parent: Ministry of Energy, Government of Andhra Pradesh
- Website: APGENCO official website

The Andhra Pradesh Power Generation Corporation Limited (APPGCL) is power generating organization in Andhra Pradesh. It undertakes operation and maintenance of the power plants and also setting up new power projects alongside upgrading the project's capacity, under the recommendations of Hittenbhayya committee setup by TDP Govt.

== History ==
The government reforms in power sector led to the formation of APGENCO on 28 December 1998 and commenced operations from 1 February 1999. The imbalance of the revenues against the cost of production, no significant reduction in technical losses and energy thefts, high cost purchases from IPP's, other SEB's gradually worsened the financial position of APSEB.

== APSEB division ==
Government of Andhra Pradesh realizing the declining tendency of the financial position of APSEB and considering the recommendations made by committee it was unbundled into Andhra Pradesh Power Generation Corporation (APGENCO) & Transmission Corporation of Andhra Pradesh Limited (APTRANSCO) on 1 February 1999 by AP Electricity REFORMS ACT.

APTRANSCO was further unbundled w.e.f. 1 April 2000 into "Transmission Corporation" and four "Distribution Companies" (DISCOMS). From Feb 1999 to June 2005 APTransco remained as single buyer in purchasing and selling of power to DISCOMs.

== APGENCO formation and split ==
Later, on 2 June 2014, when the state was bifurcated, APGENCO distributed all the assets, liabilities and power stations to both the states and Telangana Power Generation Corporation Limited (TGGENCO) was formed for the newly formed Telangana state and APGENCO remained for Andhra Pradesh in accordance with the Andhra Pradesh Reorganisation Act, 2014.

== Power plants ==
The total installed capacity of APGENCO, after the state's bifurcation is 6389 MW comprising 4210 MW Thermal, 1747.60 MW Hydro and 405.40 MW Solar power plants. The Power Plants of APGENCO include thermal, hydel, Pumped Storage and solar power plants.

=== Thermal projects ===
Sl. No.	Project	Capacity (installed / under construction) (MW)	Total (installed) (MW)	Gallery
1	Vijayawada TPP	6×210 + 1×500 + 1×800	2560	Dr Narla Tata Rao Thermal Power Station
2	Rayalaseema TPP	5×210 + 1×600	1650	Rayalaseema Thermal Power Station
Overall capacity		4210	4210	

Note:Damoadaram Sanjeevaiah Thermal Plant (3x800 MW) is having subsidiary ownership of APGENCO.

=== Hydel projects ===
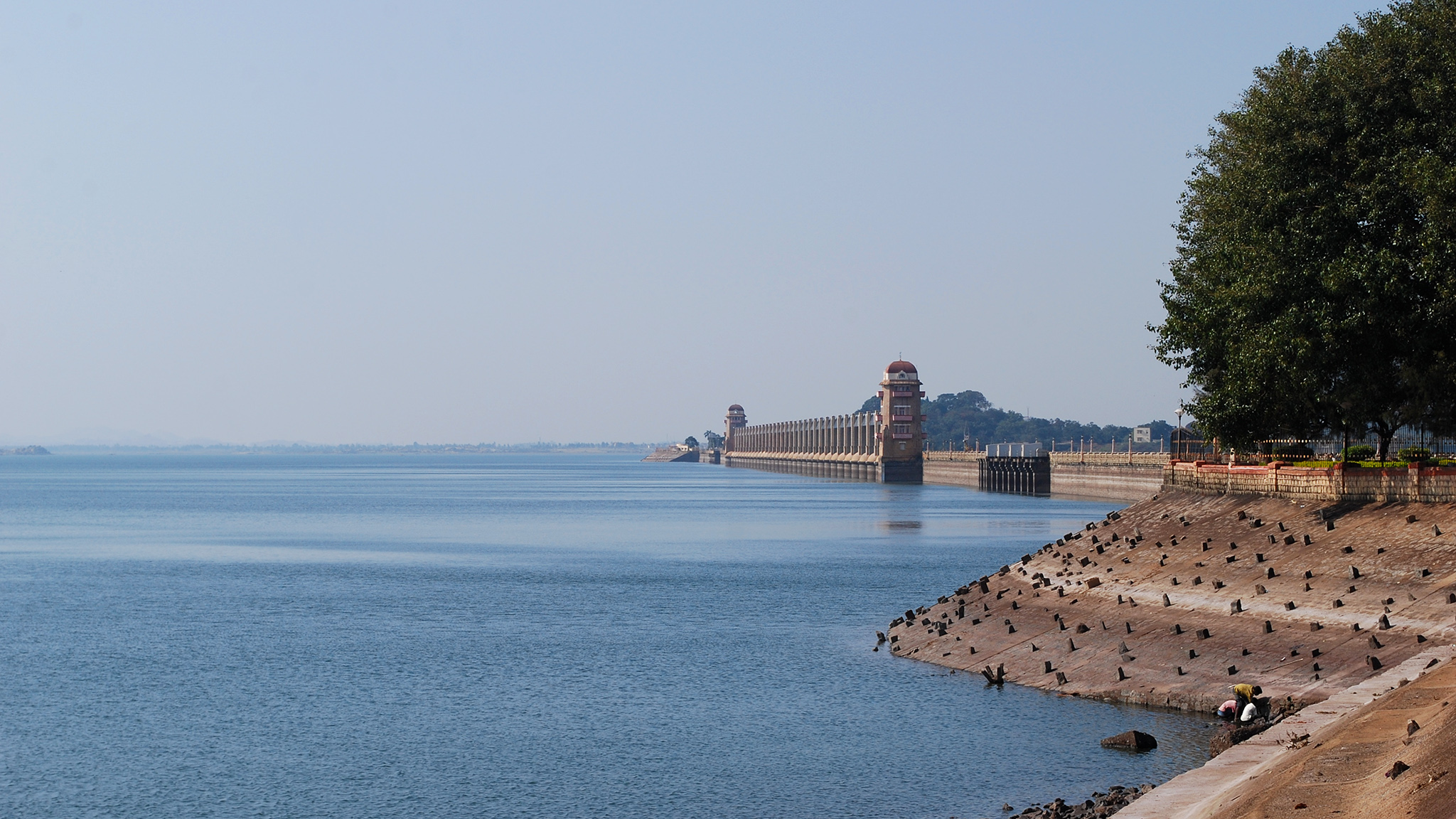
Tungabhadra dam

Sr. No.	Project	Installed Capacity (MW)	Total (MW)	
1	Chettipeta Mini Hydel	2 x 0.5	1	
2	Donkarayi PH	1 x 25	25	
3	Hampi Dam PH	4 x 9 (AP Share – 28.8)	28.8	
4	Lower Sileru PH	4 x 115	460	
5	Machkund PH	3 x 17 + 3 x 23 (AP Share – 84)	84	
6	Nagarjuna Sagar RCPH	3 x 30	90	
7	Penna Ahobilam PH	2 x 10	20	
8	Srisailam RBPH	7 x 110	770	
9	Tungabhadra Dam PH	4 x 9 (AP Share – 28.8)	28.8	
10	Upper Sileru PH	4 x 60	240	
	Overall capacity			1747.6

Hydel projects (under construction)

Sr. No.	Project	Installed Capacity (MW)	Total (MW)
1	Polavaram HEP	12 x 80	960
2	Nagarjuna Sagar tail pond PH	2 x 25	50
Overall capacity			960

=== Non-conventional units ===
Sl. No.	Project	Inst.Capacity (MW)	Total (MW)
1	Ramagiri Wind Mill	10 x 0.2	2.0
Overall capacity			2.0

Source: Power Stations of AP after bifurcation into APGENCO and TGGENCO

== Operational performance ==
Though the performance of APGenCo thermal power stations in terms of reliability, availability and maintainability (RAM analysis) is one of the best in India, its hydro power stations performance is satisfactory.monsoon season. The thermal efficiency (heat rate) of thermal power stations is quite remarkable. Operating the thermal power stations in the range of 75 to 100% capacity in 'frequency follow mode' with good part load efficiency is the needful strategy in surplus electricity grid except during peak demand hours. Also Hydro power stations should perform well meeting all the functions such as power factor correction, peaking power generation, pumping water in pump mode and secondary power generation during monsoon season utilising total available water. This can be achieved by maintaining hydro power stations at availability more than 95%.

== See also ==
- List of hydroelectric power station failures
- Power sector of Andhra Pradesh
- APTransCo
- Electricity sector in India
- Energy policy of India
- Load following power plant
- Levelised energy cost
- Energy returned on energy invested
- Coal slurry pipeline
- Grid parity
- Net metering
- Negawatt power
- Index of solar energy articles
- Solar power in India
- Wind power in India
- Torrefaction
- Central Electricity Authority
- Economics of new nuclear power plants
- Availability-based tariff
- Demand response
- National Grid (Great Britain)
- Spark spread
- Electricity market
- Electricity Act (2003)
