= List of rivers of Andhra Pradesh =

The major rivers of Andhra Pradesh are Godavari, Krishna and Pennar. The coastline of Andhra Pradesh has a length of 1053 km (654.3039 mi), the Third longest coastline in India after Gujarat and Tamil Nadu.

== List ==
- Krishna River
- Godavari River
- Penna River
- Tungabhadra River
- Vamsadhara River
- Vedavathi River
- Swarnamukhi River
- Veda River
- Avathi River
- Jayamangali River
- Chitravathi River
- Sagileru River
- Cheyyeru River
- Kundu River
- Maldevi River
- Papagni River
- Kunderu River
- Bahuda River
- Puncha River
- Mahendratanaya River
- Nagavali River
- Sileru River
- Arani River
- Bendi Gedda
- Bahuda River
- Budameru River
- Champavathi River
- Garibula Gedda
- Galeru River
- Gosthani River
- Gundlakamma River
- Kinnerasani River
- Kandaleru River
- Kandivalasa River
- Kalangi River
- Koringa River
- Kundu River
- Madala River
- Manneru River
- Munneru River
- Murredu River
- Nadari River
- Kosasthalaiyar River
- Narava Gedda
- Palar River
- Paleru River
- Pedda Gedda
- Pedda Vagu
- Ponnaiyar River
- Sabari River
- Sarada River
- Swarnamukhi River
- Tammileru River
- Tandava River
- Varaha River
- Vedavathi River
- Yeleru River
- Yerrakaluva

== See also ==
- List of rivers of India
