= Palkonda Hills =

Hill range in India

- Palkonda
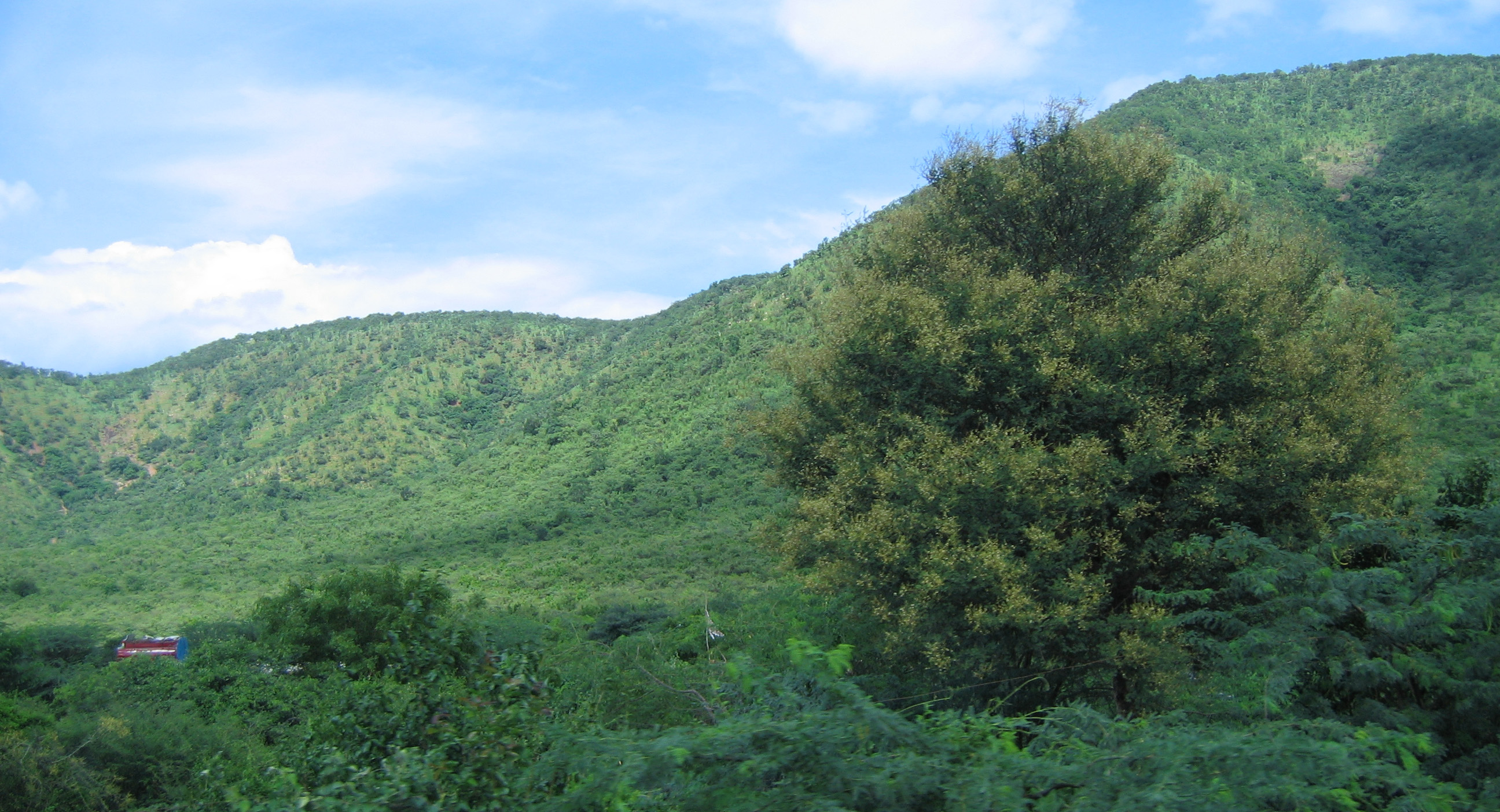
- View of Palkonda Hill Range in Kadapa district

Highest point
- Coordinates: 14°20′47″N 78°39′06″E

Geography
- Country: India
- Provinces/States: Andhra Pradesh

Geology
- Rock age: Cambrian

Palkonda Hills are a range of hills that form a part of the Eastern Ghats in the southern Indian state of Andhra Pradesh. Meaning "milk hills", they run along a northwest to southeast direction, culminating at the pilgrimage centre of Tirupati.

== Etymology ==
The name Palkonda translates into "milk hills", a combination of the Telugu words pāl meaning milk and konda meaning hill. The name is attributed to the presence of pasture grounds in them.

== Geographical extent ==
The Palkonda range has a southeast to northwest orientation and traverse the districts of Anantapur and Kadapa. These hills average 2,000 ft in elevation. The highest point of the range is at Buttaid where it reaches a height of 3,060 ft. Seshachalam Hills, in the Kadapa and Chitoor district, are closely located.

== Geology ==
The Palkonda hills are relict mountains that can be traced back to the Cambrian period. They have over the course of over 500 million years been eroded by the Penner river and its tributaries. The hills are largely composed of quartzite formations interspersed with lava and slate deposits.

== Rivers ==
The Punchu and Cheyyeru are important rivers of this region and, along with the Chitravati and Papagni rivers, form a series of river basins that marks the middle course of the Penner river of which they are tributaries. There are several streams between the Palkonda and its parallel range Velikonda that have been dammed to irrigate the valleys between the ranges. Jowar and groundnut are the principal crops cultivated here.

== Flora and fauna ==
There are teak forests in these hills and it is also a habitat of the highly endangered Jerdon's courser.

== Human habitations ==
The sacred hill of Tirumala and temple town of Tirupati lies at the southeastern end of the Palkonda range. The Mumbai-Chennai railway line is an important transport artery that runs parallel to the hills through Guntakal and Renigunta.
