= Nandi Hills, India =

Nandi Hills, India Nandi Betta Nandidurga
- town
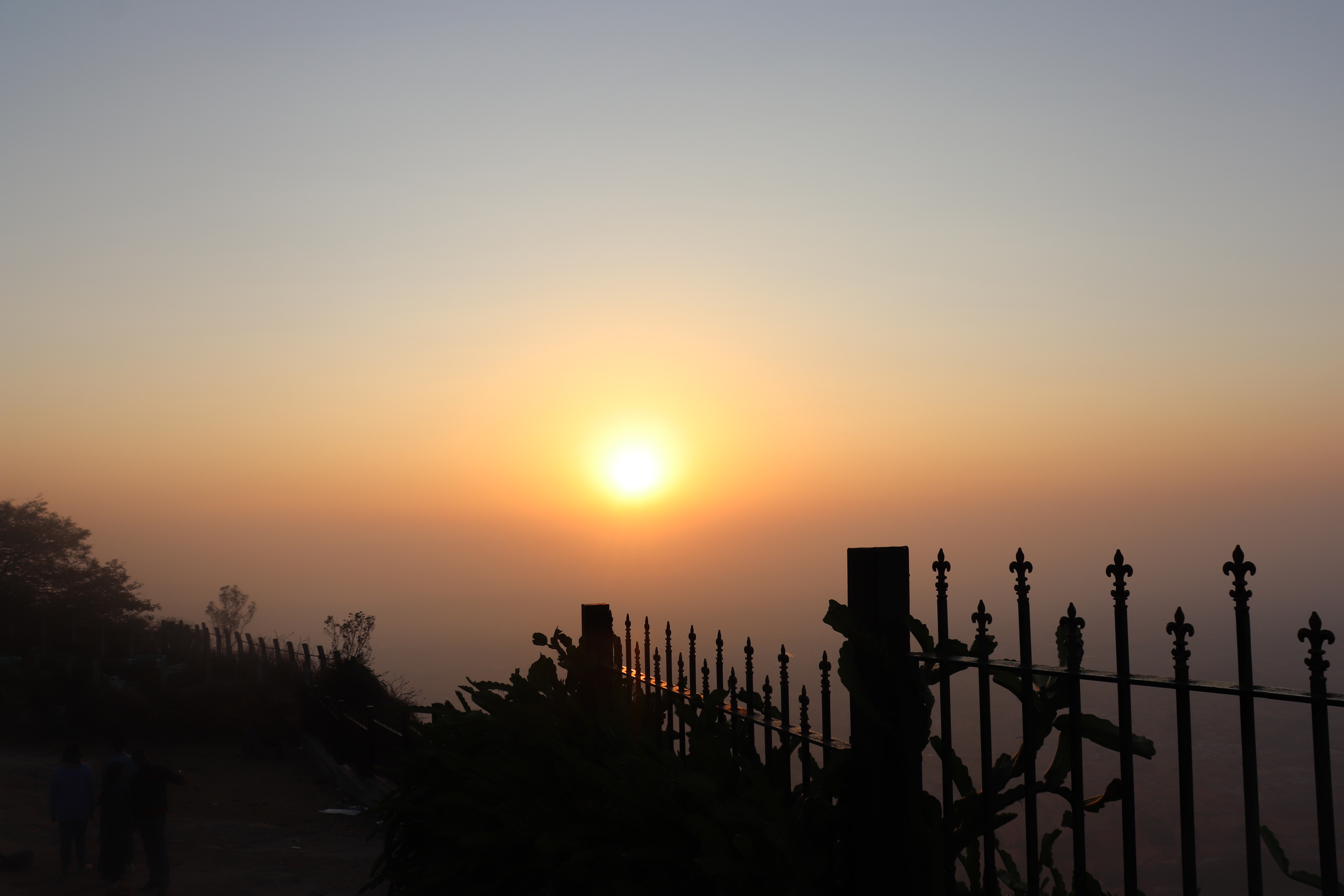
- Sunrise seen from Nandi Hills

- Location in Karnataka, India
- Coordinates: 13.38626°N 77.70093°E
- Country: India
- State: Karnataka
- District: Chikkaballapur
- Elevation: 1,478 m (4,849 ft)

Languages
  - Official: Kannada
- Time zone: UTC+5:30 (IST)
- Nearest city: Bangalore

Nandi Hills (Anglicised forms include Nandidurg and Nandydoorg) is an ancient hill fortress built by the Ganga dynasty in the Chikkaballapur district of Karnataka state. It is now a locality situated 10 km from Chickballapur town and approximately 60 km from Bengaluru. The hills are near the town of Nandi. The hills are the origin of the Arkavathy river, Ponnaiyar River, Palar River, Papagni River and Penna River. Watching the sunrise at Nandi Hills is popular with tourists. The second SAARC summit was held at Nandi Hills in 1986.

== Etymology ==
There are many stories about the origin of the name Nandi Hills. During the Chola period, Nandi Hills was called Anandagiri meaning The Hill of Happiness. It is also perhaps called Nandi Hills because the hills resemble a sleeping bull. It is also said that the Yoga Nandeeshwara performed penance here after whom the place is named. Another theory holds that the hill gets its name from an ancient, 1300-year-old, Dravidian-style temple, and for the Nandi (bull), statue situated on this hill.

== History ==
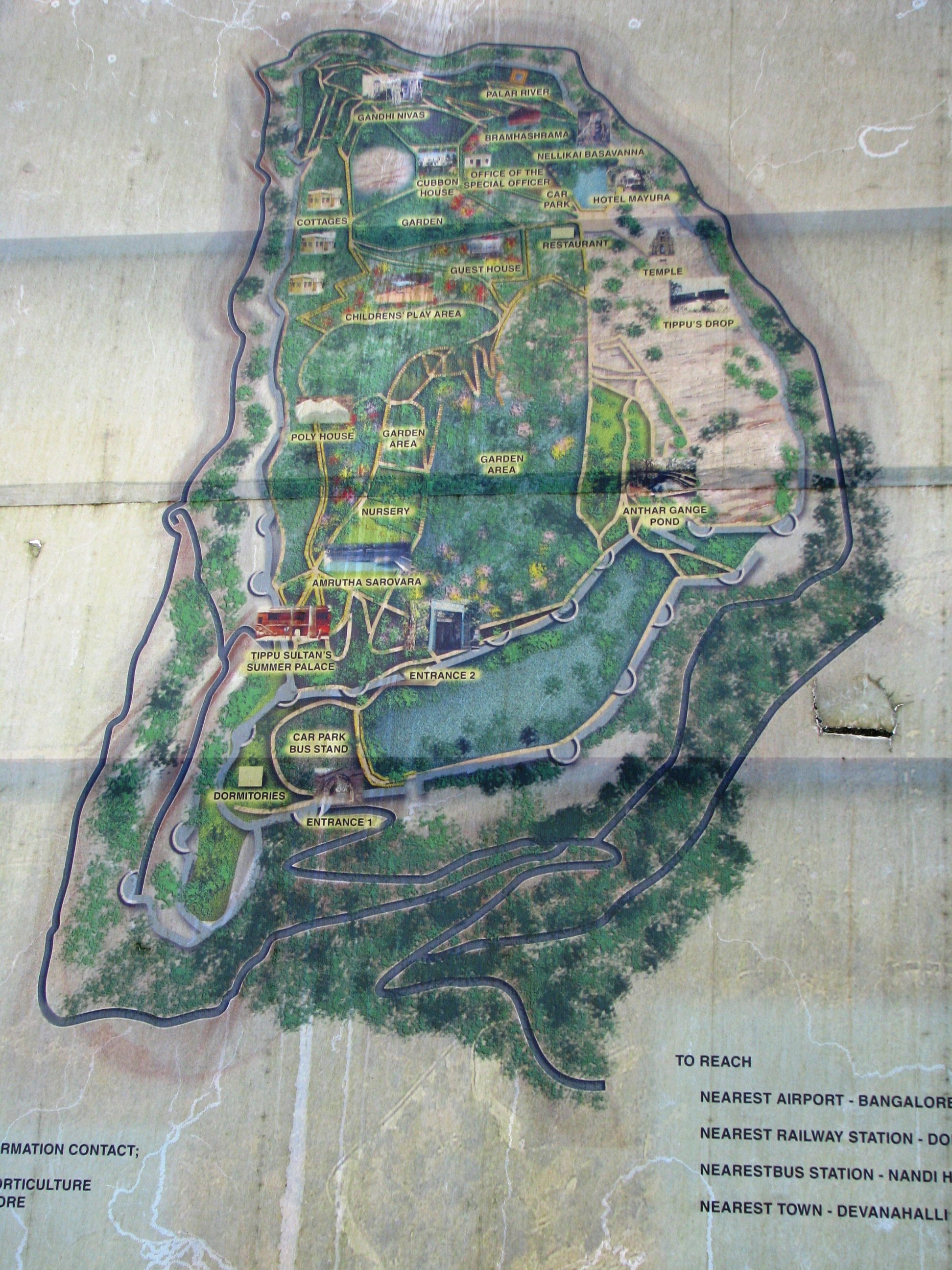
Top of Nandi Hills

Nandi Hills was developed by Ganga Dynasty in 11th century. It was also used by Tipu Sultan as a summer retreat.

Nandidurga was traditionally held impregnable, and its storming by the army of Cornwallis on 19 October 1791 was one of the most notable incidents of the first war against Tipu Sultan of Mysore. A description of the siege is given in Browne's History of Scotland and the records of the 71st Highlanders.

Nundydroog, a celebrated fortress and country of Hindostan, in the province of Mysore. The former is built on the summit of a rock, about 1700 feet high, three-fourths of its circumference being inaccessible. Our forces took it by storm in 1791, after a three weeks' siege. It stands in long. 77° 53' E., and lat. 13° 22' N.

— London Encyclopaedia, 1829

It later became a retreat for British Raj officials during the hot season. Francis Cunningham built the summer residence here for Sir Mark Cubbon.

...this droog, one now used as a hotel, built by General Cubbon, sometime British resident; but the rock has a bad reputation for malaria, and except in the very dry months is shunned by visitors, in spite of its, to the senses, delightful climate

— Lt. Gen. E F Burton

The climate at the top of the hill made it of interest to horticulturists. Several species of plant were introduced into an experimental garden. Firminger's manual notes that several species of Anona were grown at this garden and also notes the peculiarity of Hypericum mysorense:

H. mysorense.—An ornamental bush indigenous to the Western Ghauts, but rarely found in gardens. It is domesticated, or wild, in the Fort at Nandidroog, the latter being situated on the top of an isolated hill on the plateau of Mysore at an elevation of 4,850 feet. This is mentioned, as curiously enough, one has to travel more than a hundred miles towards the Western Ghauts, before the plant is met with in the wild state again. Fertile seed has never been secured. The fine yellow flowers are three inches across. Only suitable for the shrubbery in hill gardens.

— Burns, 1930

Potato cultivation was introduced for the first time in the neighbourhood of Bangalore by a Colonel Cuppage and continued by the botanist Benjamin Heyne. Heyne brought seeds from St. Helena and these grew well enough that they were supplied in Madras and preferred to those obtained from Bengal. In 1860, tea plants were tried on Nandi Hills by Hugh Cleghorn.

== Development ==
The Department of Horticulture is setting up a one-crore food court. A 30-lakh music stage, located on a 3.5 acres (1.4 ha) grove, was proposed for use to conduct cultural programmes. In addition to the development of a large-scale exotic botanical garden, a planetarium with an initial one-crore investment is also being constructed. A gondola lift system will connect the peak of the Nandi Hill with the nearby Muddenahalli. Other projects including Prestige Golfshire and QVC Nandi Hills are coming up near Nandi Hills. There are also proposals to construct cable cars, at the cost of 15 to 20 crore, to protect the local environment and reduce the number of vehicles going to the hills.

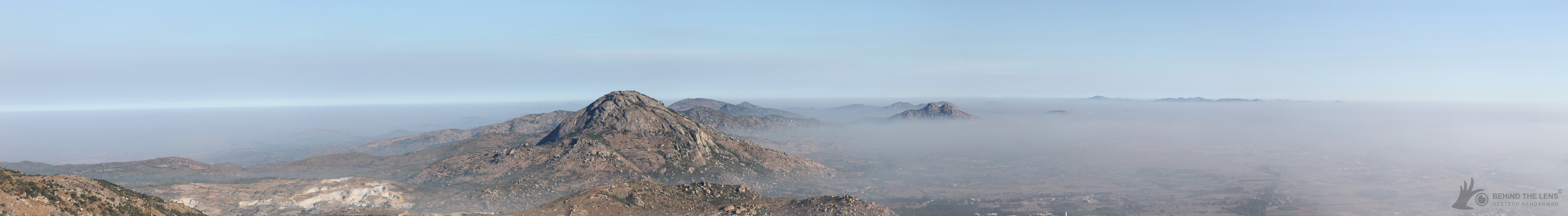
Panorama View from Nandi Hills looking towards north

== Notable places ==
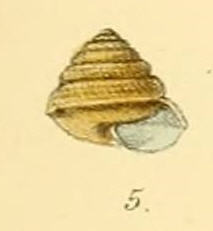
Sitala palmaria, a land snail described from the Nandi Hills by William Henry Benson

Places of interest in the area include Yoga Nandeeshwara Temple (a Hindu temple in Chikkaballapur district), Tipu's Summer Palace, Tipu Drop, and Skandagiri.

== Biodiversity ==
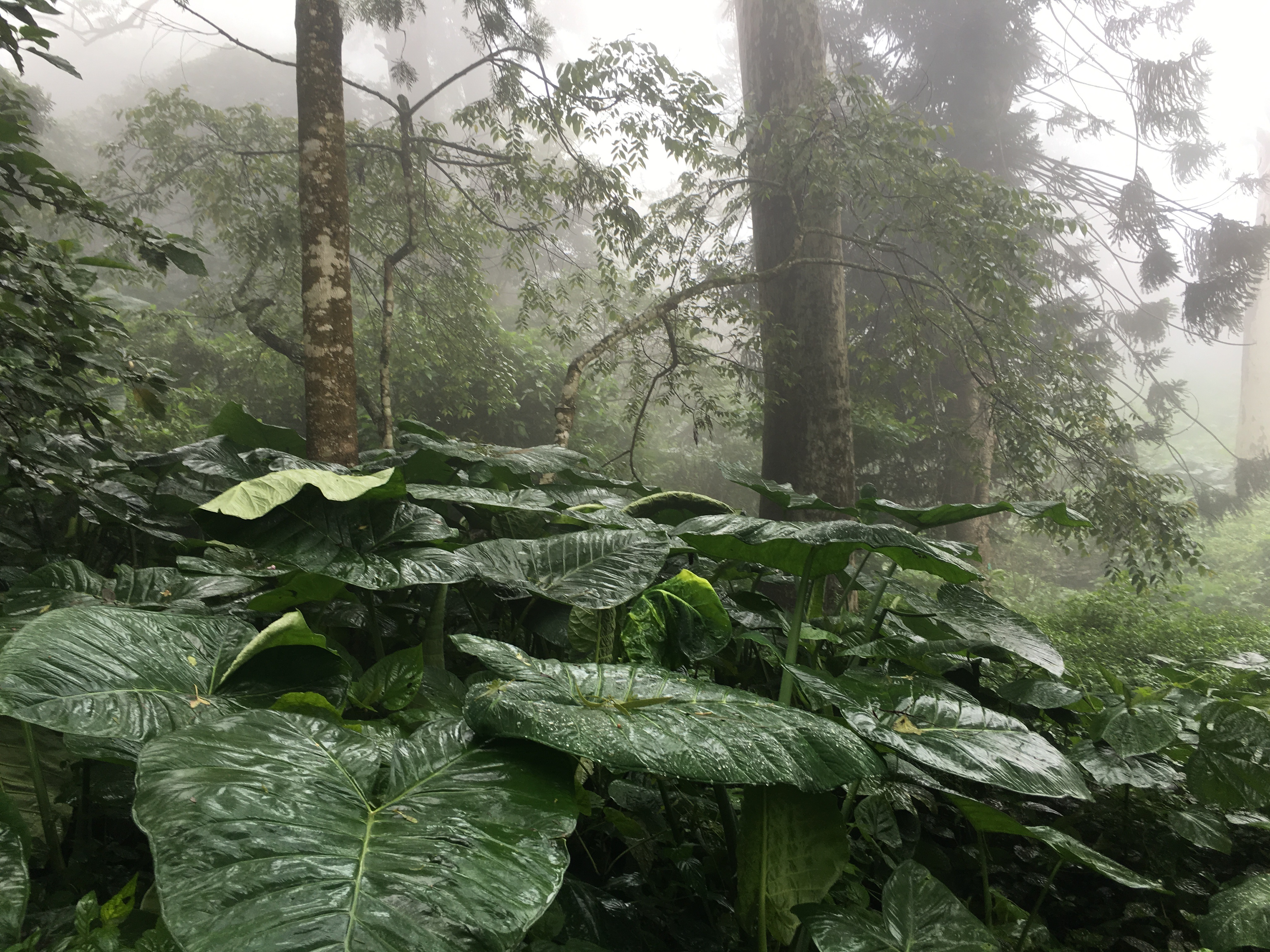
Vegetation on Nandi Hills

The vegetation of the hills is typical of high hills. Inside the fort at the summit, many of the large trees are planted exotics such as Eucalyptus and the undergrowth consists of Coffea arabica along with some native species. The forest acts as a substrate for cloud condensation and every morning the trees are covered in water. This allows for many moist forest species of plants and animals.

The hills are very rich in birdlife making it a popular location for birdwatchers and bird photographers. The evergreen forest patch on top of the hill being a favoured wintering location for many migrant species of warblers, flycatchers and thrushes. The forest patch is also home for a relict population of the Nilgiri woodpigeon. A breeding pair of shaheen falcon, the resident race of the peregrine falcon is also often seen at the Nandi Hills. The Malabar whistling thrush, Uropeltid snakes and pill millipedes which are otherwise known only from the Western Ghats ranges are also found here. The hill slopes are the home of the yellow-throated bulbul, a species endemic to the hills of peninsular India.

== Hiking and trekking ==
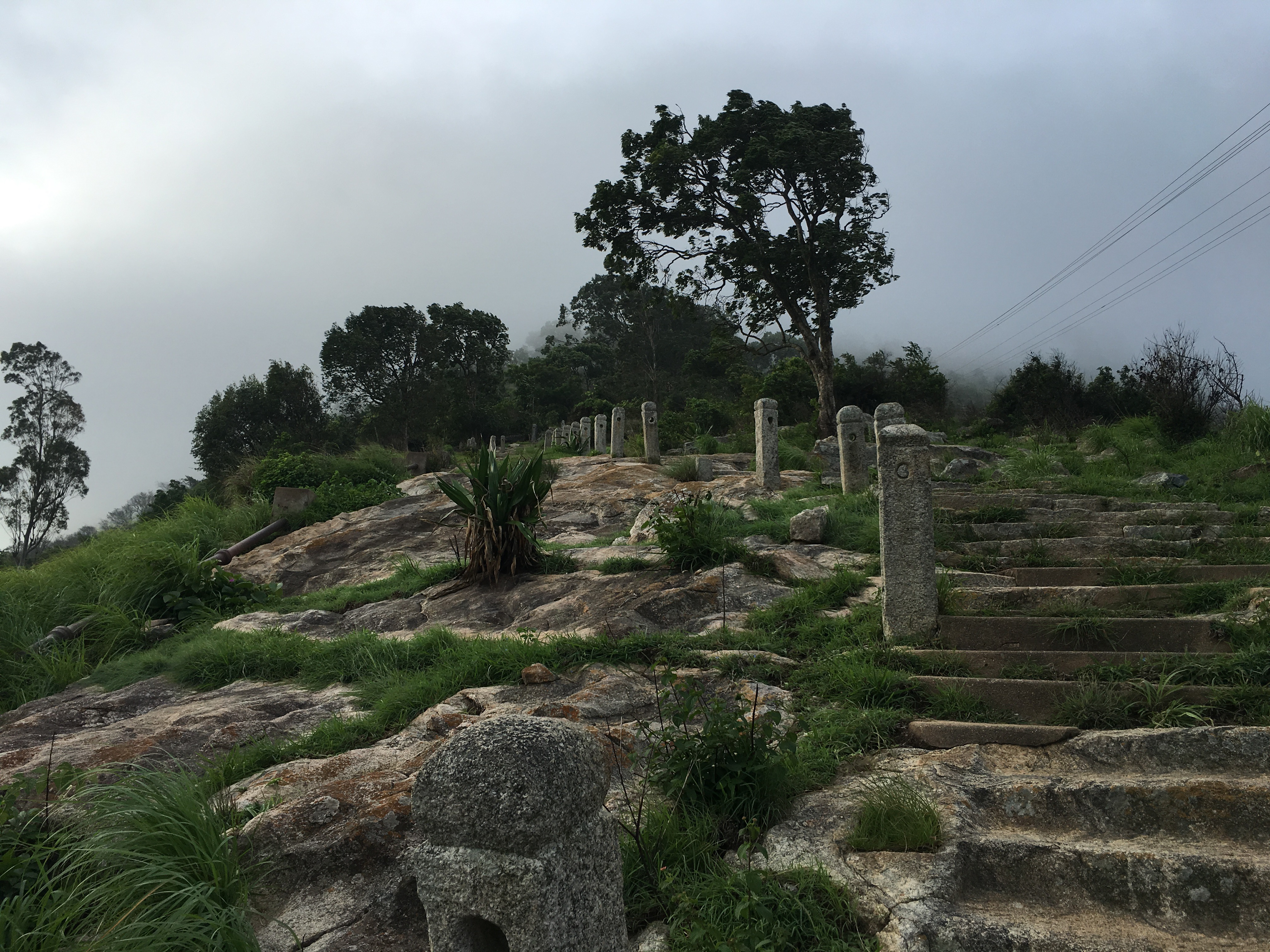
Nandi Hills Trekking Path

Nandi Hills is a destination for hiking and trekking for beginners to intermediate level. Trails in the area include the staircase-based trekking path which starts near Sultanpet village.

As of March 2022, visitors require prior District administration passes to visit Nandi hills on weekends to manage parking and reduce overcrowding on the hill station. Only 1,000 two-wheelers and 300 light motor vehicles parking is allowed on the hill station. Passes can be purchased at the Ticket counter at the base of the hill station or through KSTDC website. Earlier Nandi Hills was closed due to Covid restrictions.
