= Chitravathi River =

River in India

Coordinates: 14°09′31″N 77°49′04″E

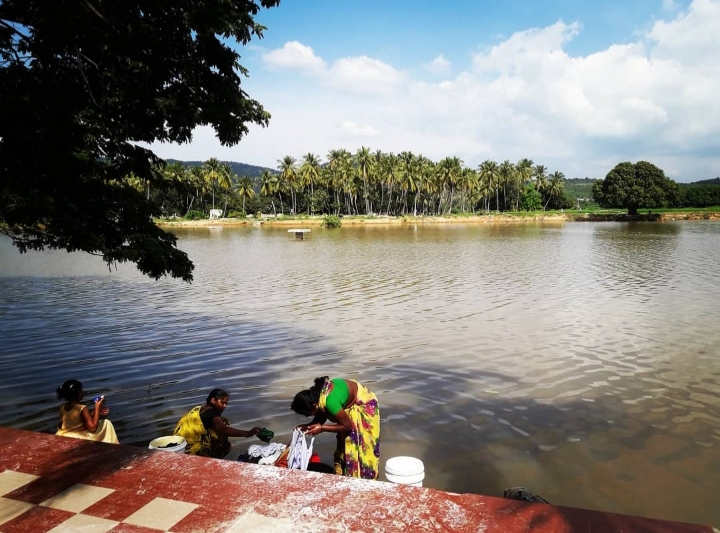
The Chitravathi at Puttaparthi

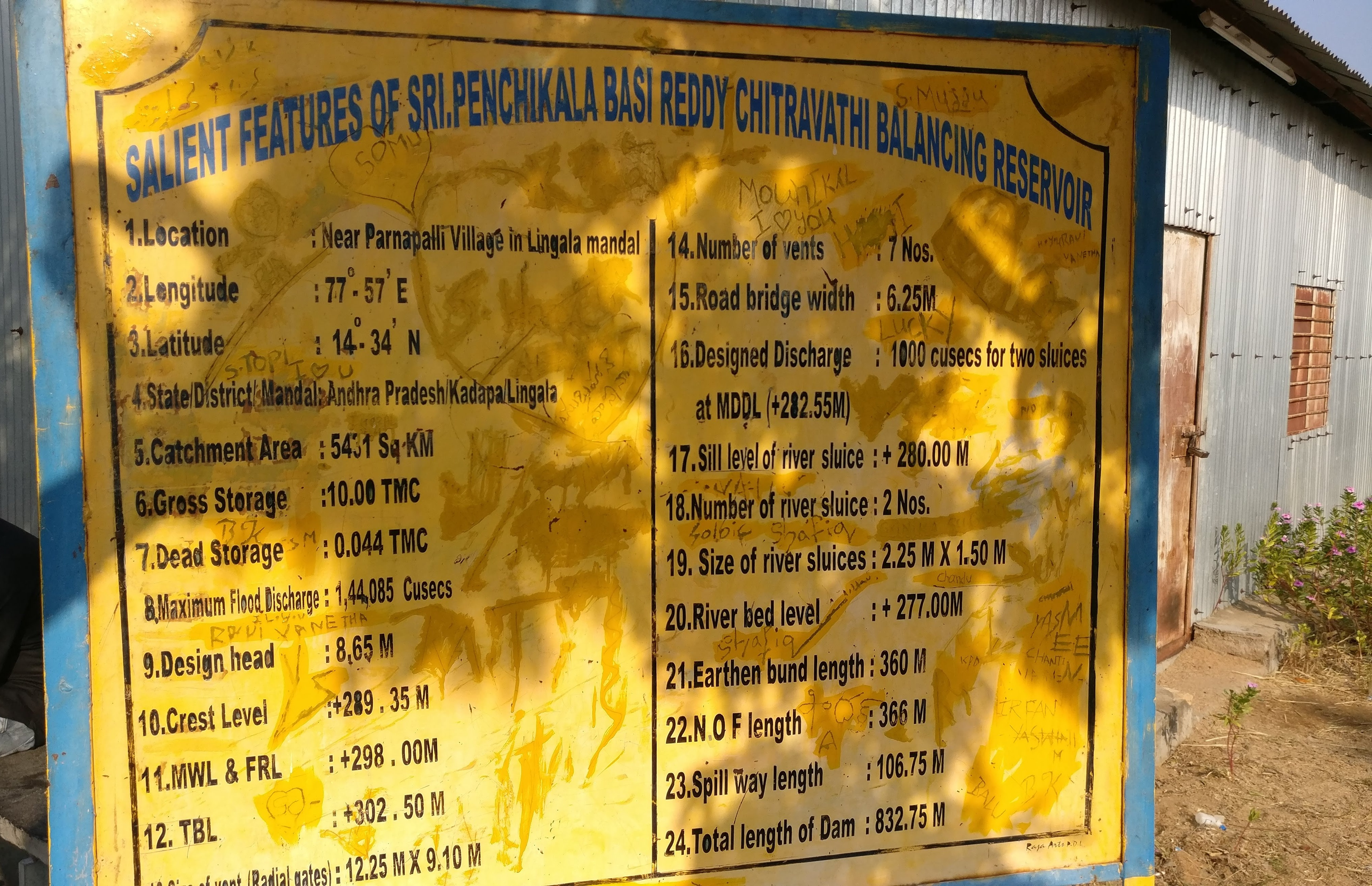
Details of Chitravati Balancing Reservoir at Parnapalli

The Chitravathi is an inter-state river in southern India that is a tributary of the Penna River. Rising in Karnataka, it flows into Andhra Pradesh and its basin covers an area of over 5,900 km^{2}. The pilgrim town of Puttaparthi is located on its banks.

== Course ==
Chitravathi river originates at Chikkaballapur and flows through the Chikkaballapur district of Karnataka before entering Andhra Pradesh where it drains the undivided districts of Anantapur and Cuddapah before joining the Penna river. The Chitravathi river basin covers an area of 5,908 km^{2}. The mandals that it drains in the two states are Bagepalli, Gorantla, Hindupur, Puttaparthi, Bukkapatnam, Dharmavaram, Tadipatri and Mudigubba. The river joins the Penna at Gandikota in Kadapa district where the Gandikota irrigation project is being undertaken by the Government of Andhra Pradesh as part of its Jalayagnam project. Chitravathi is a seasonal river that comes alive after the monsoons. Along with the Papagni, it forms a part of the middle Penna sub-basin and is a right bank tributary of the Penna.

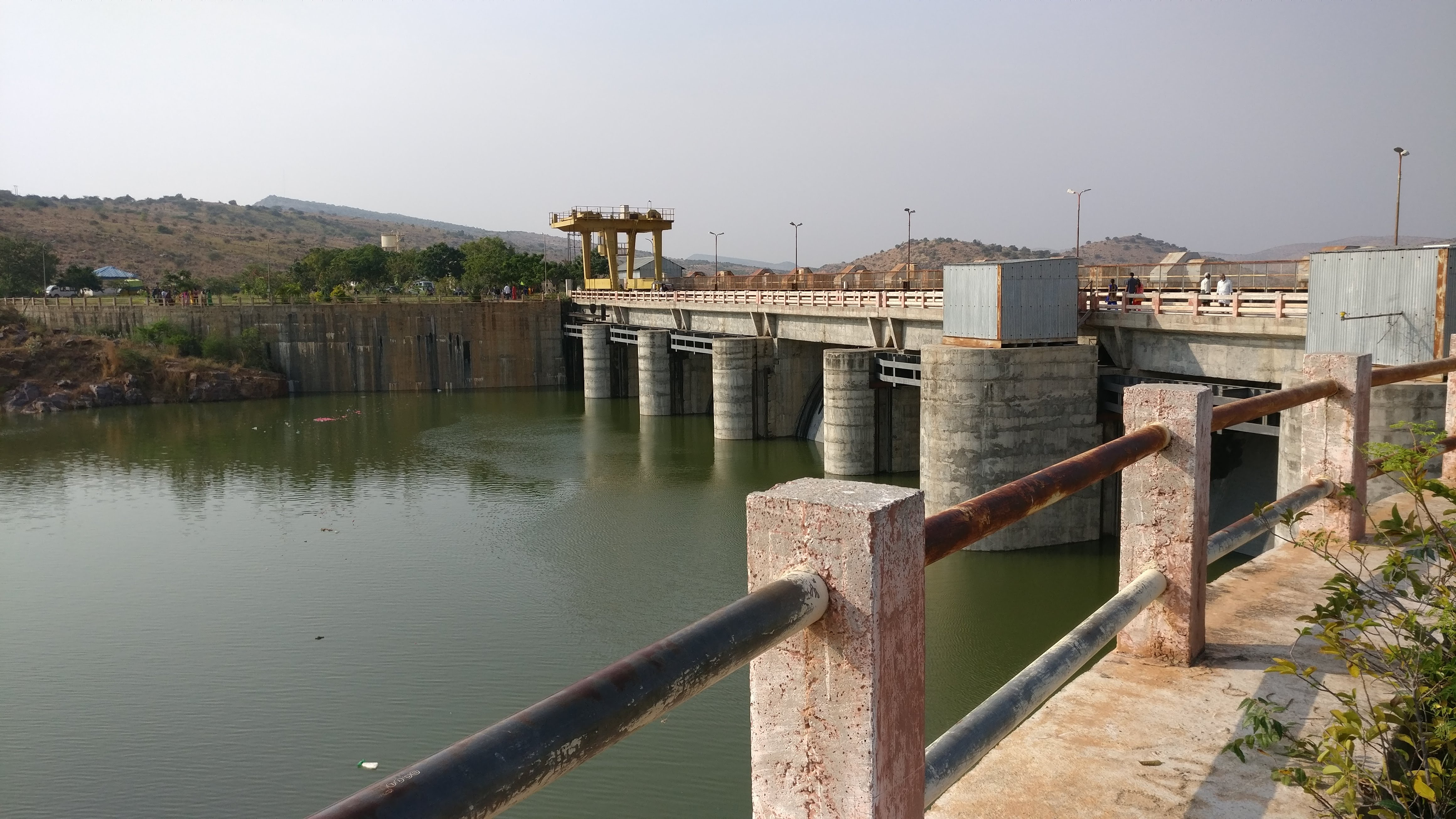
Chitravati Balancing Reservoir at Parnapalli on 15 January 2018

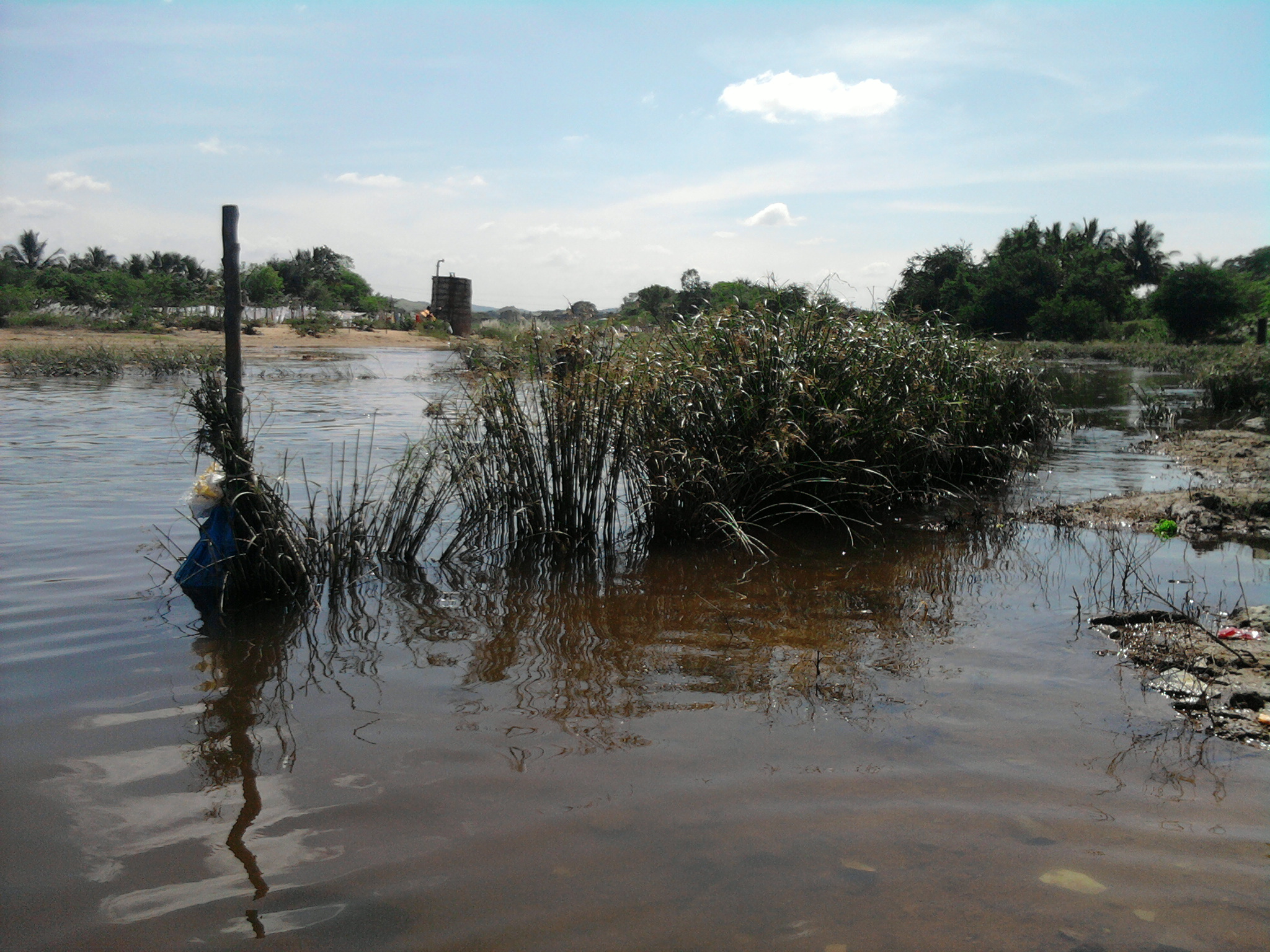
Chitravathi River

== Paragodu project ==
The proposal to build a barrage at Paragodu by the Government of Karnataka has been opposed by politicians from Andhra Pradesh who argue that the move is likely to affect the availability of water for the various tank irrigation projects that exist in the Andhra districts.

== Ecological issues ==
Sand mining, much of it illegal, is rampant in the Chitravathi basin and this has resulted in severe depletion of groundwater resources in the region.

== Religious significance ==
Chitravathi is also known as the Deva Kanya and it flows through the pilgrim town of Puttaparthi, the place of Indian spiritual leader Sathya Sai Baba. It is considered sacred by many people on account of its association with Sathya Sai Baba.
