= Yellayapalem =

- village
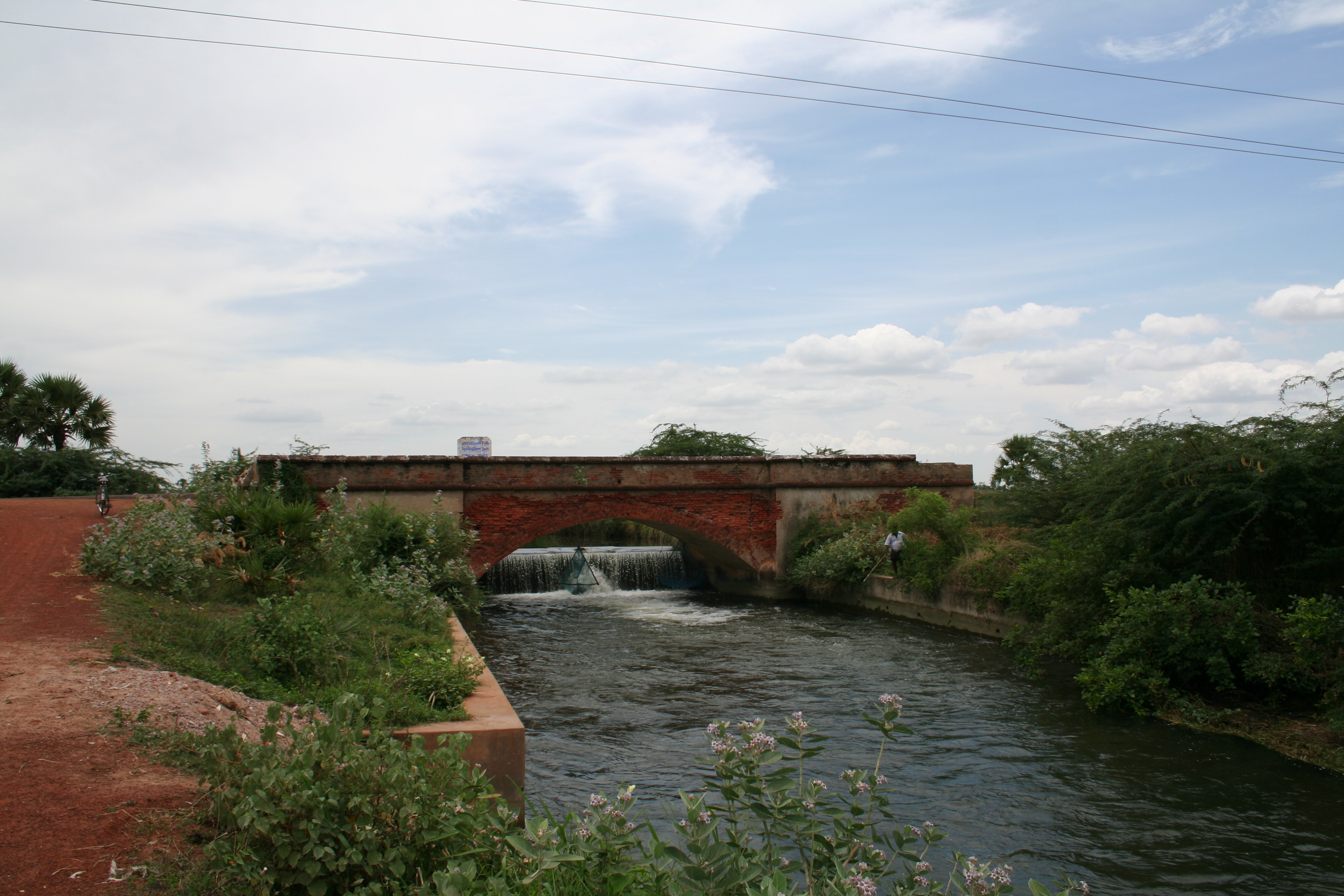
- The River Maldevi, and a bridge, in Yellayapalem
- Interactive map of Yellayapalem
- Location in Andhra Pradesh, India Yellayapalem (India)
- Coordinates: 14.537768°N 79.951544°E
- Country: India
- State: Andhra Pradesh

Languages
  - Official: Telugu
- Time zone: UTC+5:30 (IST)

Yellayapalem is located in the Kodavalur sub-district in the Nellore district in the state of Andhra Pradesh. The Indian census reports a population of 8215, with 2060 households.

A rivers, the Maldevi, runs through the village.
