= Sagileru =

River in Andhra Pradesh, India

Sagileru is a river in the southern Indian state of Andhra Pradesh that is a tributary of the Pennar.

== Sagileru basin ==
The Sagileru river valley lies between the Velikonda and Nallamala hills and has a north-south orientation. The river basin contains red, black and loamy soils and both wet and dry irrigated crops are grown in this region with bajra, ragi, jowar, groundnuts and vegetables belonging to the latter category.

== Waterworks ==
The Upper and Lower Sagileru projects are medium irrigation projects on the river and are located in the B.Kodur and Kalasapadu mandals of Kadapa district. Besides these there are several lift irrigation and minor irrigation works on the river. The Telugu Ganga canal project aims to enhance the irrigation potential of the Sagileru valley by diverting water for irrigation from the Sri Potuluri Veera Brahmendra Swami Reservoir to the Sagileru river. The building of this canal has however been criticised on the grounds of it posing a threat to the habitat of the highly endangered Jerdon's courser.
