= Bukkapatnam =

- Village
- Interactive map of Bukkapatnam
- Location in Andhra Pradesh, India
- Coordinates: 14.2000°N 77.8000°E
- Country: India
- State: Andhra Pradesh
- District: Sri Sathya Sai
- Talukas: Bukkapatnam

Population (2011)
  - Total: 12,196

Languages
  - Official: Telugu
- Time zone: UTC+5:30 (IST)
- PIN: 515144
- Telephone code: 91-8555

Bukkapatnam is a village in Sri Sathya Sai district of the Indian state of Andhra Pradesh. It is the headquarters of Bukkapatnam mandal in Puttaparthi revenue division.

== Geography ==
Bukkapatnam is located at 14.2000°N 77.8000°E. It has an average elevation of 508 metres (1669 ft). Bukkapatnam is located near Puttaparthi. Bukkapatnam has an area of 351.17 km^{2}, and a population of 37,635. The highest mountain of the Mallappakonda district is four miles to north of Bukkapatnam it is 3,002 feet (915 m) tall.

== Demographics ==
As of 2011 census, the village had a population of 12,196. The total population constitutes 6,081 males and 6,115 females —a sex ratio of 1006 females per 1000 males. 1,269 children are in the age group of 0–6 years, of which 655 are boys and 614 are girls —a ratio of 937 per 1000. The average literacy rate stands at 74.03% with 6,996 literates, significantly higher than the state average of 67.41%.
