= Penna River =

River in India

Penna Penneru, Penner, Pennar or Uttara Pinakini
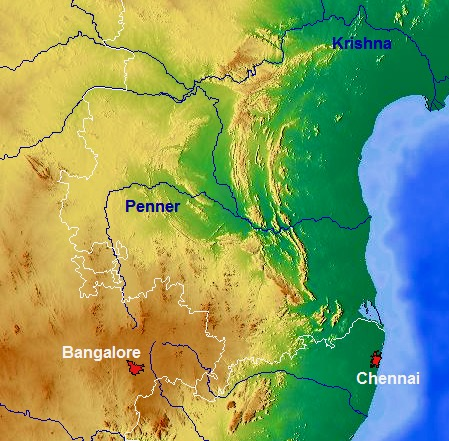
- Map showing the river

Location
- Country: India
- State: Andhra Pradesh, Karnataka
- Region: South India
- District: Chikkaballapura, Kolaru, Tumakuru, Sri Sathya Sai district, Kadapa and Nellore
- Cities: Chikkaballapura, Manchenahalli, Gauribidanuru, Hindupuram, Ananthapuram, Tadipatri, Proddaturu, Jammalamadugu, Kadapa, Nellore

Physical characteristics
- Source: South India
  - location: 13.39°N 77.61°E, Chikkaballapur district, Nandi Hills, Karnataka, India
- Mouth: Bay of Bengal
  - location: 14.58°N 80.14°E, Nellore, Utukuru, Andhra Pradesh, India
  - elevation: 0 m (0 ft)
- Length: 597 km (371 mi)
- Basin size: 55,213 km^{2} (21,318 sq mi)
- Discharge
  - location: Nellore (1965–1979 average), max (1991)
  - average: 200.4 m^{3}/s (7,080 cu ft/s)
  - minimum: 0 m^{3}/s (0 cu ft/s)
  - maximum: 1,876 m^{3}/s (66,300 cu ft/s)

Basin features
- Tributaries
  - left: Kunderu, Sagileru
  - right: Jayamangali, Chitravathi, Papagni, Cheyyeru

Penna (originally known as Penneru, also known as Pinakini, Penneru, Penner, Pennar, Pennai) is a river of southern India. After originating from Nandi hills, it flows as two different streams, one in North and South directions. The Penna rises in the Nandi Hills in Chikkaballapur District of Karnataka state, and runs north and east through the states of Karnataka and Andhra Pradesh to empty into bay of bengal in Andhra Pradesh. It is 597 kilometres (371 mi) long, with a drainage basin covering 55,213 km^{2}: 6,937 km^{2} in Karnataka and 48,276 km^{2} in Andhra Pradesh. Along with this main stream is another stream south towards Tamil Nadu with the name Then Pennai or south Pennar which further moves towards the east to empty into the Bay of Bengal. The Penna river basin lies in the rain shadow region of Eastern Ghats and receives 500 mm average rainfall annually.

== Etymology ==
Since the river flows in two streams, in both the north and south directions, it forms the shape of bow. Thus, this river gets the name of bow called Pinakini named after Pinaka, the bow of Nandishvara, the presiding deity of the Nandi hills at the origin of the river. The name of the river Penneru (alternatively Penner) is derived from the Telugu words పెను, penu, 'grand' and ఏఱు, ēṟu, 'river, stream, rivulet' or from నీరు, nīru, 'water'. It is also known as Uttara Pinakini in Karnataka.

== Geography ==
=== Course ===
The Penna river has several sources and mouths. The primary stream starts in Nandi Hills in of Karnataka, running for 597 km to the north and east through several mountains and plains, draining into the Bay of Bengal in Nellore district of Andhra Pradesh. The river is seasonal, its main source of the water being from rains. Therefore, it appears like minor stream during periods of drought. The major tributaries of the Penna are the Jayamangali, Kunderu and Sagileru from the north, and Chitravathi, Papagni and Cheyyeru from the south.

==== Karnataka ====
The Penna river rises at 13.25°N 77.41°E at 11 km southwest of Chikkaballapur in Chennakesava Range of Nandi Hills in Karnataka. It begins flowing to the northwest at its source, near the town of Maralur. It flows for 48 km towards the north through the Kolar and Tumkur districts in Karnataka before entering Andhra Pradesh State at Hindupur Sri Sathya Sai district.

==== Ananatapur ====
At 69 km, the Penna meets the Kumudavati river. At 82 km, the Penna meets the Jayamangali river near the town of Hindupur in Sri Sathya Sai district. The Jayamangali river rises in Tumkur district and traverses 77 km in northeast direction before joining the river on the left bank. The Penna flows almost northwards for the next 146 km from the confluence of Jayamangali.

After traversing 67 km in Anantapur district, the Penna reenters Karnataka at Pavagada Taluk in Tumkur district at 115 km from its source. After traversing 13 km in Tumkur district again, it reenters Andhra Pradesh in Kalyandurg Taluk in Anantapur district at 128 km from its source. The Penna turns east at Penna Ahobilam and flows through Marutla and Katrimala forest reserves and near towns like Tadipatri.

==== Kadapa ====
The Penna gains the volume but loses stream by the time it crosses Palakondalu and enters Kadapa district of Andhra Pradesh. It regains the stream in district after meeting many tributaries including Chitravati, Bahuda, Papagni, Kunderu, Sagileru and Cheyyeru and flows near the towns like Kodur, Jammalamadugu, Proddatur, Kamalapuram and Siddhavattam.

The Penna meets its major tributary Chitravati at Gandalur near the Gandikota at 336 km from its source. The Chitravati rises near the Chikballapur town in the Chikballapur district of Karnataka and traverses 218 km in northeast direction in Kolar, Anantapur and Cuddapah districts before joining the Penna on the right bank. The Penna river forces through Gandikota gorge and flows east through a gap in the Eastern Ghats to go to the plains of Coastal Andhra.

The rivers Papagni and Kunderu meets the Penna near Kamalapuram. The Papagni river rises near Sidlaghatta town in Kolar district of Karnataka and traverses 205 km before joining the Penna on the right bank. The Kunderu river rises in Kurnool district of Andhra Pradesh and travels 205 km before joining the Penna on the left bank.

The Penna river continues in southeastern direction and cuts across the Nallamala hills. The river meets sagileru and turns east. The Sagileru rises in Prakasam district and flows south to meet the Penna. The Penna river meets Cheyyeru at Boyanapalli and Gundlamada near the Sidhout on the right bank. The Cheyyeru river is formed by the confluence of the rivers Bahuda and Pincha that originate in the Chittoor district of Andhra Pradesh. The two streams join at Rayavaram and flows towards north for 87 km before joining the Penna.

==== Nellore ====
The Penna emerges from Velikonda Range in Eastern Ghats at 467 km from its source and enters the plains under Somasila Dam in the Nellore district. The river flows near the towns like Atmakuru, Kovur, Jonnawada, Sangam and Nellore.

It meets two minor tributaries, the Boggeru and the Biraperu near the Sangam town. The Boggeru rises in Boggu Venkatapuram and joins other minor streams before meeting the Penna river. The Biraperu is a small stream which carries rainfall of the north east portion of Nellore, Udayagiri and Kavali Mandals to the Penna river.

It finally joins the Bay of Bengal at 14.58°N 80.14°E near Utukuru at 597 km from its source.

=== Basin ===
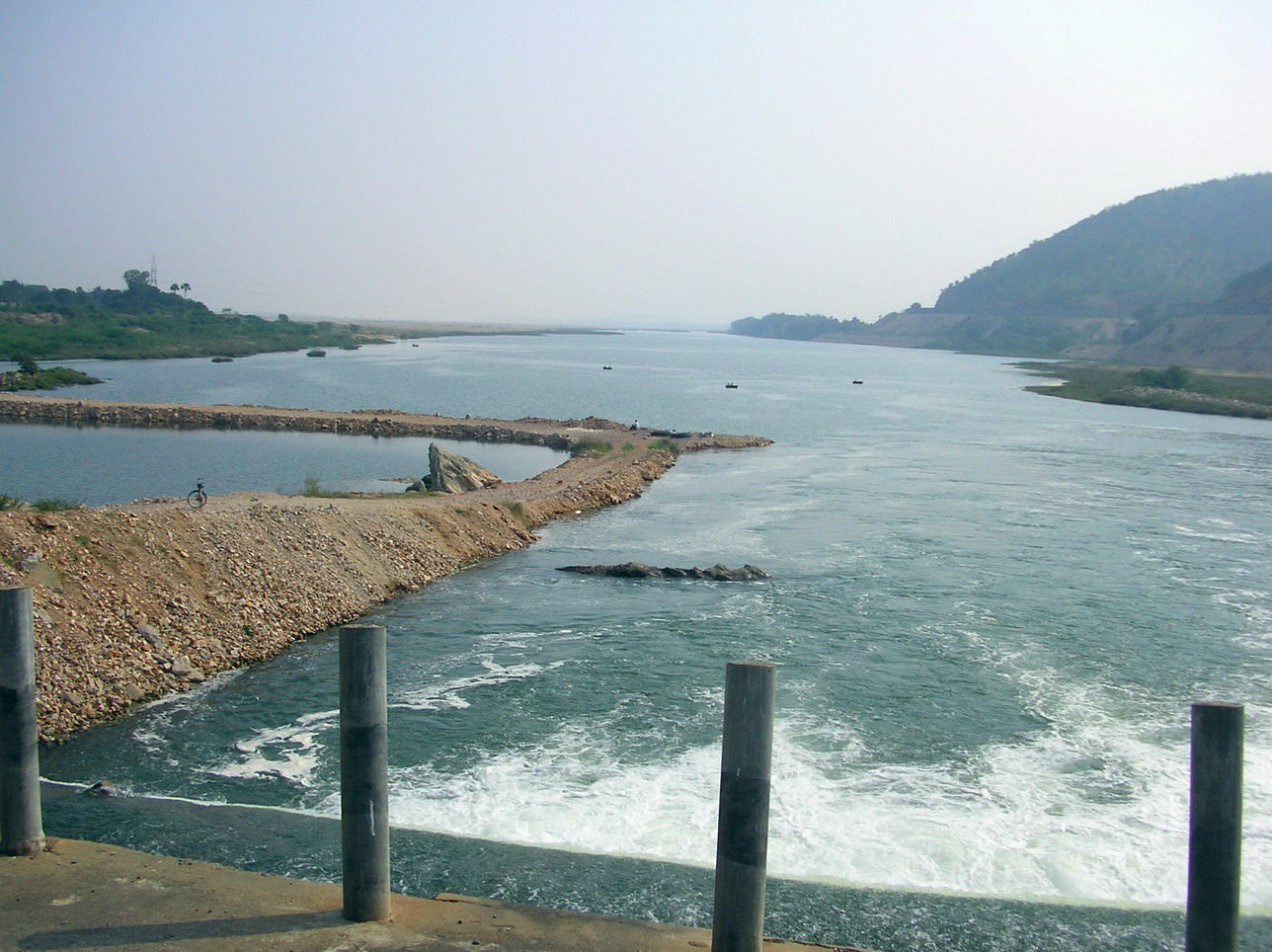
River Penna in Eastern Ghats

The watershed of the Penna and its tributaries covers part of the southern Deccan plateau, including most of the Rayalaseema region of Andhra Pradesh and part of Karnataka. The Kolar Plateau forms the divide between the Penna watershed and those of the Kaveri, Ponnaiyar, and Palar rivers to the south. The Penna drains the northern portion of the plateau, which includes parts of Kolar and Tumkur districts in Karnataka. The Krishna River and its tributaries drain the Deccan plateau to the west and north of the Penna's watershed, and the low Erramala hills forms the northern divide of the Penna basin. The upper watershed of the Penna includes Cuddapah District, central and eastern Anantapur District, the southern part of Kurnool District, northwestern Chittoor District.

Estuary

The estuary of the Penna river extends 7 km upstream from the Bay of Bengal. Tidal influence and salt water extends further upstream during the November to June dry season. Coastal dunes as high as 7 meters form around the river mouth. Upputeru tidal creek, 15 km in length, and Isakapalli lagoon, separated from the Bay of Bengal by the Isakapalli barrier island, 180 m long and up to 3 m high, form the main coastal wetlands.

The lower basin of the Penna is largely made up of ancient Archean rocks, principally granite and schist. The lower basin is made up of young sediments, including laterite and recent alluvium.

== Climate ==
The Penna basin has a dry tropical monsoon climate. The upper basin of the Penna is semi-arid, with summer temperatures of 25–45 °C and winter temperatures of 18–35 °C. Most of the rainfall is provided by the moisture-bearing southwest monsoon, which provides rain to most of India between June and September. The Penna basin lies in the rain shadow of the high Western Ghats ranges, which prevents much moisture from reaching the region. Post-monsoon cyclonic storms in the coastal region produce additional rain during September and October. The winter northeast monsoon, which provides rain between December and March, provides little rain to the upper basin and slightly more to the lower basin. It varies greatly from year to year in South India, sometimes bringing powerful cyclonic storms with flooding and high winds. The mean annual rainfall is 550 mm/year in Anantapur, and 900 mm/year in Nellore. The Penna basin suffered from a prolonged drought in the 1990s, which caused much misery among the regions farmers and generated political demands to build an aqueduct to bring water from the Krishna River to Rayalaseema.

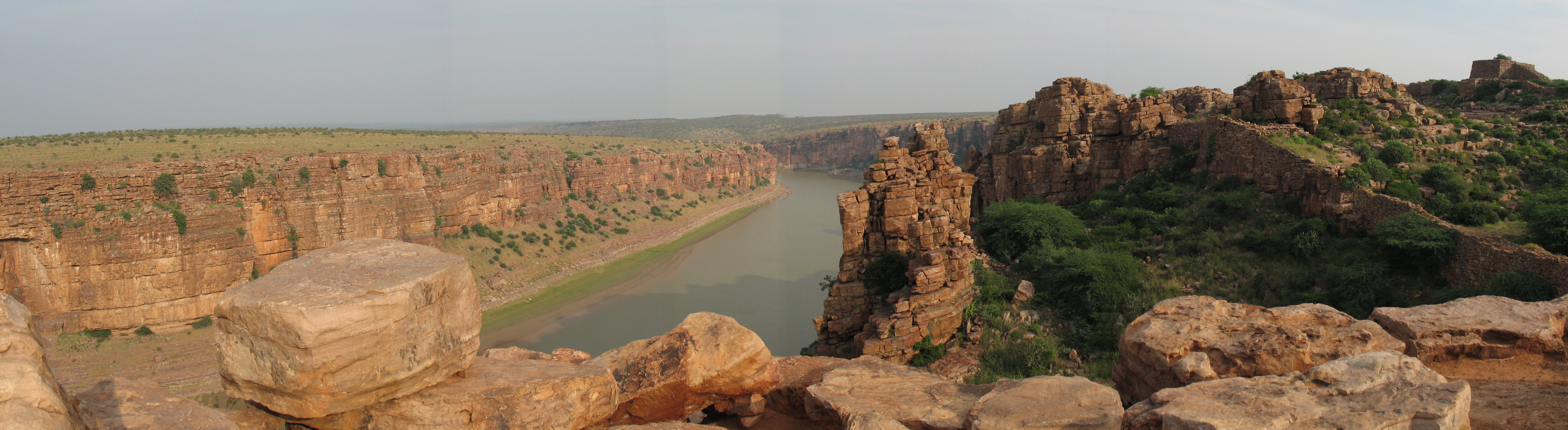
The Penna river near the Gandikota fort in Kadapa district of Andhra Pradesh

== Vegetation ==
The upper basin was formerly covered by tropical dry forest, thorn forest, and xeric shrublands. Most of the dry tropical forest has now disappeared, due to clearance for grazing and overharvesting the forests for timber and firewood, replaced by thorny scrub forest. The remnant forests of the Deccan are largely deciduous, dropping their leaves in the dry winter and spring months. The East Deccan dry evergreen forests of Coastal Andhra were evergreen, but these forests have largely been reduced to tiny remnant pockets.

== Port ==
The small boat port of Krishnapatnam used to lie on Upputeru creek, and has now been developed into a deep-water port. Buckingham Canal, a navigable man-made waterway that runs just behind the coast, allows small boats from the Penna to get to Chennai in the south and the Krishna River delta to the north. As of November 2015, Krishnapatnam Port is a major port situated at a distance of 24 km from Nellore city. Krishnapatnam is able to manage large ships with load capacities of 1,50,000 tonnes. It is one of the deepest port of India with 18 meters of draft.

== Literature ==
Telugu literature has flourished in the Penna basin which produced several well-known authors and poets like Kavibrahma Tikkana Somayajulu, Tallapaka Annamacharya, Pothuluri Veerabrahmendra Swamy, Yogi Vemana, Molla, Rallapalli Anantha Krishna Sharma, Vidwan Vishvam, and C. Ramakrishna Reddy. Vidhwan Viswam's penneti paata which means "a song of River Penna" is very popular in Andhra Pradesh and in Raayala Seema in particular, it is a topic of study in graduation course Telugu language paper . Ramakrishna Reddy's "penneti kathalu" represented the tragic and cultural life of the people of Penna valley. These stories are credited to be the best of their kind with the accent of local language presented effectively.

== Water use potential ==
The average annual water yield in river is nearly 6.316 billion cubic meters. All the water sources in the river basin are fully harnessed by constructing nearly 5 billion cubic meters capacity water storage reservoirs. Ground water is also extensively harnessed in the river basin beyond the long term sustainability.

The predominant rain fall is during North East Monsoon season whereas it is in South West monsoon in the adjoining Krishna river basin. This basin is situated geographically at lower elevation compared to the surrounding Krishna river basin. This feature facilitates water transfer from the adjoining Krishna basin. Water can be transferred from the adjoining Krishna basin into Penna basin up to 600 m MSL elevation with moderate water pumping (less than 100 m head). The river basin has extensive rain fed agriculture lands and good water storage sites for its all around development provided Krishna river water is imported to the basin. The monsoon flood waters of Krishna river during South West Monsoon months can be transferred for direct use in Penna basin without the need for water storage.

== Interstate aspects ==
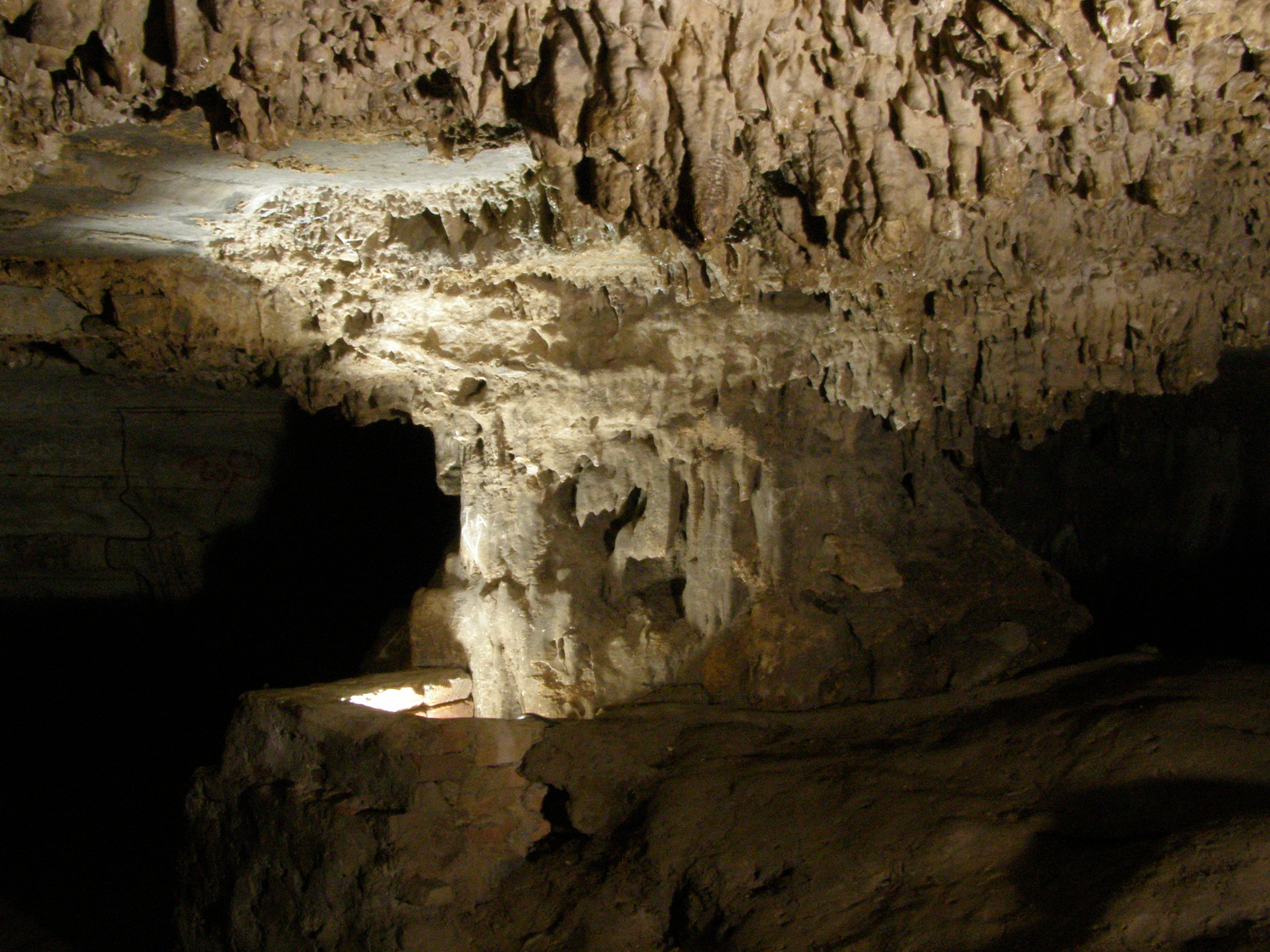
Banyan Tree formation inside Belum Caves

The Penna basin water apportionment is governed by colonial time water sharing agreement in the year 1892 and the Interstate River Water Disputes Act 1956. However the future development of Penna basin depends on Interstate water sharing agreements of Krishna river. Tungabhadra Dam which is located in Karnataka and a joint project of Andhra Pradesh and Karnataka, is the only gate way to transfer water from Krishna river to the uplands of Penna basin up to 600 m MSL. The low lands of Penna basin can be supplied with Krishna river from the Srisailam dam up to 250 m MSL. The outcome of ongoing Krishna Water Disputes Tribunal – II is very crucial for the future of Penna river basin.

== See also ==
- Krishna Water Disputes Tribunal
- Palar River
- Tungabhadra Dam
