= Jonnawada =

- Village
- Interactive map of Jonnawada
- Location in Andhra Pradesh, India Jonnawada (India)
- Coordinates: 14.4818°N 79.8906°E
- Country: India
- State: Andhra Pradesh
- District: Nellore

Population (2022)
  - Total: 9,000

Languages
  - Official: Telugu
- Time zone: UTC+5:30 (IST)
- Vehicle registration: AP

Jonnawada is a village in Buchireddypalem mandal, located in Nellore district of the Indian state of Andhra Pradesh. It is located on the banks of river Pennar.

== History ==
It is famous for Sri Mallikarjuna swamy and Kamakshi amma temple constructed in the year 1150. The goddess Kamakshi is believed as an incarnation of Shakti. A 'Sri Chakram' was installed
