= Erramala =

Erramala Hills
- The Erramalas
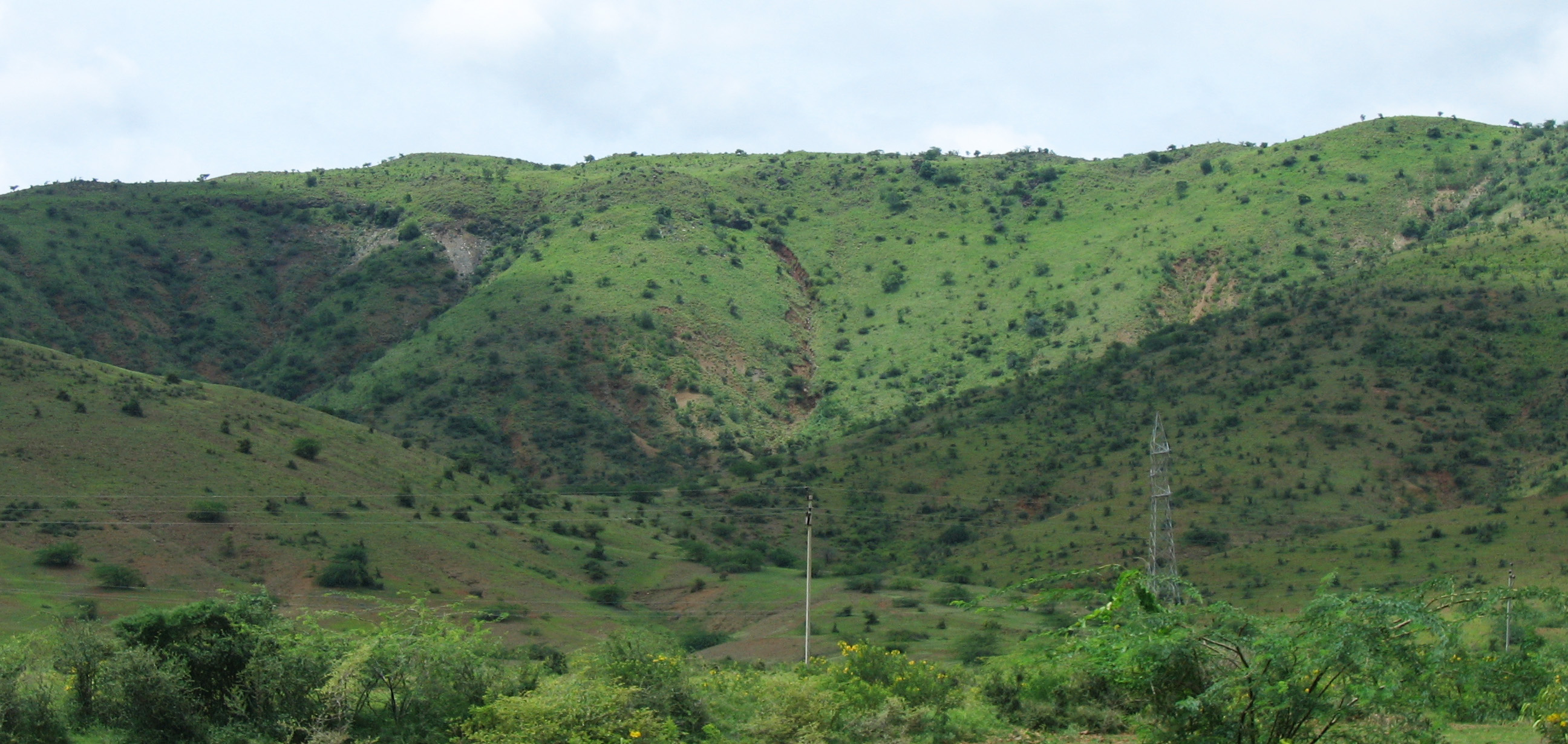
- The Erramalas during monsoon

Highest point
- Coordinates: 15°12′48″N 77°57′12″E

Geography
- Location within Andhra Pradesh
- Country: India
- State: Andhra Pradesh

Geology
- Rock age: Cambrian

The Erramala (Telugu: ఎఱ్ఱమల) are a range of low hills in southern India, in Kurnool district and Nandyal District of Andhra Pradesh state. The Erramala hills lie on the Deccan plateau, running east–west and dividing the basin of the Penna River to the south from the basin of the Krishna River to the north. The hill range may be extended along the Penna River basin in Kadapa district.

Some important visitor attractions along the Erramala Hills are as follows:

- Belum Caves
- Yadiki Caves
- Yaganti
- Gandikota
- Kalva Bugga
- Kolimigundla
- Tadipatri
- Orvakal Rocks
- Kethavaram Rock art site
- Banaganapalli
- Owk
- Betamcherla
- Koilakuntla

To the east lies the higher Nallamalla Hills.

== Gallery ==
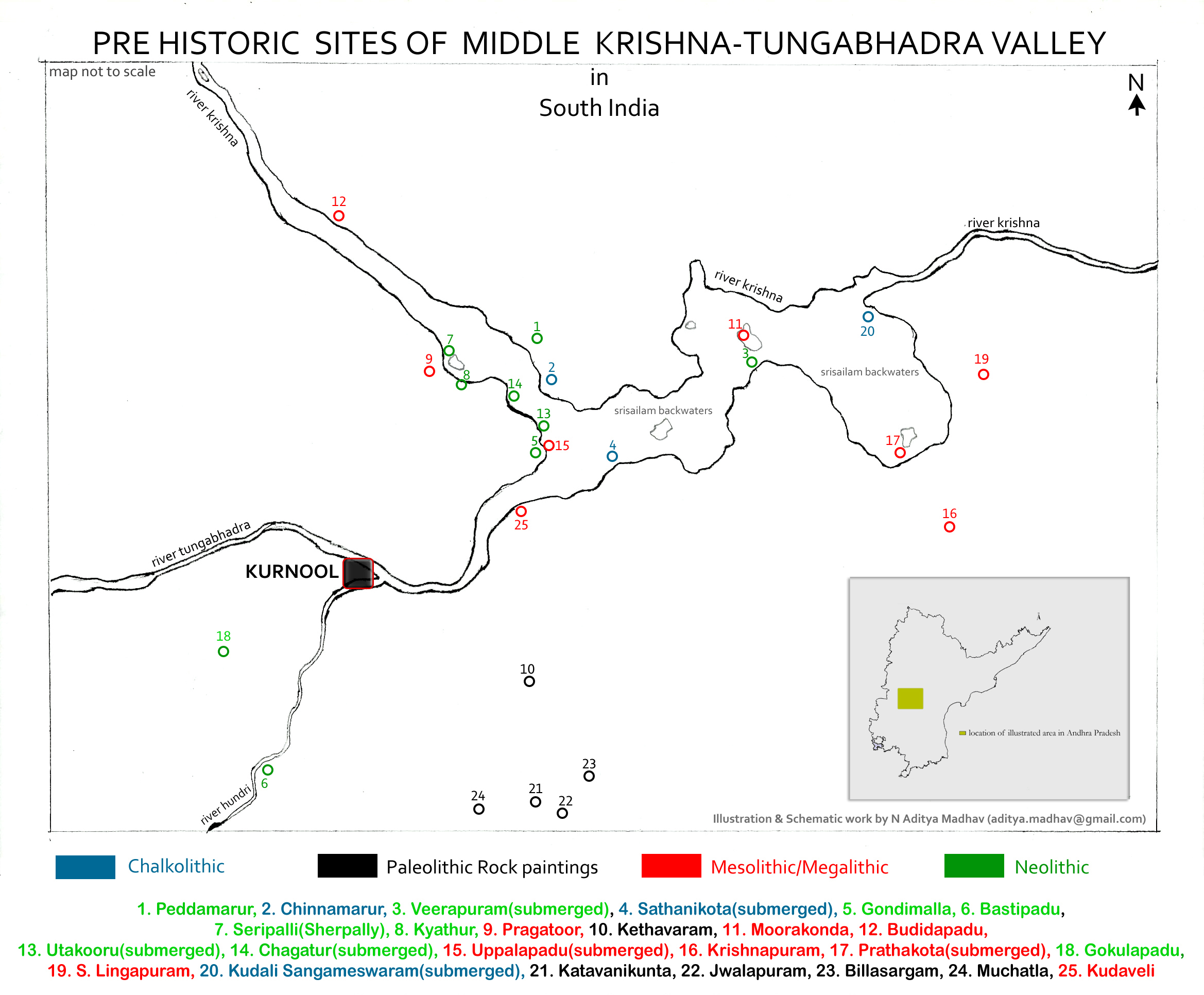
Pre Historic Mid Krishna-Tungabhadra Valley sites are located along the Erramala and Nallamala ranges

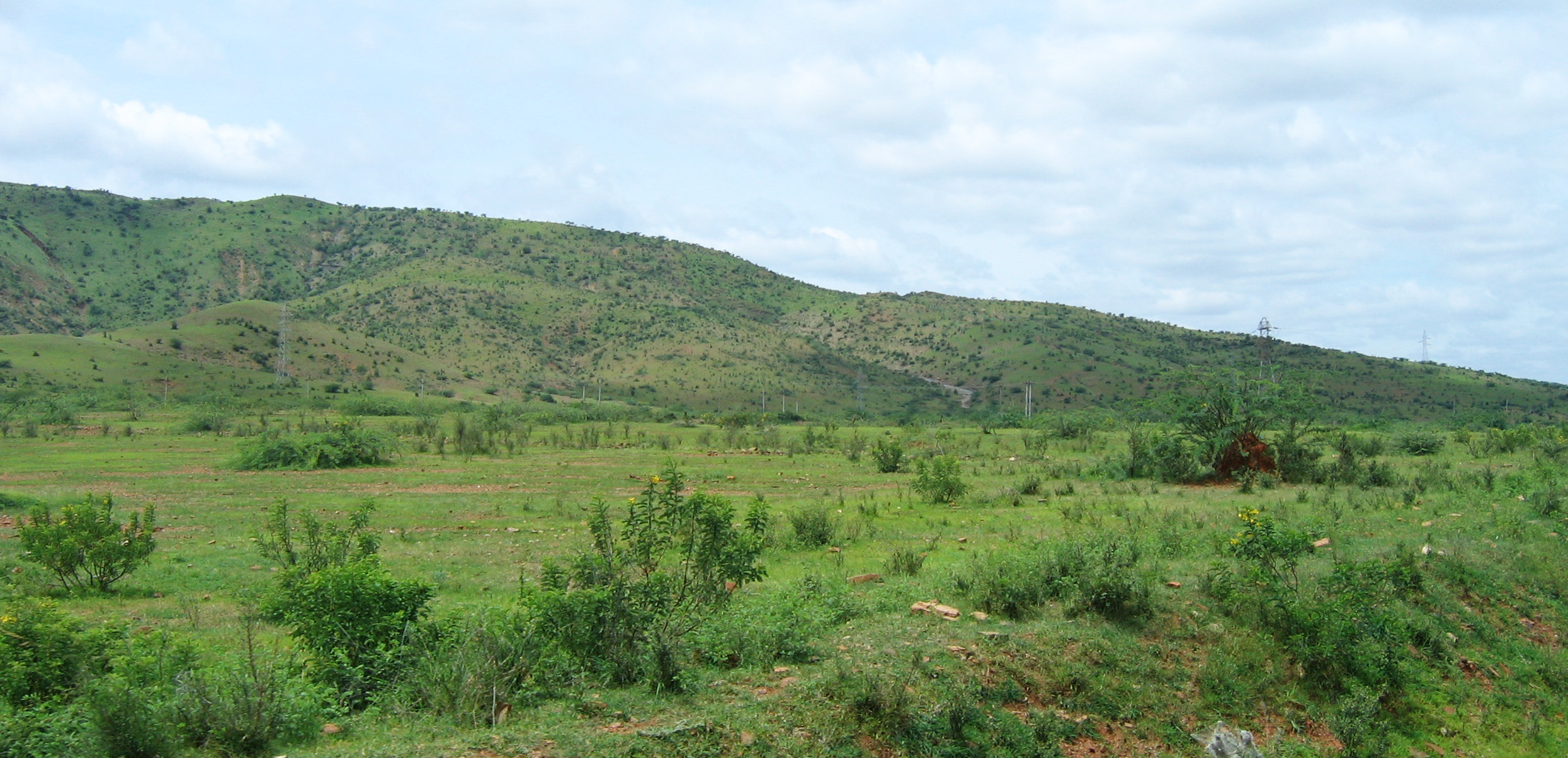
