= Kodavalur =

Kodavalur Kodavaluru
- Village
- Interactive map of Kodavalur
- Location in Andhra Pradesh, India
- Coordinates: 14.5667°N 80.0167°E
- Country: India
- State: Andhra Pradesh
- Elevation: 8 m (26 ft)

Population (2001)
  - Total: 46,563

Languages
  - Official: Telugu
- Time zone: UTC+5:30 (IST)
- Vehicle registration: AP 26

Kodavalur or Kodavaluru is a village in Nellore district in the state of Andhra Pradesh in India The Maldevi River runs through Kodavalur. It is Located in Kovur (Assembly constituency). The present M. L. A. Of Kovur (Assembly constituency) is nallapareddy prasanna kumar reddy.

== Geography ==
Kodavaluru is located at 14.5667°N 80.0167°E. It has an average elevation of 8 meters (29 feet).
