= Attirala =

Hatyarala Attirala
- Village
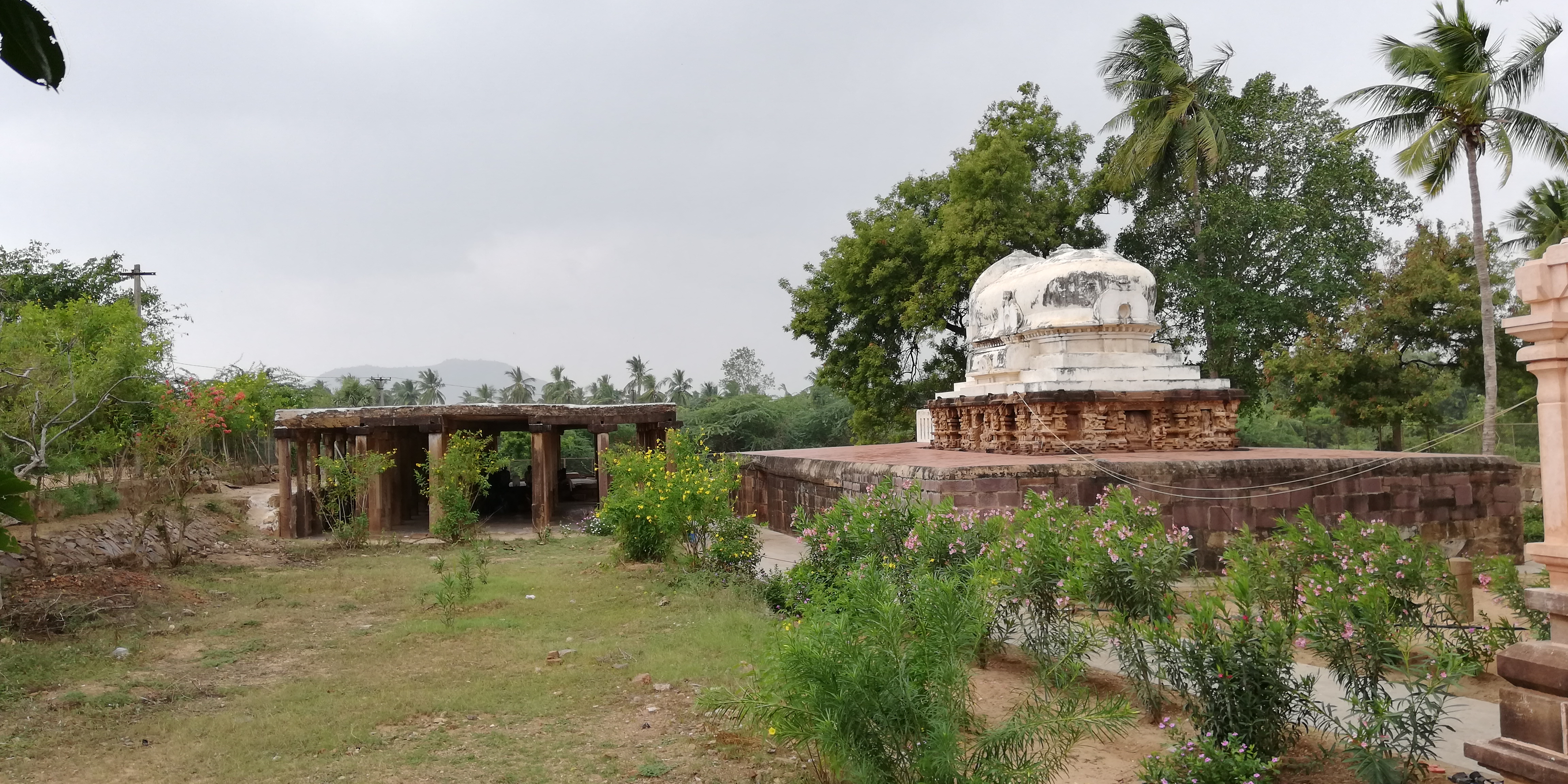
- Interactive map of Hatyarala
- Location in Andhra Pradesh, India Hatyarala (India)
- Coordinates: 14.243604°N 79.164734°E
- Country: India
- State: Andhra Pradesh
- District: Kadapa
- Mandal: Rajampet

Population (2023)
  - Total: 250

Languages
  - Official: Telugu
- Time zone: UTC+5:30 (IST)
- Vehicle registration: AP

Hatyaraala is a village in Rajampet mandal, Kadapa district of the Indian state of Andhra Pradesh. It is home to Parasurama Temple, which is said to date back to the 7th-8th century CE. It is situated on the eastern bank of the Cheyyeru river.
