= Yoga Nandeeshwara Temple =

Religion
- Affiliation: Hinduism
- District: Chikkaballapur
- Deity: Lord Shiva

Location
- Location: Nandi Hills
- State: Karnataka
- Country: India
- Geographic coordinates: 13.3686°N 77.6837°E

Yoga Nandeeshwara Temple is a Hindu temple in Nandi Hills or Nandidurg, Chikkaballapur district, Karnataka, India, is a dedicated to the Lord Shiva. It dates back to the Chola's Period.
