= Puttaparthi =

- Town, District headquarters
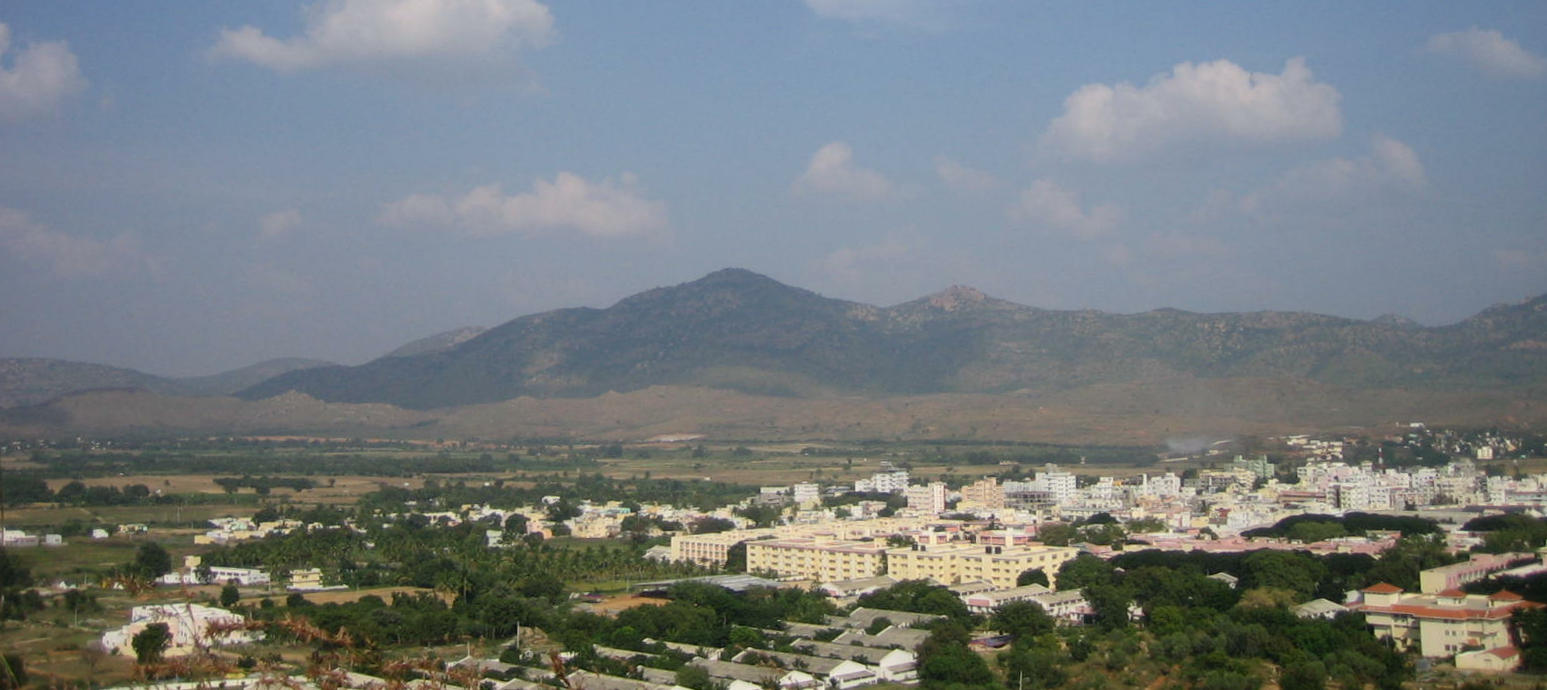
- Prasanthi Nilayam and surrounding areas

- Location within Andhra Pradesh Location within India
- Coordinates: 14.166°N 77.811°E
- Country: India
- State: Andhra Pradesh
- District: Sri Sathya Sai

Government
  - Body: Municipality
- Elevation: 475 m (1,558 ft)

Population (2011 census)
  - Total: 56,789

Languages
  - Official: Telugu
- Time zone: UTC+5:30 (IST)
- PIN: 515133, 515134
- Telephone code: 91-8555
- Vehicle registration: AP–40
- Website: www.sathyasai.org

Puttaparthi (IAST: Puṭṭaparthy) is a municipality and district headquarters of Sri Sathya Sai district of the Indian state of Andhra Pradesh. It is located in Puttaparthi mandal of Puttaparthi revenue division. The original name of Puttaparthi was Gollapalli. The town is located on the banks of Chitravathi River which is a tributary of Penna River, and is surrounded by undulating hills. It is widely known for the birthplace and deathplace of the Indian spiritual leader and guru Sathya Sai Baba and his ashram, Prasanthi Nilayam.

== Etymology ==
Puttaparthi means "village of anthills." A local legend says that a cobra snake cursed the village after being hit by a cowherder, which caused the proliferation of anthills in this area.

== Demographics ==
Residing in the state of Andhra Pradesh, the official language in Puttaparthi is Telugu. Various national and international languages are understood and spoken due to the presence of national and international devotees of Sathya Sai Baba.

According to the 2011 India census, Puttaparthi has a "total of 4368 residing families. The Puttaparthi village has population of 15088, of which 7370 are males, while 7718 are females... Puttaparthi village has higher literacy rate compared to Andhra Pradesh. In 2011, the literacy rate of Puttaparthi village was 70.43 % compared to 67.02 % of Andhra Pradesh. In Puttaparthi, male literacy stands at 78.12 % while female literacy rate was 63.20 %."

== Geography ==
=== Climate ===
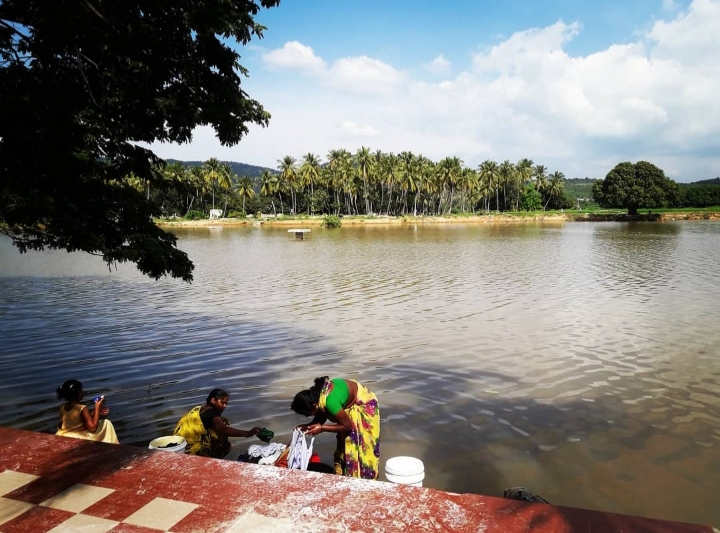
The Chitravathi River at Puttaparthi

The climate is generally hot and dry throughout the year, summer temperatures ranging from 34–42 °C (93–108 °F) and winter 22–27 °C (72–81 °F). The hotter months are from March until July and the milder months are from November until January.

The southwest monsoons play a major role in determining the climate. The northeast monsoons are responsible for about one-third of the total rainfall. Some rainfall may be expected during the months of July and August and again from October to December."

Puttaparthi is 475 meters (1558 feet) above sea level.

== Transport ==
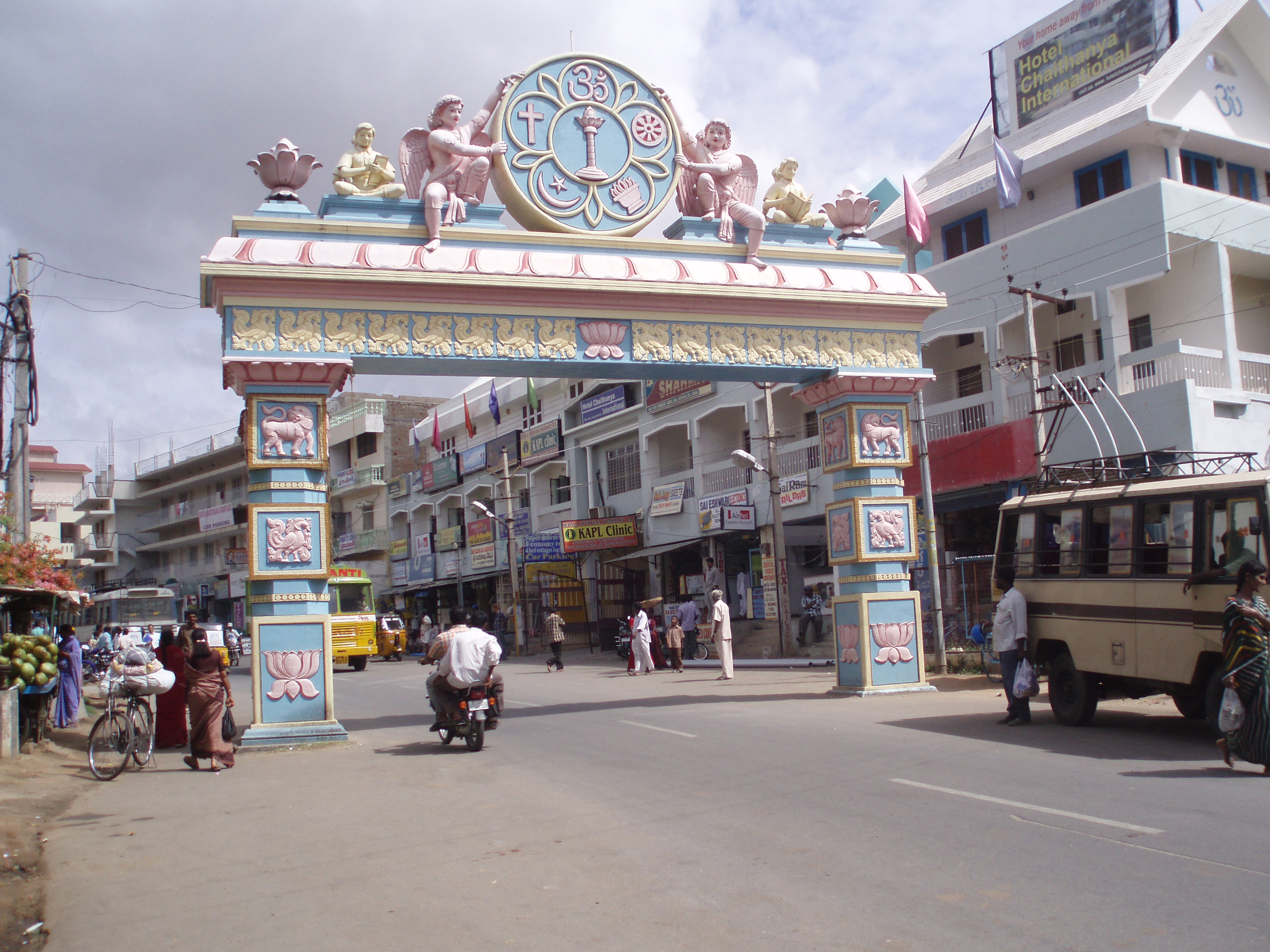
Entrance to Puttaparthi

=== Road ===
The Andhra Pradesh State Road Transport Corporation (APSRTC) operates bus services from Puttaparthi bus station. People visit Puttaparthi from all over India, and most State transport services also supply buses to Puttaparthi.

Puttaparthi is well connected by road to Anantapur (84 km), Bangalore (154 km), Vijayawada (507 km), Tirupati (227 km), Chennai (529 km) and all parts of Anantapur district.

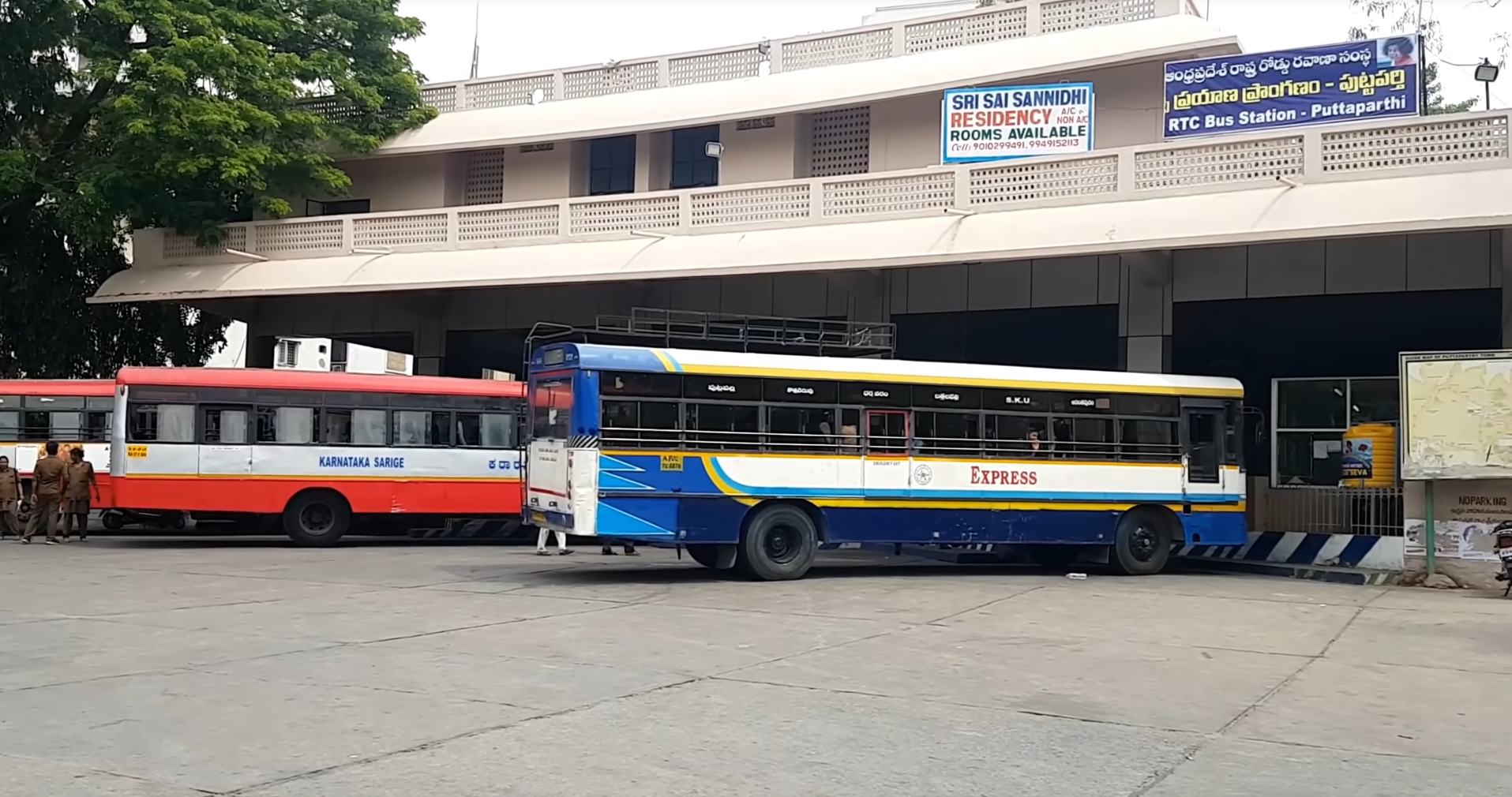
Buses at Puttaparthi APSRTC Bus station

=== Rail ===
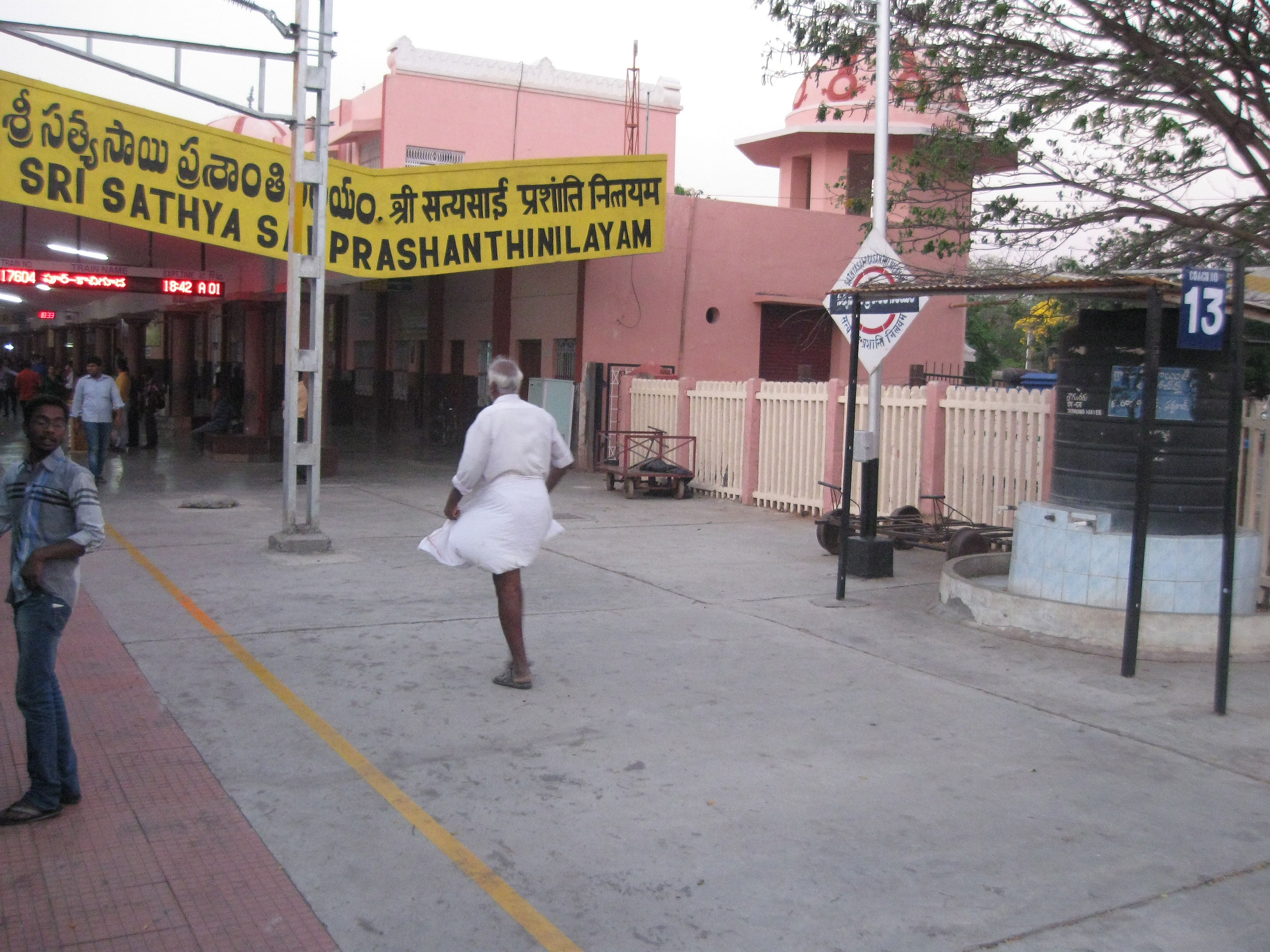
Prashanthi Nilayam Railway Station

Puttaparthi has a railway station named as Sri Sathya Sai Prasanthi Nilayam. The Railway station was inaugurated and became functional on November 23, 2000; Sathya Sai Baba's 74th birthday. It is about 8.6 km to the west of the ashram and 4 km south of the neighboring village of Kothacheruvu. This station falls under the Bangalore Division of the South Western Railway and lies on the Bangalore–Guntakal railway line. Travel time between the Rail station and Puttaparthi is approximately 15-25 minutes through various modes of transportation; cabs, autorickshaws and APSRTC buses. The town is connected directly by train to Bangalore, Secunderabad, Chennai, Vishakapatnam, Vijayawada, Coimbatore, Mumbai, New Delhi, Bhuvaneshwar and Kolkata. and Sri Sathya Sai Prasanthi Nilayam railway station is the 5th busiest station in Bangalore division of SWR.

=== Air ===
Puttaparthi Airport (IATA: PUT, ICAO: VOPN) is a domestic airport situated outside the village, 1 km from the Sathya Sai Baba Super Specialty Hospital. "It is a small airport with facilities for chartered flights rather than commercial aircraft. The airport was inaugurated on November 24, 1990 to serve the Super Speciality Hospital for emergency situations. The airstrip was constructed by L&T ECC. It was later extended to enable the operation of jet aircraft." It is owned by the Sri Sathya Sai Central Trust and is spread over 450 acres (1.8 km^{2}) of land, housing a runway that is 2,230 metres long.

The nearest International airport is the Kempegowda International Airport at Devanahalli, a suburb of Bangalore which is about 119 km from Puttaparthi.

== Sports ==
Sri Sathya Sai International Centre for Sports and Sri Sathya Sai Hill View Stadium are two sporting facilities in Puttaparthi. Hill View Stadium was established in 1985 and is mainly used for cricket with a capacity of 50,000 people. The International Centre for Sports was established in 2006 with indoor facilities for Basketball, Volleyball, Tennis, Squash, Table Tennis, Badminton, Gymnastics and Yoga/Aerobics.

=== Sri Sathya Sai Super Speciality Hospital, Puttaparthi ===
The Sri Sathya Sai Institute of Higher Medical Sciences, Prasanthigram (SSSIHMS), near Puttaparti, Andhra Pradesh, is a 300 - bedded tertiary care hub spanning 320,000 square feet. It features 14 operating theatres, two cardiac catheterization labs, five in-patient wards, an ICU, and a 24 x 7 emergency unit. Advanced diagnostics include CT/MRI scanners, ultrasound, and automated labs for biochemistry, pathology, and microbiology. Support includes a blood bank and dietary. Specialties cover cardiology, CTVS, urology, ophthalmology, plastic surgery, gastroenterology, and orthopaedics, led by 200+ expert doctors. In 2024, the SSi Mantra Robotic Surgery System was added for precise, minimally invasive procedures. DNB training and ISRO telemedicine enhance its academic and outreach.

Free Treatment Model: Inaugurated on 22 November 1991 by Bhagwan Sri Sathya Sai Baba, it pioneered totally free care; no bills, no cash counters—funded by donations. Over 33 years, it delivered 76 Lakh OPD visits, 5,25,000 surgeries, serving 66% low-income patients (< ₹30,000/year). Rooted in Seva, it provides world-class treatment.

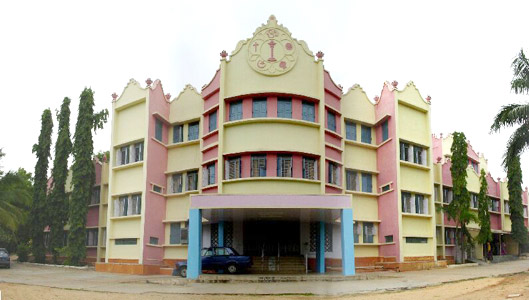
Sri Sathya Sai General Hospital, Prashanti Nilayam

=== Sri Sathya Sai General Hospital, Prasanthi Nilayam ===
The Sri Sathya Sai General Hospital in Prasanthi Nilayam, near Puttaparthi, was established in 1956 by Bhagwan Sri Sathya Sai Baba to provide free primary healthcare to rural poor. This 120-bed facility offers general medicine, surgery, paediatrics, obstetrics, and diagnostics, serving as a referral point to the adjacent Super Speciality Hospital.
