= Nadari River =

River in India

The Nadari River runs through the Indian states of Andhra Pradesh and Tamil Nadu. It originates in the Velikonda mountains near Puttur and runs for about 100 kilometres (62 mi) through Tirupati and Thiruvallur districts before joining the Buckingham Canal, which joins the Bay of Bengal near Ennore.
