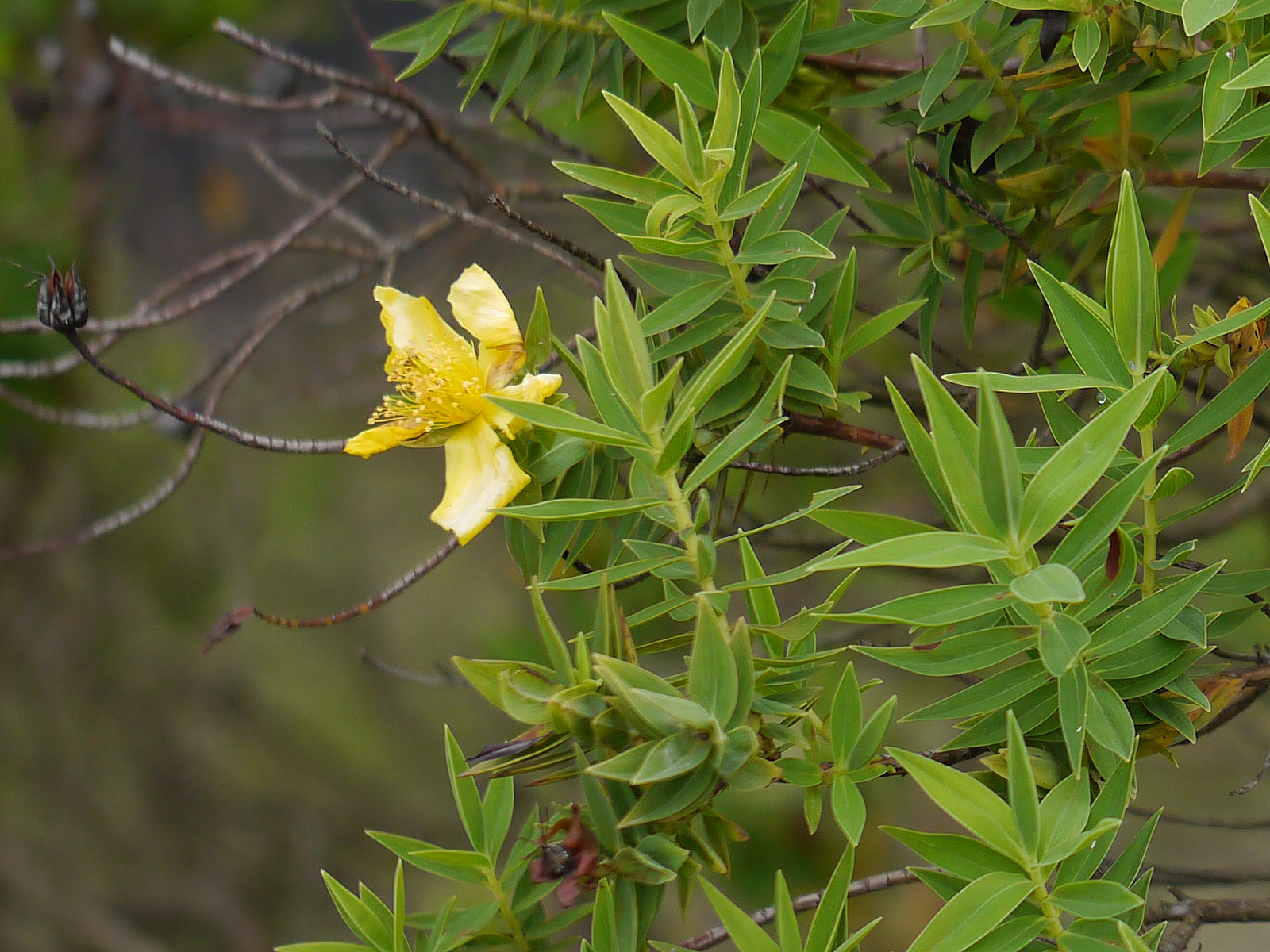

Scientific classification
- Kingdom: Plantae
- Clade: Embryophytes
- Clade: Tracheophytes
- Clade: Spermatophytes
- Clade: Angiosperms
- Clade: Eudicots
- Clade: Rosids
- Order: Malpighiales
- Family: Hypericaceae
- Genus: Hypericum
- Species: H. mysurense

Binomial name
- Hypericum mysurense B.Heyne

= Hypericum mysurense =

Species of flowering plant

Hypericum mysurense is a species of flowering plant in the Hypericaceae family. It is primarily found at high elevations in the Western Ghats of India and the mountains of Sri Lanka, but was also reported from Socotra by Isaac Bayley Balfour in the 19th century. It was studied to improve understanding of endosperm formation in Hypericum, and the identification of a number of xanthone derivatives from this species contributed to the chemotaxonomic description of subfamily Hypericoideae.

Hypericum mysurense has been used to treat wounds as part of traditional medicine. Some research into the possibility of antiherpetic properties in H. mysurense extracts has been performed.
