= Maldevi River =

River in India

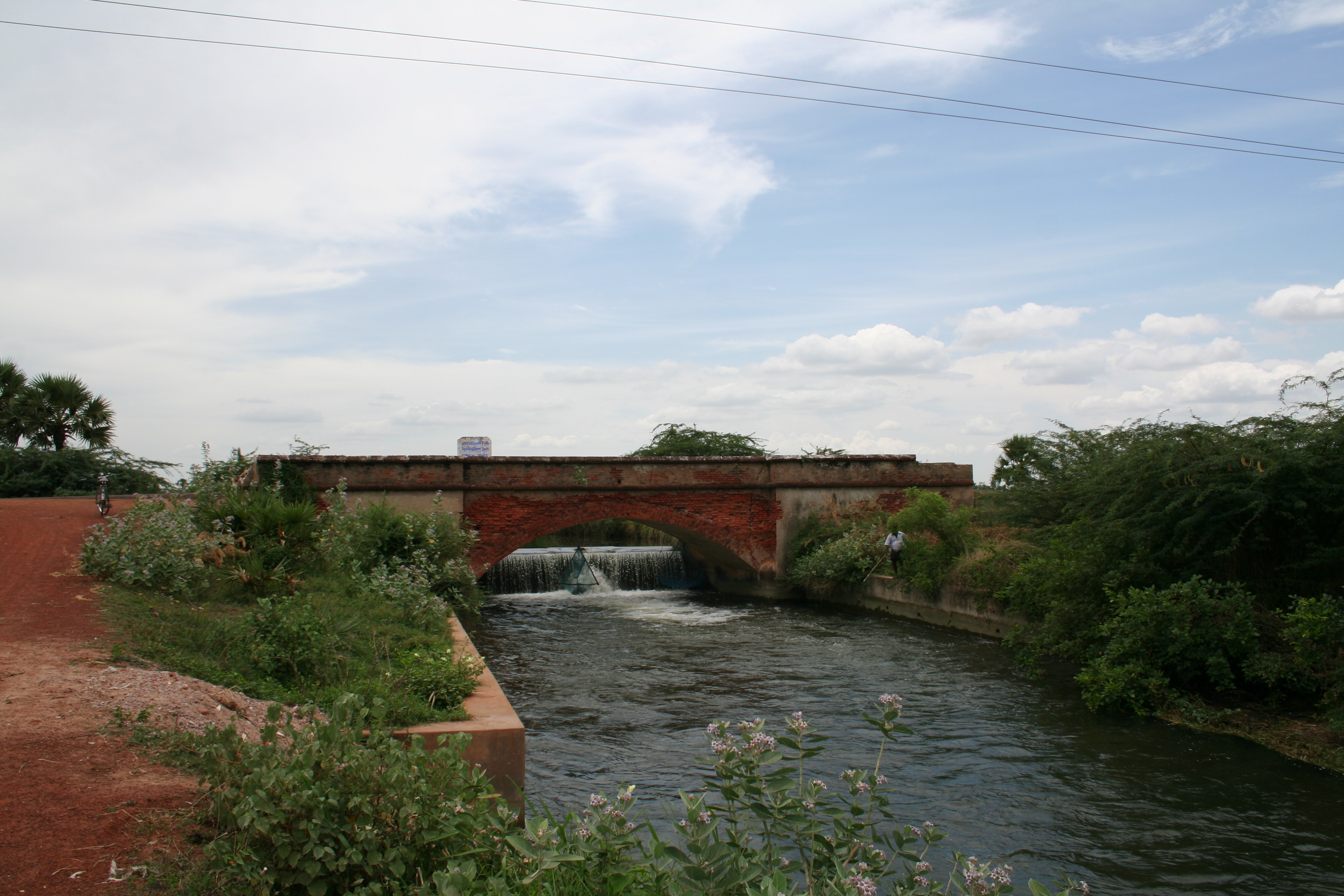
The River Maldevi, and a bridge, in Yellayapalem

The Maldevi is a river which runs through the Nellore district in the Indian state of Andhra Pradesh. It empties into the Pennar river.

The Vijayanagara Empire built the Anantraj Sagar water storage tank using a 1.37 km long dam on this river.
