= Kundu River =

River in India

Kunderu
- Course of Kunderu

Location
- Country: India
- State: Andhra Pradesh

Physical characteristics
- Mouth: Penna River
- Length: 215 km (134 mi)

Basin features
- Tributaries
  - left: Vekkileru, Paleru Vanka, Galeru, Maddula Eru, Paleru.
  - right: Pala Vaagu, Erra Vaagu, Tigaleru, Jurreru

The Kundu River also known as Kunderu, Kumudvathi is a tributary of the Penna River in the Rayalaseema region of Andhra Pradesh, India. Originating as a spring near the village of Uppalapadu in Orvakal Mandal of Kurnool District, it flows through Nandyal district and goes through many changes before merging with the Penna at Kamalapuram of Kadapa District. It is known for frequent floods that bring heavy damage to the Nandyal and Koilkuntla areas, and hence it is popularly called the "Sorrow of Nandyal." But nowadays Nandyal town became a big town with huge population so that the drainage water is discharged to the Kundu river without prior treatment. Industrialists focused their vision at more and more profits and they polluted the river to the maximum extent. The villagers who are living at down flow of the river from Nandyala are suffering with different skin diseases. The pollution impacts even animals health too. In ancient times this river was known as the Kumudvathi. There is a saying in Rayalaseema that whoever drinks the water of the Kundu will gain enormous courage to face enemies. The valley of the Kundu is known as Renadu and is symbolic of the term "Renati Pourusham."

== Passage ==
The Kundu River drains around 6,000 acres (24 km^{2}) in its flood plains, consisting of 41 villages. It covers 6 assembly constituencies in Kurnool and Kadapa districts. Many streams and brooks, including the Galeru, Paaleru, Nippuvaagu and Sankalavaagu, are the main sources of flood water. Galeru and Paaleru in particular bring heavy flood water from the Nallamala hills. The Kundu is ferocious in the rainy season, particularly during cyclones.

== Floods ==
The villages and the Nandyal town located close to the Kundu River are affected by frequent floods, incurring heavy losses to properties and farmlands. The farmers in this belt are not guaranteed crops until harvested, as no one can predict the precise arrival of floods. From July to December there are several instances of flooding on this river. In 1994 floods incurred around ₨.60 crores of loss. On 20 August 2000, around midnight, the people of Nandyal were inundated with flood water. Almost everyone in the town experienced some loss of property, and 10 people died. In the much-publicised Kurnool floods of 2009, Nandyal was cut off from civilisation for 5 days as the flooded Kundu encircled the entire town.

=== Protests ===
The people of Nandyal and the farmers of Kundu plains took to protest to highlight the problem. There has been a widespread demand to construct a protective wall along the passage of Kundu at the outskirts of Nandyal. Ex-MLA of Koilkuntla Late Karra Subba Reddy and retired chief engineer B.V. Reddy suggested some solutions to the government, but in vain. Kundu Porata Samithi, under the leadership of Kamini Venugopala Reddy, have been demanding to construct check dams and storage reservoirs across the rivulets wherever possible. But the technicality of this proposal is yet to be surveyed and certified by the engineers. The well-known engineer Dr. Sri Rami Reddy submitted a permanent formula citing solutions to prevent floods and to use the water effectively for the entire region of Rayalaseema. His formula also had some suggestions regarding the Kundu River. A peculiar characteristic of Kundu Valley is that there is no underground drinking water up to 10 km on each side of the river bank. If a bore well is dug within these limits, water containing high fluoride and sulphates may come out of the wells.

The flood waters diverted from Krishna River from Srisailam reservoir has to reach main Penna River via Kundu river valley only. As the Kundu River plains is prone to flooding at high water discharge, it has become a limiting factor for diverting the Krishna river flood waters to water starved Penna River via Pothireddipadu head regulator.
