= Cheyyeru River =

River in India

Coordinates: 14°26′N 79°10′E

Cheyyeru in the southern Indian state of Andhra Pradesh is a tributary of the Penneru river.

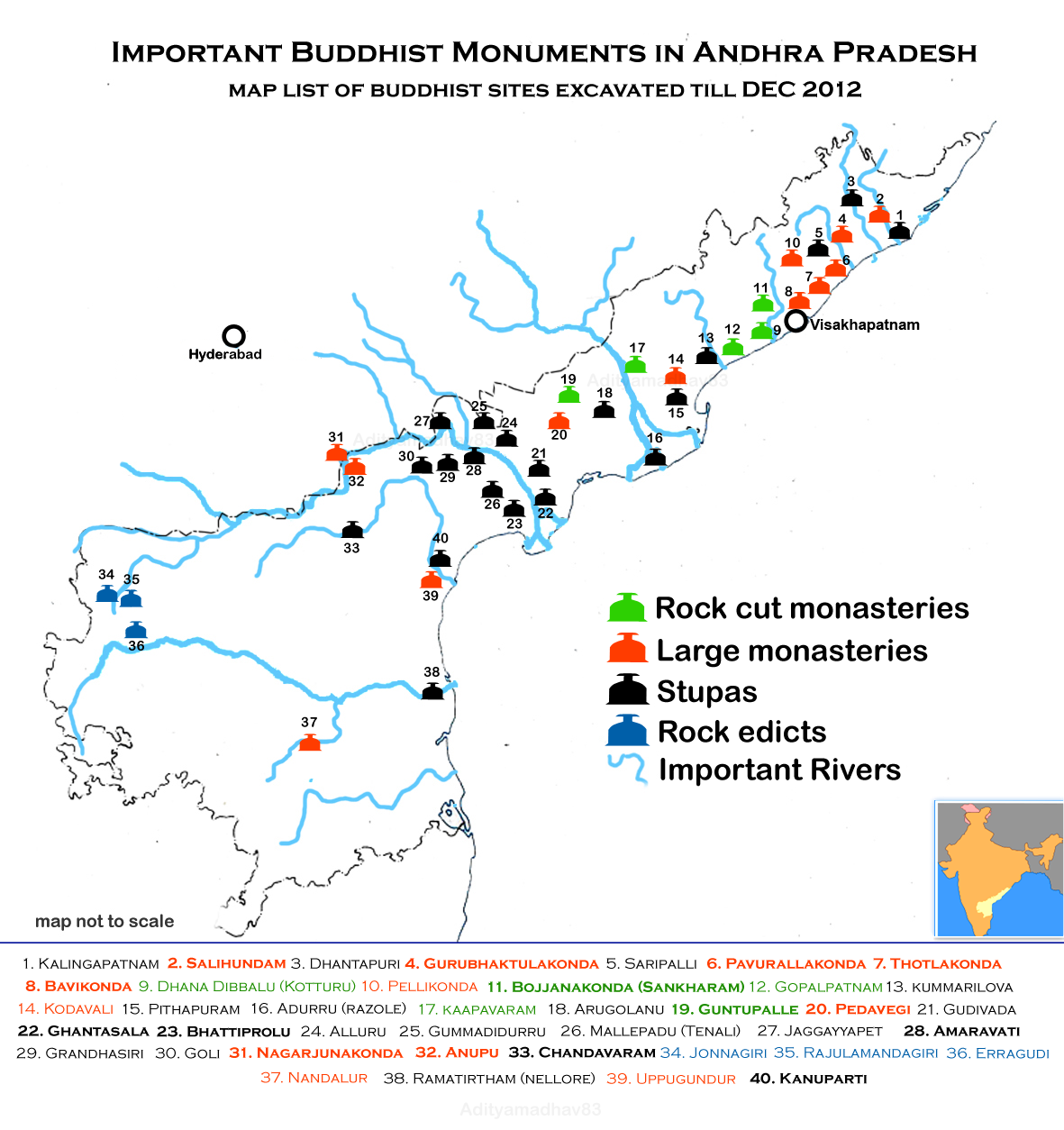
Cheyyeru River has Nandalur Buddhist site on its bank

== Course ==
The Cheyyeru is formed by the confluence of the rivers Bahuda and Pincha that originate in Andhra Pradesh. The two streams join at Rayavaram to form the Cheyyeru which then flows for 87 km before joining the Penneru as a right bank tributary at Gundlamada in the Sidhout taluk of Kadapa district, draining a total area of 7,325 km^{2}. The Gunjana river is a tributary of the Cheyyeru and along the Gunjana valley several paleolithic settlements have been discovered. There are several gorges on the river including one after the confluence of its headstreams and the Balarajupalle gorge. The Cheyair series of rocks in the Cudappah rock system of the Eastern Ghats, consisting largely of shales, is named after the Cheyyeru river.

== Waterworks ==
The Cheyyeru project comprising the 409 metre long Annamayya earthen dam that provides irrigation facilities to its catchment zone is on this river in the Rajampet mandal of Kadapa district. The Togurpet project, also in the Kadapa district, is also on the Cheyyeru and was completed during the Fourth Five-Year Plan period. Percolation tanks have been developed on the river at Nandalur to augment irrigation facilities in Kadapa.

== Important places ==
Attirala is a temple town on the Cheyyeru that is associated with several myths. It is believed that the sage Parasurama in Hinduism did penance for his sin of matricide here and that Likhita, the brother of the sage Sankha had his severed hands restored to him after bathing in the river. Attirala houses a Parasurama temple and temples dedicated to Gadadhara and Treteshwara. Many members of the transgender community visit Attirala to pray for their rebirth as regular human beings and to atone for their sins.
