= Mudigubba =

- Village
- Location in Andhra Pradesh, India Mudigubba (India)
- Coordinates: 14.3333°N 77.9833°E
- Country: India
- State: Andhra Pradesh
- District: Sri Sathya Sai
- Mandal H.Q: Mudigubba
- Elevation: 395 m (1,296 ft)

Population (2001)
  - Total: 58,212

Languages
  - Official: Telugu
- Time zone: UTC+5:30 (IST)
- Postal code: 515511
- Vehicle registration: AP

Mudigubba is a town and mandal headquarters in Sri Sathya Sai district of the Indian state of Andhra Pradesh. It is located in Mudigubba mandal of Dharmavaram revenue division.

== Geography ==
Mudigubba is located at 14.3333°N 77.9833°E. It has an average elevation of 395 metres (1299 ft)

== Demographics ==
According to Indian census, 2001 the demographic details of Mudigubba mandal is as follows:

- Total Population: 58,212 in 13,894 Households.
- Male Population: 29,834 and Female Population: 28,378
- Children Under 6-years of age: 6,749 (Boys - 3,520 and Girls – 3,229)
- Total Literates: 26,691
