= Rayavaram, Kadapa district =

Rayavaram is a village in Kadapa district in the state of Andhra Pradesh in India.

Situated 30 km from Rayachoti.

ATM available - TATA INDICASH
