= Velikonda Range =

Mountain range in India

Coordinates: 14°45′N 79°10′E

The Velikonda Range or Velikonda Hills is a low mountain range, that form part of the Eastern Ghats mountain range system, in eastern India.

The Velikonda Range is located in the south-eastern part of Andhra Pradesh state.
