= Papagni River =

Coordinates: 14°35′N 78°42′E

Papagni
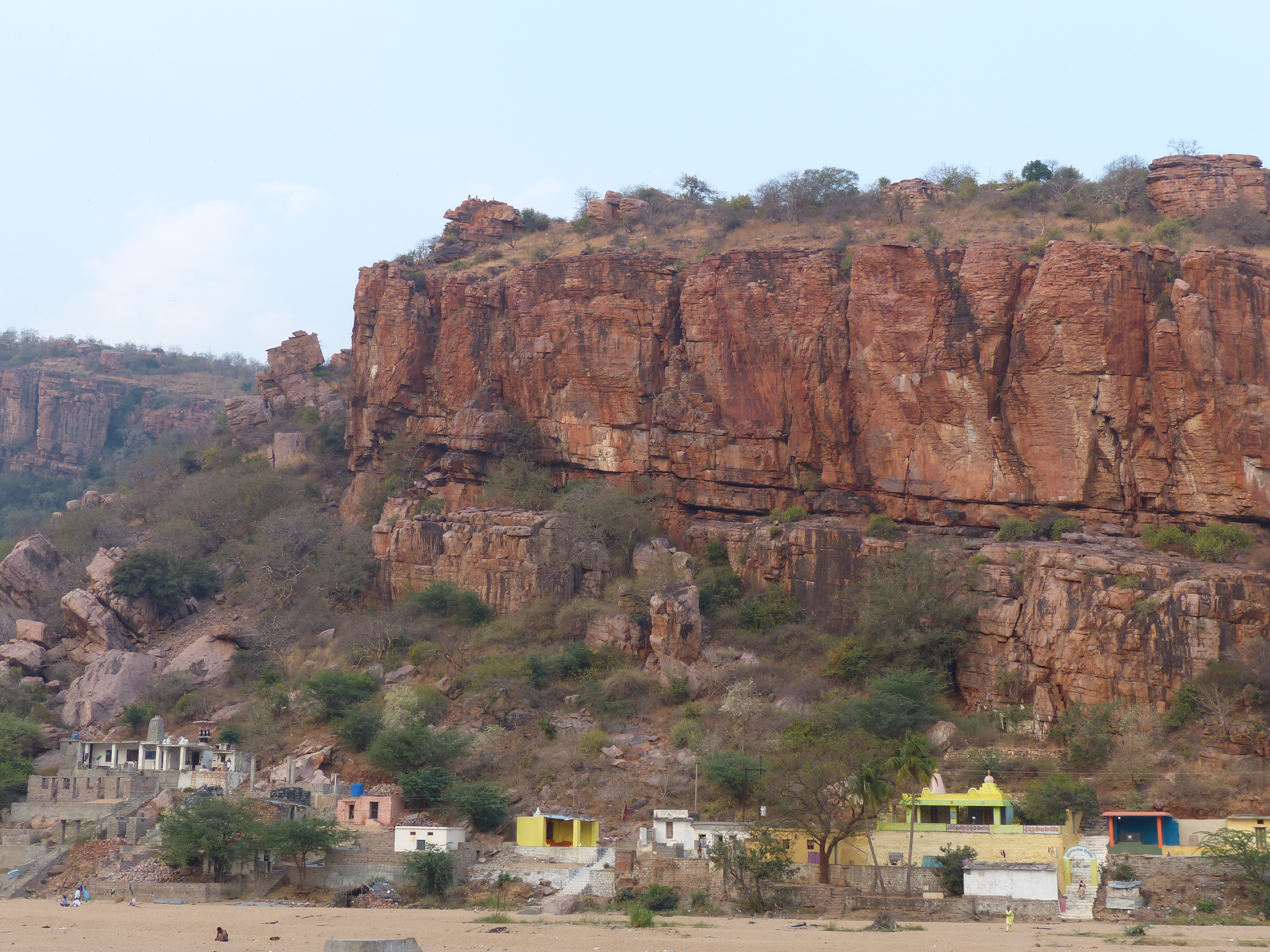
- River bank of Papagni at Gandi Kshetram

Location
- Country: India
- State: Andhra Pradesh

Physical characteristics
- Mouth: Penna River
- Length: 200 km (120 mi)

Papagni River is a non-perennial, inter-state river in southern India that flows through the states of Karnataka and Andhra Pradesh. It is a right bank tributary of the Pennar river.

== Etymology ==
Pāpāgni is a compound of the words pāpa (meaning sin) and agni (meaning fire). According to legend a king who once killed an innocent tribal chieftain of the Chenchus, who live in this region, was afflicted by leprosy as punishment for his sin. He was supposedly cured of the affliction only after he undertook penance in the Papagni valley and took a dip in the river upon which the river is said to have turned his sins to ashes thus acquiring for itself the name Pāpāgni.

== Course ==
The Papagni originates in the Nandi Hills of Chikkaballapur district in Karnataka. It is a non-perennial river that is rainfed with its basin receiving 60–80 cm of rainfall annually. It traverses through a region of granitic deposits and red soil that is frequently affected by soil erosion. It drains the districts of Kolar in Karnataka and the districts of Chittoor, Anantapur and Kadapa in Andhra Pradesh. The basin covers an area of 8,250 km^{2}. and drains 30 mandals of which 21 lie in the Rayalseema region of Andhra Pradesh. It joins the Pennar near Kamalapuram in Andhra Pradesh.

== Land use pattern ==
Although flowing through a largely semi-arid region, wet cultivation including that of paddy and wheat is undertaken along the Papagni's banks. Black, loamy and red soils are found in the river basin area. 60% of the river basin comprises cultivated, fallow and culturable wastelands while another 15% is under forests. The forests here are mostly dry deciduous forests, thorn forests and scrub. The yellow-throated bulbul, starred tortoise, red sand boa and the Kolar leaf-nosed bat are among the major threatened species of fauna found here.

== Environmental issues ==
The river has faced serious damage in recent years due to various human activities. Unregulated and excessive sand mining in the riverbed has led to falling groundwater levels in the river basin, besides damaging civil structures on and near the river and has led to both a deepening of the riverbed and deterioration in the quality of groundwater. Restoration activities under the Foundation for Ecological Security through community participation towards maintenance of check dams, curbing grazing and felling of trees has however led to a revival of the river leading to rising groundwater levels and an increase in tree cover. The success with the Papagni is now being seen as a possible model for the rejuvenation of the Arkavathy river in Karnataka.
