= List of dams and reservoirs in Andhra Pradesh =

The following are the major dams and reservoirs located in Andhra Pradesh. The Andhra Pradesh is well known for its fertile lands, plains and has the most Dams, Reservoirs, Lakes, Ponds, Wells, and Canals across Eastern Ghats of India. It also has second largest river delta consisting river systems of Krishna and Godavari rivers in the country.

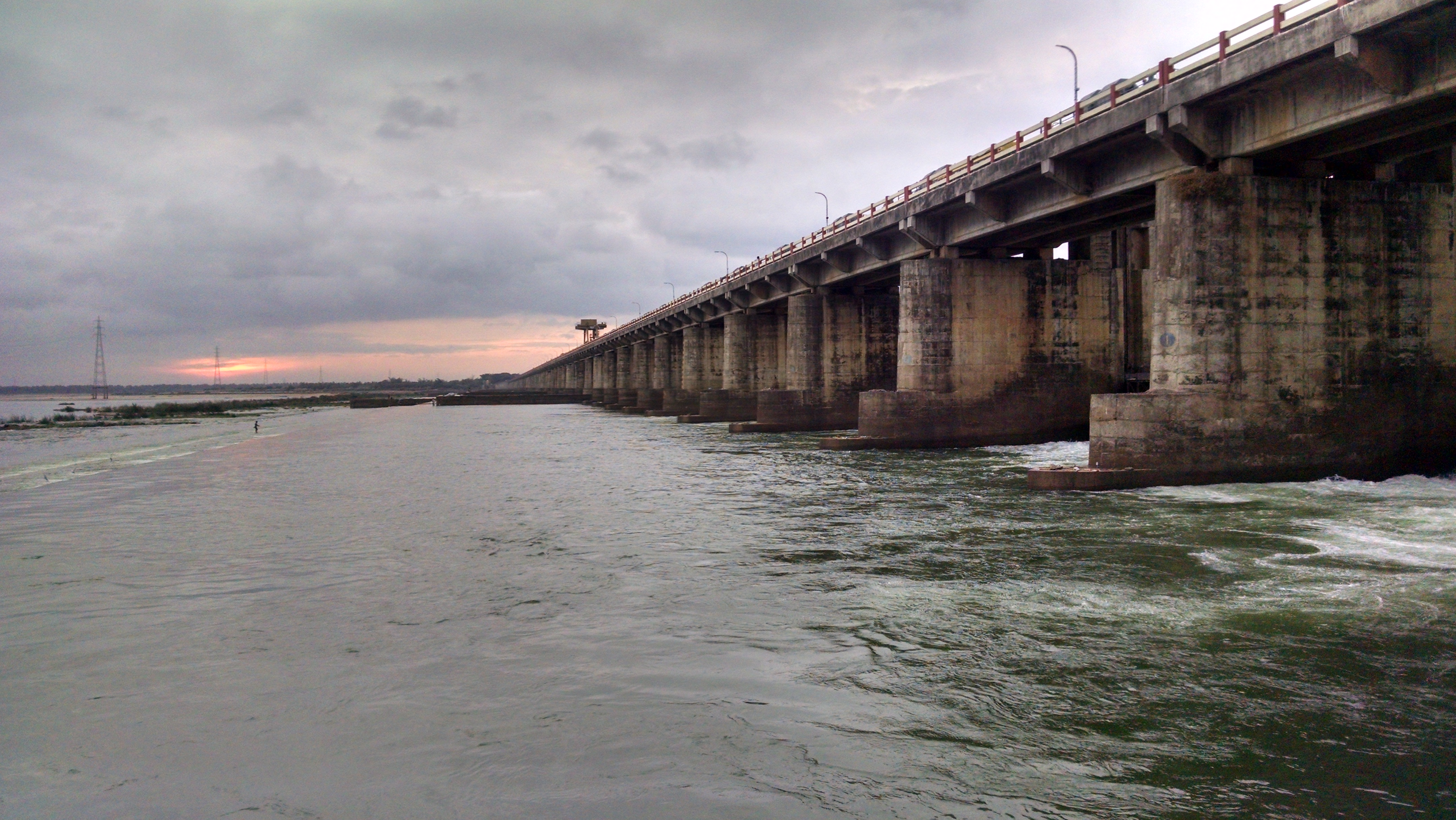
Dowleswaram Barrage flow near Rajamahendravaram, East Godavari district

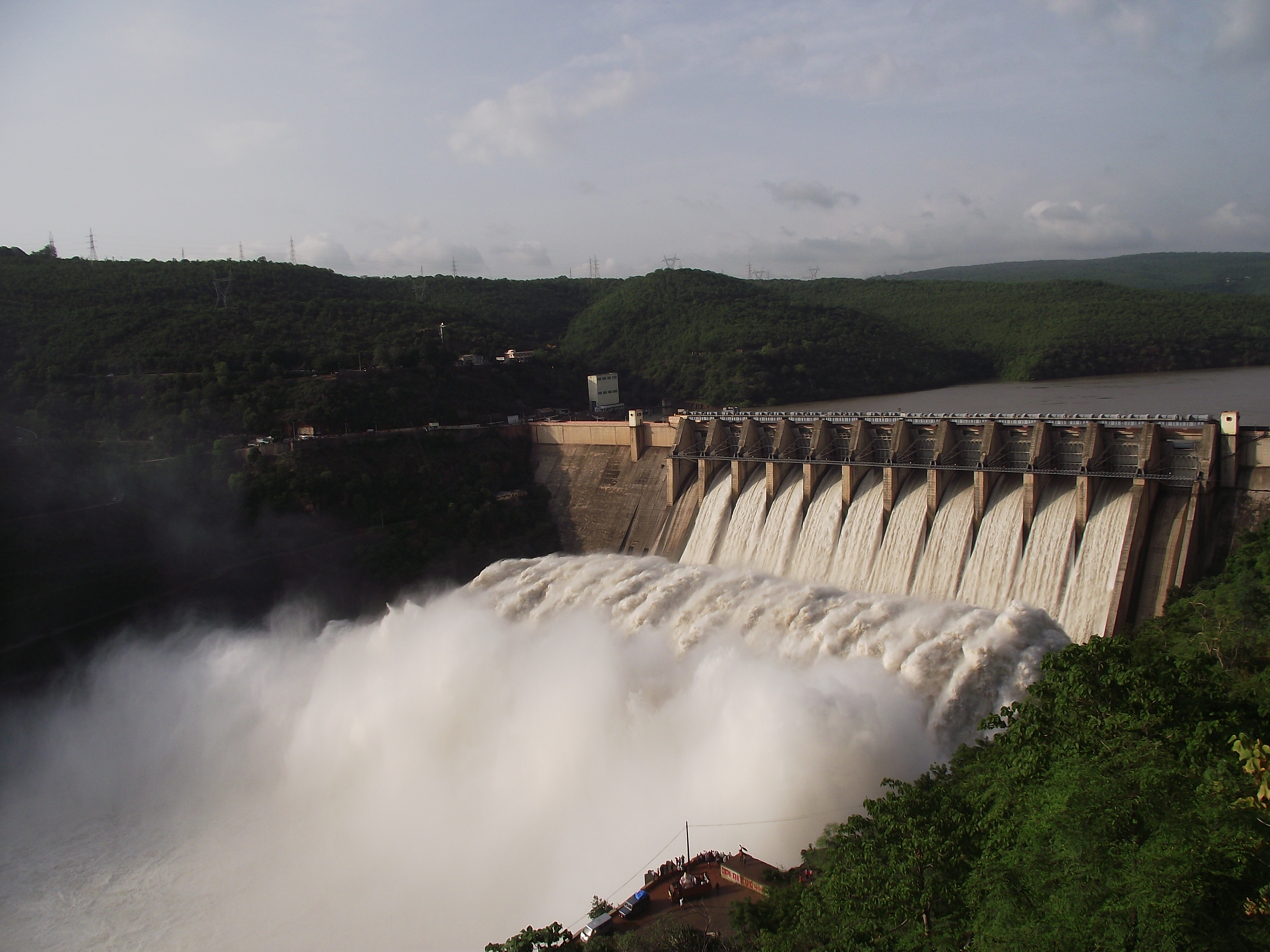
Srisailam Dam flow at Srisailam, Nandyal district

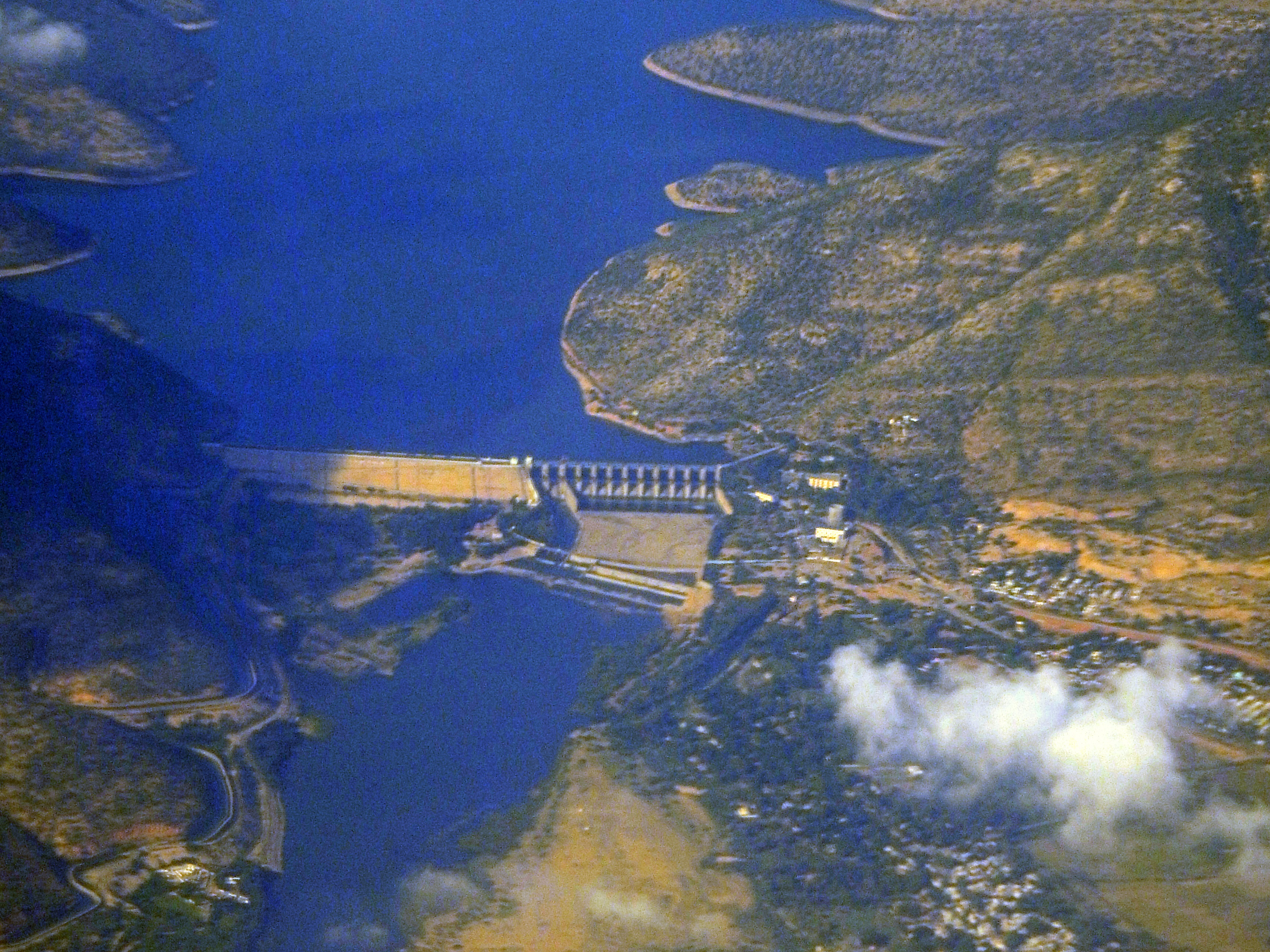
Aerial view of Somasila dam in Nellore district

== List of Major Irrigation dams and reservoirs in Andhra Pradesh ==
Existing & Proposed Major dams and reservoirs:

Name & Place	Gross Storage (TMC)	River Basin	Constructed Year
Nagarjuna Sagar Dam, Vijayapuri South	312	Krishna River	1967
Srisailam Dam, Srisailam	216	Krishna River	1981
Polavaram Project, Polavaram	194	Godavari River	Under Construction
Somasila Dam, Somasila village	75	Penna River	1989
Pulichinthala Project, Pulichinthala village	45.77	Krishna River	2009
Nallamalasagar Reservoir, Markapur	43.5	Krishna River	Under Construction
Jalaput Dam, Jalaput	34.27	Machkund River	2000
Gandikota Reservoir, Gandikota village	26.84	Penna River and Chitravathi River	2013
Kalyani Dam, Tirupati	25 Million Cubic Meters	Swarnamukhi River	1977
Brahmamsagar Reservoir, Bramhamgari Matham	17.73	Penna River	1984
Velugodu Balancing Reservoir, Velgode	16.95	Galeru River	2016
PABR Dam, Penna Ahobilam	11.10	Penna River	1983
Vykuntapuram Barrage, Amaravati	10	Krishna River	Under Construction
Chitravathi Balancing Reservoir, Parnapalli village	10	Chitravathi River	2003
Mylavaram Dam, Mylavaram	9.96	Penna River	1981-82
Dowleswaram Barrage, Rajahmundry	5.14	Godavari River	1850
Mid Pennar Dam, Marutla village	5	Penna River	1980
Veligallu Dam Reservoir, Galiveedu	4.64	Papagni River	2008
Rajolibanda Dam, Kurnool	4	Tungabhadra River	1956
Gundlakamma Reservoir Project, Chinnamallavaram	3.85	Gundlakamma River	1978
Tatipudi Reservoir, Tatipudi	3.32	Gosthani River	1968
Prakasham Barrage, Vijayawada	3	Krishna River	1855
Thotapalli Barrage, Thotapali village	2.51	Nagavali River	2015
Sanjeevaiah Sagar Dam, Gajuladinne village	2	Handri River	2013
Sunkesula Barrage, Kurnool	1.25	Tungabhadra River	1861
Jeedipalli Reservoir, Jeedipalli village	1.69	Handri River	2012
Gollapalli Reservoir, Penukonda	1.91	Handri River	2016

== List of Major Lift Irrigation Projects in Andhra Pradesh ==
Existing and Proposed Lift Irrigation Projects:

Lift Irrigation Project	Lift Irrigation Stage	No of Pumps	Discharge Capacity	River Basin	Lift Locations
Pattiseema Lift Irrigation Project	Pattiseema - Stage I	24	240 cumecs	Godavari River	Polavaram Project, Polavaram village
Pattiseema Lift Irrigation Project	Pattiseema - Stage II	24	240 cumecs	Krishna River	Prakasham Barrage, Vijayawada
Gandikota Lift Irrigation Project	Gandikota - Stage I			Penna River	Pulivendula Branch Canal, Kadapa
Gandikota Lift Irrigation Project	Gandikota - Stage II			Chitravathi River	Chitravati Balancing Reservoir, Parnapalli village

== See also ==
- Eastern Ghats
- Krishna River
- Godavari River
- Tungabhadra River
- Vamsadhara River
- Nagavali River
- Penna River
- Palar River
- Gosthani River
- Chitravathi River
- Gundlakamma River
- Swarnamukhi River
