= Mylavaram Dam =

Dam in India

Coordinates: 14°50′58″N 78°20′24″E

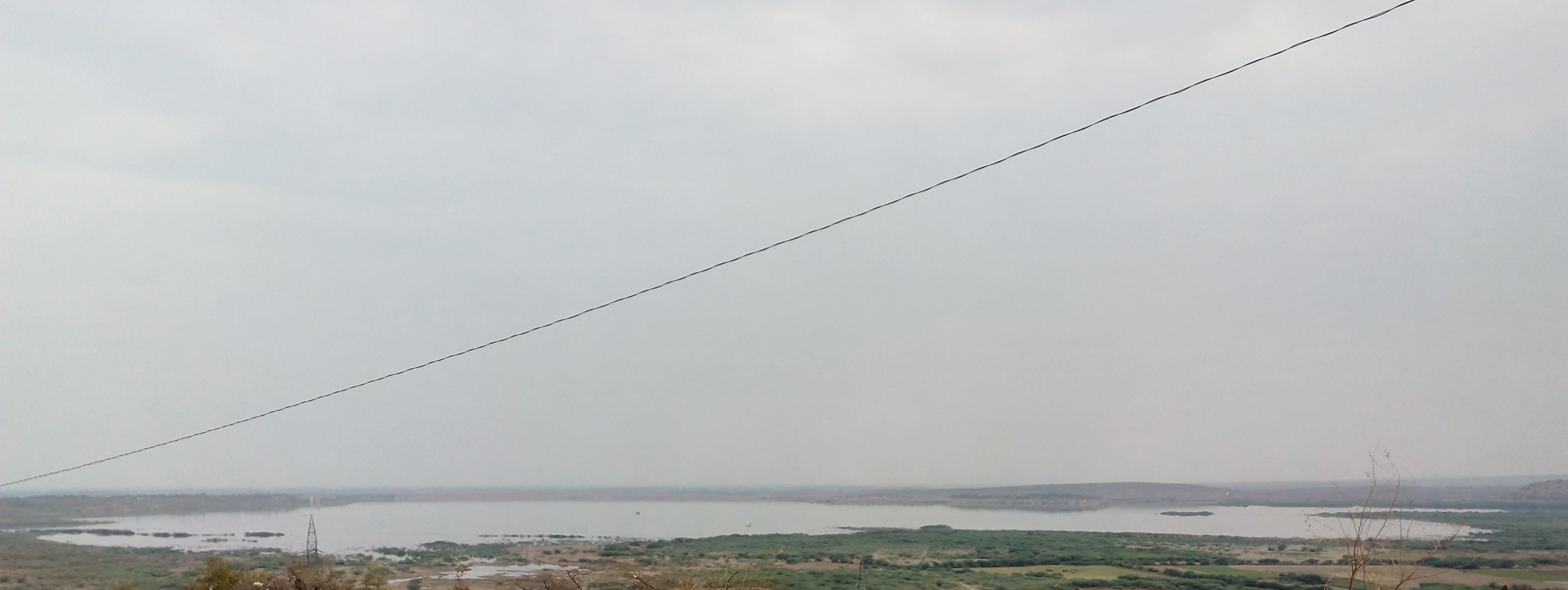
Long view of Mylavaram reservoir

Mylavaram Dam is a medium irrigation project in Andhra Pradesh, India. This barrage is situated over the Penna river in Kadapa district near Mylavaram. With the completion of srisailam right bank canal, Krishna River water would be fed from Srisailam reservoir to this reservoir. The reservoir has a total storage capacity of 9.96 tmcft.

== See also ==
- Somasila Dam
- PABR Dam
- MPR Dam
- Pothireddypadu Reservoir
- Jeedipalli Reservoir
- Veligallu Dam Reservoir
