= Indian rivers interlinking project =

Project to interlink rivers in India

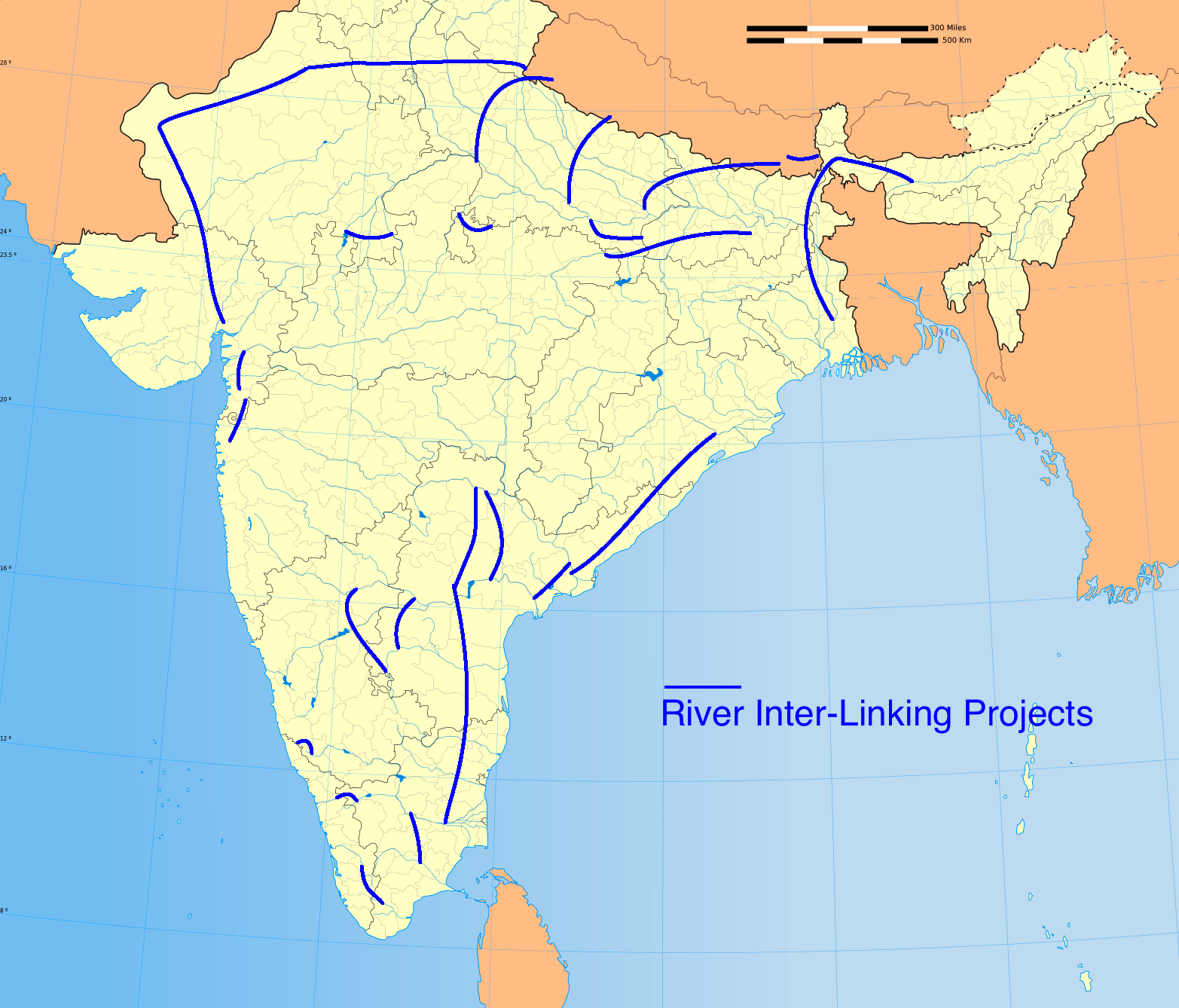
- Rivers Inter-Link, Himalayan and Peninsular Components
- Type of project: Interbasin transfer
- Country: India
- Status: In study

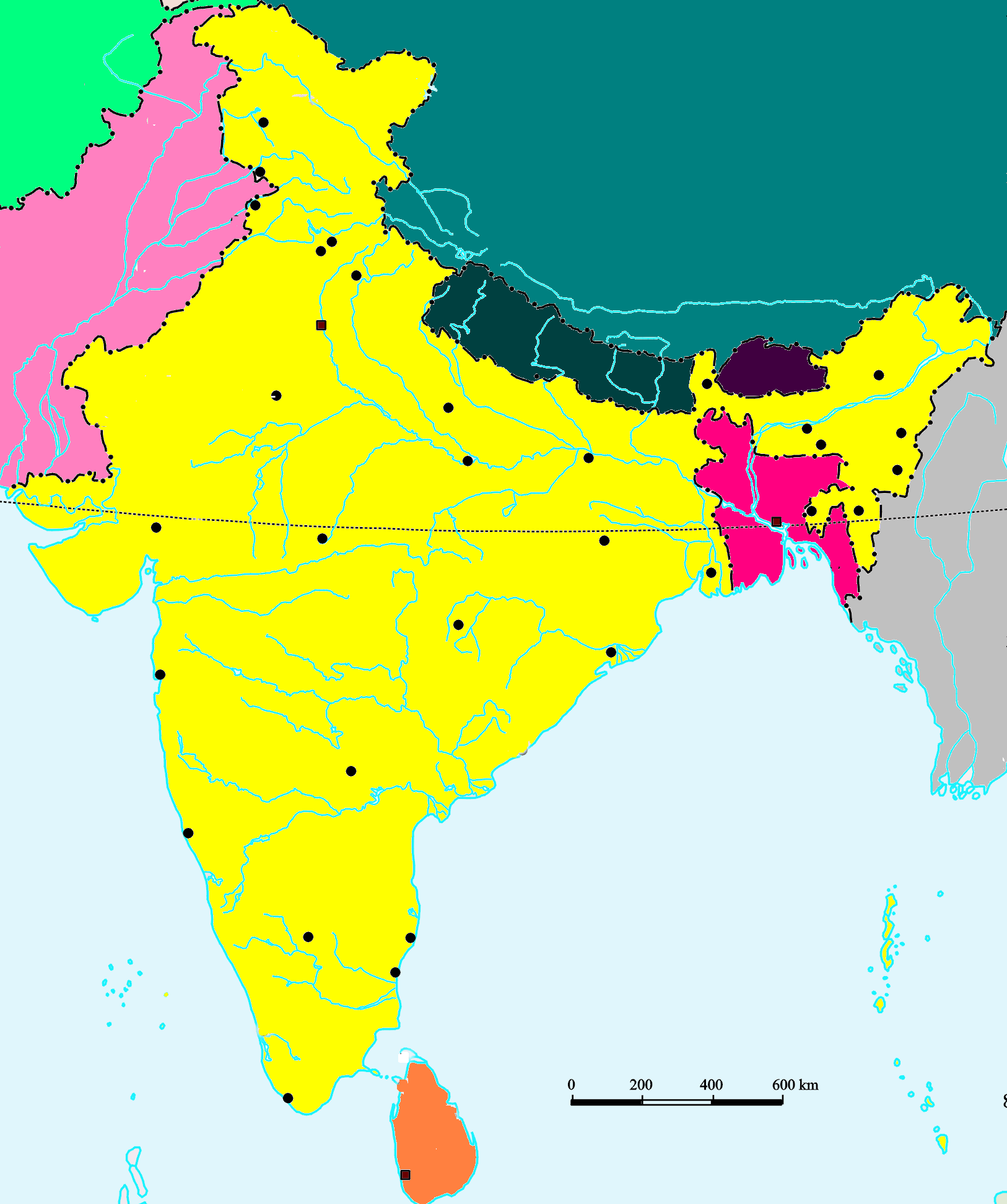
Map of India based on survey of rivers of India.

The Indian rivers interlinking project is a proposed large-scale civil engineering project that aims to effectively manage water resources in India by linking rivers using a network of reservoirs and canals to enhance irrigation and groundwater recharge and reduce persistent floods in some parts and water shortages in other parts of the country. India accounts for 18% of global population and about 4% of the world's water resources. One of the solutions to solve the country's water woes is to link its rivers and lakes.

The interlinking project has been split into three parts: a northern Himalayan rivers interlink component, a southern peninsular component, and starting in 2005, an intrastate river-linking component. The project is being managed by India's National Water Development Agency, which is part of the Ministry of Jal Shakti. NWDA has studied and prepared reports on 14 interlink projects for the Himalayan component, 16 for the peninsular component, and 37 intrastate river-linking projects.

Average rainfall in India is about 4,000 billion cubic metres, but most of the country's rainfall falls over a 4-month period—June through September. Furthermore, rain across the large nation is not uniform, with the east and north getting most rainfall and the west and south getting less. India also sees years of excess monsoons and floods, followed by below-average or late monsoons accompanied by droughts. This geographical and time variance in availability of natural water versus year-round demand for irrigation, drinking, and industrial water creates a demand–supply gap that has been worsening with India's rising population.

Proponents of the river interlinking projects claim the answer to India's water problem is to conserve the abundant monsoon water bounty, store it in reservoirs, and deliver this water—using the planned project—to areas and over times when water becomes scarce. Beyond water security, the project is also seen to offer potential benefits to transport infrastructure through navigation and hydro power as well as broadening income sources in rural areas through fish farming. Opponents are concerned about well-known environmental, ecological, and social displacement impacts as well as unknown risks associated with tinkering with nature. Others are concerned that some projects may have international impacts.

Map of the major rivers, lakes and reservoirs in India.

== The History ==
=== The British colonial era ===
A proposal regarding the interlinking of rivers in India has a long history. During the British colonial rule, for example, the 19th century engineer Arthur Cotton proposed the plan to interlink major Indian rivers in order to hasten import and export of goods from its colony in indian subcontinent, South Asia, as well as to address water shortages and droughts in southeastern India, now Andhra Pradesh and Odisha.

=== The Post independence ===
In the 1970s, Dr. K.L. Rao, a dams designer and former irrigation minister proposed "National Water Grid". He was concerned about the severe shortages of water in the South and repetitive flooding in the North every year. He suggested that the Brahmaputra and Ganga basins are water surplus areas, and central and south India as water deficit areas. He proposed that surplus water be diverted to areas of deficit. When Rao made the proposal, several inter-basin transfer projects had already been successfully implemented in India, and Rao suggested that the success be scaled up.

In 1980, India's then Ministry of Water Resources came out with a report entitled "National Perspectives for Water Resources Development". This report split the water development project in two parts – the Himalayan and Peninsular components. The Congress Party came to power and it abandoned the plan. In 1982, India financed and set up a committee of nominated experts, through National Water Development Agency (NWDA) to complete detailed studies, surveys and investigations in respect of reservoirs, canals and all aspects of feasibility of interlinking peninsular rivers and related water resource management. NWDA has produced many reports over 30 years, from 1982 through 2013. However, the projects were not pursued.

The river inter-linking idea was revived in 1999, after the National Democratic Alliance formed the Government of India, but this time with a major strategic shift. The proposal was modified to intra-basin development as opposed to inter-basin water transfer.

=== How it was in the 21st century ===
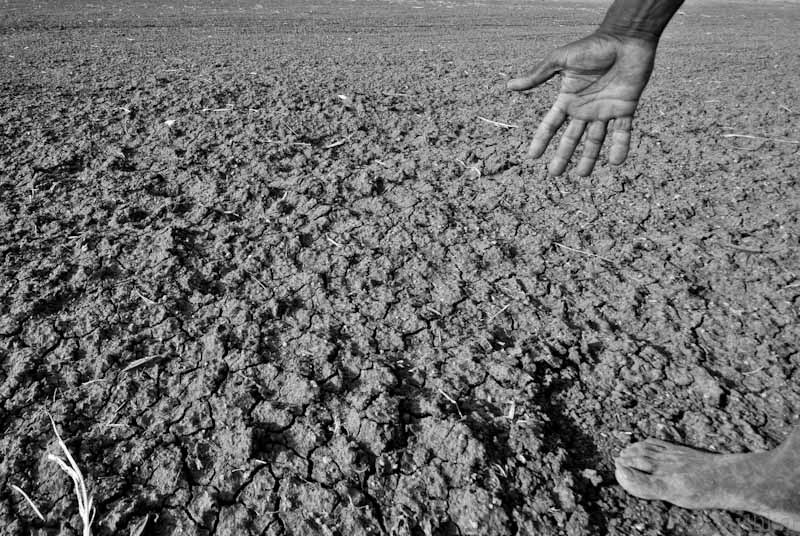
Drought affected area farm lands in Karnataka.

By 2004, the United Progressive Alliance (UPA) led by the Congress Party was in power, and it resurrected its opposition to the project concept and plans. Social activists campaigned that the project may be disastrous in terms of cost, potential environmental and ecological damage, water table and the dangers inherent with tinkering with nature. The central government of India, from 2005 through 2013, instituted a number of committees, rejected a number of reports, and financed a series of feasibility and impact studies, each with changing environmental law and standards.

In February 2012, while disposing a Public Interest Litigation (PIL) lodged in the year 2002, the Supreme Court (SC) refused to give any direction for implementation of the Rivers Interlinking Project. SC stated that it involves policy decisions which are part of legislative competence of state and central governments. However, SC directed the Ministry of Water Resources to constitute an experts committee, the 'Special Committee on ILR' (SC ILR), to pursue the matter with the governments as no party had pleaded against the implementation of the Rivers Interlinking Project.

== The need ==
Map showing rivers and flood prone areas in India

=== Drought, floods and shortage of drinking water ===
India receives about 4,000 cubic kilometers of rain annually, or about 1 million gallons of fresh water per person every year. However, the precipitation pattern in India varies dramatically across distance and over calendar months. Much of the precipitation in India, about 85%, is received during summer months through monsoons in the Himalayan catchments of the Ganges-Brahmaputra-Meghna (GBM) basin. The northeastern region of the country receives heavy precipitation, in comparison with the northwestern, western and southern parts. The uncertainty of the start date of the monsoons, sometimes marked by prolonged dry spells and fluctuations in seasonal and annual rainfall is a serious problem for the country. The nation sees cycles of drought years and flood years, with large parts of the west and south experiencing more deficits and large variations, resulting in immense hardship, particularly for the poorest farmers and rural populations. Lack of irrigation water regionally leads to crop failures and farmer suicides. Despite abundant rains during July–September, some regions in other seasons see shortages of drinking water. Some years, the problem temporarily becomes too much rainfall and weeks of havoc from floods. This excess-scarcity, regional disparity and flood-drought cycles have created the need for water resources management. Rivers inter-linking is one proposal to address that need. Due to global warming, fossil fuels use is discouraged and carbon neutral, clean, and renewable energy sources like solar and wind power are encouraged which are intermittent and variable types of electricity generation. Pumped storage hydroelectric power plants are needed to store the surplus electricity generated during daylight time by the solar power plants and supply the required electricity during the night hours. Water security, energy security, and food security can be achieved by interlinking rivers by envisaging multipurpose freshwater coastal reservoirs.

=== Population and food security ===
Population increase in India is the other driver of the need for river inter-linking. India's population growth rate has been falling but still continues to increase by about 10 to 15 million people every year. The resulting demand for food must be satisfied with higher yields and better crop security, both of which require adequate irrigation of about 140 million hectares of land. Currently, just a fraction of that land is irrigated, and most irrigation relies on monsoon. River interlinking is claimed to be a possible means of assured and better irrigation for more farmers, and thus better food security for a growing population. In a tropical country like India with high evapotranspiration, food security can be achieved with water security which in turn is achieved with energy security to pump water to uplands from water surplus lower elevation river points up to sea level.

=== Salt export needs ===
When sufficient salt export is not taking place from a river basin to the sea in an attempt to harness the river water fully, it leads to river basin closure, and the available water in the downstream area of the river basin closer to the sea becomes saline and/ or alkaline water. Land irrigated with saline or alkaline water gradually turns into saline or alkali soils. The water percolation in alkali soils is very poor leading to waterlogging problems. Proliferation of alkali soils would compel the farmers to cultivate rice or grasses only as the soil productivity is poor with other crops and tree plantations. Cotton is the preferred crop in saline soils compared to many other crops. Interlinking water surplus rivers with water deficit rivers is needed for the long-term sustainable productivity of the river basins and for mitigating the anthropogenic influences on the rivers by allowing adequate salt export to the sea in the form of environmental flows.

=== Navigation ===
India needs infrastructure for logistics and the movement of freight. Using connected rivers as navigation is a cleaner, low carbon footprint form of transport infrastructure, particularly for ores and food grains.

India's worsening water problem – satellite evidence of critical groundwater levels. The blue and purple regions have the greatest levels of groundwater depletion. Courtesy – Goddard Space Flight Center, NASA, United States (2010).

=== Current reserves and loss in groundwater level ===
India currently stores only 30 days of rainfall, while developed nations strategically store 900 days worth of water demand in arid areas river basins, and reservoirs. India's dam reservoirs store only 200 cubic meters per person. India also relies excessively on groundwater, which accounts for over 50 percent of the irrigated area with 20 million tube wells installed. About 15 percent of India's food is being produced using rapidly depleting groundwater. The end of the era of massive expansion in groundwater use is going to demand greater reliance on surface water supply systems. Proponents of the project suggest India's water situation is already critical, and it needs sustainable development and management of surface water and groundwater usage. Some proponents feel that India is not running out of water but water is running out of India.

== Discussion ==
=== Costs ===
The rivers inter-linking feasibility reports completed by 2013, suggest the following investment needs and potential economic impact:

Inter-link project	Length (km)	Estimated Cost in the year 2003 or earlier^{#}	New irrigation capacity added (hectares)	Potential Electricity generation capacity	Drinking & Industrial water added (MCM)	Reference	Status
Krishna–Pennar Link	587.2	₹6,599.80 crore (US$690 million)	258,334	42.5 MW	56		Under Construction
Godavari–Krishna Link	299.3	₹26,289 crore (US$2.7 billion)	287,305	70 MW	237		Completed
Parbati Kalisindh Chambal	243.7	₹6,114.5 crore (US$630 million)	225,992	17 MW	89		
Nagarjunasagar Somasila Link	393	₹6,320.54 crore (US$660 million)	168,017	90 MW	124		Under Construction
Ken Betwa Link	231.5	₹1,988.74 crore (US$210 million)	47,000	72 MW	2,225		Under Construction
Srisailam Pennar Link	203.6	₹1,580 crore (US$160 million)	187,372	17 MW	49		
Damanganga Pinjal Link	42.5	₹1,278 crore (US$130 million)	-	-	44		
Kaveri-Vaigai-Gundar Link	255.6	₹2,673 crore (US$280 million)	337,717	-	185		Under Construction
Polavaram-Vijayawada Link	174	₹1,483.91 crore (US$150 million)	314,718	72 MW	664		Under Construction
Mahanadi Godavari Link	827.7	₹17,540.54 crore (US$1.8 billion)	363,959	70 MW	802		
Par Tapi Narmada Link	395	₹6,016 crore (US$620 million)	169,000	93 MW	91		
Pamba Achankovil Vaippar Link	50.7	₹1,397.91 crore (US$150 million)	91,400	500 MW	150		Dropped

^{#}The cost conversion in US $ is at latest conversion price on the historical cost estimates in Indian rupees

=== Ecological and environmental issues ===
Some activists and scholars have, between 2002 and 2008, questioned the merits of Indian rivers inter-link projects, and questioned if appropriate study of benefits and risks to environment and ecology has been completed so far. Bandyopadhyay et al. claim there are knowledge gaps between the claimed benefits and potential threats from environment and ecological impact. They also question whether the inter-linking project will deliver the benefits of flood control. Vaidyanathan claimed, in 2003, that there are uncertainty and unknowns about operations, how much water will be shifted and when, whether this may cause water logging, salinity/alkalinity and the resulting desertification in the command areas of these projects. Other scholars have asked whether there are other technologies to address the cycle of droughts and flood havoc's, with less uncertainties about potential environmental and ecological impact. Rivers may change their courses every (approximately) 100 years, so the interlinking may not be useful after 100 years. Interlinking may also lead to deforestation and cause ecological imbalances, widely expected to alter fish communities. A study concluded that the project could reduce rainfall and change rainfall patterns in the region.

=== Displacement of people and fisheries profession ===
Water storage and distributed reservoirs are likely to displace people – a rehabilitation process that has attracted concern of sociologists and political groups. Further, the inter-link would create a path for aquatic ecosystems to be affected by movement of species from one river to another, which in turn may affect the livelihoods of people who rely on specific aquatic species for their income. Lakra et al., in their 2011 study, claim large dams, interbasin transfers and water withdrawal from rivers is likely to have negative as well as positive impacts on freshwater aquatic ecosystem. As regards to the impact on fish and aquatic biodiversity, there could be positive as well as negative impacts.

=== Poverty and population issues ===
India has a growing population, and large impoverished rural population that relies on monsoon-irrigated agriculture. Weather uncertainties, and potential climate change induced weather volatilities, raise concerns of social stability and impact of floods and droughts on rural poverty. The population of India is expected to grow further at a decelerating pace and stabilize around 1.5 billion by 2050, or another 300 million people – the size of United States – compared to the 2011 census. This will increase demand for reliable sources of food and improved agriculture yields – both of which, claims India's National Council of Applied Economic Research, require significantly improve irrigation network than the current state. The average rainfall in India is about 4,000 billion cubic meters, of which annual surface water flow in India is estimated at 1,869 billion cubic meters. Of this, for topological and other reasons, only about 690 billion cubic meter of the available surface water can be utilised for irrigation, industrial, drinking and ground water replenishment purposes. In other words, about 1,100 billion cubic meter of water is available, on average, every year for irrigation in India. This amount of water is adequate for irrigating 140 million hectares. As of 2007, about 60% of this potential was realized through irrigation network or natural flow of Indian rivers, lakes and adoption of pumps to pull ground water for irrigation.

80% of the water India receives through its annual rains and surface water flow, happens over a 4-month period – June through September. This spatial and time variance in availability of natural water versus year-round demand for irrigation, drinking and industrial water creates a demand-supply gap, that only worsens with India's rising population. Proponents claim the answers to India's water problem is to conserve the abundant monsoon water bounty, store it in reservoirs, and use this water in areas which have occasional inadequate rainfall, or are known to be drought-prone or in those times of the year when water supplies become scarce.

=== International issues ===
In a 2007 article the authors claim inter-linking of rivers to initially appear to be a costly proposition in ecological, geological, hydrological and economical terms, but in the long run the net benefits coming from it will far outweigh these costs or losses. However, they suggest that there is a lack of an international legal framework for the projects India is proposing. In at least some inter-link projects, neighbouring countries such as Bangladesh may be affected, and international concerns for the project must be negotiated.

=== Technological developments ===
Cost of power generation by solar power projects would be below Rs. 1.0 per Kwh in few years. Availability of cheaper, clean and perennial/renewable power would favour more water lifting/pumping and tunnels in the river link projects rather than purely gravity links to economize on cost, reduce construction time and reduce land submergence by optimum use of existing reservoirs/less storage, etc. Tunnelling technology/methodology has also undergone drastic improvements which makes it an alternative choice to open gravity canal links, with shorter distance and cost effective.

=== Political views ===
BJP-led NDA government of Atal Bihari Vajpayee had propagated the idea of interlinking of rivers to deal with the problem of drought and different parts of the country at the same time.

The Congress general secretary Rahul Gandhi said in 2009 that the entire idea of interlinking of rivers was dangerous and that he was opposed to interlinking of rivers as it would have "severe" environmental implications. Jairam Ramesh, a cabinet minister in former UPA government, said the idea of interlinking India's rivers was a "disaster", putting a question mark on the future of the ambitious project.

Karunanidhi, whose DMK has been a key ally of the Congress-led UPA at the centre, wrote that linking rivers at the national level perhaps is the only permanent solution to the water scarcity problem in the country. Karunanidhi said the government should make an assessment of the project's feasibility starting with the south-bound rivers. DMK for 2014 general elections added Nationalisation and inter-linking of rivers to its manifesto.

Kalpasar Project is an irrigation project which envisages storing Narmada River water in an offshore freshwater reservoir located in Gulf of Khambhat sea for further pumping to arid Saurashtra region for irrigation use.

== Plan ==
The National perspective plan envisions about 150-million-acre feet (MAF) (185 billion cubic meters) of water storage along with building inter-links. These storages and the interlinks will add nearly 170 million acre feet of water for beneficial uses in India, enabling irrigation over an additional area of 35 million hectares, generation of 40,000 MW capacity hydro power, flood control and other benefits.

The total surface water available to India is nearly 1440-million-acre feet (1776 billion cubic meters) of which only 220-million-acre feet was being used in the year 1979. The rest is neither utilized nor managed, and it causes disastrous floods year after year. Up to 1979, India had built over 600 storage dams with an aggregate capacity of 171 billion cubic meters. These small storages hardly enable a seventh of the water available in the country to be utilized beneficially to its fullest potential. From India-wide perspective, at least 946 billion cubic meters of water flow annually could be utilized in India, power generation capacity added and perennial inland navigation could be provided. Also some benefits of flood control would be achieved. The project claims that the development of the rivers of the sub-continent, each state of India, as well as its international neighbours stand to gain by way of additional irrigation, hydro power generation, navigation and flood control. The project may also contribute to food security to the anticipated population peak of India.

The Ganga-Brahmaputra-Meghna is a major international drainage basin which carries more than 1,000 million acre feet out of total 1440 million acre feet in India. Water is a scarce commodity and several basins such as Cauvery, Yamuna, Sutlej, Ravi and other smaller inter-State/intra-State rivers are short of water. 99 districts of the country are classified as drought prone, an area of about 40 million hectare is prone to recurring floods. The inter-link project is expected to help reduce the scale of this suffering and associated losses.

The National Perspective Plan comprised, starting 1980s, of two main components:

1. Himalayan Rivers Development, and
2. Peninsular Rivers Development

An intrastate component was added in 2005.

=== Himalayan component ===
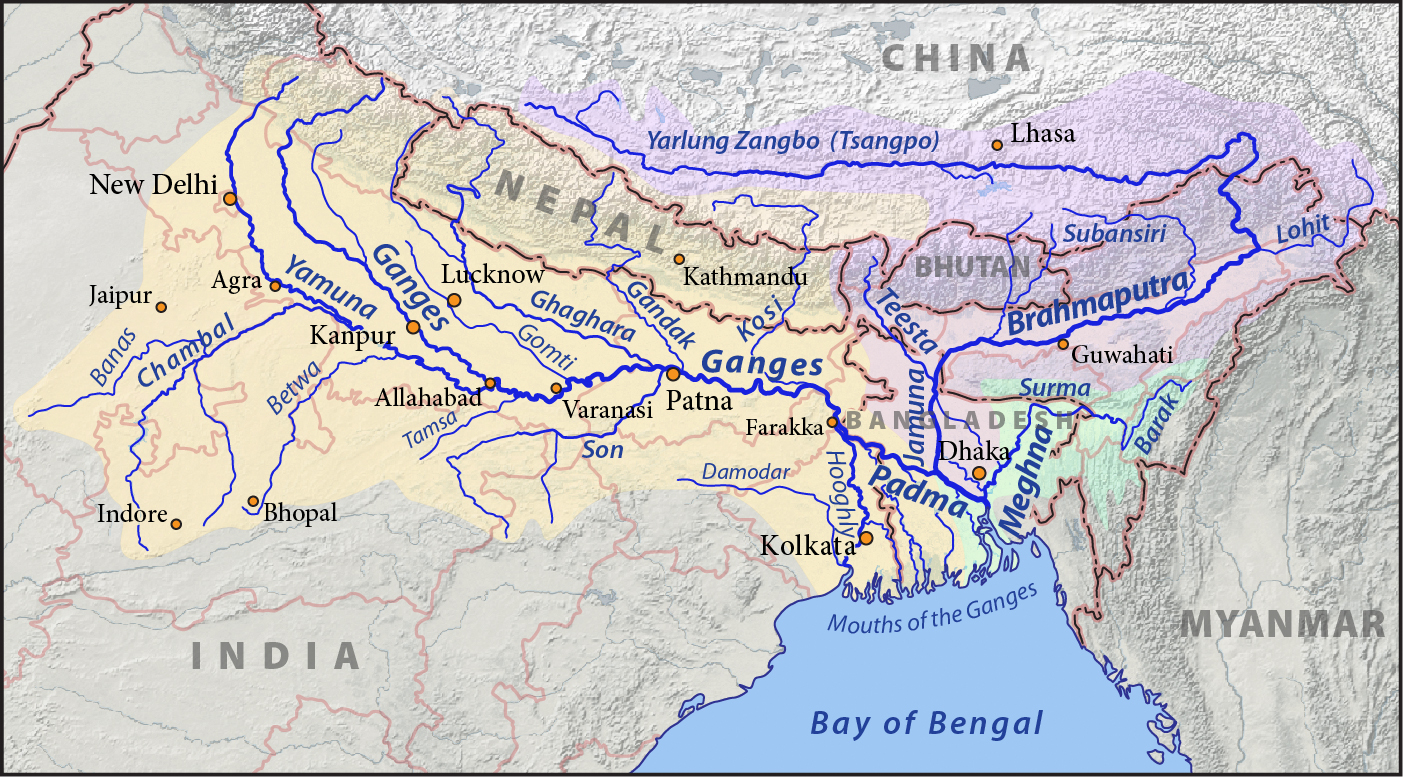
Map of the Ganges (orange), Brahmaputra (violet), and Meghna (green) drainage basins.

Himalayan Rivers Development envisages construction of storage reservoirs on the main Ganga and the Brahmaputra and their principal tributaries in India and Nepal along with inter-linking canal system to transfer surplus flows of the eastern tributaries of the Ganga to the West apart from linking of the main Brahmaputra with the Ganga. Apart from providing irrigation to an additional area of about 22 million hectares and generating about 30 million kilowatt of hydro-power, it will provide substantial flood control in the Ganga-Brahmaputra basin. The Scheme will benefit not only the States in the Ganga-Brahmaputra Basin, but also Nepal and Bangladesh, assuming river flow management treaties are successfully negotiated.

The Himalayan component would consist of a series of dams built along the Ganga and Brahmaputra rivers in India, Nepal and Bhutan for the purposes of storage. Canals would be built to transfer surplus water from the eastern tributaries of the Ganga to the west. This is expected to contribute to flood control measures in the Ganga and Brahmaputra river basins. It could also provide excess water for the Farakka Barrage to flush out the silt at the port of Kolkata.

By 2015, fourteen inter-links under consideration for Himalayan component are as follows, with feasibility study status identified:

- Ghaghara–Yamuna link (Feasibility study complete)
- Sarda–Yamuna link (Feasibility study complete)
- Yamuna–Rajasthan link
- Rajasthan–Sabarmati link
- Kosi–Ghaghara link
- Kosi–Mechi link
- Manas–Sankosh–Tista–Ganga link
- Jogighopa–Tista–Farakka link
- Ganga–Damodar–Subernarekha link
- Subernarekha–Mahanadi link
- Farakka–Sunderbans link
- Gandak–Ganga link
- Chunar–Sone Barrage link
- Sone dam–Southern tributaries of Ganga link

=== Peninsular Component ===
This Scheme is divided in four major parts.

1. Interlinking of Mahanadi-Godavari-Krishna-Palar-Pennar-Kaveri,
2. Interlinking of West Flowing Rivers, North of Mumbai and South of Tapi,
3. Inter-linking of Ken with Chambal and
4. Diversion of some water from West Flowing Rivers

This component will irrigate an additional 25 million hectares by surface waters, 10 million hectares by increased use of ground waters and generate hydro power, apart from benefits of improved flood control and regional navigation.

The main part of the project would send water from the eastern part of India to the south and west. The southern development project (Phase I) would consist of four main parts. First, the Mahanadi, Godavari. Krishna and Kaveri rivers would all be inter-linked by canals. Reservoirs and dams would be built along the course of these rivers. These would be used to transfer surplus water from the Mahanadi and Godavari rivers to the south of India. Under Phase II, some rivers that flow west to the north of Mumbai and the south of Tapi would be inter-linked. The water would supply additional drinking water needs of Mumbai and provide irrigation in the coastal areas of Maharashtra. In Phase 3, the Ken and Chambal rivers would be inter-linked to serve regional water needs of Madhya Pradesh and Uttar Pradesh. Over Phase 4, a number of west-flowing rivers in the Western Ghats, would be inter-linked for irrigation purposes to east flowing rivers such as Kaveri and Krishna.

The 800-km long Mahanadi-Godavari interlinking project would link River Sankosh originating from Bhutan to the Godavari in Andhra Pradesh through rivers like Teesta-Mahananda-Subarnarekha and Mahanadi.

The inter-links under consideration for Peninsular component are as follows, with respective status of feasibility studies:

- Almatti–Pennar Link (Feasibility study complete)(Part 1)
- Inchampalli–Nagarjunasagar Link (Halted construction by Telangana) (Part 1)
- Inchampalli–Pulichintala Link (Feasibility study complete) (Part 1) Merged with Inchampalli–Nagarjunasagar Link
- Mahanadi–Godavari Link (Feasibility study complete) (Part 1)
- Nagarjunasagar–Somasila Link (Part 1). It is remodelled as Srisailam to Somasila reservoir via Veligonda Project tunnels (fag end of construction) to reduce the cost of the link
- Par–Tapi–Narmada Link (Feasibility study complete) (Part 2)
- Parbati–Kalisindh–Chambal Link (Feasibility study complete) (Part 3)
- Polavaram–Vijayawada Link (link canal constructed and partly in use with Pattiseema lift) (Part 1)
- Somasila–Grand Anicut Link (Feasibility study complete) (Part 1)
- Srisailam–Pennar Link (link canals constructed and in use) (Part 1)
- Damanganga–Pinjal Link (Feasibility study complete) (Part 2)
- Kattalai–Vaigai–Gundar Link (Feasibility study complete) (Part 4)
- Ken–Betwa Link (Feasibility study complete) (Part 3)
- Netravati–Hemavati Link (Part 4)
- Bedti–Varada Link (Part 4)

=== Intra-state inter-linking of rivers ===
India approved and commissioned NWDA in June 2005 to identify and complete feasibility studies of intra-State projects that would inter-link rivers within that state. The Governments of Nagaland, Meghalaya, Kerala, Punjab, Delhi, Sikkim, Haryana, Union Territories of Puducherry, Andaman & Nicobar islands, Daman & Diu and Lakshadweep responded that they have no intrastate river connecting proposals. Govt. of Puducherry proposed Pennaiyar – Sankarabarani link (even though it is not an intrastate project). The States Government of Bihar proposed 6 inter-linking projects, Maharashtra 20 projects, Gujarat 1 project, Orissa 3 projects, Rajasthan 2 projects, Jharkhand 3 projects and Tamil Nadu proposed 1 inter-linking proposal between rivers inside their respective territories. Since 2005, NWDA completed feasibility studies on the projects, found 1 project infeasible, 20 projects as feasible, 1 project was withdrawn by Government of Maharashtra, and others are still under study.

== Progress ==
On 16 September 2015, first linking was completed of rivers Krishna and Godavari. It is still under review. But it isn't considered as a true river interlinking as it is just a small lift irrigation with few lines of pipes.

== Current status ==
NWDA had drafted Detailed Project Report (DPR) of Godavari-Cauvery link project consisting of three links; Godavari (Inchampalli/Janampet) – Krishna (Nagarjunasagar), Krishna (Nagarjunasagar) – Pennar (Somasila), Pennar (Somasila)-Cauvery (Grand Anicut) link projects which was circulated to involved States in March 2019. The concerns of involved states had been attended in September 2020.

== List of projects ==
Key

- PFR- Pre Feasibility Report
- FR- Feasibility Report
- DPR- Detailed Project Report

Names of Inter Basin Water Transfer Links, the States involved, name of rivers and status of Feasibility Reports/Detailed Project Report
S. No.		Name	Rivers	States concerned	Present status
Peninsular Component
1		Mahanadi (Manibhadra) -Godavari (Dowlaiswaram) link	Mahanadi & Godavari	Odisha, Maharashtra, Andhra Pradesh (AP), Madhya Pradesh (MP), Telangana, Jharkhand, Karnataka, Chhattisgarh	FR Completed
2		Godavari (Inchampalli) - Krishna (Pulichintala) link	Godavari & Krishna	Odisha, Maharashtra, AP, MP, Telangana, Karnataka, Chhattisgarh& Maharashtra	FR Completed
3		Godavari (Inchampalli) - Krishna (Nagarjunasagar) link	Godavari & Krishna	Odisha, Maharashtra, Madhya Pradesh, Andhra Pradesh, Karnataka &Chhattisgarh	FR & Draft DPR Completed
4		Godavari (Polavaram) - Krishna (Vijayawada) link	Godavari & Krishna	Andhra Pradesh	FR Completed
5		Krishna (Almatti) – Pennar link	Krishna & Pennar	Maharashtra, Andhra Pradesh, Karnataka &Telangana	FR Completed
6		Krishna (Srisailam) – Pennar link	Krishna & Pennar	Andhra Pradesh	FR Completed
7		Krishna (Nagarjunasagar) - Pennar (Somasila ) link	Krishna & Pennar	Andhra Pradesh	FR & Draft DPR Completed
8		Pennar (Somasila) - Cauvery (Grand Anicut) link	Pennar & Cauvery	Andhra Pradesh, Karnataka, Tamil Nadu, Kerala & Puducherry	FR & Draft DPR Completed
9		Cauvery (Kattalai) - Vaigai -Gundar link Project (as an extension of Godavari-Cauvery Interlinking project)	Cauvery, Vaigai & Gundar	Karnataka, Tamil Nadu, Kerala & Puducherry	DPR Completed. Foundation stone laid and construction started
10		Ken-Betwa link	Ken & Betwa	Uttar Pradesh & Madhya Pradesh	FR & DPR (Ph-I, II & Comprehensive) Completed
11	(i)	Parbati -Kalisindh- Chambal link	Parbati, Kalisindh & Chambal	Madhya Pradesh, Rajasthan & Uttar Pradesh (UP requested to be consulted during consensus building)	FR Completed
11	(ii)	Parbati-Kuno-Sindh link	Parbati, Kuno and Sindh	MP and Rajasthan	PFR completed (Note: Integration of Eastern Rajasthan Canal Project of Rajasthan and Parbati – Kalisindh – Chambal link.)
12		Par-Tapi-Narmada link	Par, Tapi & Narmada	Maharashtra & Gujarat	DPR Completed
13		Damanganga - Pinjal link	Damanganga & Pinjal	Maharashtra & Gujarat	DPR Completed
14		Bedti - Varda link	Bedti & Varada	Maharashtra, Andhra Pradesh & Karnataka	PFR Completed
15		Netravati – Hemavati link	Netravati & Hemavati	Karnataka, Tamil Nadu & Kerala	PFR Completed
16		Pamba - Achankovil - Vaippar link	Pamba, Achankovil & Vaippar	Kerala & Tamil Nadu,	Project Dropped.
Himalayan Component
1		Manas-Sankosh-Tista-Ganga (M-S-T-G) link	Manas, Sankosh, Teesta and Ganga	Assam, West Bengal, Bihar & Bhutan	FR completed
2		Kosi-Ghaghra link	Kosi & Ghaghara	Bihar, Uttar Pradesh & Nepal	PFR completed
3		Gandak-Ganga link	Gandak & Ganga	-do-	FR completed (Indian portion)
4		Ghaghra-Yamuna link	Ghaghra & Yamuna	-do-	FR completed (Indian portion)
5		Sarda-Yamuna link	Sarda & Yamuna	Bihar, Uttar Pradesh, Haryana, Rajasthan, Uttarakhand & Nepal	FR completed (Indian portion)
6		Yamuna-Rajasthan link	Yamuna & Sukri	Uttar Pradesh, Gujarat, Haryana & Rajasthan	Draft FR completed
7		Rajasthan-Sabarmati link	Sabarmati	-do-	FR completed
8		Chunar-Sone Barrage link	Ganga & Sone	Bihar & Uttar Pradesh	Draft FR completed
9		Sone Dam – Southern Tributaries of Ganga link	Sone & Badua	Bihar & Jharkhand	PFR completed
10		Ganga (Farakka)-Damodar-Subernarekha link	Ganga, Damodar & Subernarekha	West Bengal, Odisha & Jharkhand	Draft FR completed
11		Subernarekha-Mahanadi link	Subernarekha & Mahanadi	West Bengal & Odisha	FR completed
12		Kosi-Mechi link	Kosi & Mechi	Bihar, West Bengal & Nepal	PFR completed
13		Ganga (Farakka)-Sunderbans link	Ganga & Ichhamati	West Bengal	FR completed
14		Jogighopa-Tista-Farakka link (Alternative to M-S-T-G)	Manas, Teesta & Ganga	-do-	Dropped

== International comparisons ==
Comparative rivers inter-link
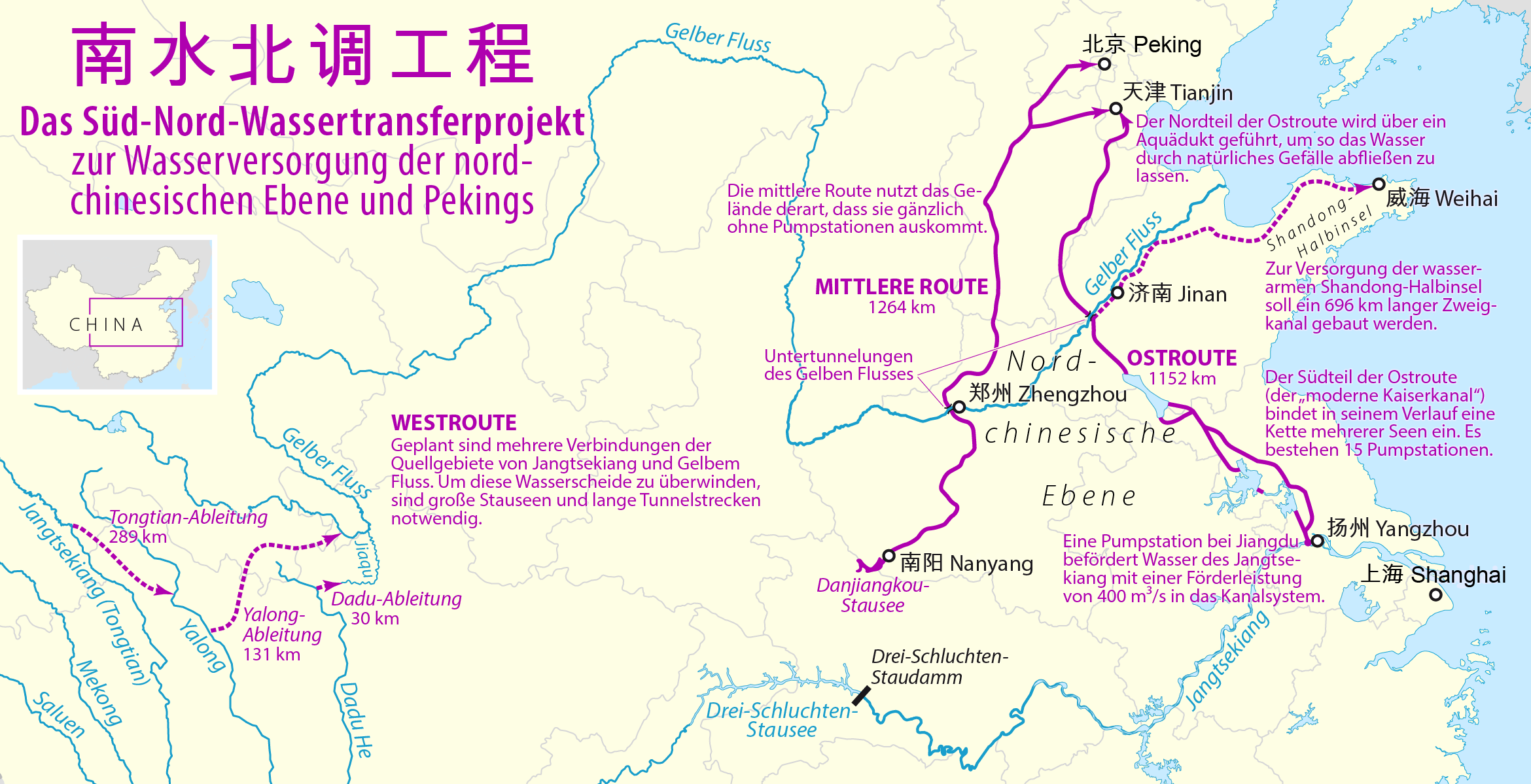
Map of South–North Water Transfer Project

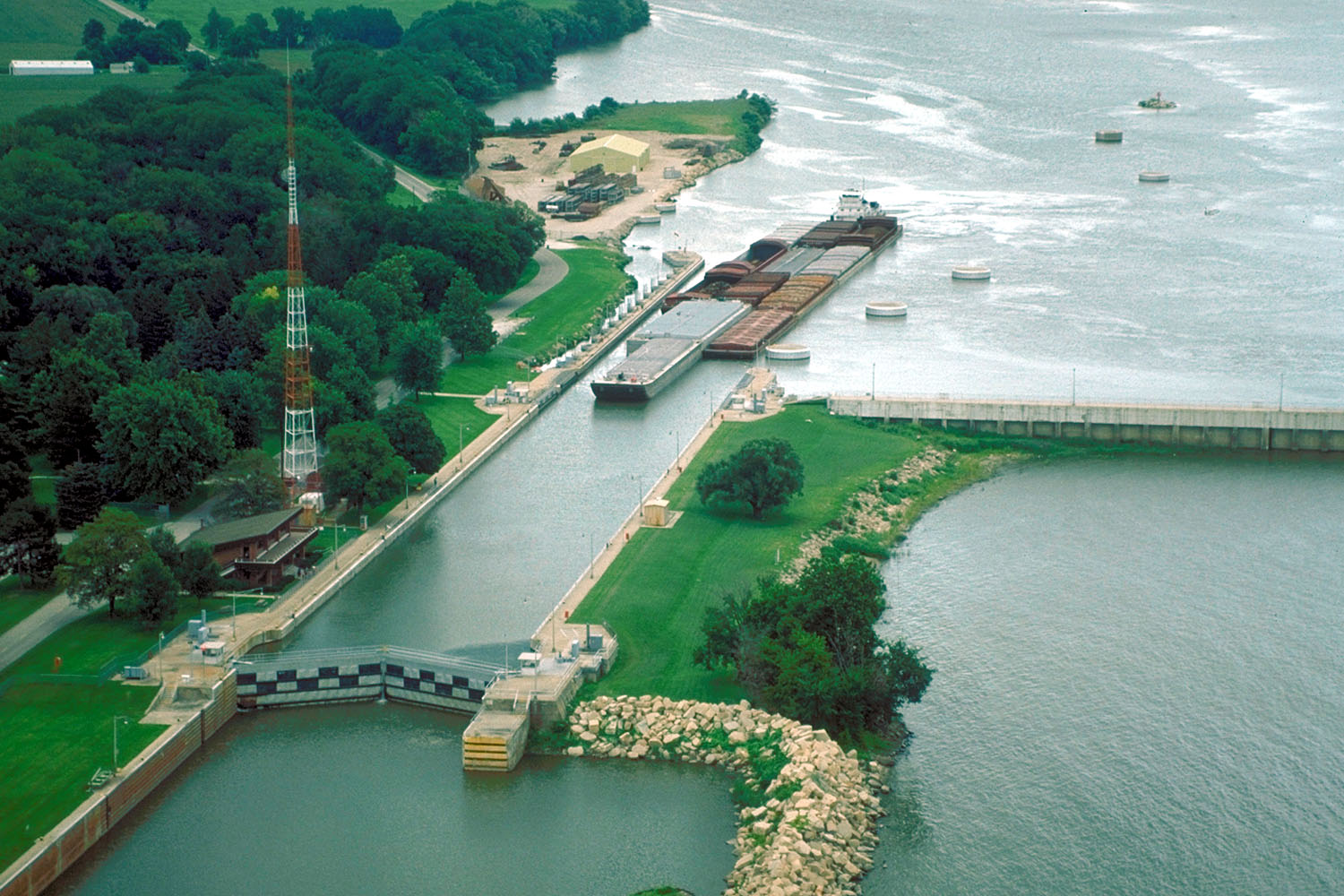
Illinois Waterway

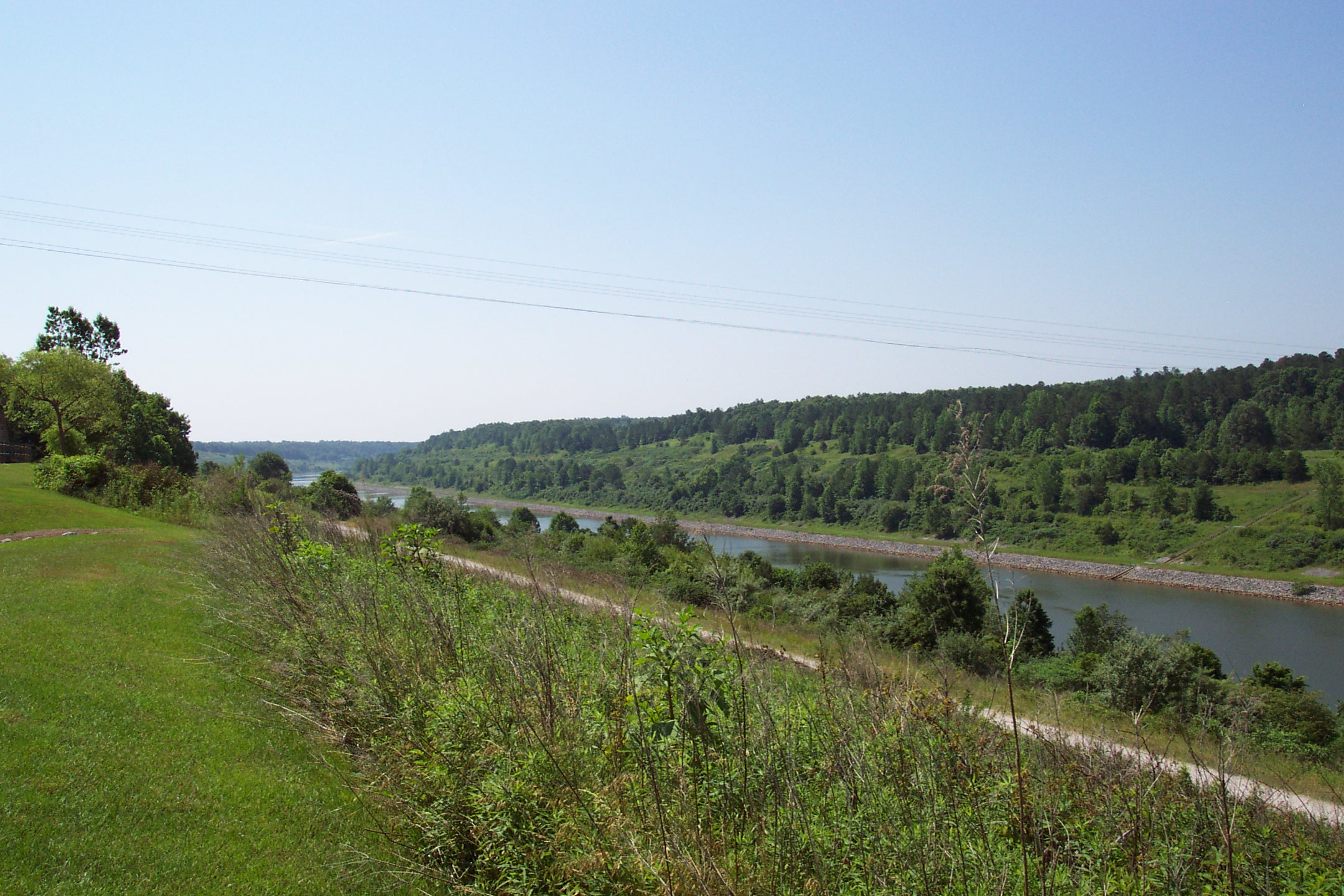
Tennessee–Tombigbee Waterway

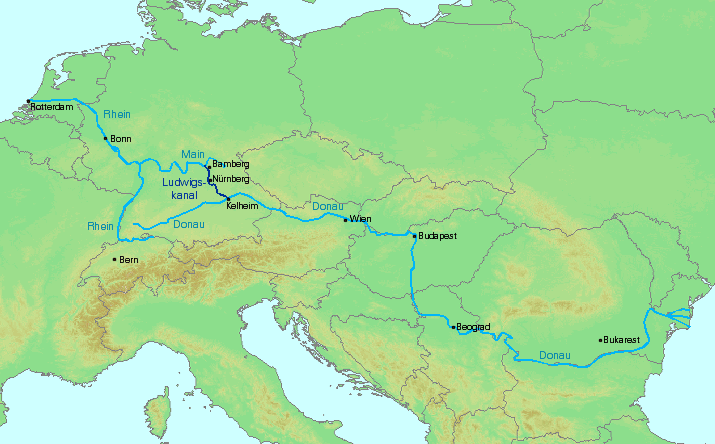
Rhine–Main–Danube Canal

The Indian Rivers Inter-link project is similar in scope and technical challenges as other major global river inter-link projects, such as:

1. Rhine–Main–Danube Canal – completed in 1992, and also called the Europa Canal, it inter-links the Main river to the Danube river, thus connecting North Sea and Atlantic Ocean to the Black Sea. It provides a navigable artery between the Rhine delta at Rotterdam in the Netherlands to the Danube Delta in eastern Romania. It is 171 km long, has the summit altitude (between the Hilpoltstein and Bachhausen locks) is 406 m above sea level, the highest point on Earth reachable by ships from the sea. In 2010, the inter-link provided navigation for 5.2 million tonnes of goods, mostly food, agriculture, ores and fertilizers, reducing the need for 250,000 truck trips per year. The canal is also a source for irrigation, industrial water and power generation plants.
2. Illinois Waterway system consists of 541 kilometres of interlink that connects a system of rivers, lakes, and canals to provide a shipping connection from the Great Lakes to the Gulf of Mexico via the Mississippi River. It provides a navigation route; primary cargoes are coal to powerplants, chemicals and petroleum upstream, and agriculture produce downstream primarily for export. The Illinois waterway is the principal source of industrial and municipal services water needs along its way; it serves the petroleum refining, pulp and paper processing, metal works, fermentation and distillation, and agricultural products industries.
3. Tennessee–Tombigbee Waterway is a 377 kilometre man-made waterway that interlinks the Tennessee River to the Black Warrior-Tombigbee River in the United States. The Tennessee–Tombigbee Waterway links major coal producing regions to coal consuming regions, and serves as commercial navigation for coal and timber products. Industries that utilize these natural resources have found the Waterway to be their most cost-efficient mode of transportation. The water from the Tenn-Tom Waterway is a major source of industrial water supply, public drinking water supply, and irrigation along its way.
4. Gulf Intracoastal Waterway, completed in 1949, interlinks 8 rivers, and is located along the Gulf Coast of the United States. It is a navigable inland waterway running approximately 1700 kilometres from Florida to Texas. It is the third busiest waterway in the United States, handling 70 million tonnes of cargo per year, and a major low cost, ecologically friendly and low carbon footprint way to import, export and transport raw materials and products for industrial, chemical and petrochemical industries in the United States. It has also become a significant source for fishing industry as well as for harvesting and shipping shellfish along the coast line of the United States.
5. The Central Yunnan Water Diversion Project is a water diversion project from the Jinsha River with 63 tunnels of total length 600 km to the Dianchi Lake in Yunnan province of China. Once this project is completed, it would be world's longest tunnel relegating Delaware Aqueduct tunnel of 137 km to second place.
6. Murray–Darling basin, this region in southern Australia with two rivers and associated watercourses was engineered for agriculture and a number of flows were altered over decades with the earliest alterations beginning in 1890. Among the results were changes in seasonal flows causing numerous ecological problems including cyanobacteria blooms killing off fishes, high salinity, acidification, and decline in numerous species of plants and animals. A study of attempts to repair the ecology that began in 2012 were reported as failing in 2017.

Other completed rivers inter-linking projects include the Marne-Rhine Canal in France, the All-American Canal and California State Water Project in the United States, South–North Water Transfer Project in China, etc.

== See also ==
- Great Plan for the Transformation of Nature
- Environment of India
  - List of rivers by dissolved load
  - Pollution of the Ganges
  - Water pollution in India
- Irrigation in India
  - Ground water in India
  - Interstate River Water Disputes Act
  - Kalpasar Project
  - Polavaram Project
- List of drainage basins by area
  - List of rivers of India by discharge
  - List of rivers by discharge
  - List of dams and reservoirs in India
- National Water Policy
  - Water supply and sanitation in India
  - Water scarcity in India
- Waterways in India
  - RORO ferries in India
  - Sagar Mala project
