= Jeedipalli Reservoir =

Reservoir in Andhra Pradesh, India

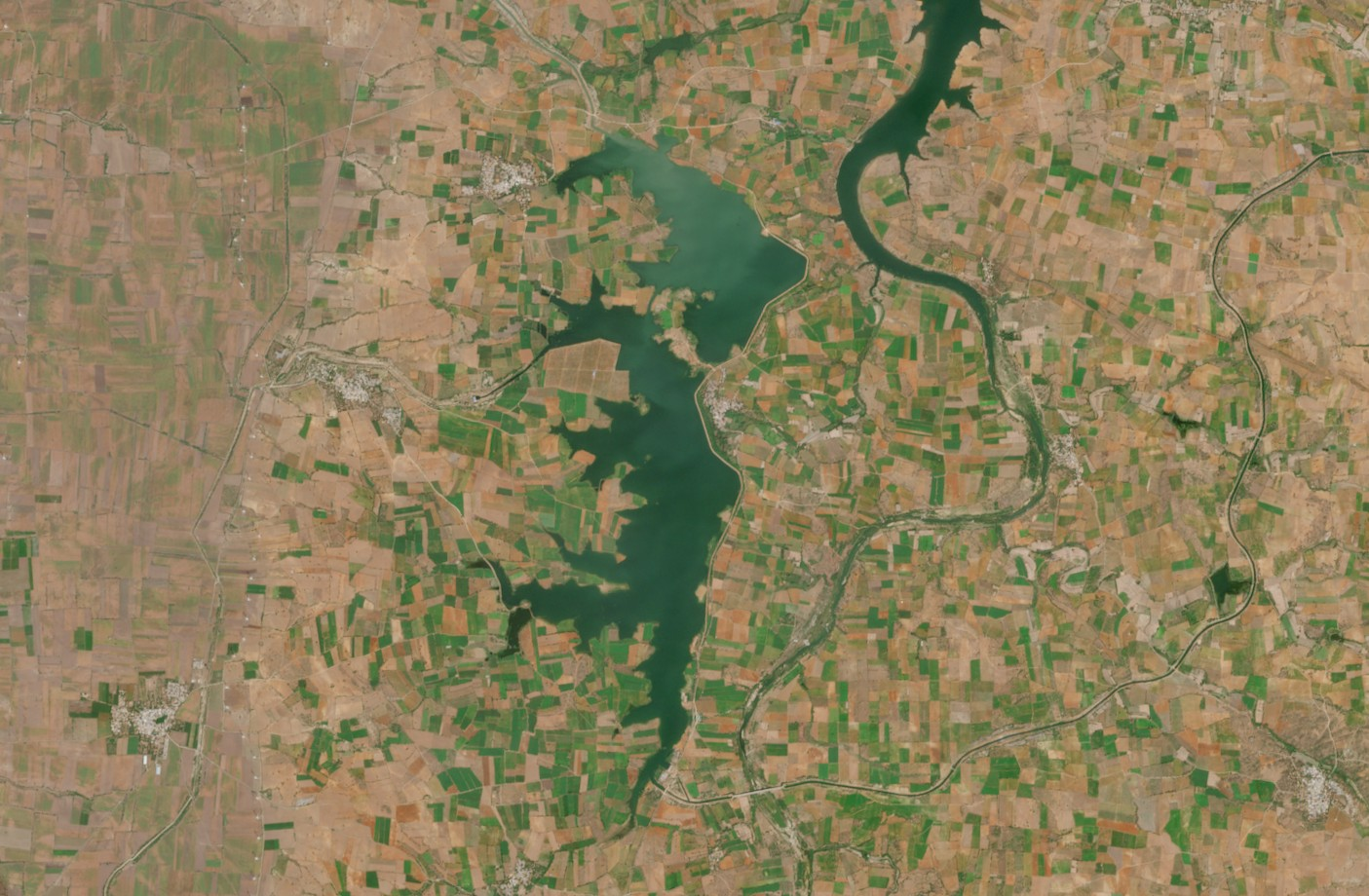
- Jeedipalli reservoir satellite image with Penna river to the right

- Location within India
- Location: Anantapur district, Andhra Pradesh, India
- Coordinates: 14°42′33″N 77°15′55″E

Jeedipalli Reservoir is an irrigation project located near Jeedipalli village in Beluguppa mandal Anantapur district in Andhra Pradesh, India. It receives water from Handri-Neeva canal which draws water from Srisailam reservoir. It is located in Jeedipalli village of Beluguppa mandal.

== Details ==
The project was started as a part of the Jalayagnam program. It was inaugurated on 29 November 2012 by Chief Minister of Andhra Pradesh, Kiran Kumar Reddy. It is located near Jeedipalli village of Beluguppa mandal. The reservoir with gross storage capacity of 1.7 tmcft is located in Penna River basin. This reservoir acts as balancing reservoir to supply Krishna River water in Penna, Krishna and Palar River basins in Ananthapur, Kadapa and Chittoor districts of Rayalaseema region in Andhra Pradesh. Water is further pumped from this reservoir to feed the Bhairivani Tippa reservoir located in Vedavati River basin which is a tributary of Krishna river.

== See also ==
- Tungabhadra Dam
- Mid Penna dam
- List of dams and reservoirs in Andhra Pradesh
