= Sanjeevaiah Sagar =

Gajuladinne Project
- Location within Andhra Pradesh
- Official name: Sanjeevaiah Sagar
- Country: India
- Location: Gajuladinne village, Kurnool district, Andhra Pradesh
- Coordinates: 15.6935°N 77.6191°E
- Purpose: Irrigation & Water supply
- Opening date: 2013
- Construction cost: 25 Lakh Cr
- Owner: Government of Andhra Pradesh

Dam and spillways
- Type of dam: Earth fill
- Impounds: Handri-Neeva
- Length: 1,910 m (6,266 ft)
- Spillway type: Ogee section
- Spillway capacity: 4.861 cumecs

Reservoir
- Creates: Sanjeevaiah Sagar Reservoir
- Total capacity: 2 Tmcft
- Catchment area: 1274 sq.km

The Gajuladinne Project (GDP) or Sanjeevaiah Sagar, is a dam on the Handri river situated about 20 km from Yemmiganur, Kurnool district, Andhra Pradesh, India.

== See also ==
- List of dams and reservoirs in India
- List of dams and reservoirs in Andhra Pradesh
