= Gollapalli Reservoir =

Reservoir in Andhra Pradesh, India

Coordinates: 14.206°N 77.580°E

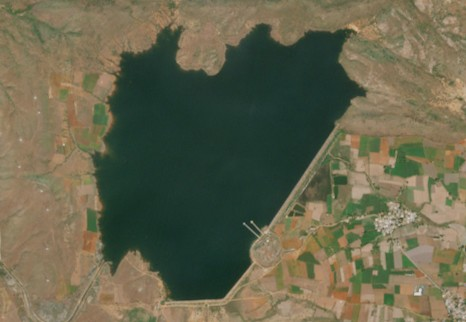
Gollapalli Reservoir Satellite view

Gollapalli Reservoir is an irrigation project located in Sri Sathya Sai district of Andhra Pradesh, India. It receives water from Handri-Neeva canal which draws water from Srisailam reservoir. It is located at Gollapalli village in Penukonda mandal Constituency.

== Details ==
The project was started as a part of Jalayagnam. It was inaugurated on 2 December 2016 by then Chief minister of Andhra Pradesh N. Chandrababu Naidu. The storage capacity of the reservoir is 1.91 tmcft. Water is further pumped from this reservoir to Madakasira and Hindupur through HNSS Main canal.
