= K. Sriramakrishnaiah =

Kuditipudi Sriramakrishnaiah (కుడితిపూడి శ్రీరామకృష్ణయ్య) (3 March 1926 in Betapudi, Guntur district – 20 March 2002) was an irrigation engineer who was actively associated in most of the irrigation projects of Andhra Pradesh for 34 years before retirement from the state government service in the year 1983.

== Services ==
In recognition of his capabilities, he was later appointed as "Officer on special duty " during the period 1984 to 1990, for executing the Telugu Ganga project. He also served as 'Adviser on irrigation projects' to government of Andhra Pradesh (1989), environmental appraisal committee member (1990 – 92) of Government of India, ‘Krishna, Godavari and Penna delta's drainage board' chairman (1995 – 97) and state planning commission member (1997 – till his death). During the 1990s, he devoted most of the time in advising his peers and educating the people on the irrigation and drinking water projects. During the 1970s, he actively participated in the activities of Krishna and Godavari river water disputes tribunals representing the state of Andhra Pradesh. He authored many essays in both Telugu and English and the following books in English

- The story of Penna basin
- Drought – Rayalaseema
- Exploitation of ground water in Rayalaseema
- Comprehensive master plan for drainage in coastal belt of Andhra Pradesh,
- Utilization of Godavari water by lift
- Irrigation in ancient India.

== Recognition ==
In recognition of his services, he was honored with 'National hydrology award' in 1987 by National Institute of Hydrology, Roorkee and 'Honorary Doctorate' in 1989 by Sri Venkateswara University. After his death, the Penna Ahobilam balancing reservoir was renamed in his honor as 'Dr. K. Sriramakrishnaiah Penna Ahobilam balancing reservoir'. Statues of him have been placed Anantapur city and on the banks of Brahmamgari Mattham reservoir in Kadapa district.

== Memorial Trust ==
The Dr. K. Sriramakrishnaiah Memorial Service Trust (డా.కె.శ్రీరామకృష్ణయ్య స్మారక సేవా సమితి – DKSSSS) was formed in the year 2002. The DKSSSS conducts educational and awareness enhancement programs every year and publishes many Telugu books on irrigation topics. His birthday (3 March) is celebrated every year as Irrigation Day in Andhra Pradesh.

== See also ==
- Krishna Water Disputes Tribunal
- Bharat Ratna. Vishveshwaraiah
- Dr. K.L. Rao
- Sir Arthur Cotton
- Engineer's Day
