= Pothireddypadu Reservoir =

Velgodu Balancing Reservoir
- Location within Andhra Pradesh
- Location: Velgode, Nandyal district
- Coordinates: 15°43′28″N 78°35′33″E
- Type: Reservoir
- Primary inflows: canal from Srisailam reservoir
- Primary outflows: Galeru river
- Catchment area: Penna River
- Basin countries: India

Velugodu Reservoir is a balancing reservoir and located across the Galeru river, a tributary of Kundu River in Penner River basin, at Velugodu town in Nandyal district of Andhra Pradesh. This reservoir is part of Telugu Ganga project and mainly fed by gravity canal from back waters of Srisailam Dam through Pothireddypadu head / flow regulator located across the feeder canal. Velugodu Reservoir has gross storage capacity of 16.95Tmcft at 265 m MSL full reservoir level.

This feeder canal called Srisailam right main canal (SRMC) also supplies water to Chennai city drinking water, Srisailam Right Bank Canal, K. C. Canal and Galeru Nagari Canal in addition to divert the Krishna river flood water to Penna river for storage in Somasila and Kandaleru reservoirs situated in Nellore district. The maximum flow capacity of the canal is 44,000 cusecs at full supply level of 267.92 metres (879 ft) MSL The sill/crest level of the SRMC at its starting point or Pothireddypadu head regulator is 848 feet (258 m) MSL.

As the canal water flow by gravity is not satisfactory when the Srisailam reservoir water level is below 264 metres (866 ft), a pump house to transfer 33,000 cusecs into the canal from the 830 feet (253 m) water level of the Srisailam reservoir is taken up on urgent basis.

== Telangana and Andhra Pradesh issues ==
Telangana govt claims that Pothireddypadu head regulator, which has approval for 1500 cusecs originally, was modified over the years illegally in united Andhra Pradesh to increase the capacity to 80,000cusecs. Telangana state claims that Srisailam project is not an irrigation project and was designed for electricity generation; there are allocations of only 15TMC for Chennai drinking water to be taken thru Pothireddypadu; but in year 2020, Andhra Pradesh(AP) govt diverted 179TMC of water from Krishna river to Rayalaseema region of AP which is in Penna basin. Also Telangana govt complains that AP govt is planning to increase lift the water from 800ft level(currently it can take water only if water level is 840ft or higher) with which AP can divert even more water in future. Grievances over irrigation water was one of the main reasons for Telangana movement which led to carving out Telangana state from Andhra Pradesh in 2014.
