= Handri-Neeva =

Handri Neeva Sujala Sravanthi project

Location
- Country: India

Physical characteristics
- Source: Srisailam reservoir
  - location: 15°54′31″N 78°14′08″E
  - elevation: 253 m (830 ft)
- Mouth: Malyala
- Length: 569 km (354 mi)
- Discharge
  - location: Adivipalli
  - average: 164.8 m^{3}/s (5,820 cu ft/s)

Handri-Neeva Sujala Sravanthi project is the longest water canal project in the region of Rayalaseema, Andhra Pradesh, India. The project was conceived to provide a reliable irrigation and drinking water supply for the region through drawing flood waters from the Srisailam reservoir.

The first phase of the canal begins at Malyala and irrigates six lakh acres in four districts of Rayalaseema, while the second phase provides irrigation facilities and drinking water for Chittoor district. This canal links the Handri, Penna, Chitravathi, Papagni, Mandavya, Bahuda, Cheyyeru, Gargeya, Vedavati, Palar and several smaller rivers in the Rayalaseema region. The canal is located in the Kurnool, Ananthapur, Kadapa, and Chittoor districts. The canal feeds several reservoirs and water tanks in the region. More than 50 Tmcft of water is required to meet the region's drinking and irrigation water requirements.

== History ==
The project was originally conceived by Englishman Sir Arthur Cotton in the late 19th century. However, designs were only finalised during the term of N. T. Rama Rao in the 1980s and 1990s. Budget allocation began in 2004 during the tenure of Y.S.Rajasekhara Reddy.

The first phase of construction of the project began in 2005, during the tenure of Shri Y. S. Rajasekhara Reddy The project is designed to utilise surplus water from the Krishna River; however, this river is unreliable and does not ensure consistent allocation of water to the drought-prone Rayalaseema and Nellore districts. Several political members had previously demanded speedy completion of irrigation projects in Rayalaseema. The two riparian states of the Krishna River, Andhra Pradesh and Telangana, are involved in a dispute over sharing water of the river.

== The Project ==
The lift canal has a length of nearly 550 km. The canal starts from the back waters of the Srisailam reservoir at Malyala and is routed along the hill ridges up to the highlands in Chittoor district via the many lifts and pumping stations in the Kurnool, Ananthapur and Kadapa districts, ending at the Adavipalli Reservoir. The canal feeds many tanks used for drinking water and irrigation. The project plans to draw nearly 40 Tmcft of water annually from the Krishna River.

The minimum draw down level for the Malyala pump house is 830 feet (253 m) MSL. The project's annual operational requirement is 653 MW and 1.9 billion KWh of electrical energy, which is used to pump nearly 30 Tmcft of water.

The first phase of the canal (220 kilometers in length), from Srisailam to Jeedipalli reservoir, has been completed. This reservoir is located at Chinna Mushtur village in Ananthapur district. 3 balancing reservoirs constructed in Phase 1. These include Krishnagiri (Kurnool District), Pathikonda Reservoir (Kurnool District), and Jeedipalli Reservoir (Anantapuramu District).

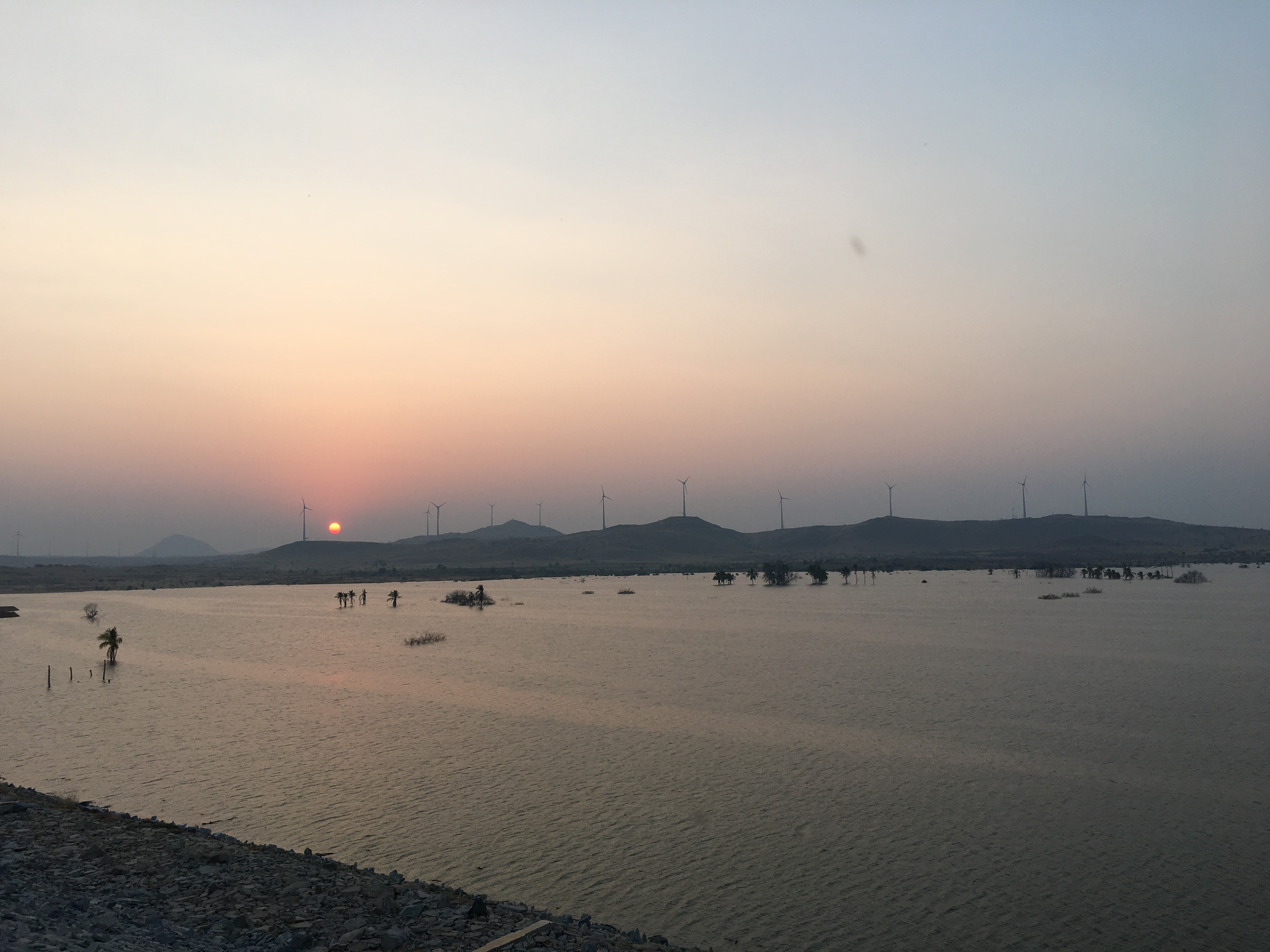
A view of Gollapalli Reservoir

The second phase (349 kilometers in length, 75% completed) of the main canal leading up to Adivipalli Reservoir in Chittoor district. Running at full capacity, it is predicted to give IP to 404,500 acres and drinking water facilities for 23 lakh people in 293 villages in the region. It will use 26 Tmcft of water to this effect, diverted through the 3 branch canals Madakasira, Punganur and Niva and the 3 distributaries Atmakuru, Thamballapalli, Vayalpadu. In the upland areas of Rayalaseema District (Anantapur, Kadapa and Chittoor), the canal will fill six reservoirs - Veligallu Dam Reservoir and 5 balancing reservoirs constructed in Phase-II, Gollapalli Reservoir (Anantapuramu), Cherlopalli Reservoir (Anantapuramu), Marala Reservoir (Anantapuramu), 4. Srinivasapuram Reservoir (Kadapa), and Adivipalli Reservoir (Chittoor).

The Handri-Neeva can also feed by gravity the Tungabhdra high level canal and many other medium & minor tanks in Penna River basin to provide drinking water during severe droughts. This canal also feeds water to Bhairivani Tippa reservoir and other medium & minor irrigation tanks located in Krishna river basin of Ananthapur district to ensure the sufficient water in the area even during droughts. Thus, the canal also serves as an alternate source to feed Krishna river water to major, medium & minor irrigation projects, which have access to nearly 45 Tmcft of Krishna water under Bachawat tribunal award allocations.

To make the lift canal operational for catering to drinking water needs even during a severe drought year, K.C. Canal water sourced from Sunkesula Barrage can be fed to the canal's pump house by gravity when water level in the Srisailam reservoir is below the minimum draw down level required by the water pumps.

A supplementary pump house at Muchumarri draws water from Srisailam reservoir at 800 feet (244 m) MSL exists. This pump house with its pipelines and canals can feed the nearby K.C. canal in addition to the Malyala pump house of Handri Neeva lift canal from dead storage water.

== Map ==
Google interactive Map for Rayalaseema Irrigation Projects.

== See also ==
- K. C. Canal
- PABR Dam
- Nagarjuna Sagar tail pond
- Krishna Water Disputes Tribunal
