= Poola Subbaiah Veligonda Project =

Irrigation project in Prakasam district, Andhra Pradesh

- Position
- Official name: Poola Subbaiah Veligonda Project
- Country: India
- Location: Dams at Kakarla, Gottipadia, Sunkesula, Markapuram district, Andhra Pradesh
- Coordinates: 15°38′59″N 79°6′37″E
- Purpose: Irrigation & Drinking water
- Status: Under construction
- Construction began: 1999
- Opening date: 31-08-2026
- Construction cost: 10,200Cr
- Owner: Andhra Pradesh Government

Dam and spillways
- Type of dam: Dam

Reservoir
- Creates: Nallamala Reservoir
- Total capacity: 53.85 TMC
- Website irrigationap.cgg.gov.in/wrd/static/approjects/poola.html

The Poola Subbaiah Veligonda Project, also referred to as Veligonda Project, is an irrigation project located in Markapur, Markapuram district in Andhra Pradesh, India. When completed, the project will provide irrigational facilities to 447,000 acres and drinking water to 1.5 million people in 30 Mandals of fluoride and drought affected areas in Markapuram district, Nellore district and Kadapa district by diverting 43.5 TMC of floodwater from the Krishna River from foreshore of Srisailam Reservoir near Kollamvagu and proposed to store in Nallamalasagar Reservoir. The water for the project is drawn through two 18.8 km long tunnels across Nallamala hills. The project has been renamed to the "Poola Subbaiah Veligonda Project". It displaces around 20,946 families. The oustees have protested for enhanced compensation over the years and many have not received the compensation promised to them.

== History ==
The areas that are now part of Prakasam, SPSR Nellore and YSR Kadapa districts have long faced water shortages. The region receives irregular and many areas depended mainly on rainfall for agriculture. The shortage of a reliable water source also affected drinking water supply. The need for a permanent source of water led to the idea of bringing Krishna River water to these drought-prone areas.

The proposal was to take water from the Srisailam reservoir and carry it through the Nallamala hills to the drought-prone areas on the other side of the hills. The water was intended to be used for irrigation as well as drinking water supply. The proposal later developed into the Veligonda Project.

The project began with feasibility studies carried out in 1991 by the Government of Andhra Pradesh. The first Detailed Project Report (DPR) was prepared in 1994. The foundation stone was laid on 5 March 1996 by Chief Minister N. Chandrababu Naidu. The project was renamed after Communist leader Poola Subbaiah, a former MLA from Markapuram who had campaigned for diversion of Krishna River waters to the drought-prone western region of Prakasam district.

In 2004, Chief Minister Y. S. Rajasekhara Reddy relaunched the project as part of the Jalayagnam irrigation programme. Administrative approval was granted on 9 July 2004, environmental and forest clearances were obtained during 2004–2005, and construction commenced in August 2005. The project was redesigned to include twin tunnels, the Nallamala Sagar reservoir, three dams at Sunkesula, Gottipadia and Kakarla, a feeder canal, and a network of distribution canals. By the time of Reddy's death in September 2009, approximately 50 per cent of the project works had been completed.

Construction of the twin tunnels, each approximately 18.8 km long, commenced in 2008–2009 using tunnel boring machines (TBMs). Between 2014 and 2019, the Telugu Desam Party government spent ₹1,414.51 crore on the project.

Following a change of government in 2019, the YSR Congress Party administration terminated the previous contractor's agreement and awarded the remaining tunnel works to Megha Engineering and Infrastructures Limited (MEIL) through reverse tendering, resulting in savings of ₹61.76 crore. An expenditure of ₹952.52 crore was incurred between 2019 and 2023. Tunnel-1 excavation was completed in January 2021, and Tunnel-2 excavation was completed on 23 January 2024. On 6 March 2024, Chief Minister Y. S. Jagan Mohan Reddy inaugurated the twin tunnels at Yeguvacherlopalli village in Dornala mandal.

Phase-I of the project was inaugurated on 31 August 2026 by Chief Minister N. Chandrababu Naidu at Gantavanipalli village in Dornala mandal, Markapuram district. Of the total estimated project cost of ₹10,200 crore, ₹7,983 crore had been spent on completing Phase-I, which includes the twin tunnels and feeder canals. Under this phase, 10.70 TMC of water is impounded in Nallamala Sagar, providing irrigation to 1.19 lakh acres and drinking water to approximately four lakh people.

== Design ==

Veligonda project components overlaid on map

The design includes two parallel tunnels of 18.8 km with 7 m (tunnel 1) and 9.2 m (tunnel 2) internal diameter and a 21.6 km flood flow canal for the water transmission system linking Srisailam reservoir to a reservoir called 'Nallamala Sagar'. Nallamala Sagar is planned to have 43.5 Tmcft live storage at 244 m msl full reservoir level and 214.3 m msl minimum draw down level. Full supply level to the tunnels from the Srisailam reservoir is 857 ft msl (261.2 m msl) and the sill level at tunnels water inlet is 840 ft msl (256.03 m msl).

Irrigation to 1.19 lakh acres and drinking water to 4 lakh population in Markapuram district is planned as part of the first stage. In the second stage, irrigation to 3.28 lakh acres and drinking water to 11.25 lakh population in 30 mandals of Markapuram, Nellore and Kadapa districts is planned. Velagalapalle lift irrigation scheme, Papinenipalli lift irrigation scheme are also part of the project. About 2.58 TMC water to the mega industrial hub at Donakonda in Prakasam district and another 1.27 TMC water National Investment and Manufacturing Zone (NIMZ) in Pamuru and Pedacherlopalle mandals of Markapuram district are also parts of the expanded scope of the project.

The tunnels pass beneath the Nagarjunsagar-Srisailam Tiger Reserve in the Nallamala hills, with an overburden ranging from 50 to 500 metres. The project uses a double shielded tunnel boring machine to minimise disturbance to wildlife.

As of January 2025, 18.2 km (11.3 mi) of the first tunnel and 11.02 km (6.85 mi) of the second tunnel had been completed.

== Expenditure ==
According to a September 2023 report in The Hindu, the expenditure on the project by period was as follows:

Period	Expenditure (₹ crore)
2004–2014	3,581.67
2014–2019	1,414.51
2019–2023	952.52
Total (by September 2023)	5,948.70

The original estimated cost in 2004 was ₹765 crore, which was revised to ₹8,054.14 crore, and subsequently to ₹10,200 crore.

== Land Acquisition and Rehabilitation ==
The Veligonda Project involves significant land acquisition and resettlement measures. As of 2023, Stage I land acquisition covered 23,468 acres out of a planned 24,931 acres, with 1,463 acres remaining. Stage II covered 6,832 acres out of 10,101 acres, with 3,269 acres remaining.

A total of 11 villages are expected to be submerged and relocated to 7 designated R&R centres at Idupuru (1, 2, and 3), Thokapalli, Goguladinne, Vemulakota, and Ondutla. Of 7,321 project-displaced families, compensation had been provided to 2,565 families as of 2023. Infrastructure development has been completed in 4 of the 7 R&R centres, while work continues in the remaining 3. The estimated cost for the R&R package and pending infrastructure works is ₹622.60 crore, and the estimated cost for land acquisition related to Canals Phase-I is ₹154.40 crore.

In 2024, the government announced a revised R&R package worth ₹1,200 crore for land acquisition and rehabilitation of displaced families. As of 2026, ₹768 crore in compensation had been disbursed to 6,206 evacuee families, with an additional ₹169 crore allocated to resolve pending grievances.

== Project Timeline ==
Detailed Project Report	1994
Groundbreaking	05-03-1996
Environmental clearance and Forest clearance	2004-2005
Final Administrative Approval	2005
Tender	08-01-2005
ReTender	2019
Tunnels Work	2014-2026
Tunnels and connecting canal works are planned to be completed by	31-07-2026
Water release	31-08-2026
