= Kanuri Lakshmana Rao =

Indian civil engineer

Minister of Irrigation and Power
- In office 19 July 1963 – 9 November 1973
- Prime Minister: Jawaharlal Nehru; Gulzarilal Nanda (interim); Lal Bahadur Shastri; Indira Gandhi
- Constituency: Vijayawada

Member of Parliament, Lok Sabha
- In office 1962–1977
- Preceded by: Dr. Komarraju Atchamamba
- Succeeded by: Godey Murahari
- Constituency: Vijayawada

Personal details
- Born: 15 July 1902 Kankipadu, Vijayawada, British India (now in Andhra Pradesh, India)
- Died: 18 May 1986 (aged 83) Hyderabad, Andhra Pradesh (now in Telangana)
- Party: Indian National Congress
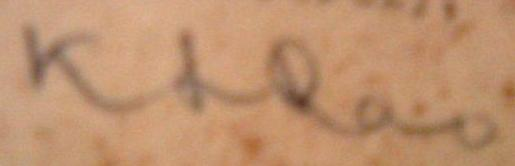
- Signature

Kanuru Lakshmana Rao (15 July 1902 – 18 May 1986) was an Indian Civil engineer and a Padma Bhushan awardee who served as the Union Minister of Irrigation & Power and Member of Parliament for Vijayawada from 1962 to 1977.

== Personal life and education ==
Rao was born in a Telugu Niyogi brahmin family in Kankipadu, Krishna district, Andhra Pradesh. His father was a village attorney. He lost his father when he was nine years old. His High school studies went well in SKPVV HINDU HIGH SCHOOL, VIJAYAWADA. He lost vision in one eye due to injury during childhood days while playing at school. He studied Intermediate (+2) at Presidency College, Madras. He took his B.E. degree in Civil Engineering from College of Engineering, Guindy and he was the first student from College of Engineering, Guindy to obtain a master's degree in engineering. Later he took his PhD in 1939 from the University of Birmingham in the United Kingdom.

== Honours ==
In 1963, Rao was awarded the Padma Bhushan for his contribution in the spheres of irrigation and power. He had been president of the Central Board of Irrigation and Power and of the All India Engineers Association in 1958–59 and 1959–1960. He was vice-president of International Society for Soil Mechanics and Geotechnical Engineering (Asia) in 1957–61 and in 1961–65. He was awarded a doctorate in science by Andhra University in 1960. He was also awarded a doctorate by Roorkee University in engineering in 1968.

== Engineering career ==
He worked as a professor in Rangoon, Burma. After completing his PhD he worked as assistant professor in the United Kingdom. He wrote a book called Structural Engineering and Reinforced Concrete. After returning to India, he worked as a design engineer for the Madras government. He held the post of director (designs) in Vidyut Commission-New Delhi in 1950. He was promoted as chief engineer in 1954.

He wrote autobiography titled The Cusecs Candidate.

== Political career ==
He was elected as a member of parliament from Vijayawada constituency for the first time in 1961. He was elected as member of parliament three times from the Vijayawada constituency. On 20 July 1963, Rao was sworn in as a minister for Irrigation and Electricity in the union government. Under his regime as union minister for water resources, Rao designed many irrigation and hydro-electric projects. Nagarjuna Sagar Dam, the world's longest masonry dam on River Krishna in Guntur district of Andhra Pradesh and Nalgonda District of Telangana, also the Srisailam Dam i.e constructed across the Krishna River on the border of Mahabubnagar(presently Jogulamba Gadwal) District, Telangana and Kurnool district, Andhra Pradesh near Srisailam temple town and is the 2nd largest capacity working hydroelectric station in the country is to his credit. Rao worked as union minister in Jawahar Lal Nehru, Lal Bahadur Shastri and Indira Gandhi's cabinet.

== Recognition ==
In 2006, the Pulichintala project, at Bellamkonda of Guntur district, has been named as K. L. Rao Sagar project.

== See also ==
- Arthur Cotton
- M. Visvesvaraiah
- K. Sriramakrishnaiah
