= PABR Dam =

Coordinates: 14°47′26″N 77°17′59″E

Penna Ahobilam Balancing Reservoir (PABR) is an irrigation project located across Penna River in Anantapur district of Andhra Pradesh state in India. Anantapur city gets its drinking water from the PABR. The reservoir with live storage capacity of 305 million cubic metres is mainly fed by Tungabhadra high level canal originating from the Tungabhadra Dam to the extent of 10 Tmcft water. A 20 MW hydro electric power station is also constructed at the dam site.

After the death of eminent irrigation engineer K. Sriramakrishnaiah in the year 2002, the Penna Ahobilam balancing reservoir is renamed in memory of him as "Dr. K. Sriramakrishnaiah Penna Ahobilam balancing reservoir" by the Andhra Pradesh government.

== See also ==
- Mid Penna dam
- List of dams and reservoirs in Andhra Pradesh
