= Kandaleru Dam =

Coordinates: 14°20′07″N 79°37′29″E

Kandeleru Dam is an irrigation project built on the Kandaleru River, a tributary of Penna, in Rapur mandal, Nellore district in the Indian state of Andhra Pradesh. The project is part of the Telugu Ganga project that supplies drinking water to Chennai city from the Srisailam reservoir on Krishna River. Kandaleru reservoir is mainly fed by a link canal from Somasila Dam. The Telugu Ganga project provides irrigation. It is nearly 57 Kilometers from the District Head Quarters.

== Design ==
It is an earth dam about 12 km long. Gross storage capacity is 72 billion cubic feet. The dam includes a head regulator, spillway and a sundial. The lead engineer was Shri Gudimella Raghupathi who designed and built the sundial in the dam.

== See also ==
- Nagarjuna Sagar tail pond
