= Galeru Nagari Sujala Sravanthi Project =

Coordinates: 14°48′28″N 78°14′59″E

Galeru Nagari
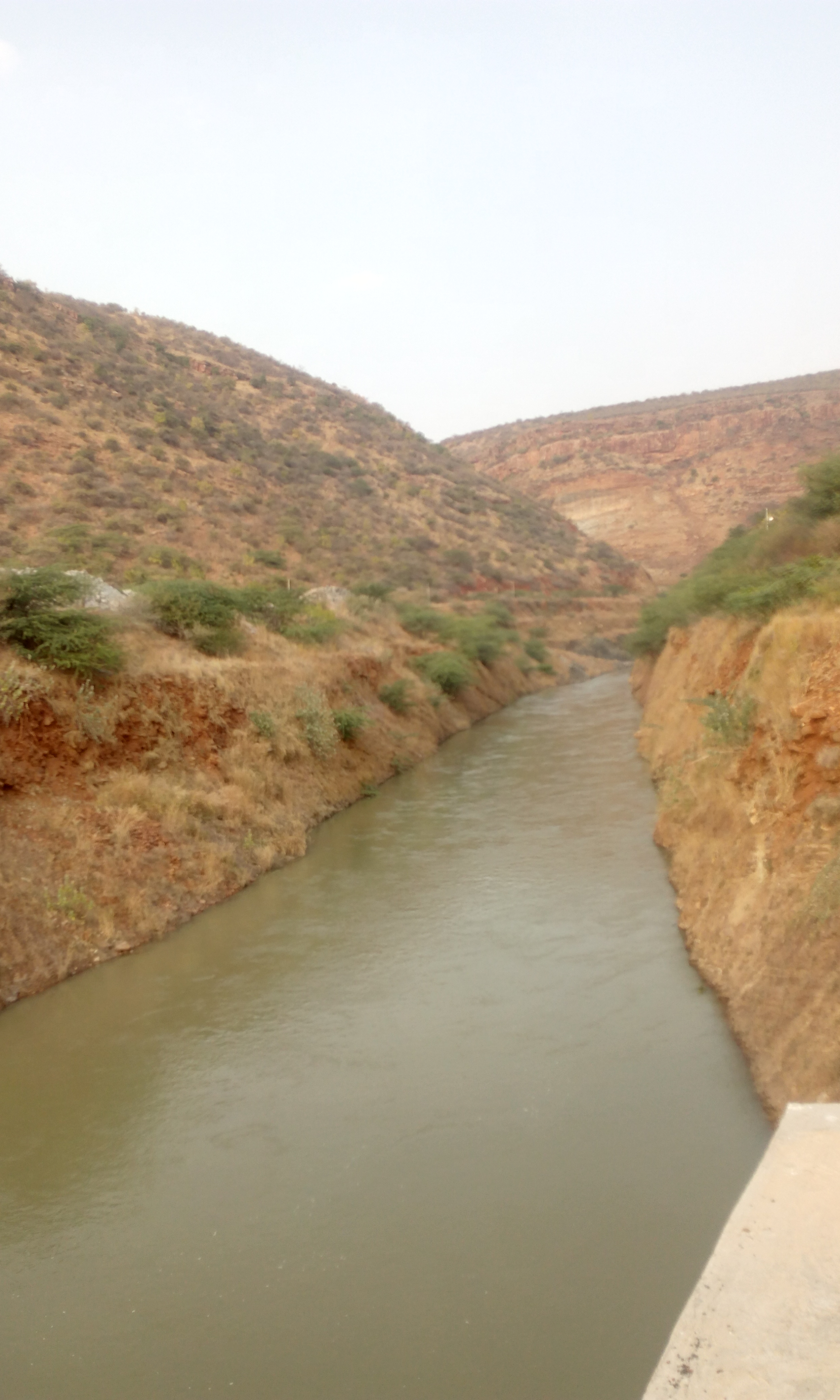
- Galeru Nagari Canal near Gandikota Reservoir
- Interactive map of Galeru Nagari
- Official name: Galeru Nagari Sujala Sravanthi project
- Country: South India
- Location: Srisailam dam right main canal - Bhanakacherla
- Purpose: Irrigation, Drinking water
- Construction began: 2005
- Opening date: Under Construction
- Owner: Government of Andhra Pradesh

Dam and spillways
- Length: 430 km (270 mi)

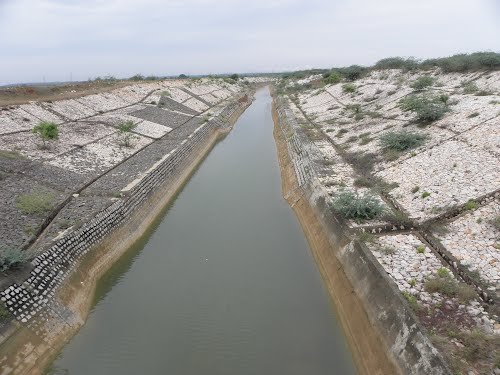
Canal in Nagari

Galeru Nagari Sujala Sravanthi Project or GNSS project is an irrigation project in Kadapa and Chitoor districts of Andhra Pradesh.

It is envisaged to irrigate 265,000 acres (1,070 km^{2}) in two phases as well as providing drinking water facilities to villages and towns en route the canal alignment. The main canal, Gandikota, Vamikonda and Sarvarajasagar reservoirs are under construction.

The scheme envisages drawl of 40 TMC surplus flood waters of river Krishna from the foreshore of Srisailam Reservoir through Srisailam Right Bank Canal (SRBC) system up to Gorakallu Reservoir and thereafter through an independent flood flow canal to feed nine storage reservoirs en route and utilize the stored water for irrigation during the Rabi season.

The project construction started in 2005, but the work is still in progress. This project doesn't have any assured water allocation and the Rayalaseema region people are strongly demanding the government to allocate assured water to the project.
