= Somasila Dam =

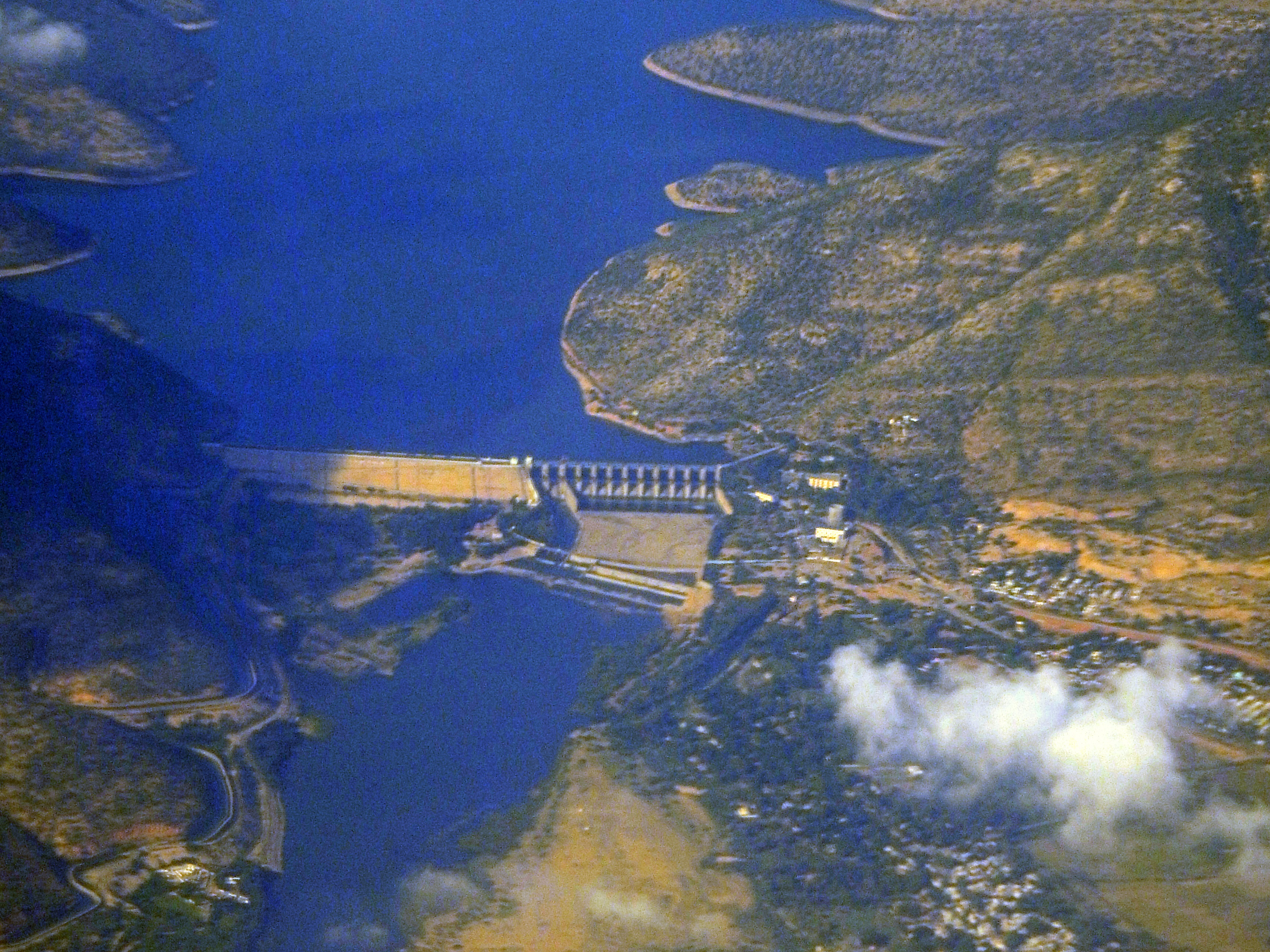
- Aerial view of the dam in September 2018

- Location within Andhra Pradesh
- Official name: Somasila Dam
- Location: Somasila, Nellore district, Andhra Pradesh, India
- Coordinates: 14°29′22″N 79°18′19″E
- Construction began: 1985
- Opening date: 1989
- Owner: Government of Andhra Pradesh
- Operator: Andhra Pradesh

Dam and spillways
- Type of dam: Earth-fill & Gravity
- Impounds: Penna River
- Height: 39 m (128 ft)
- Length: 760 m (2,493 ft)
- Spillway type: Ogee type

Reservoir
- Creates: Somasila Reservoir
- Total capacity: 75 Tmcft @ F.R.L. +100.58M
- Catchment area: 2.20862 km^{3} (1,790,557 acre⋅ft)
- Surface area: 212.28 km^{2} (52,456 acres)

Power Station
- Operator: APGENCO

The "Somasila Dam" is a dam constructed across the Penna River near Somasila, Ananthasagaram mandal, Nellore district, Andhra Pradesh, India. The reservoir impounded by the dam has a surface area of 212.28 km^{2} (52,456 acres) with live storage capacity of 1.994 km^{3} (1,616,562 acre⋅ft) or 75 tmcft.

The reservoir can get water by gravity from the Srisailam reservoir located in Krishna basin. It is the largest storage reservoir in Penna River basin and can store all the inflows from its catchment area in an average year. This reservoir can also feed by gravity nearby 72 tmcft gross storage capacity Kandaleru reservoir. Under Indian Rivers Inter-link projects, it is planned to connect the reservoir with the Nagarjunasagar reservoir to augment its water inflows.

One of the main canals is the Kavali Canal. Kavali canal is feeding to the 52 tanks under system of tanks. It will be covered dagadarthi mandal, sangham mandal, jaladanki mandal and kavali mandal. The total length of the canal is 67.619 km. Kavali Canal is the main source of drinking to Kavali municipality of nearly 1.2 lakh population.

It is nearly 79 kilometers distance from the District Headquarters.

== See also ==
- List of dams and reservoirs in Andhra Pradesh
- List of dams and reservoirs in India
- List of largest reservoirs in India
