= Veligallu Dam Reservoir =

Veligallu Dam
- Location within Andhra Pradesh Location within India
- Official name: Veligallu Dam
- Location: Galiveedu
- Coordinates: 14°01′53″N 78°28′37″E

Dam and spillways
- Impounds: Papagni River

The Veligallu Dam Reservoir Project is an irrigation project across Papagni River near Galiveedu in Kadapa district of Andhra Pradesh, India. The project's goal is to allow for the irrigation of a total of 24,000 acres (Galiveedu, Lakkireddypalli and Ramapuram Mandals of Rayachoti Taluk) in Rayachoti Taluk of Kadapa district and for drinking water provision for a population of 1 Lakh. The project's anticipated gross storage capacity is 4.64 Tmcft. Although officially declared complete in 2007, as of 2018 construction defects meant that the project was not fully in operation.
