= Jalayagnam =

Water management program in India

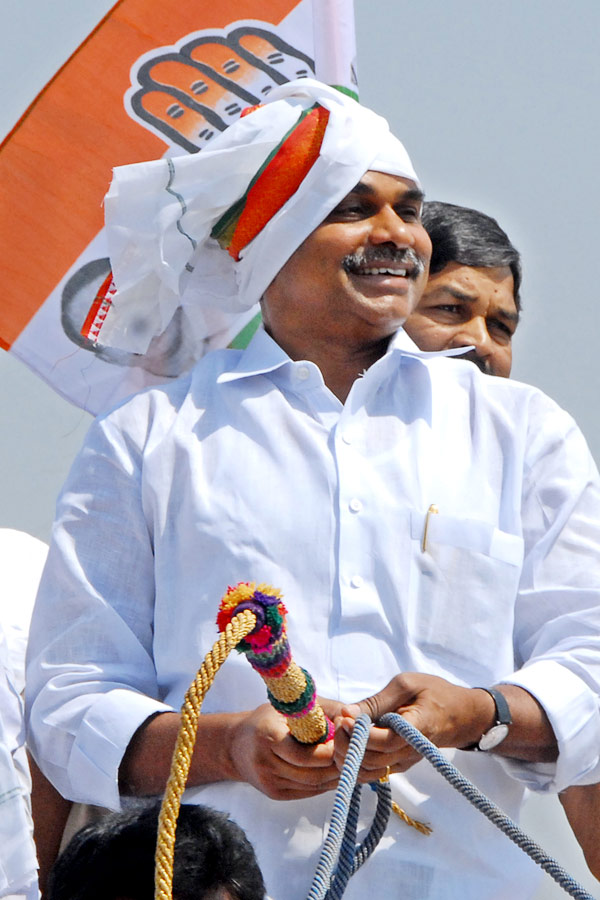
Y. S. Rajasekhara Reddy

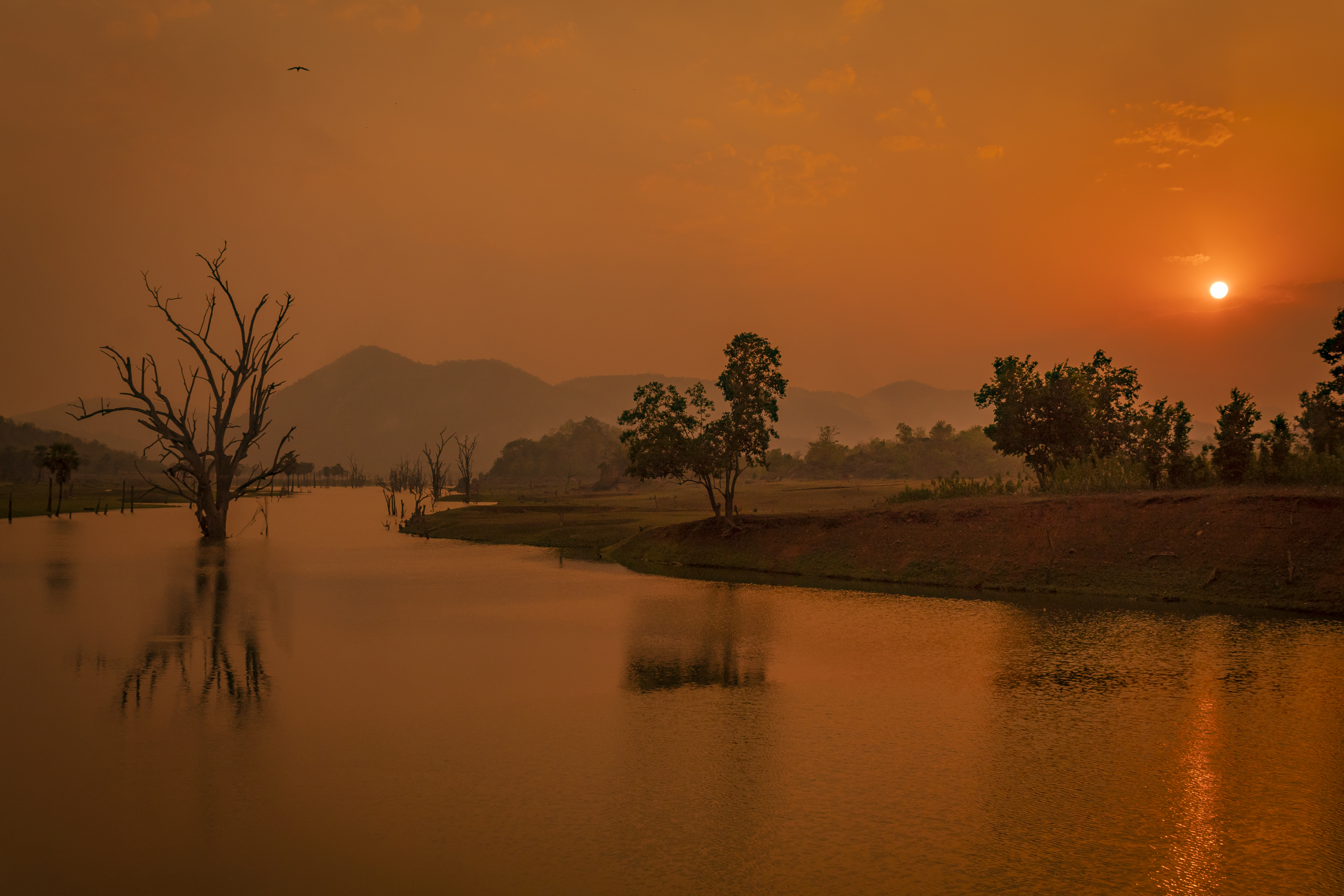
Bhupatipalem reservoir

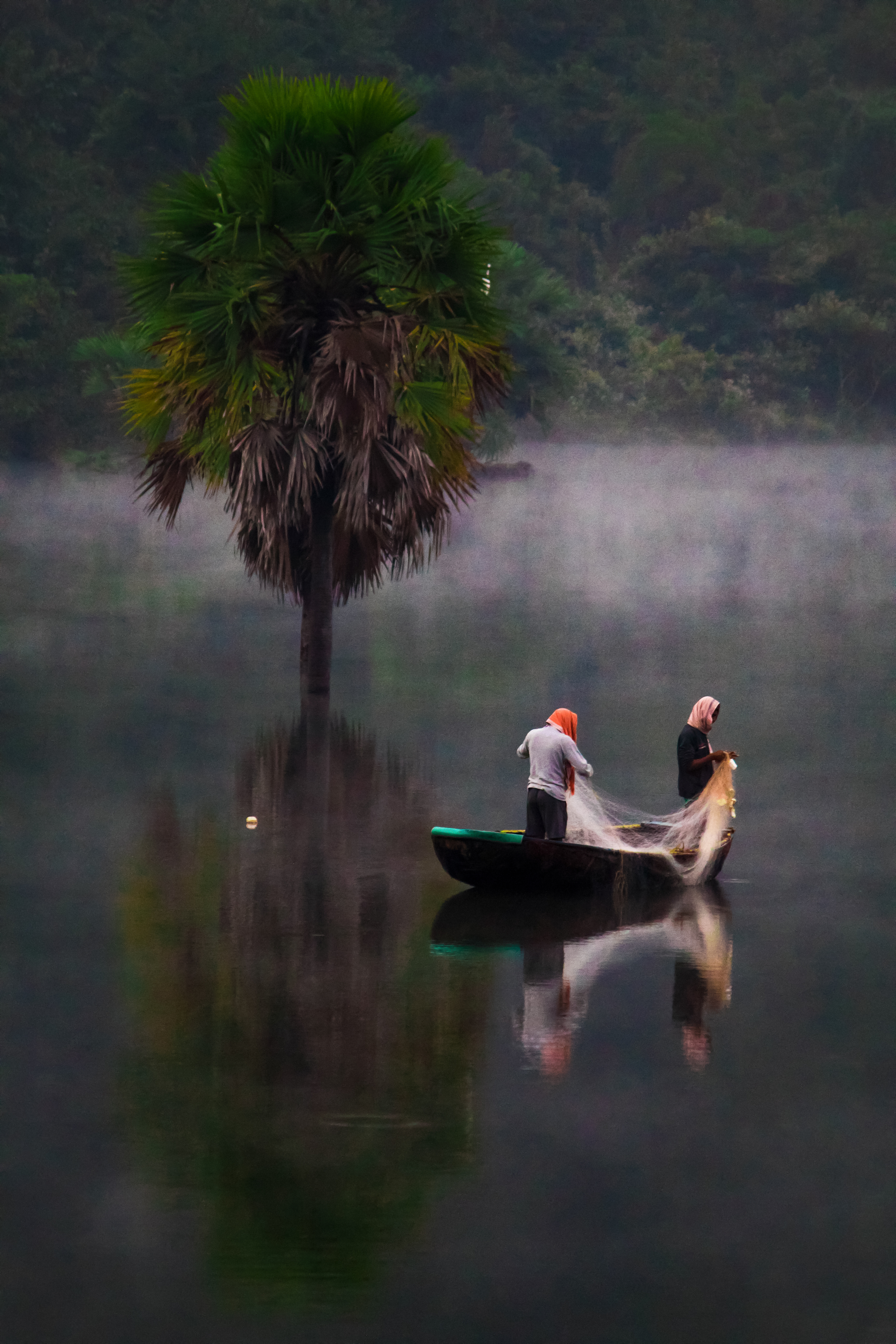
Fishing in Bhupathipalem reservoir

Jalayagnam or Jala Yagnam, (water worship), is a water management program in India. It was initially implemented by Chief Minister of Andhra Pradesh, India, Dr. Y. S. Rajasekhara Reddy as an election promise to the farmers of the state to provide irrigation to 8.2 million acres (8.2 million acres) in five years. Reddy was approved by the Indian central government and NGTL to proceed with the project before he died. The project includes site clearance, environmental clearance, R&R clearance, wildlife sanctuary clearance, forest clearance and technical advisory committee clearance. By the time the project was set to begin its initial phases, Reddy died in an accident. Later chief ministers reduced funding for Jalayagnam.

== The project ==
This project accords the highest priority for the development of irrigation infrastructure, particularly in backward and drought-prone areas, by taking up this program in a big way. Jala Yagnam includes a number of irrigation projects by construction of reservoirs and lift irrigation systems for lifting water from major rivers, particularly from Godavari, to provide immediate irrigation benefits. The Jala Yagnam program was to complete 32 major and 17 medium irrigation projects at a cost of Rs. 650 billion to provide irrigation to an extent of 7.1 million acres besides stabilization of an existing ayacut of 2,132,000 acres while providing drinking water to a population of 12 million and generating power to the tune of 1700 MW. Eight of these projects were to be completed before the kharif season of 2006.

The project requires the construction of 78 dams and is expected to displace significant numbers of people whose villages will be submerged. The irrigation development was almost stagnant for the last decade, and the previous governments concentrated on hi-tech and neglected the agricultural sector, on which approximately 70% of the population depends. The fact that 26% of the population, mostly in rural areas, was living below the poverty line made Dr. Reddy wonder whether science and technology had made a significant difference in the quality of life in rural areas, compared to towns and cities. Also, the suicides of many farmers from the state made Dr. Y. S. Rajasekhara Reddy give more significance to the irrigation sector. Having recognized the importance of the agricultural sector for faster economic development, Dr. Y. S. Rajasekhara Reddy started concentrating largely on its development and introduced several schemes for the benefit of the farmers, one of which is the Jala Yagnam project.

In the past 50 years, a total ayacut of 6.5 million acres was developed in the state. Jala Yagnam is expected to double the area under irrigation. It would constitute a major component of the Central government programme National Irrigation Mission's (NIM) target of bringing ten million hectares of land (25 million acres) in the country under the plough. The largest allocation of funds, during 2004-09, is for irrigation, as the government considers irrigation an important growth engine.

The most expensive of the projects are the lift irrigation projects intended to irrigate the dry Telangana region and supply water to the Anantapur - Ongole - Mahabubnagar area which is "turning into a desert". With the land level being 300 metres above the water level, lift irrigation is supposed to be the only way to take water to the dry region. Currently, 3,000 tmc of water from the Godavari is washed into the sea, as the land is at a higher elevation.

For the first time in the post-independence era, the Congress government took up linking of Godavari and Krishna by constructing the Indira Sagar Project and Rajiv Sagar Project across the River Godavari. By executing projects like Rajiv Sagar, Indira Sagar flood flow canal, SRSP Phase-II and so on, 2.1 million acres of parched land in Telangana region would be made fertile.

== Maps ==
This is the link which redirects to the map in which all the Jalayagnam projects are seen and also projects which have been already finished by the Andhra Pradesh government. Details such as estimated and actual costs of Jalayagnam projects are also included. For completed projects, details like the district they are in and rivers they are on are also included.

Jalayagnam and other completed projects'map

== Controversies ==
The documents obtained from Right to Information Act of India indicates that show the irregularities that were committed range from violation of the common tender document to illegally made excessive payments for the works done and fraudulently claimed to have been done.

== List of projects ==
- 55 major irrigation projects
1. Alisagar Lift Irrigation Scheme
2. Chagalnadu Lift Irrigation Scheme
3. Dummugudem Hydro Electric Project
4. Galeru-Nagari Sujala Sravanthi Project
5. Gundlakamma Project
6. Guru Raghavendra Lift Irrigation Scheme
7. H N S D W S PROJECT
8. Handri Niva Sujala Sravanthi Drinking Water Supply Scheme
9. Inchampally Project
10. J. Chokka Rao (Godavari) Lift Irrigation Scheme
11. Jawaharlal Nehru (Nettempadu) Lift Irrigation Scheme
12. K.C. Canal Modernisation
13. Lendi Project
14. Lower Penganga Project - R.B. Canal
15. Mahathma Gandhi (Kalwakurthy) Lift Irrigation Scheme
16. Nagarjunasagar Project
17. Polavaram (Indira Sagar) Project
18. Pranahitha PROJECT
19. Priyadarshini Jurala Project
20. Pulichintala Project
21. Pushkaram Lift Irrigation Scheme
22. Rajiv (Bhima) Lift Irrigation Scheme
23. Rajiv Sagar (Dhummu Gudem) Lift Irrigation Project
24. S.L.B.C (A M R) Project
25. S.R.S.P (Flood Flow Canal)
26. Sangam Banda ( PART OF BHEEMA L I ) PROJECT
27. Singoor Project
28. Somasila Project
29. Somasila - Swarnamukhi Link Canal
30. Sri Padha Sagar (Yellampally Project)
31. Sriramasagar Project Stage- I
32. Sriramasagar Project Stage- II
33. Srisailam Right Branch Canal Scheme
34. TadipudiI Lift Irrigation Scheme
35. Tarakarama L I Scheme
36. TBP. HLC. Stage-II Project
37. Telugu Ganga Project
38. Thotapally Barrage Scheme
39. Vamsadhara Project Phase-II of Stage-II
40. Vamsadhara Project Stage I
41. Vamshadhara Phase I of Stage II (RMC)
42. Velogonda Project
43. Yeleru Reservoir Project
- 36 medium irrigation projects
1. Bhupathipalem Reservoir Scheme
2. Gollavagu Reservoir Project
3. Gundlavagu Project
4. Jalimudi Diversion Scheme
5. Janjhavathi Reservoir Project
6. Jerrikona Project
7. Kanupur Canal
8. Koilsagar Lift Irrigation Scheme
9. Komaram Bheem Project
10. Mathadivagu Reservoir Project
11. Modikuntavagu Project
12. Murreduvagu Project
13. Musurumilli Reservoir Scheme
14. Palemvagu Project
15. Paleru Reservoir Scheme
16. Pampa Reservoir Project
17. Peddagavagu (NEELWAI)
18. Peddagedda Reservoir
19. Peddavagu Diversion Scheme (JAGANNATHAPUR)
20. Peddavagu Project (DASNAPUR)
21. Peddavagu Project (BARKAGUDEM)
22. Railvagu Reservoir Project
23. Tarakarama Thirtha Sagaram
24. Veligallu Reservoir Project
