= MPR Dam =

Coordinates: 14°52′14″N 77°24′34″E

The Mid Penna Reservoir Dam, also known as the MPR Dam, is an irrigation project located across the Penna river in Anantapur district of Andhra Pradesh, India. It works mainly as a balancing reservoir under the Tungabhadra high-level irrigation canal, which originates from the Tungabhadra Dam. It is situated near Marutla village in Kudair mandal.
