= Srisailam Dam =

Dam in Andhra Pradesh and Telangana, India

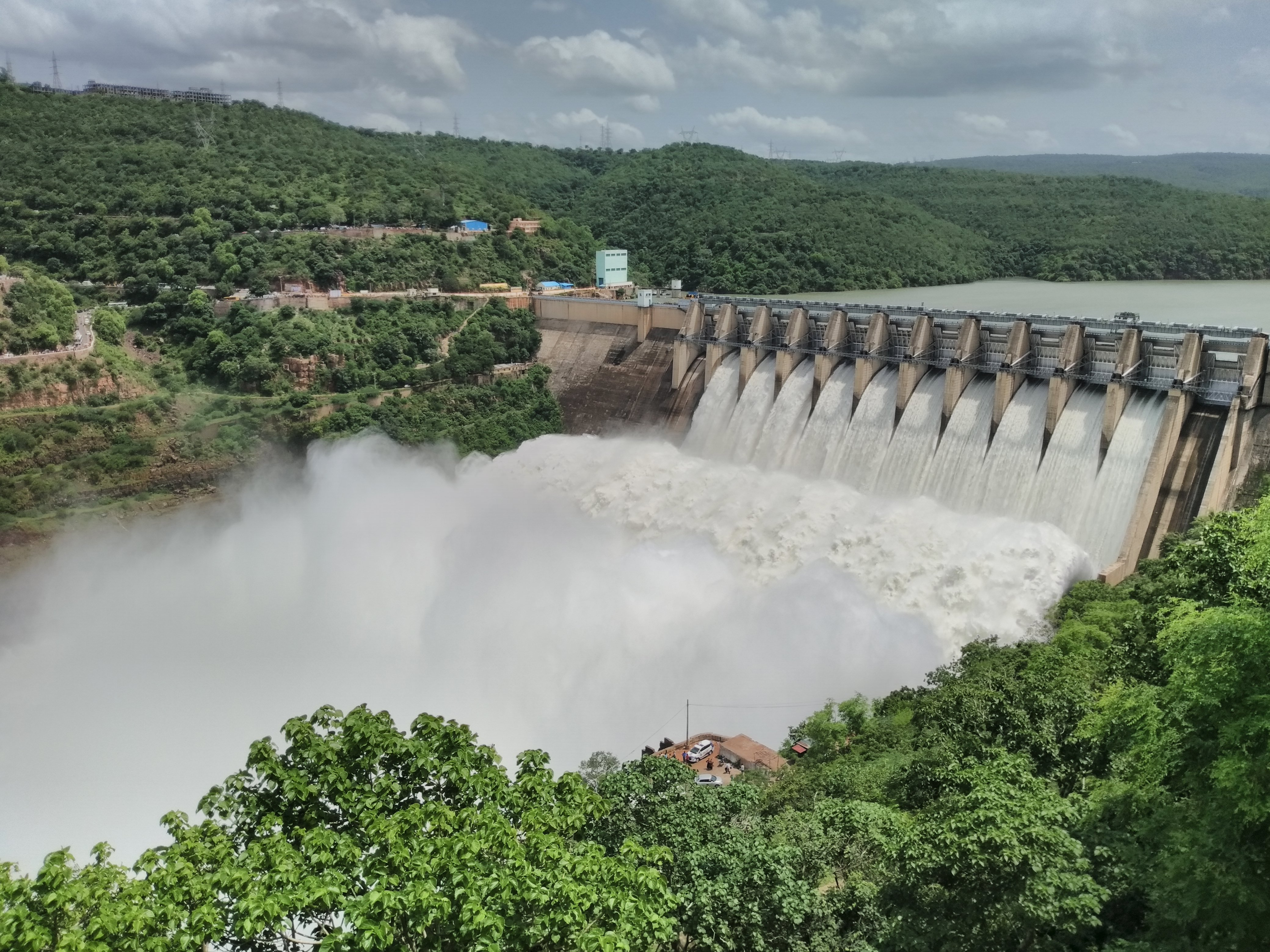

- Location within Andhra Pradesh
- Location: Nandyal district, Andhra Pradesh & Nagarkurnool district, Telangana
- Coordinates: 16°05′23″N 78°53′54″E
- Purpose: Hydroelectric, Irrigation & Water supply
- Construction began: 1960
- Opening date: 1981; 45 years ago
- Construction cost: ₹10 billion
- Owner: Government of Andhra Pradesh

Dam and spillways
- Type of dam: Gravity & Masonry dam
- Impounds: Tungabhadra River, Krishna River
- Height: 145.10 m (476 ft)
- Length: 512 m (1,680 ft)
- Spillway capacity: 38369 m^{3}/s

Reservoir
- Creates: Srisailam Reservoir (Neelam Sanjeevareddy Sagar)
- Total capacity: 216 tmcft (6.1 km^{3})
- Catchment area: 206,040 km^{2} (79,550 sq mi)
- Surface area: 616 km^{2} (238 sq mi)

Power Station
- Operators: TSGENCO(left bank) and APGENCO(right bank)
- Turbines: 6 × 150 MW (200,000 hp) reversible Francis-type (left bank); 7 × 110 MW (150,000 hp) Francis type (right bank)
- Installed capacity: 1,670 MW (2,240,000 hp)

The Srisailam Dam is a gravity dam built on the confluence of Tungabhadra River and Krishna River. Its hydroelectric power station is India's 2nd largest by capacity. It is located in the Nallamala Hills near the temple town Srisailam.

The dam spans a deep gorge between the districts Nandyal (Andhra Pradesh) and Nagarkurnool (Telangana). It has a maximum height of 143 metres (470 ft) and a length of 512 metres (1,680 ft). The reservoir has a surface area of 616 square kilometres (238 sq mi) and a gross storage capacity of 216 tmcft (6.1 km^{3}). The active storage capacity is 178.74 tmcft (5.061 km^{3}) corresponding to the full reservoir level at 270 metres (885 ft) MSL. The minimum draw-down level of the reservoir is at 215 metres (705 ft) MSL and the corresponding dead storage is 3.42 tmcft (0.097 km^{3}). There are two turbine halls: an underground building on the left bank with six 150 MW (200,000 hp) reversible Francis-pump turbines for pumped-storage operation (each turbine can pump 200 m^{3}/s) and a semi-underground building on the right bank with seven 110 MW (150,000 hp) Francis-turbine generators.

A tail pond dam/weir located 14 km downstream of Srisailam dam is under advanced stage of construction to hold the water released by the hydro turbines and later pump back into the Srisailam reservoir by operating the turbines in pump mode. The weir portion got breached in November 2015 unable to withstand the normal water release from the hydropower stations. Tail pond weir was completed during the year 2017 and pumping mode operation is being done even when the downstream Nagarjuna Sagar reservoir water level is below 531.5 feet (162 m) MSL. The tail pond has nearly 1 tmcft (0.028 km^{3}) live storage capacity.

== History ==
The Srisailam project began in 1960, Initially only as a power project. After several delays, the main dam was finally completed twenty years later in 1980 July 26. In the meantime the project was converted into a multipurpose facility with a generating capacity of 770 MW (1,030,000 hp) by its second stage which was completed in 1987. The dam is to provide water for an estimated 2,000 km^{2} (770 sq mi). Under the right bank branch canal 790 km^{2} (310 sq mi) in Kurnool, Nandyal and Kadapa districts will have assured irrigation. From the initial modest estimate of ₹38.47 crore for a power project the total cost of the multipurpose project was estimated to cross ₹1000 crore in its enlarged form. The dam has alone cost ₹404 crore together with the installation of four generating sets of 110 MW each. The right bank branch canal is estimated to cost ₹449 crore and the initial investment of ₹140 crore has been provided by the World Bank. The projected cost-benefit ratio of the project has been worked out at 1:1.91 at 10% interest on capital outlay. In 1998 a coffer dam was over topped by flooding. The power house required repairs and did not generate power for a year. On 2 October 2009, Srisailam dam experienced a record inflow which threatened the dam. It was built under the engineering leadership of Kanuri Lakshmana Rao.

== Irrigation ==
Srisailam right main canal (SRMC) is constructed with 44,000 ft^{3}/s capacity at Srisailam reservoir level of 269.22 metres (883 ft) MSL to feed Veligodu reservoir (16.95 tmcft; 0.480 km^{3}), Brahmamsagar Reservoir (17.74 tmcft; 0.502 km^{3}), Alaganoor reservoir (2.97 tmcft; 0.084 km^{3}), Gorakallu reservoir (12.44 tmcft; 0.352 km^{3}), Owk reservoir (4.15 tmcft; 0.118 km^{3}), Gandikota Reservoir (26.86 tmcft; 0.761 km^{3}), Mylavaram reservoir (9.98 tmcft; 0.283 km^{3}), Somasila reservoir (78 tmcft; 2.2 km^{3}) and Kandeleru reservoir (68 tmcft; 1.9 km^{3}) with nearly 235 tmcft (6.7 km^{3}) total storage capacity. This canal also supplies water to Telugu Ganga project which supplies Krishna river water to Chennai city for its drinking purpose. This main canal by feeding water to K. C. Canal, Srisailam right bank canal, Telugu Ganga canal and Galeru Nagari canal irrigates vast area in Kurnool, Nandyal district, Kadapa, Chittoor and Nellore districts.

Handri-Neeva lift canal by drawing water from the Srisailam reservoir, which supplies drinking water in all the districts of Rayalaseema. Veligonda reservoir receives water by gravity through tunnels to irrigate lands in Nellore, Kadapa, Markapuram and Prakasam districts. Kalwakurthy lift irrigation scheme by drawing water from the Srisailam reservoir, supplies irrigation water in Mahbubnagar and Nalgonda districts

Srisailam left bank canal will receive water by gravity through tunnels to irrigate lands in Nalgonda district. Tunnel work is not complete and the required water has been provided to most of the project area by lifting water from the downstream Nagarjuna Sagar reservoir.

== Dam Maintenance and Safety ==
Systematic Neglect and absence of diversion of funds is evident in maintenance of the dam and lack of any modernization attempts of the Powerhouse. The officers report a shortage of maintenance staff.

Safety concerns to the 2nd largest Hydroelectric project in the country have been raised over the years and have been assessed false subsequently. In 2009, the dam, designed for a maximum flood of 1,900,000 ft^{3}/s, endured a flood of 2,550,000 ft^{3}/s. According to a survey conducted in the summer of 2018, the scouring resulted in the formation of a huge pit in the apron downstream the dam. And a structure protecting the ‘toe’ and foundation of the main dam has weakened. Efforts are not yet made to repair and maintain the dam.

In May 2025, the National Dam Safety Authority (NDSA) inspected the dam and raised concerns about the condition of the Srisailam dam. Over the years, damage has built up around the plunge pool and some key protection works, mostly due to aging and a lack of proper maintenance. Though several expert panels have suggested fixes in the past, the state hasn’t followed through on most of them. NDSA says that ignoring these observations could threaten major structures and cities like Vijayawada and Amaravati.

== Power generation optimization ==
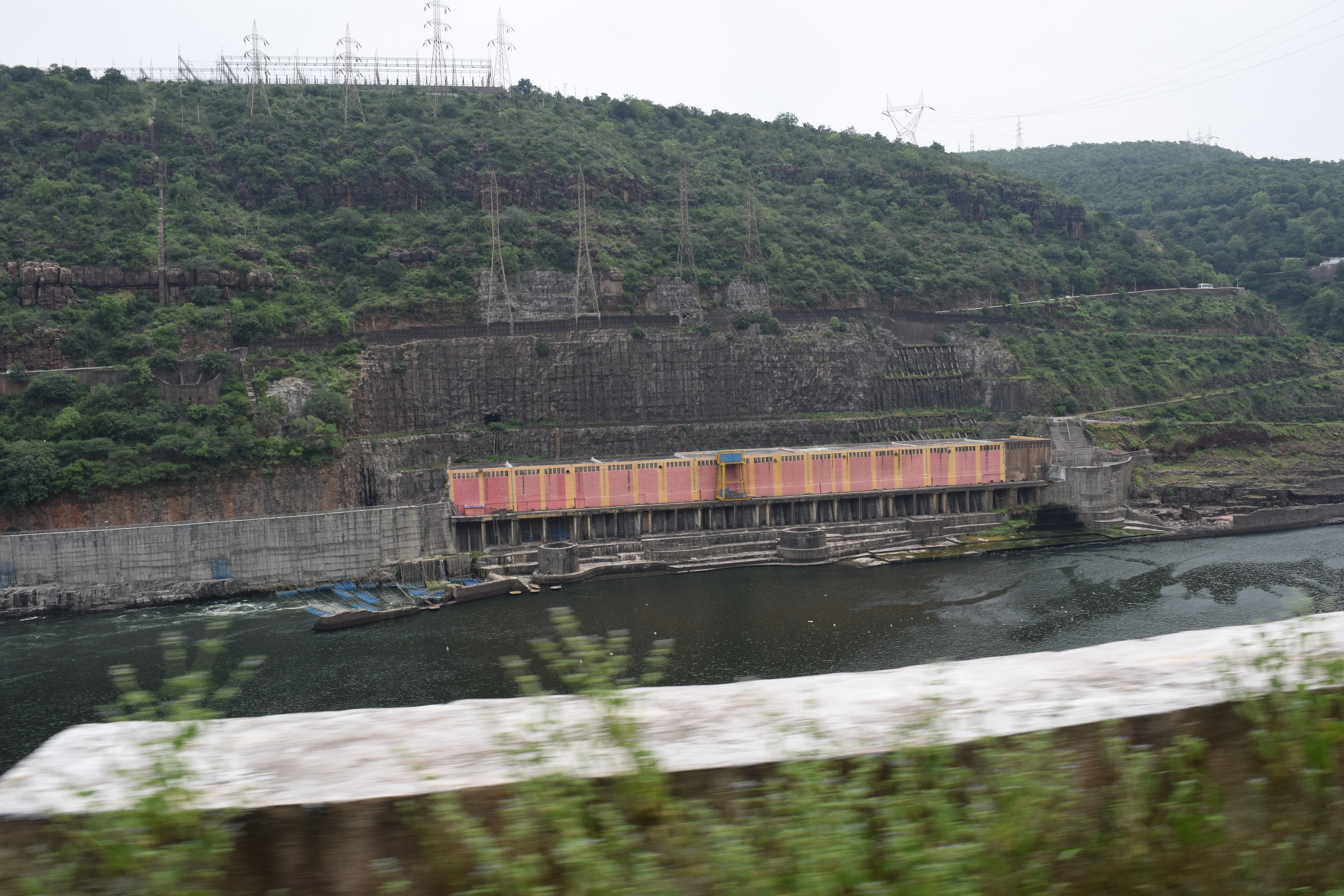
Srisailam right bank power house

At present, the initial inflows into Srisailam reservoir are stored excessively without being used for power generation. The flood water fills the remaining empty Srisailam reservoir quickly and most of the flood water overflows into the downstream Nagarjunasagar reservoir without being used for power generation. The endeavor shall be to fill the Nagarjuna Sagar reservoir fully with the uniform water released through the power generating units.

The existing right bank power station (770 MW) can be converted into pumped storage hydroelectric power (PSHP) to operate in pumping mode when the downstream Nagarjuna Sagar reservoir level is above 560 feet (171 m) MSL. The PSHP can be used for energy storage purposes on daily basis and to transfer Godavari water to the Srisailam reservoir during drought years. Alternately, the tunnel of the existing power station can be used for a new PSHP station to pump water from the Nagarjuna Sagar reservoir to the Srisailam reservoir.

== Pumped storage hydropower potential ==
Srisailam reservoir, serving as lower level reservoir, has potential to install nearly 77,000 MW high head pumped storage hydroelectric plants on its right side.

== See also ==
- Krishna Water Disputes Tribunal
- List of power stations in India
- List of dams and reservoirs in India
- List of hydroelectric power station failures
- Nagarjuna Sagar tail pond
