= Polavaram Project =

Dam in Eluru district, Andhra Pradesh, India

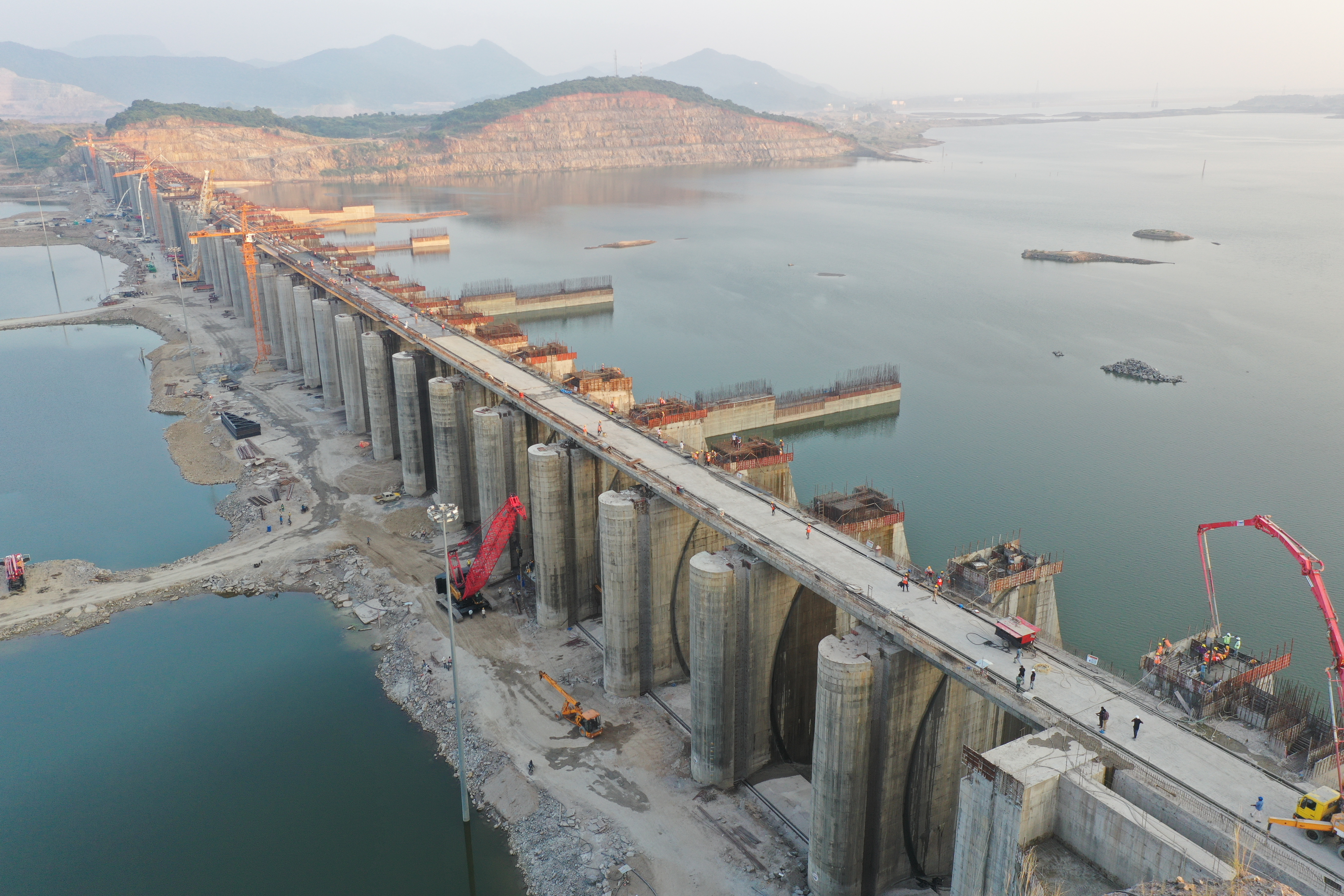
- Polavaram Project circa Nov 2020
- Map with dam, right, and left main canals. Interactive map of Polavaram Project
- Country: India
- Location: Polavaram, Eluru district, Andhra Pradesh
- Coordinates: 17°17′21″N 81°39′05″E
- Purpose: Hydroelectric, irrigation & water supply
- Status: Under construction
- Construction began: 2003
- Opening date: 2029 July (Expected)
- Owner: Government of Andhra Pradesh
- Operator: Andhra Pradesh

Dam and spillways
- Type of dam: Concrete spill way (1,128 m (1.128 km)), Non over flow concrete dam (140 m (0.14 km)) & Earth cum rock fill dam (2,454 m (2.454 km))
- Impounds: Godavari River
- Height: 39.28 m (129 ft) up to top of earth dam above the lowest river bed.
- Length: 3,722 m (3.722 km)
- Spillway type: Chute spillway
- Spillway capacity: 3,600,000 cusecs at 140 ft msl

Reservoir
- Creates: Polavaram Reservoir
- Total capacity: 194 tmcft at FRL 150 ft msl
- Active capacity: 175 tmcft (above 25.72 m msl crest level of spillway)
- Inactive capacity: 19 tmcft (below 25.72 m msl)
- Catchment area: 307,800 km^{2} (118,800 mi^{2})
- Surface area: 600 km^{2} (230 sq mi)
- Maximum water depth: 32.08 m at FRL 150 ft msl

Power Station
- Operator: APGENCO
- Commission date: 2026
- Turbines: 12 × 80 MW Kaplan-type (left bank side)
- Installed capacity: 960 MW (under construction)
- Annual generation: 2.29 billion kWh
- Website ppa.gov.in/WPSCore/Common/WebPages/Home/Index.aspx, apgenco.gov.in/Main/polavaram_project

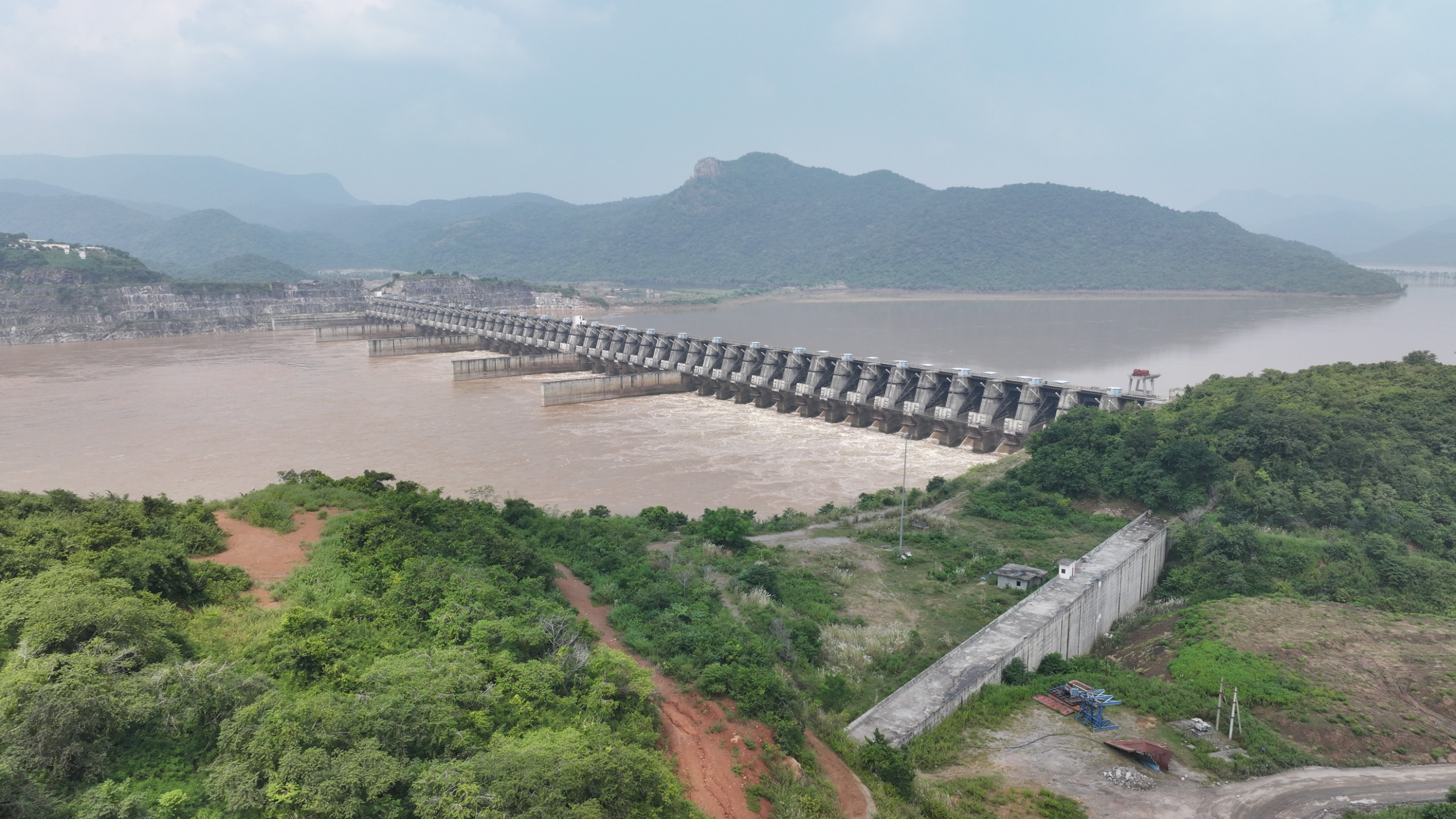
Polavaram Project Spillway

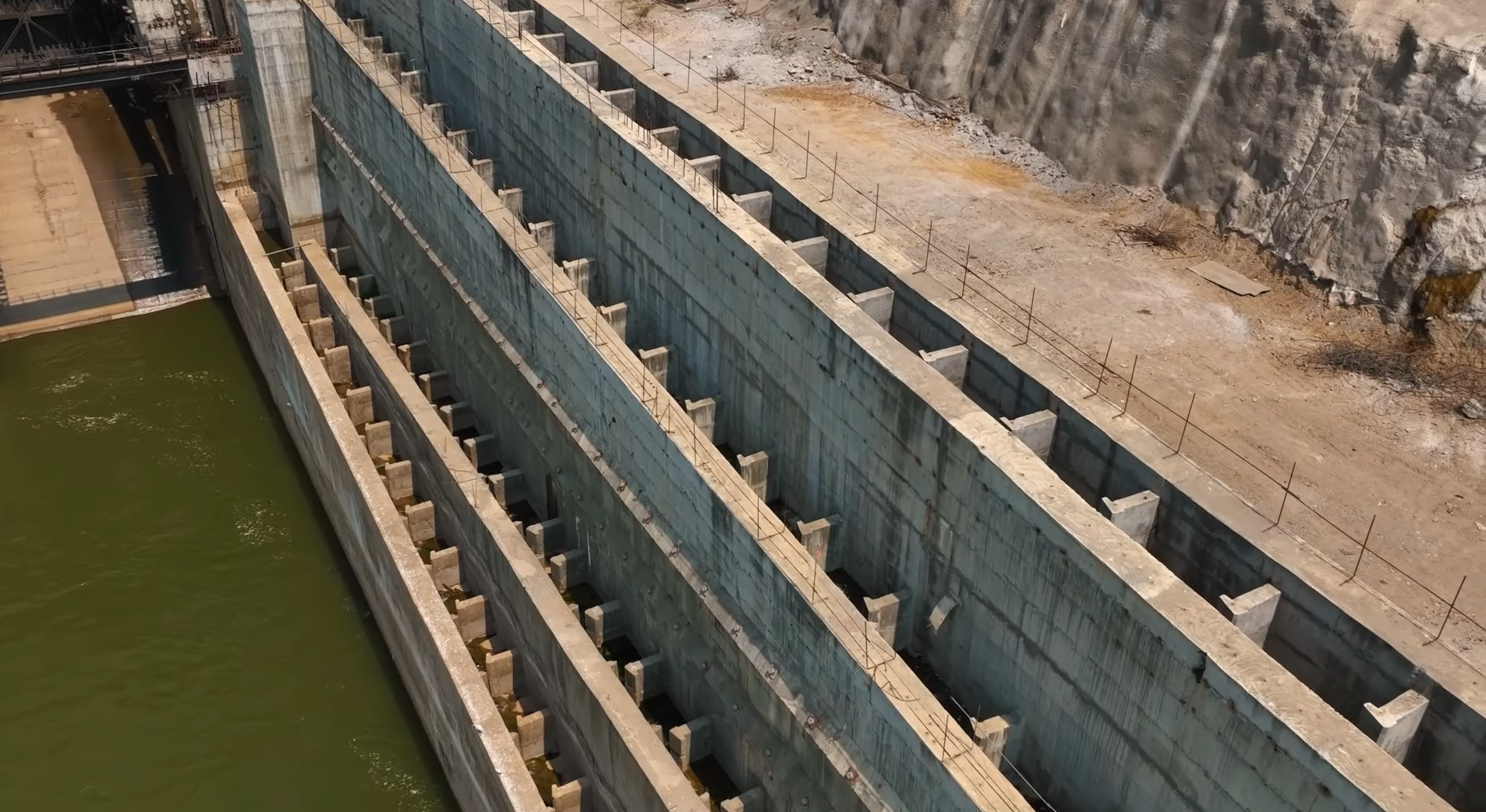
Polavaram Project Fish Ladder

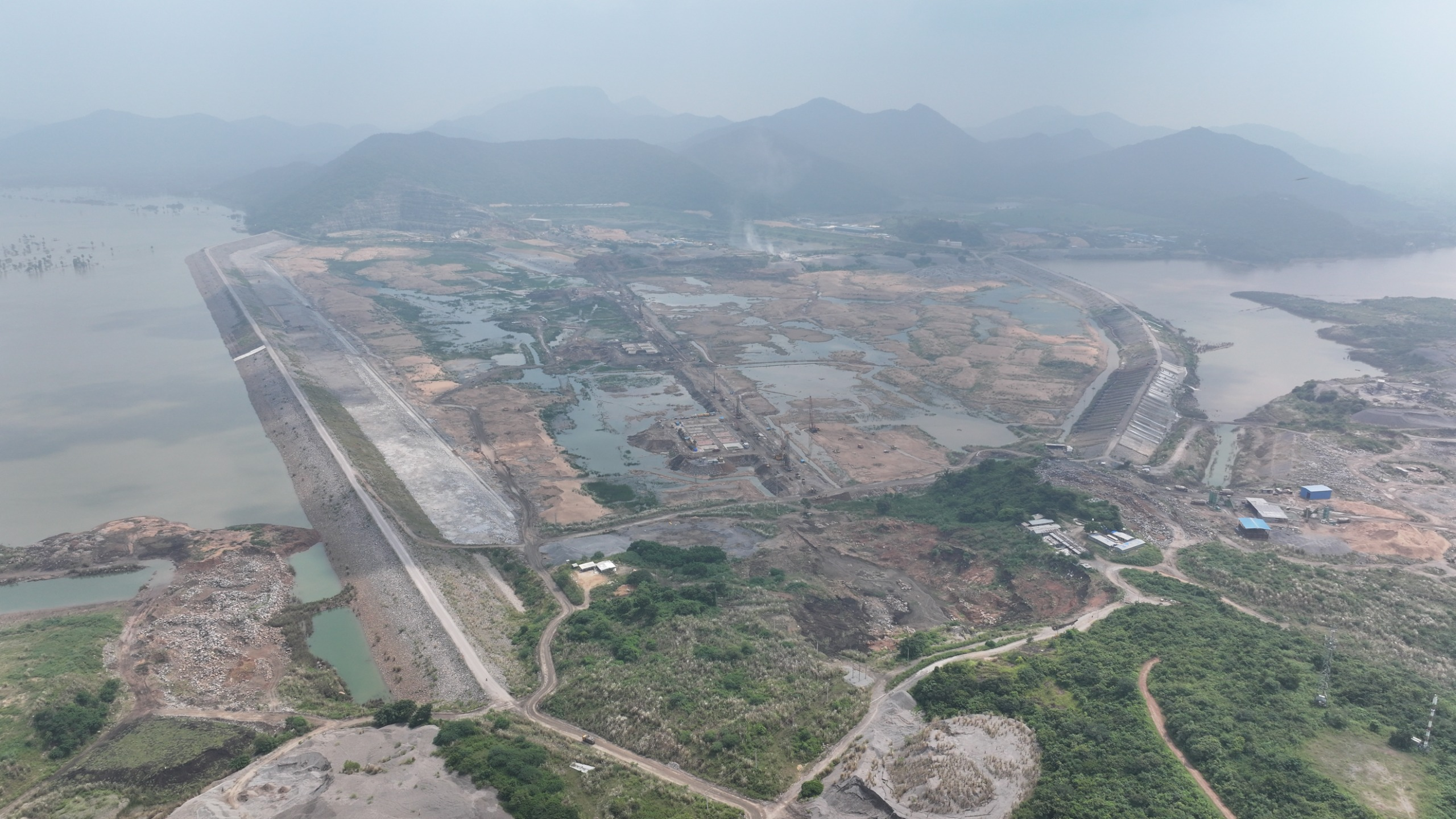
Polavaram Project Upper and Lower Cofferdams

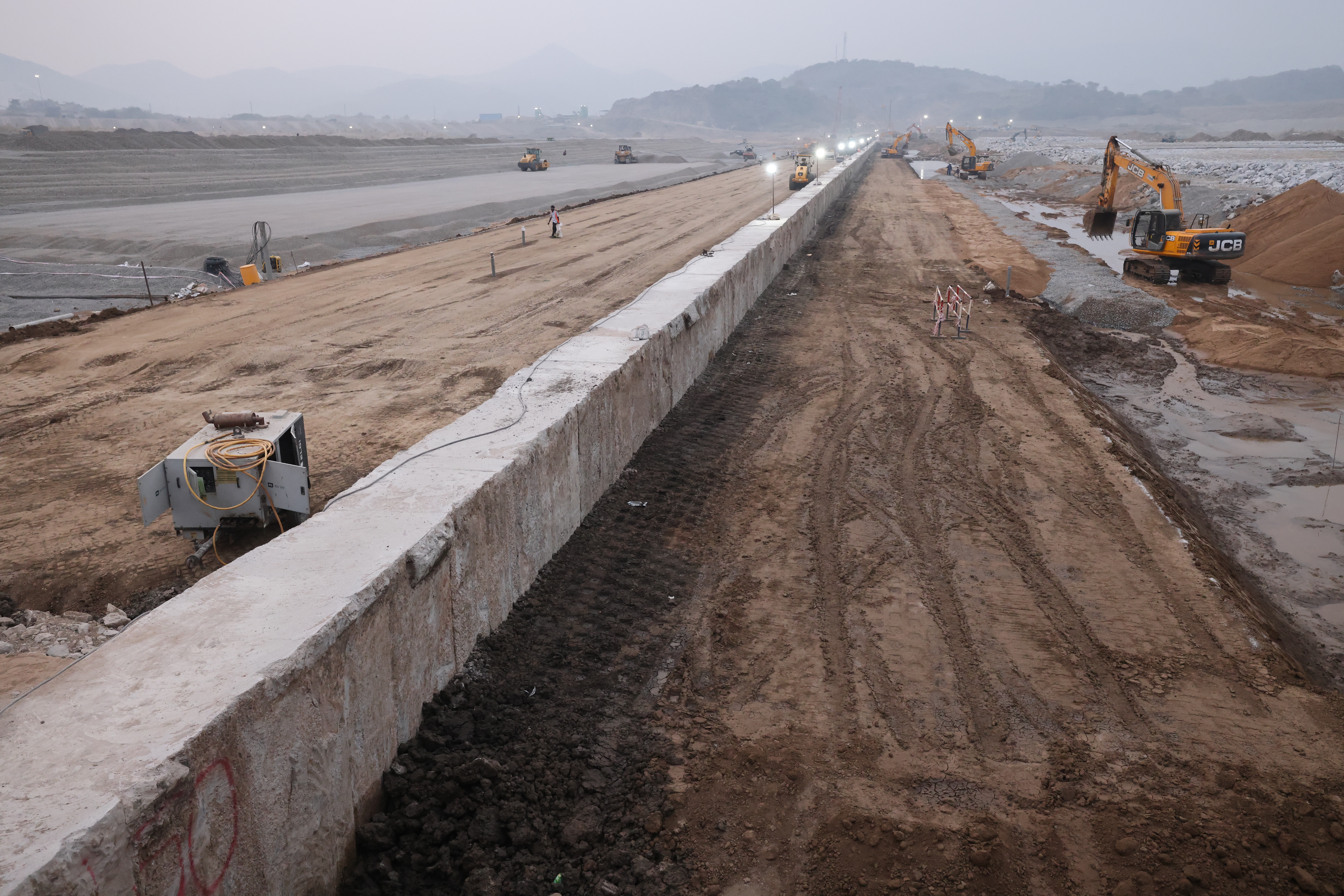
Polavaram Project Diaphragm Wall

The Polavaram Project is an under-construction multi-purpose irrigation project on the Godavari River in the Eluru District and Polavaram District in Andhra Pradesh, India. The project has been accorded National Project status by the Central Government of India. Its reservoir back water spreads up to the Dummugudem Anicut, i.e. approx 150 kilometres (93 mi) back from Polavaram dam on main river side and approx 115 kilometres (71 mi) on the Sabari River side. Thus, back water spreads into parts of Chhattisgarh and Odisha States. Polavaram Hydroelectric Project (HEP) and National Waterway 4 are under construction on left side of the river. It is located 40 kilometres (25 mi) upstream of Sir Arthur Cotton Barrage in Rajamahendravaram City and 25 kilometres (16 mi) from Rajahmundry Airport.

== History ==
In July 1941, the first conceptual proposal for the project was mooted by the Madras Presidency. Diwan Bahadur L. Venkatakrishna Iyer, then Chief Engineer in the Presidency's irrigation department, made the first survey of the project site and made a definitive proposal for a reservoir at Polavaram. Sri Iyer not only envisaged cultivation of 350,000 acres (140,000 ha) over two crop seasons through this project, but also planned for a 40 MW hydroelectric plant within the project. The project, when it was conceived in 1946–47, was estimated to cost Rs 129 crore.

In 1980, Chief Minister of Andhra Pradesh Tanguturi Anjaiah laid the foundation stone for the Polavaram irrigation project. The Polavaram Project Authority was constituted by the Union Cabinet in May 2014 and the construction of project head works were taken up. The Naidu government acquired the necessary lands for the right canal by solving court petition issues of farmers who lost their agricultural lands from both districts of West Godavari and Krishna; the Pattiseema Lift Irrigation Project has been launched in order to pump the Godavari river water and sent it to the Krishna river. In June, the state was bifurcated under the Andhra Pradesh Reorganisation Act. In December 2017, it was reported that the project contractor, Transstroy, was seeking a deadline extension and a budget escalation. Transstroy was reported to have its ₹4,300 crore loan turn NPA in July 2015. In January 2018, the state government signed a new contract for the project spillway, spill channel, and stilling basin concrete work with Navayuga Engineering. By June 2018, 110,355 acres (44,659 ha) of the required 168,213 acres (68,073 ha) had been acquired. On 11 June 2018, the Polavaram diaphragm wall was completed, marking a significant milestone in the project construction. On 7 January 2019, the Polavaram project entered the Guinness Book of World Records by pouring 32,100 cubic meters of concrete in 24 hours by Navayuga Engineering. The project beat the existing record of 21,580 cubic meters, which was achieved by Abdul Wahid Bin Shabib, RALS Contracting LLC and Alfa Eng. Consultant (all UAE), in Dubai between 18 and 20 May in 2017. The Chief minister of Andhra Pradesh N. Chandrababu Naidu unveiled the first crest gate on 24 December 2018.

== Design and technical details ==
The Polavaram Project incorporates several major hydraulic and geotechnical structures, including an earth-core-rock fill (ECRF) dam and a gated concrete spillway—the world’s largest spillway by discharge capacity. According to the Polavaram Project Authority, the spillway is 1,118.40 metres (1.11840 km) long and is fitted with 48 radial gates of size 16 m × 20 m, designed to pass a probable maximum flood of 1,41,435 cumecs, equivalent to about 50 lakh cusecs.

The spillway is located on the right bank of the Godavari River rather than on the river section because the central riverbed comprises deep sand layers unsuitable for stable foundations. To achieve stable foundations and route flood flows through the specially located spillway, the entire river course was diverted for approximately 6,600 metres (6.6 km) toward the right bank. This large-scale 6,600 metres (6.6 km) river diversion is considered a rare and major river diversion operation in Indian dam engineering.

The main dam is an ECRF structure spanning approximately 2,454 metres (2.454 km) across the river course. The non-overflow dams are constructed in three distinct reaches commonly referred to as Gap 1, Gap 2, and Gap 3.

- Gap 1 — Earth-core-rock fill section
- Gap 2 — Earth-core-rock fill section, located at the deepest and most geo technically sensitive portion of the riverbed. Gap 2 is the most critical segment because it provides structural continuity between the rock abutments and the main dam body, directly influencing reservoir storage integrity and flood safety.
- Gap 3 — Concrete section (gravity/concrete structure), not an ECRF, forming part of the overall dam alignment and connecting the ECRF portions to the right abutment.

A key geotechnical feature of the project is the diaphragm wall (D-wall), running beneath the dam foundation. The diaphragm wall is 1,372 metres (1.372 km) long and extends to depths of up to 95 metres (approximately 312 feet) into the riverbed, forming a deep impermeable barrier to control seepage through the alluvial foundation and support the stability of the ECRF dam. The dam construction involves the building of a 1.5-m-thick concrete diaphragm wall up to depths from 40 to 120 m below the river bed under the earth dam, which is the first of its kind in India.

The project reservoir has a live storage of 75.2 tmcft above the canal's full supply level of 41.15 metres (135 ft) MSL and a gross storage of 194 tmcft, thereby enabling irrigation of 2,320,000 acres (940,000 ha) (including stabilisation of existing irrigated lands) in Krishna, West Godavari, Eluru, Polavaram, East Godavari, Visakhapatnam, Vizianagaram, and Srikakulam districts of Andhra Pradesh. The silt-free dead storage water of nearly 100 tmcft above the spillway crest level, 25.72 metres (84 ft) MSL, can also be used in downstream lift irrigation projects (Pattiseema lift, Tadipudi lift, Chintalapudi lift, Thorrigedda lift, Pushkara lift, Purushothapatnam lift, Venkatanagaram lift, Chagalnadu lift, etc.) and Dowleswaram Barrage during the summer months.

The project includes a fish ladder. First inbuilt fish ladder in India and the first such structure in South India. Other fish ladders exist elsewhere in the country (for example, at Farakka Barrage), but the Polavaram design integrates the fish ladder into the dam/spillway complex. The fish ladder aims to maintain fish migration pathways and reduce ecological impact on aquatic fauna.

The project also incorporates three natural hillocks that serve as natural abutments, integrating into the overall dam geometry and providing stable anchorage for adjoining dam sections. The project would constitute an earth-and-rock-fill dam 2,310 m (2.31 km) long, a spillway 907 m (0.907 km) long with 48 vents to enable discharge of 5,000,000 cu ft/s (140,000 m^{3}/s) of water. The spillway is located on the right bank of the river, for which an approach and spill channels nearly 5,500 m (5.5 km) long and 1,000 m (1.0 km) wide is envisaged involving nearly 70 million cubic meters of excavation which, is nearly 2/3 of the project's total earthwork. The maximum flood level at Polavaram is 28 metres (92 ft) MSL and lowest water level is 10.9 metres (36 ft) MSL. Two cofferdams are planned, one up to 41 metres (135 ft) MSL, to facilitate a faster pace of work on the dam to complete the first phase of the project by June 2018. With the cofferdams' inclusion and the bed level of the approach and discharge canals of the spillway increased to 17 metres (56 ft) MSL, the spillway-related rock excavation is reduced by 70%, leading to substantial cost reduction in the project's headworks cost. Ultimately, the material of cofferdams would be excavated and reused for the peripheral portions of the main earth-and-rock-fill dam.

On the left side of the river, 12 water turbines, each having an 80 Megawatt capacity, were to be installed. Without removing the upper and lower coffer dams after the construction of the ECRF dam, the 960 MW hydropower plant cannot be commissioned, as they are blocking the water passages of the powerhouse. The right canal connecting to Krishna River upstream of Prakasam Barrage (173 kilometres (107 mi) long) discharges 17,500 cu ft/s (500 m^{3}/s) at the headworks, and the left canal (182 kilometres (113 mi) long) discharges 17,500 cu ft/s (500 m^{3}/s) of water.

The Central Water Commission (CWC) acts as the apex technical body for the Polavaram Irrigation Project, holding responsibility for approving designs, vetting construction methods, and mediating inter-state submergence disputes across Andhra Pradesh, Odisha, and Chhattisgarh. The Polavaram Project Authority (PPA) is an autonomous statutory body constituted by the Government of India under the Andhra Pradesh Reorganisation Act, 2014. Megha Engineering & Infrastructures Limited (MEIL) was awarded the contract for the construction of the project in November 2019.

Indira Dummugudem lift irrigation scheme starting at 17°33′49″N 81°14′49″E is under construction to supply irrigation water for 200,000 acres in Khammam, Krishna, Eluru, and West Godavari districts, drawing Godavari River water from the backwaters of Polavaram reservoir. This is a joint project between Andhra Pradesh and Telangana states. This project was shelved and merged with another project by the Telangana state.

=== Alternate site ===
The dam could not be taken up for construction during the last century on techno-economical grounds. The proposed dam site at Polavaram is located where the river emerges from the last range of the Eastern Ghats into plains covered with deep alluvial sandy strata. At Polavaram, the river width is about 1,500 m (1.5 km). Due to the depth (more than 30 m) of the bedrock at this dam site, the dam project was not found economical to take up. However, a lucrative alternate site is located upstream of the Polavaram site where the river passes through deep gorges of Papi hill range. The width of river is about 300 m (0.30 km) in the rocky gorge stretch. This alternative was originally found to be technologically challenging due to the need to connect the reservoir with the irrigation canals via tunnels across the ghat area. Also, it would need a costly underground hydroelectric station, compared to the riverbed-based hydroelectric station. When the project was actually taken up in the year 2004, the old finalised designs at Polavaram site were adopted without re-examining the latest cost of the upstream alternate site in view of state-of-the-art construction technology of tunnels and underground hydroelectric stations.

The spillway and non-overflow dam are founded on Khondalite bedrock in the Polavaram Project. Khondalites, which are feldspar-rich, often contain soft graphite, hard garnet, etc. in addition to other minerals. Khondalites are highly weathered and hence unsuitable at dam sites.

== Construction progress ==
| Milestone | Start date | Completion Date |
|---|---|---|
| Spill way concreting work | 30 December 2016 | mostly completed as of May 2021 |
| Diaphragm wall of earth and rock fill (ECRF) dam | 1 February 2017 | 11 June 2018 |
| Jet grouting | 8 January 2018 | 29 October 2018 |
| Upper coffer dam grouting | 8 June 2017 | 8 Jan 2018 |
| Lower coffer dam grouting | 8 June 2017 | Under construction |
| Spill channel concreting work | 23 Apr 2018 | Under construction |
| Right bank canal head works | | Under construction |
| Left bank canal head works | | Under construction |
| Navigation tunnel | | Under construction |
| Right bank canal works | | Put into operation from July, 2016. |
| Left bank canal works | | Put into operation from September, 2026. |
| Hydroelectric power plant | | Under construction |
| Blocking the natural course of the Godavari by raising the upper coffer dam level above the crest level (17.3 m MSL) of river sluice vertical gates (10 nos) provided in the spillway to divert the Godavari water through these gates. | | 27 May 2021 |
| Godavari water flows diverted fully through the river sluice gates of the spillway via the approach channel | | 11 June 2021 |
| Upper coffer dam works completed. | | 31 January 2022 |
| All the 48 barrage gates are fully erected and water can be stored in the reservoir to the extent permitted by the upper coffer dam design. | | 30 June 2022 |
| Lower coffer dam works completed | | 17 February 2023 |
| Completion of inspection and field investigation of damaged diaphragm wall during the 2020 Godavari floods and the decision was given to rectify the damage that took place. | | 5 March 2023 |
| New Diaphragm Wall | | Completed 02 April 2026 |
| ECRF dams (Gap 1 and Gap 2) | 40 to 50% completed | October, 2026 |
| Water storage in the reservoir (dead storage can also be emptied by sluice gates for downstream water uses) | 30 tmcft storage up to 1.3 m above the 25.72 m msl spillway sill level | August, 2026. |

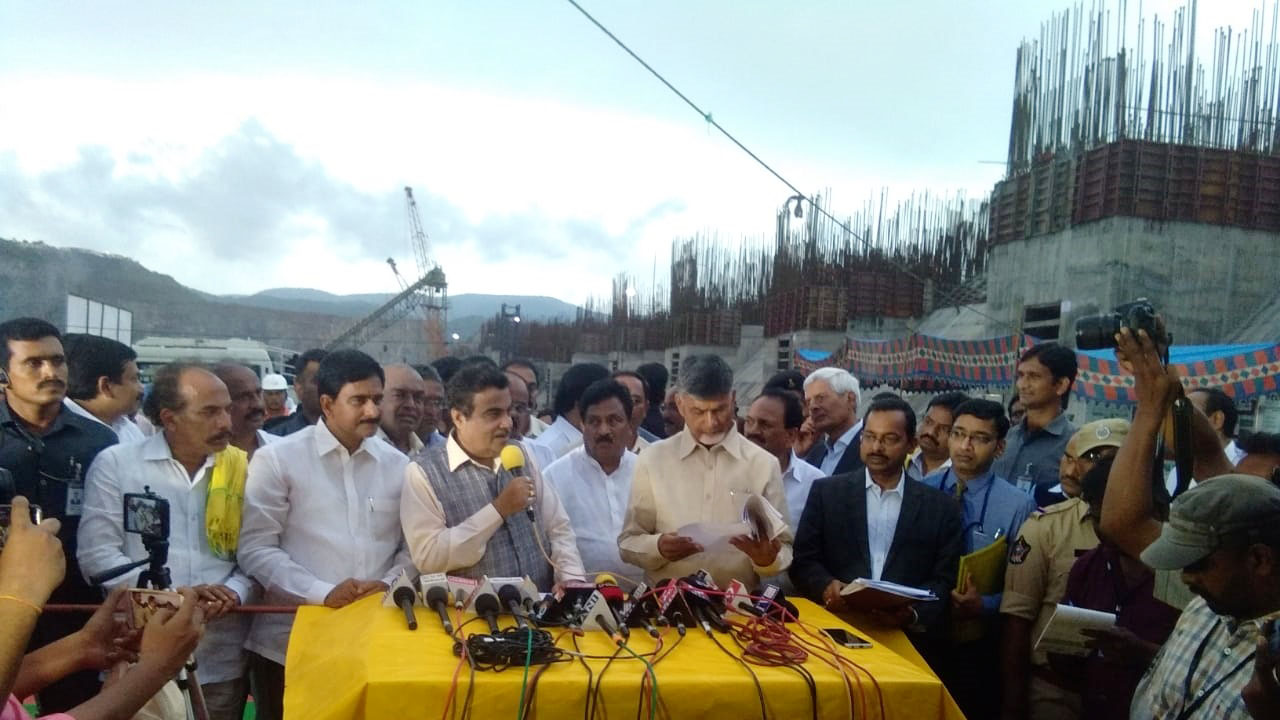
Union Minister of Water Resources Nitin Gadkari, along with Andhra Pradesh Chief Minister N. Chandrababu Naidu, Irrigation Minister Devineni Uma Maheswara Rao, and other officials, addressing the media at the Polavaram project site in 2018.

== Financing ==
Financial progress status as on 30 September 2024
| Progress | % |
|---|---|
| Main dam package | 75.76 |
| Connectivities | 61.68 |
| Right main canal | 92.75 |
| Left main canal | 72.62 |
| LA&RR | 22.58 |
| Total civil works | 76.89 |
| Overall progress | 51.08 |

The revised cost of the total project including the 960 MW power station is 47,726 crores at 2017-18 prices.

In December 2016, NABARD handed over ₹1,981 crores, as part of its loan from the Long Term Irrigation Fund (LTIF) under the Pradhan Mantri Krishi Sinchayee Yojana (PMKSY). NABARD provided a loan of ₹2,981.54 crores during 2016-17 and ₹979.36 crores during 2017-18 under the LTIF to the National Water Development Authority (NWDA) for the project.

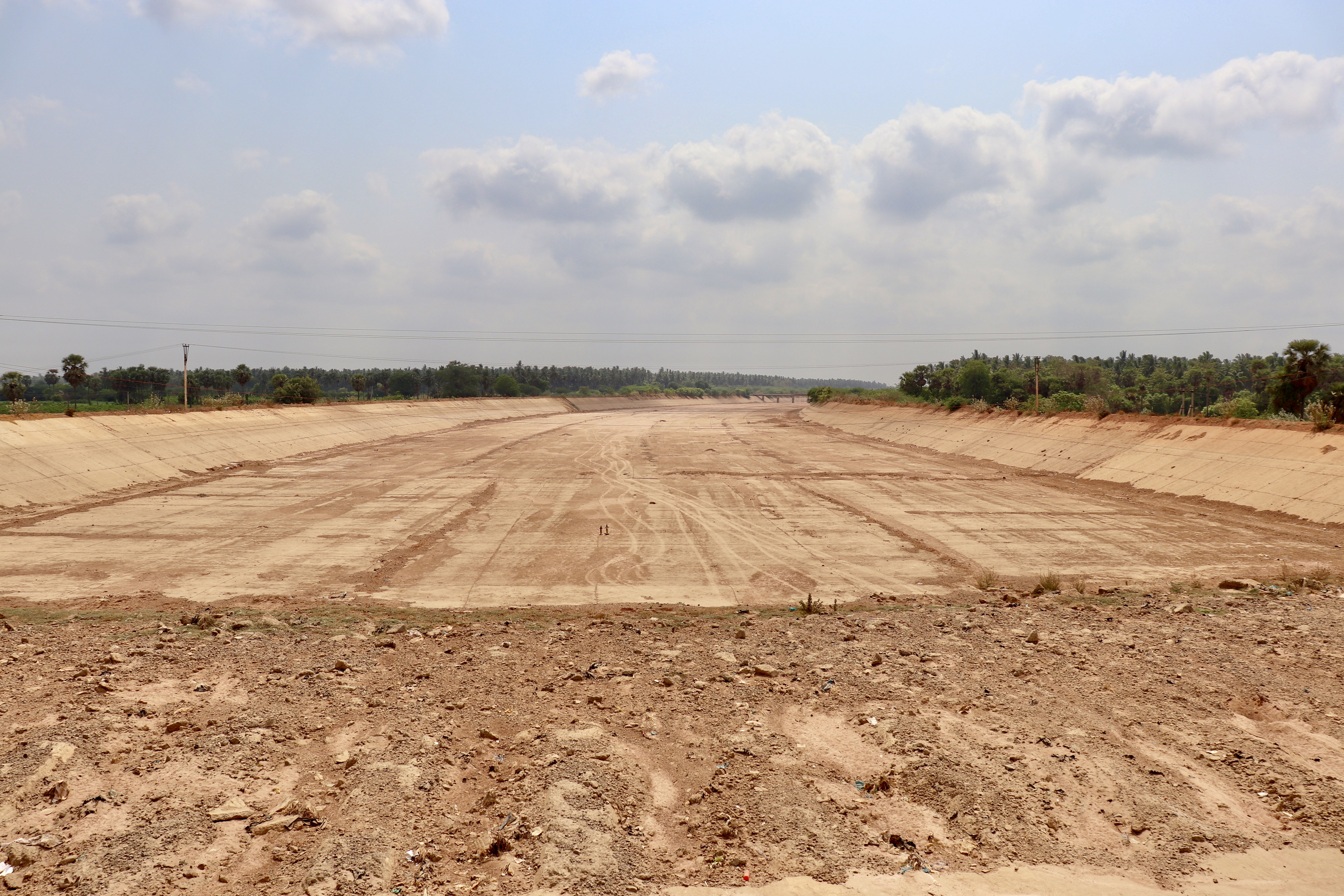
Polavaram canal near Eluru.

In its 2018 budget, Andhra Pradesh allocated ₹9000 crores to the project. In June 2018, the Central Government approved ₹1,400 crores which had been sanctioned in January, but not released, through Extra Budgetary Resources raised by NABARD. These funds were from outside the LTIF.

In January 2018, it was reported that the project cost had escalated to ₹58,319 crore. In June 2018, the Water Ministry sanctioned ₹417.44 crore as grant-in-aid under the Accelerated Irrigation Benefit Programme under the Pradhan Mantri Krishi Sinchayi Yojana (PMKSY) towards the project. By June 2018, ₹13,000 crore had been spent on the project.

An expenditure of ₹16,035.88 crores has been incurred on the project from April 2014 to December 2022. A sum of ₹13,226.04 crores has been released by the centre for the execution of the project since April 2014. Bills amounting to ₹2,390.27 crores were rejected for reimbursement by the Polavaram Project Authority (PPA). Bills amounting to ₹548 crores have been received by the PPA for examination.

Funding (Rs Crores) by Polavaram Project Authority (PPA) to AP state since 2014-15
| Financial year | 14–15 | 15–16 | 16–17 | 17–18 | 18–19 | 19–20 | 20–21 | 21–22 | 22-23 |
|---|---|---|---|---|---|---|---|---|---|
| Funds released by PPA to AP state | 245 | 590 | 2,514.7 | 1,992.56 | 1,385 | 1,780 | 2,234.2 | 1,876.7 | 1,671.23 |

== Purpose and uses ==
The National River-Linking Project, which works under the aegis of the Indian Ministry of Water Resources, was designed to overcome the deficit in water in the country. As a part of this plan, surplus water from the Himalayan rivers is to be transferred to the peninsular rivers of India. This exercise, with a combined network of 30 river-links and a total length of 14,900 kilometres (9,300 mi) at an estimated cost of US$120 billion (in 1999), would be the largest infrastructure project in the world. In this project's case, the Godavari River basin is considered as a surplus one, while the Krishna River basin is considered to be a deficit one. As of 2008, 644 tmcft of underused water from Godavari River flowed into the Bay of Bengal. But as of 2017, over 3000 tmcft are drained unused into the Bay of Bengal. Based on the estimated water requirements in 2025, the Study recommended that sizable surplus water was to be transferred from the Godavari River basin to the Krishna River basin.

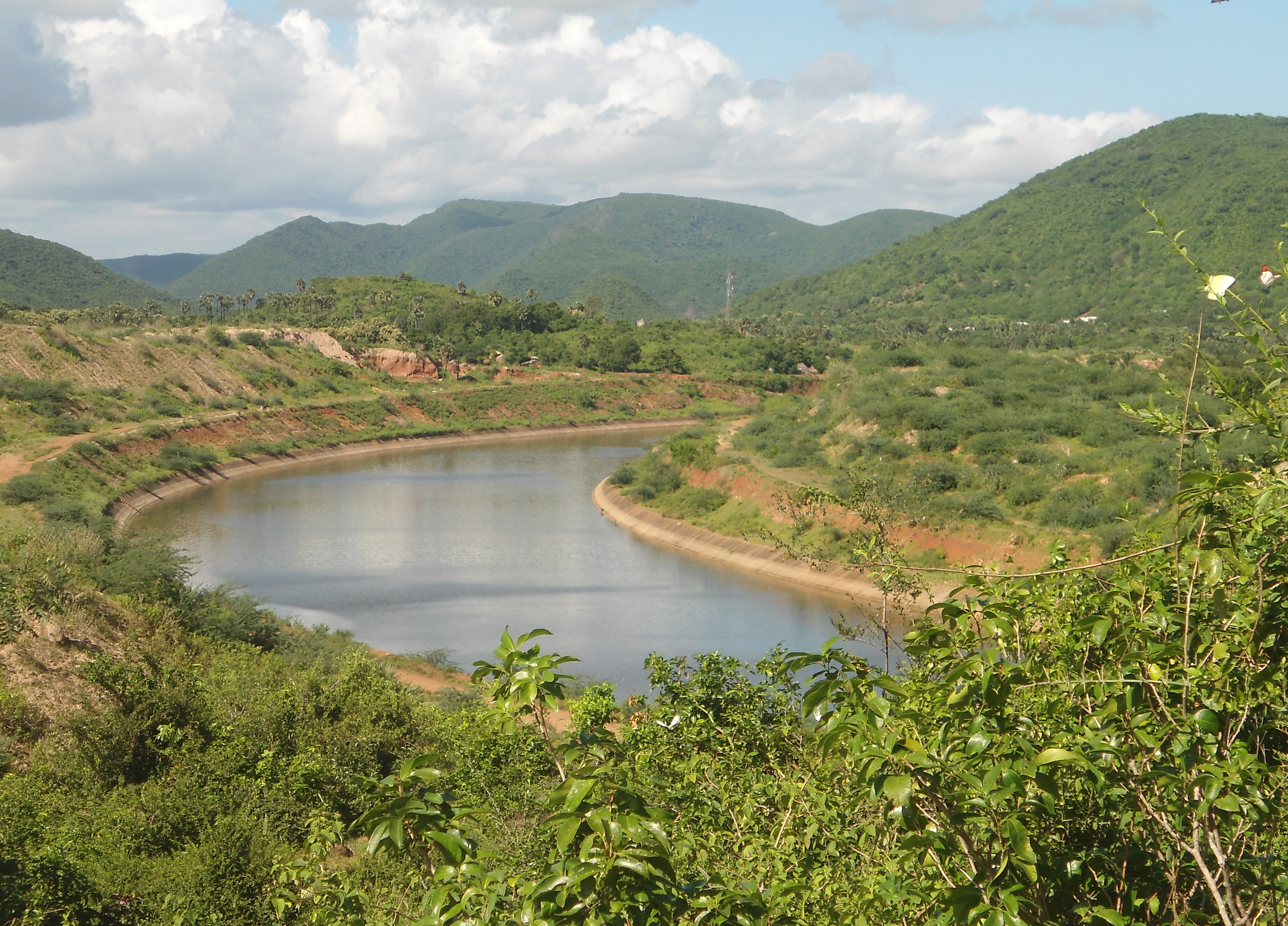
Polavaram project Canal view near Talupulamma Lova

The live storage available above 140 ft msl moderates substantially the flood wave of probable maximum flood (PMF) to reduce the effect of PMF downstream of Polavaram dam. The capacity of the right and left canals are 17,500 cusecs each. During the monsoon months (July to October), nearly 360 tmcft of Godavari flood flows at the rate of 3 tmcft per day can be diverted into the canals. At least another 190 tmcft water from the water stored in the Polavaram reservoir along with lean season inflows, excluding the downstream Godavari Delta water requirements, can be diverted into these canals. Thus the total annual water use capacity of the Polavaram project is 550 tmcft. The water storage available in Sileru river basin is used as usual for the full water requirements of the Godavari Delta when natural inflows in the river falls short of its requirements and minimum environmental flows.

The hydropower plant (960 MW) will generate 2.29 billion kWh of renewable electricity annually. Polavaram Reservoir will also create the potential to install nearly 158,000 MW of pumped-storage hydroelectric plants in the future.

=== Godavari Penna River linking ===
To stabilize the existing irrigated ayacut area under Nagarjuna sagar right canal, a new lift project construction with greenfield alignment was started in the first phase of Godavari Penna River linking project by having five step ladder pumping stages and a gravity canals to transfer 7,000 cusecs of Godavari water from Prakasam Barrage back waters into the Nagarjuna sagar right canal near Nekarikallu by utilizing 73 tmcft of Godavari water. With FRL 25M newly created Vykuntapuram Barrage pond will have back waters beyond Pokkunuru up to the toe of Pulichinthala Project. It is more economical to construct first stage pump house of this lift project to lift water from Prakasam Barrage back waters into newly created Vykuntapuram Barrage pond and the second lift stage from Vykuntapuram Barrage pond to existing K.L Rao sagar / Pulichintala Project and later lift stages from K.L Rao Sagar to Nagarjuna sagar right canal.It will shorten the length of this lift project canal, Pressure Main and fewer lift stages and also enables the lifting of water up to Srisailam Project via Existing Reversible Reverse turbine pump houses in Nagarjuna Sagar Dam and Srisailam project. It is even more economical, if we construct a new gravity canal from Ibrahimpatnam to Vykuntapuram Barrage pond to deliver the Polavaram right main canal/ Budameru diversion canal waters directly into the Vykuntapuram barrage pond since canal level is 33 m MSL at Ambapuram hill near Vijayawada. As water supply from Nagarjuna Sagar Left Bank Canal is highly erratic, Muktyala Lift Irrigation scheme is proposed by drawing water from the back waters of Vykuntapuram barrage on left bank of Krishna river.

There is a proposal to link Nagarjuna Sagar Dam across the Krishna River and Somasila Dam across Penna River with 400 km canal as part of national river linking program. With help from the Indian Government, AP Govt can construct a new canal up to Somasila Dam as per DPR of Indian Rivers Inter-link program specifications. Thus the Godavari River water will travel up to Somasila Dam and then Swarnamukhi in Chittoor district via existing Somasila Swarnamukhi link canal. GoAP can also provide water to Tamil Nadu with this Godavari water and retained water in Krishna River (15 TMC allocation of Krishna water to Telugu Ganga) will be used for other projects in Rayalaseema region.

In future a new massive dam named Palnadu Sagar across hill range near Bollapalle with 700 TMC capacity reservoir is possible using of flood water of Krishna River and Godavari River diverted with this lift project. It will submerge nearly 300Sq KM of land at FRL 260m MSL.Palnadu Sagar spillway with Francis Turbine will take and release water into Nagarjuna Sagar right canal along with Hydroelectricity power generation. Flood water of Krishna River will be pumped to Palnadu Sagar. The water stored in Palnadu Sagar will be used for irrigation and drinking in drought years.

=== Godavari Krishna River linking ===
Vykuntapuram barrage would be constructed on Krishna river located near 16°34′41″N 80°24′43″E in the upstream of Prakasam barrage with FRL at 25m MSL to receive Godavari water diverted from Polavaram dam.

A low level lift canal from the Krishna river located near 16°42′50″N 80°08′24″E at 20 m MSL in the downstream of Pulichintala dam will be executed to feed Godavari water diverted from Polavaram Dam to some of the existing command area (situated below 60 m MSL) under Nagarjuna Sagar right bank canal to facilitate extension of Nagarjuna Sagar right bank canal connecting to Kandaleru feeder canal / Somasila reservoir for serving irrigation needs in Prakasam, Potti Sriramulu Nellore and Chittur districts including Chennai drinking water supply. A branch from this lift canal is also extended up to Pulichinthala dam (FRL 53.34 m MSL) to store Godavari water in Pulichintala reservoir during drought years and to irrigate low lands along Krishna river up to Pulichintala dam.

Another high level lift canal from above Krishna river location 16°42′50″N 80°08′24″E up to 90 m MSL would be constructed to join Nagarjuna Sagar tail pond (FRL 75 m MSL) irrigating lands en route along Krishna river in Guntur district. During drought years, the water transferred by this canal to Nagarjuna Sagar tail pond is further lifted to Nagarjuna Sagar and Srisailam reservoirs with the existing pumped storage hydro units for use in all the projects receiving water from these reservoirs. This high level lift canal is an alternative to Dummugudem to Sagar lift canal planned in Telangana region which would transfer Godavari river water from Dummugudem to Nagarjuna Sagar tail pond. Ultimately the Polavaram right bank canal would be remodelled to enhance its capacity to 50,000 cusecs by raising its embankments for augmenting water transfer to meet shortages in the Krishna river basin and the needed environmental flows downstream of Prakasam barrage.

=== 25 MW power plant ===
A 25 MW hydropower station can be established utilising Polavaram right bank canal water near Vijayawada city by transferring water via Budameru river and Eluru canal to Prakasam barrage pond. The last portion of the Polavaram right bank canal is nothing but Budameru/ Velagaleru flood diversion canal which has flow limitation of 10,000 cusecs. Thus water flow from Polavaram right bank canal to Krishna River can be enhanced by constructing a 25 MW power plant.

=== Polavaram Banakacherla project ===
This project is under active consideration by the AP state but the Ministry of Environment and Forest (MoEF) returned the proposal without according preliminary approval called Terms of Reference (ToR) in June 2025. The project can get two tmcft/day for 100 days in a year by adding to water supply @ one tmcft/day on an average for 25 days from the 90 tmcft storage of AP state available in the reservoirs located in Sileru River basin. Nearly 40 tmcft live storage can also be maintained up to 145 ft MSL in the Polavaram reservoir during monsoon season per Annexure G of GWDT to moderate the inflows for feeding canals at their full capacity.The water available in the dead storage (nearly 120 tmcft) of Polavaram reservoir would be used for lean season water requirements of Dowleswaram Barrage in lieu of water supply from the stored water of Sileru River basin. With the assistance from the storages, the project can get full water more than 100 days even in a 75% dependable year at 1650 tmcft water going waste to sea. The scheme involves transferring water at 40 m MSL from Polavaram reservoir to existing Banakacherla canal regulator at 260 m MSL by many lifts. This project is economical only if all the lifted water to Banakacherla regulator is used above the 150 m MSL level without feeding to the Somasila reservoir at 100 m MSL.

=== Chinthalapudi lift irrigation project ===
This is a project under construction to supply irrigation and municipal water requirements for the upland area located between the Krishna and Godavari Rivers in AP state. Water is drawn from the Godavari River by installing a pump house. The project also supplys water to the existing command area served by the Nagarjunasagar Left Canal (NSLC) in AP state so that the saved water in the Nagarjunasagar reservoir is used for other water starved areas on the right bank side of Krishna River in the state.

=== Fresh water coastal reservoir ===
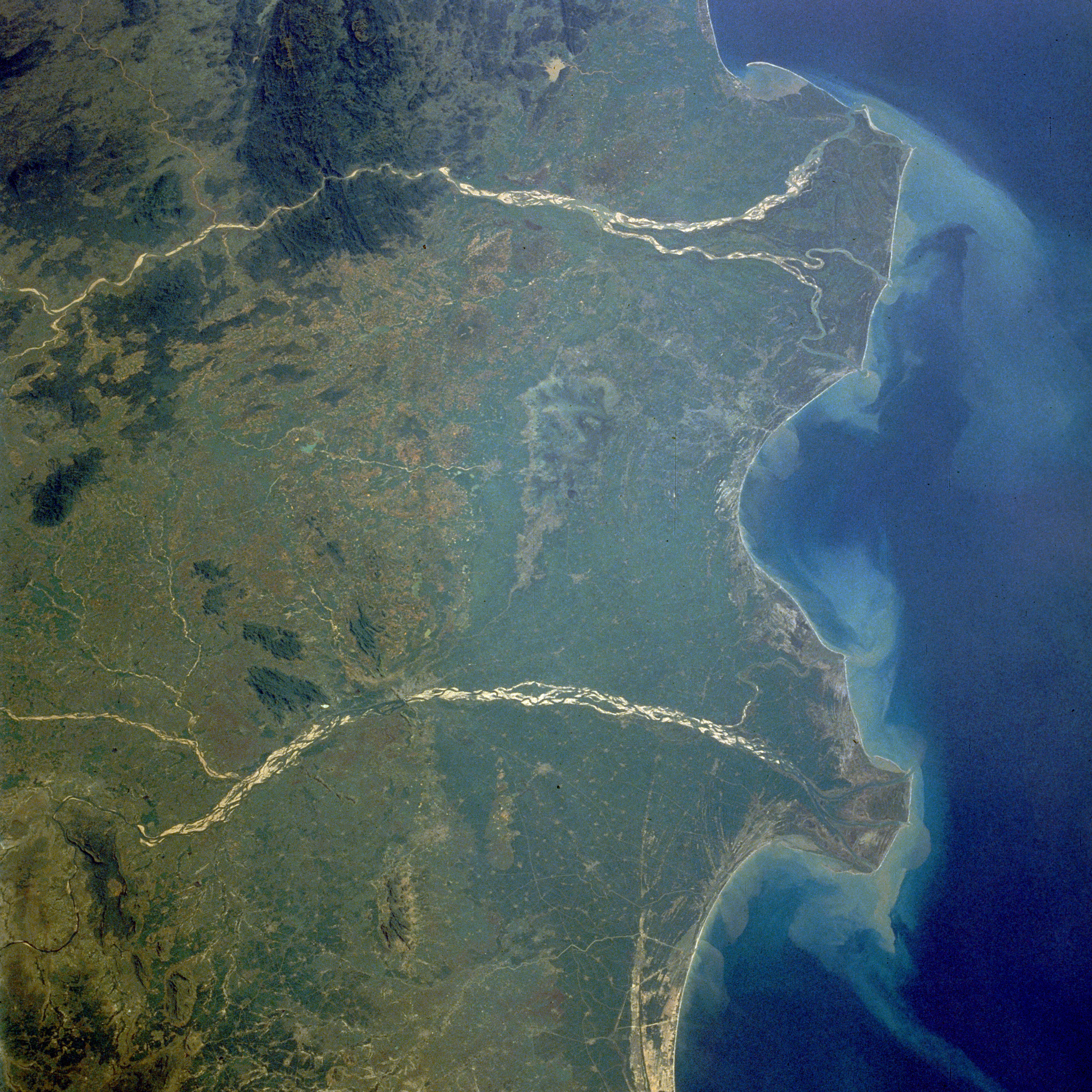
Godavari delta (top river) and Krishna River delta (bottom river in the image) extending into the Bay of Bengal.

A fresh water coastal reservoir of storage capacity 1000 Tmcft (thousand million cubic feet) could be constructed along the sea coast to store the Krishna & Godavari river flood waters for creating additional irrigated area in Prakasam, Potti Sriramulu Nellore, Cudapah, Chittoor districts and further transfer of Godavari water to Kavery river in Tamil Nadu under interstate rivers linking project This project is similar to Kalpasar Project to store Narmada River water in Gulf of Khambhat sea.

Fresh water coastal reservoirs can be established in the shallow sea area by constructing sea dikes / bunds/ causeway up to the depth of 20 meters from the coast line. Water can be pumped from this artificial freshwater lagoon throughout the year for meeting agriculture, etc. needs. Also top surface of the dike can be used as coastal road & rail rout. The proposed dikes would be similar to the land reclamation of North Sea area called Delta Works in Netherlands or Saemangeum Seawall in South Korea. The earth bunds / dikes located on sea bed at 20 meters below the sea level, is lesser challenging technically when compared to Saemangeum Seawall project which is having 36 meters average water depth.

The sea area up to 20 meters depth adjacent to coast line between the locations (near 16°19′19″N 81°42′22″E) where Vashista Godavari, the right side branch of the Godavari river, is joining the sea and the mouth of the Gundlakamma River (near 15°34′09″N 80°13′49″E), is highly suitable for creating the freshwater coastal reservoir. The average width of the sea up to 20 m depth is nearly 16 km wide and the length of the sea dikes is nearly 200 km. The area of the coastal reservoir would be nearly 2900 km^{2}. A barrage would be constructed across the Vashista Godavari river (near 16°19′41″N 81°43′15″E) near Antervedi Pallipalem town. A flood canal (1.5 km long) from this barrage would feed Godavari river water to the coastal reservoir. With 70 tmcft live storage above the full supply level of its canals and another 100 tmcft above the spillway sill level, Polavaram reservoir will assist in moderating the Godavari flood water to make adequate water flow to the coastal reservoir.

The offshore earth dam extending up to 8 m msl high, is in the form of two parallel dikes separated by a 1,000 m (1.0 km) gap. The main purpose of the twin dikes is to prevent any sea water seepage into the coastal reservoir as its water level is below the sea water level. The water level between the dikes is always maintained at a minimum of 2 m above sea level by pumping fresh water from the coastal reservoir to the 1,000 m (1.0 km) gap between the dikes. The higher level water barrier between the two dikes eliminates any seawater seepage into the coastal reservoir by establishing freshwater seepage to the sea. The rainwater falling on the coastal reservoir area and runoff water from its catchment area is adequate to cater to the seepage and evaporation losses from the coastal reservoir. The 180 km long, 1,000 m (1.0 km) gap between the two dikes is also used as deep water mega harbor for shipping, ship breaking, ship building, etc. For shipping purpose, the breakwater outer dike facing the sea is envisaged with few locks fitted with twin gates for access to the open sea. The top surface of the inner dike would serve as access to the mainland from the mega harbor with rail and road links. The coastal reservoir whose full reservoir water level (FRL) is at 0.0 m msl, would also reduce drastically the cyclone damage and flooding in coastal areas of West Godavari, Krishna, Guntur and Prakasam districts. It would also greatly improve the irrigated coastal land drainage in these districts. The coastal reservoir area can also be used for locating floating solar power plants to generate the needed water pumping power. The dikes are built by dredging sand and clay from the nearby shallow sea bed to reduce the construction cost. Nearly 1850 tmcft of water of Godavari and Krishna flood waters can be utilized for irrigation, etc. requirements with this freshwater coastal reservoir.

Vast lands in the districts of Prakasam, Nellore, Cudapah, Ananthapur and Chittoor are drought prone and do not have adequate water sources for irrigating the dry lands to the extent of 10,000,000 acres. Water from this coastal reservoir would be pumped uplands to Ramathirtham water tank (near 15°37′37″N 79°48′47″E) which is at 85 m msl. From this water tank, dry lands in Prakasam and Nellore districts up to Tamil Nadu border can be brought under irrigation by gravity canals. From this canal, water would be further pumped to the uplands up to 600 m msl across the Seshachalam mountains to irrigate vast area in Chittoor, Cudapah and Ananthapur districts. This gravity canal would also be extended further to transfer 350 tmcft water up to the Kavery river in Tamil Nadu state during South-west monsoon period. The total cost to Andhra Pradesh state would be less than ₹1,00,000 crores which is nearly ₹1,00,000 per acre of newly irrigated lands.

== Controversies and disputes ==
=== Displacement and environmental concerns ===
The proposed project would displace 276 villages and 44,574 families spread across Andhra Pradesh state mainly. Tribals constitute 50% of such a displaced population. Human rights activists came out against the project because of these reasons. In addition, one activist pointed out that this interlinking of the rivers will harm the interests of the region in the state. Environmental activist Medha Patkar said that the project not only will displace several thousands of families, it will also submerge several archaeological sites, coal deposits, a wildlife sanctuary in Papikonda National Park, and several hectares of farm land. 10,000 year old Megalithic period burial sites unearthered by AP state archeology officials in 2016 and 12th century temples would also be submerged.

Sixty-four years after the initial conception of the project, the Government of Andhra Pradesh secured the environmental clearance from the central agency in 2005. This clearance was obtained after the state government prepared a ₹4,500 crore forest management plan and rehabilitation and resettlement proposal covering 59,756 hectares that were being lost under the project. In addition, ₹40,000 was to be allotted for each dwelling to be constructed for the displaced as against ₹25,000 provided by other states. Despite this clearance, the project faced political roadblocks. The Communist Party of India (M) and Bharat Rashtra Samithi were troubled with the issue of submerging agricultural lands by the project. Meanwhile, work on the project began in April 2006 and was expected to be completed by February 2007. After 30% work of excavation work on the canals and 15% of the spillway works had been completed, the work was halted in May 2006 to seek clearance from the Ministry of Forests and Environment.

=== Interstate water sharing ===
As per the inter state agreements dated 4 August 1978 (page 89) and 29 January 1979 (page 101) with Andhra Pradesh, the states of Karnataka and Maharashtra are entitled to use 21 tmcft and 14 tmcft respectively out of the unallocated waters of Krishna river when Godavari water transferred in a year by Polavaram right bank canal from Polavaram reservoir to Prakasam barrage across Krishna river does not exceed 80 tmcft at 75% dependability. When additional Godavari water exceeding 80 tmcft is transferred from Polavaram reservoir, Karnataka and Maharashtra are entitled to additional water from the unallocated Krishna river waters in the same proportion (i.e. 21:14:45), provided all the following conditions are satisfied.

- The additional Godavari water from Polavaram project should be transferred to the Krishna river upstream of Prakasam barrage. Such additional Godavari water to be shared is decided based on 75% dependability.
- The transferred water shall also displace the water discharges from Nagarjuna Sagar Dam for the Krishna delta requirements. Krishna delta is the area located down stream of Prakasam barrage which is part of Krishna basin. It does not include adjacent coastal river basins, which are being irrigated by the Krishna waters from the Prakasam barrage.

Thus Andhra Pradesh is entitled to transfer Godavari water in excess of 80 tmcft in three out of four years (below 75% dependability) reducing the water releases from Nagarjunasagar dam for Krishna delta requirements and need not share water with other states beyond 80 tmcft. The above interstate water sharing agreement does not cover the Godavari water transferred to Krishna river which is not displacing the water releases from the Nagarjunasagar dam for the requirements of Krishna delta. Thus Andhra Pradesh need not share with other states the water transferred via Krishna river or any reservoir located on Krishna river for the water needs of any of its area (including Krishna basin) other than Krishna delta.

=== Interstate river water disputes ===
The neighbouring state of Odisha also expressed its concern on the submerging of its land and decided to study this together with the officials from Andhra Pradesh. In response, Chief Minister of Andhra Pradesh Late Y. S. Rajasekhara Reddy clarified that neither Odisha nor Chhattisgarh would be affected by the construction. The problem continued until 2010, when Chief Minister of Odisha Naveen Patnaik remained steadfast in his demand for compensation and rehabilitation of tribals of his state who would be displaced due to the submerging of their land.

Odisha and Chhattisgarh have filed a petition in the Supreme Court against the Project which has probability of temporarily submerging large areas of its state and allege that union government are going ahead with the project without the necessary permissions from Environment Ministry. Under section 90 of the Andhra Pradesh Reorganisation Act, 2014, union government has taken the responsibility of taking all clearances and approvals for the project execution and also declared the project as national project. The states also allege that public hearing in the effected areas are not held. Under section 90 (3) of the Andhra Pradesh Reorganisation Act, 2014, Telangana state has already given the approval in all respects to the Polavaram project.

Odisha, Chhattisgarh and Andhra Pradesh entered into an agreement (clause vi of final order, page 80 of original GWDT) which was made part of Godavari Water Disputes Tribunal (GWDT) award. The agreement allows Andhra Pradesh to construct the Polavaram reservoir with full reservoir level (FRL) at 150 feet above the mean sea level (MSL). Odisha approached Supreme Court against the design discharge capacity of the Polavaram dam spillway stating that it should be designed for five million cusecs (cubic feet per second) which is the estimated probable maximum flood (PMF) once in 1000 years duration. Odisha argues that otherwise there would be additional submergence above 150 ft MSL in its territory during peak floods. The recorded maximum flood is 3.0 million cusecs in the year 1986 during the last 115 years. The projected back water level build-up at Konta due to PMF in Godavari river after construction of the Polavaram project with the designed maximum water level (measured at dam point) shall be cross-checked with the level that can occur at Konta in Sabari basin from the PMF generated in the upstream of Konta when the downstream main Godavari is not under spate. Then only enhanced submergence during the PMF of the Godavari river in Odisha and Chhattisgarh states can be assessed due to the Polavaram dam construction.

The location of Polavaram dam is in the plain area at approximately 10 km downstream from the 50 km long narrow gorge in the Papi Hills. It is also to be ascertained whether the higher backwater level during the PMF in Godavari river is solely due to the presence of long narrow gorge which is acting as a natural dam/barrier or further enhanced by the presence of the downstream Polavaram barrage.

It is purely an academic interest showing concern for the few thousand hectares of farm/forest land submerged by the backwater level build-up once in five hundred or thousand years (against the permitted norm of once in 25 years) without showing concern for the thousands of square kilometers land submerged in the area downstream of the dam with a river flood of magnitude five million cusecs. Thirty-two years have passed after the GWDT award in 1980, Maharashtra, Odisha and Chhattisgarh have not made serious efforts to harness the major Godavari tributaries such as Sabari River, Indravati River and Pranahita River to utilize the allocated share of Godavari waters. This underutilization of water is the main reason for the very high flood flows at the Polavaram dam site. The vast area in excess of 10,000 square km up to sea are frequently flooded (at least once in a decade) by Godavari floods in Andhra Pradesh by the flood waters originating in Madhya Pradesh, Maharashtra, Odisha and Chhattisgarh states. The land submergence due to the Polavaram dam in Odisha and Chhattisgarh states is a fraction of the Andhra Pradesh area which is affected by the floods in the Godavari River. During the years from 1953 to 2011, Andhra Pradesh suffered nearly ₹55,800 crore which is 26% of total flood damage in India. It is justified to raise the FRL of Polavaram dam further on this ground alone. One single criterion shall be applied by the tribunals/courts for all the submerged lands whether they are related to reservoir projects construction or due to river floods (i.e. non-utilization of river water). Upstream states shall not take granted that downstream state areas are permitted to be flooded /inundated by the river flood water without offering agreeable relief/comforts.

Odisha and Chhattisgarh entered into an agreement (clause 3e, Annexure F, Page 159 of original GWDT) to construct a Hydro electricity project at Konta / Motu just upstream of the confluence point of Sileru tributary with Sabari River (tri-junction point of Andhra Pradesh, Odisha and Chhattisgarh borders). When this project is constructed, the land submergence would be more than that of Polavaram backwaters. It would be better for Odisha and Chhattisgarh to enter into an agreement with Andhra Pradesh to shift the location of this Hydro electricity project further downstream in Andhra Pradesh territory to harness Sileru river water also for hydroelectricity generation. This joint project of the three states would eliminate the backwaters issue of the Polavaram dam.

The 200 km long stretch of the Sabari river forming boundary between Chhattisgarh and Odisha drops by 2.25 meters per km length on average. This stretch of the river has substantial hydroelectricity generation potential by building medium head (< 20 m) barrages in series to minimize land submergence. The surplus water of Indravati River in Odisha can also be diverted to Sabari river via Jouranala through which Indravati River flood waters naturally overflow into Sabari basin for power generation.

In July 2018, a two-member bench of the Supreme Court asked Andhra Pradesh, Telangana, Odisha and Chhattisgarh governments to frame the issues for arguments. Telangana said to the court it is in-principle agree for the project but the center should take up study by neutral central institute like CWPRS, Pune to study the impact of Backwater due to increase of 36 lakh cusecs to 50 lakh cusecs of spillway design discharge, it is to ascertain the safety of important temple town like Bhadrachalam, Mining areas and heavy water Plant. Odisha also insisted on backwater studies. The matter is before Supreme court. Proceedings are going on. Supreme Court identified 13 issues to settle the dispute. In June 2018, it was reported that Naveen Patnaik, Chief Minister of Odisha had written to the Central Government to halt the Polavaram Project.

== See also ==
- Musunuri Nayaks
- Polavaram, Eluru district
- Interstate River Water Disputes Act
- Water security
- Steel dam
- Sriram Sagar Project
- Nizam Sagar
- Icchampally Project
- Balimela Reservoir
- Jalaput Dam
- Palar River
- Nagavali River
- Vamsadhara River
