= Freshwater ecology of Maharashtra =

River ecology of Indian state

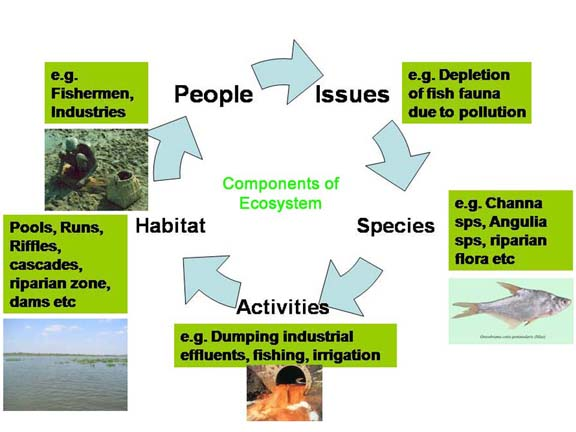
Components of the Maharashtra freshwater ecosystem

The state of Maharashtra in India has several major river systems including those of the Narmada, Tapti, Godavari and Krishna rivers. The ecology of these rivers and associated wetlands is covered in this article.

== Introduction ==
Ecology is the science of interrelationship. Various components of the ecosystem interact together and thus maintain the proper ecosystem functioning. To create the holistic picture of the any given area one should have to consider various components of the ecosystem. These components could be Habitats (Land and Waterscapes), Species, people/institutions, people's various practices, their various aspirations and issues ecological history etc. Here an attempt has been made to create a rather holistic picture of the fresh water ecological scenario of Maharashtra state. Maharashtra is well known for its varied biodiversity, habitat diversity, people and culture etc. In this page we are trying to put all available information regarding fresh water ecology of the Maharashtra region. The political boundary of Maharashtra is chosen only to facilitate the systematic data compilation. More specifically in terms of river basins, Narmada, Tapti, Godavari and Krishna basins are the premises of the information.

== Landscape ecology ==
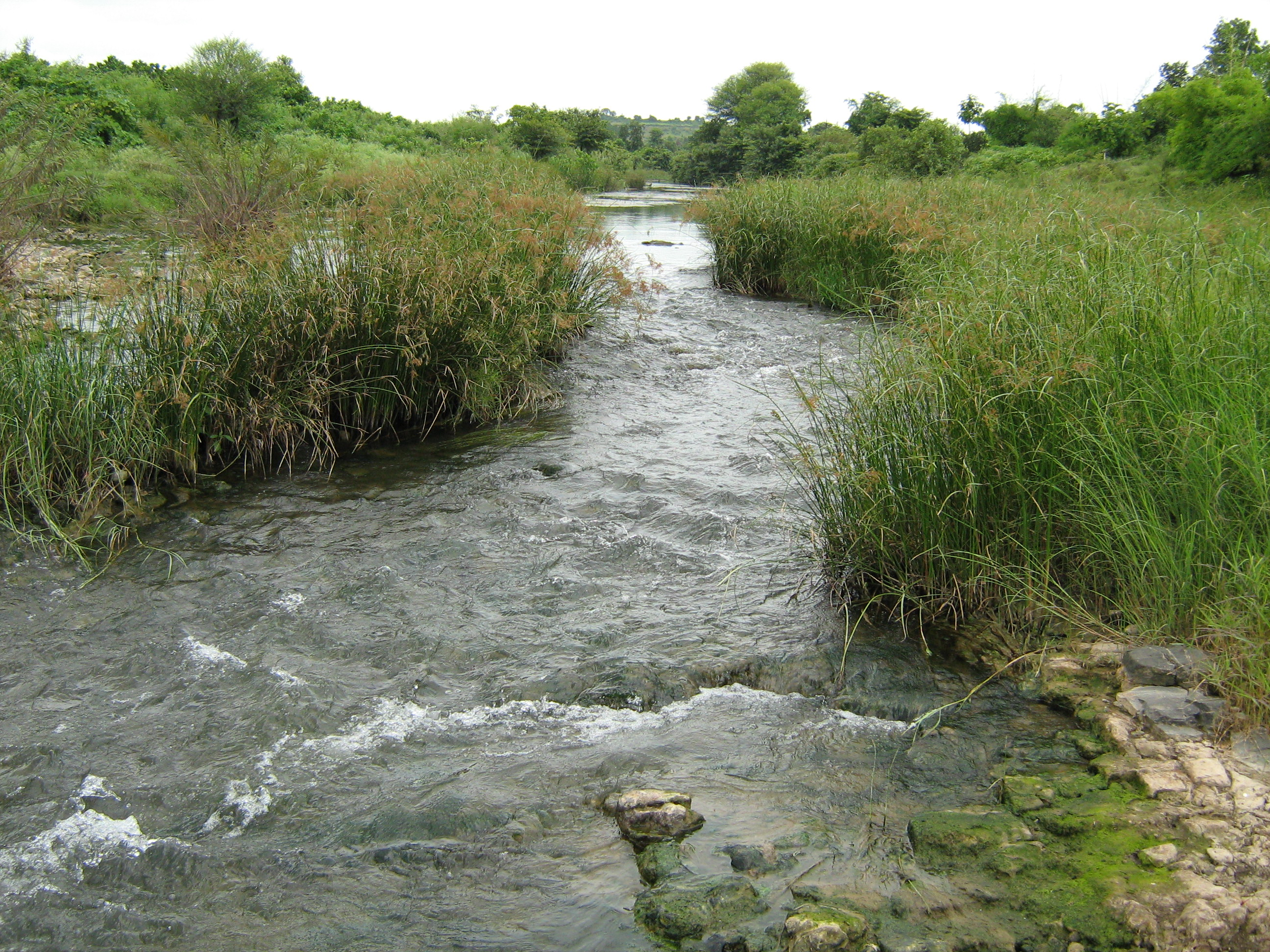
Adan river from the north Eastern Godavari basin

Habitats play an important role in shaping the biotic communities. The major reason behind the extinction of the flora and fauna is habitat loss, Habitat fragmentation and destruction. Landscape ecology is a sub-discipline of ecology and geography that address how spatial variation in the landscape affects ecological processes such as the distribution and flow of energy, materials and individuals in the environment (which, in turn, may influence the distribution of landscape "elements" themselves such as hedgerows). Landscape ecology typically deals with problems in an applied and holistic context.

=== Geography of Maharashtra ===
Located in the north center of Peninsular India, with a command of the Arabian Sea through its port of Mumbai, Maharashtra has a remarkable physical homogeneity, enforced by its underlying geology. The dominant physical trait of the state is its plateau character. Maharashtra is a plateau of plateaux, its western upturned rims rising to form the Sahyadri Range and its slopes gently descending towards the east and southeast. The major rivers and their master tributaries have carved the plateaux into alternating broad-river valleys and intervening higher lever interfluves, such as the Ahmednagar, Buldana, and Yavatmal plateau.

The Sahyadri Range is the physical backbone of Maharashtra. Rising on an average to an elevation of 1000 m, it falls in steep cliffs, to the Konkan on the west. Eastwards, the hill country falls in steps through a transitional area known as Malwa to the plateau level. The series of crowning plateaux on the crest forms a distinctive feature of the Sahyadri Range.

The Konkan, lying between the Arabian Sea and the Sahyadri Range is narrow coastal lowland, barely 50 km wide. Though mostly below 200 m, it is far from being a plain country. Highly dissected and broken, the Konkan alternates between narrow, steep-sided valleys and low laterite plateaux.

The Satpuras, hills along the northern border, and the Bhamragad-Chiroli-Gaikhuri Ranges on the eastern border form physical barriers preventing easy movement, but also serve as natural limits to the state.

== Waterscape of Maharashtra ==
=== River basins of Maharashtra ===
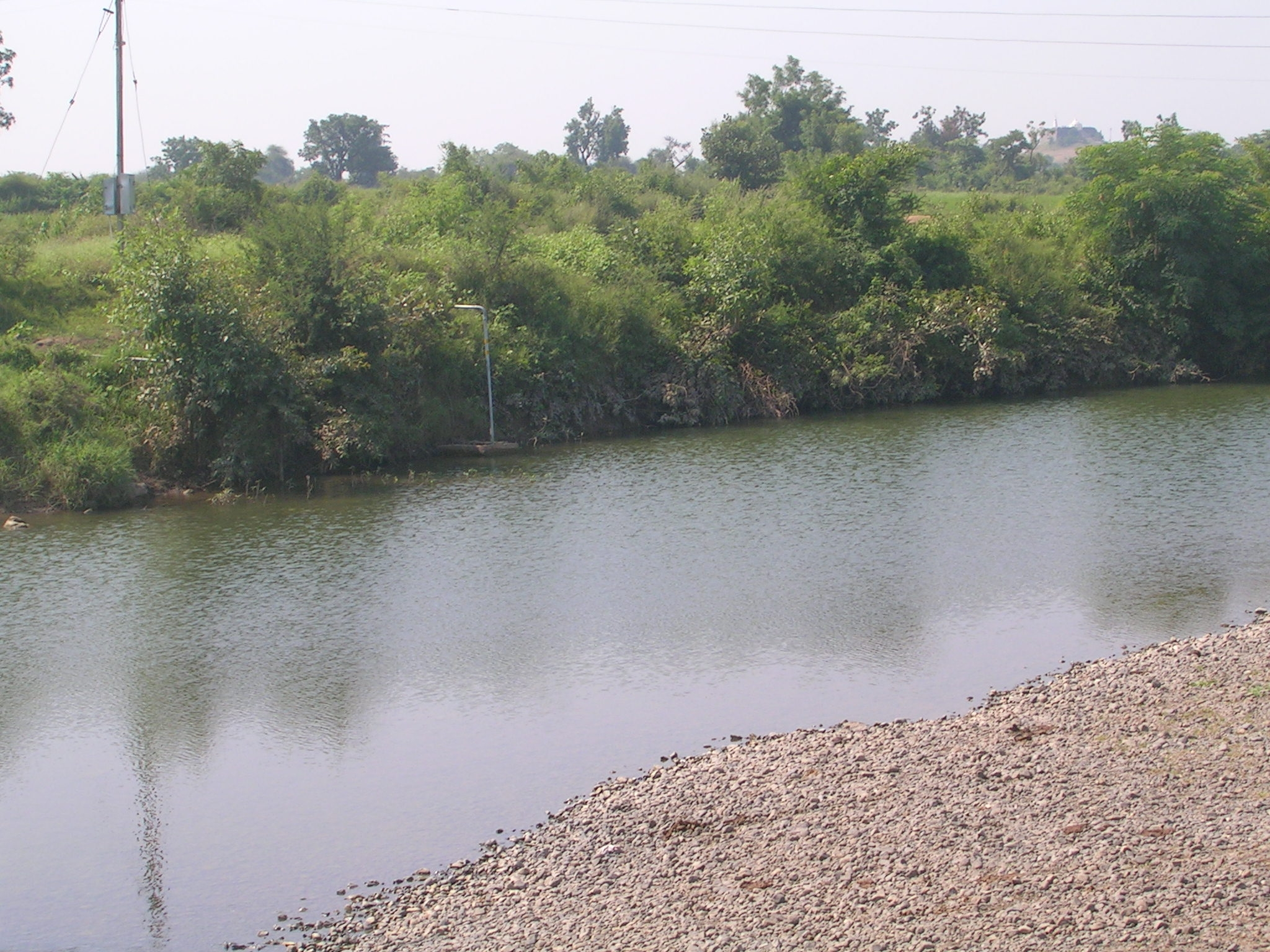
Adan River

There are 4 principal rivers of this region, 2 of which runs towards west and 2 towards the east coast. Narmada, Tapti, Godavari and Krishna drain this region. All the rivers are monsoonal rivers. Brief description of these 4 basins is given here, link given to river names will provide detailed information about the same.

==== Narmada River basin ====
Map of the major rivers, lakes and reservoirs in India

The Narmada is a river in central India in Indian subcontinent. It forms the traditional boundary between North India and South India, and is a total of 1,289 km (801 mi) long. It is one of only three major rivers in peninsular India that run from east to west, along with the Tapti and the Mahi River. It is the only river in India that flows in a rift valley. It rises on the summit of Amarkantak Hill in Madhya Pradesh state, and for the first 320 kilometres (200 mi) of its course winds among the Mandla Hills, which form the head of the Satpura Range; then at Jabalpur, passing through the 'Marble Rocks', it enters the Narmada Valley between the Vindhya and Satpura ranges, and pursues a direct westerly course to the Gulf of Cambay. It flows through the states of Madhya Pradesh, Maharashtra, and Gujarat, and empties into the Arabian Sea in the Bharuch District of Gujarat. Its longest tributary is the Tawa, which joins the Narmada at Bandra Bhan in Hoshangabad District, Madhya Pradesh. After leaving Madhya Pradesh and Maharashtra, the river widens out in the fertile district of Bharuch. Below Bharuch city it forms a 20 kilometres wide estuary where it enters the Gulf of Cambay. The Narmada river is not only used for irrigation, but for navigation. In the rainy season boats of considerable size sail about 100 kilometres above Bharuch city. Seagoing vessels of about 70 tons frequent the port of Bharuch, but they are entirely dependent on the tide.

==== Tapti River basin ====
The Tapti River (also Tapi River) is a river in central India. It is one of the major rivers of peninsular India with a length of around 724 km. It is one of only three rivers – the others being the Narmada River and the Mahi River that runs from east to west The river rises in the Eastern Satpura Range of Southern Madhya Pradesh state, and flows westward, draining Madhya Pradesh's Nimar region, Maharashtra's Kandesh and east Vidarbha regions in the northwest corner of the Deccan Plateau and South Gujarat before emptying into the Gulf of Cambay of the Arabian Sea, in the State of Gujarat. The Western Ghats or Sahyadri range starts south of the Tapti River near the border of Gujarat and Maharashtra. State Catchment area Percentage Madhya Pradesh 9804 15.1 Maharashtra 51100 78.8 Gujarat 3970 6.1 Grand Total 64874 100

==== Godavari River basin ====
The Godavari (गोदावरी नदी) River is a major waterway in central India, originating in the Western Ghats and flowing eastwardly across the Deccan Plateau between the states of Maharashtra and Andhra Pradesh, then crossing the latter state and turning to flow in a southeast direction until it empties into the Bay of Bengal through two mouths. Its tributaries include Indravati River, Manjira River, Bindusara River, Sabari River etc. Although the river arises only 80 kilometres from the Arabian Sea, it flows 1,465 km to empty into the Bay of Bengal. Just above Rajahmundry there is a dam that provides water for irrigation. Below Rajahmundry, the river divides into two streams that widen into a large river delta which has an extensive navigable irrigation-canal system, Dowleswaram Barrage that links the region to the Krishna River delta to the southwest. The Indrawati, the Wainganga, the Wardha, the Pench, the Kanhan and Penganga rivers, discharge an enormous volume of water into the Godavari system. The Godavari River has a drainage area of 313,000 km^{2} in seven states- Maharashtra, Andhra Pradesh, Karnataka, Madhya Pradesh, Chhattisgarh and Orissa.

State	Area (km^{2})	Percentage
Maharashtra	152,199	48.65%
Andhra Pradesh	73,201	23.40%
Chhattisgarh	39,087	12.49%
Madhya Pradesh	26,168	8.63%
Orissa	17,752	5.67%
Karnataka	4,405	1.41%

==== Krishna River basin ====
Krishna Basin extends over an area of 258,948 km^{2} which is nearly 8% of total geographical area of the country. The basin lies in the states of Karnataka (113,271 km^{2}), Andhra Pradesh (76,252 km^{2}) and Maharashtra (69,425 km^{2}). Krishna River rises in the Western Ghats at an elevation of about 1337 m just north of Mahabaleshwar, about 64 km from the Arabian Sea and flows for about 1400 km and outfalls into the Bay of Bengal. The principal tributaries joining Krishna are the Ghataprabha, the Malaprabha, the Bhima, the Tungabhadra and the Musi. Most part of this basin comprises rolling and undulating country except the western border which is formed by an unbroken line of ranges of the Western Ghats. The important soil types found in the basin are black soils, red soils, laterite and lateritic soils, alluvium, mixed soils, red and black soils and saline and alkaline soils. An average annual surface water potential of 78.1 km^{3} has been assessed in this basin. Out of this, 58.0 km^{3} is utilisable water. Culturable area in the basin is about 203,000 km^{2}, which is 10.4% of the total culturable area of the country. Most important tributary of Krishna are Tungabhadra River, which is itself formed by the Tunga River and Bhadra River that originate in the Western Ghats. Other tributaries include the Koyna River, Bhima River (and its tributaries such as the Kundali River feeding into the Upper Bhima River Basin), Malaprabha River, Ghataprabha River, Yerla River, Warna River, Dindi River, Musi River and Dudhganga River. Two big dams have been constructed on the river, one at Srisailam called Srisailam Dam and the other at Nagarjuna Hill. The latter, the Nagarjuna Sagar Dam, is considered to be the largest earth dam in the world with a natural reservoir

== Species diversity ==
=== Fresh water fishes of Maharashtra ===
6 Orders, 25 families and 160 species of freshwater fish have been described in Maharashtra.

== People / institutions ==
=== Fishing communities in Maharashtra ===
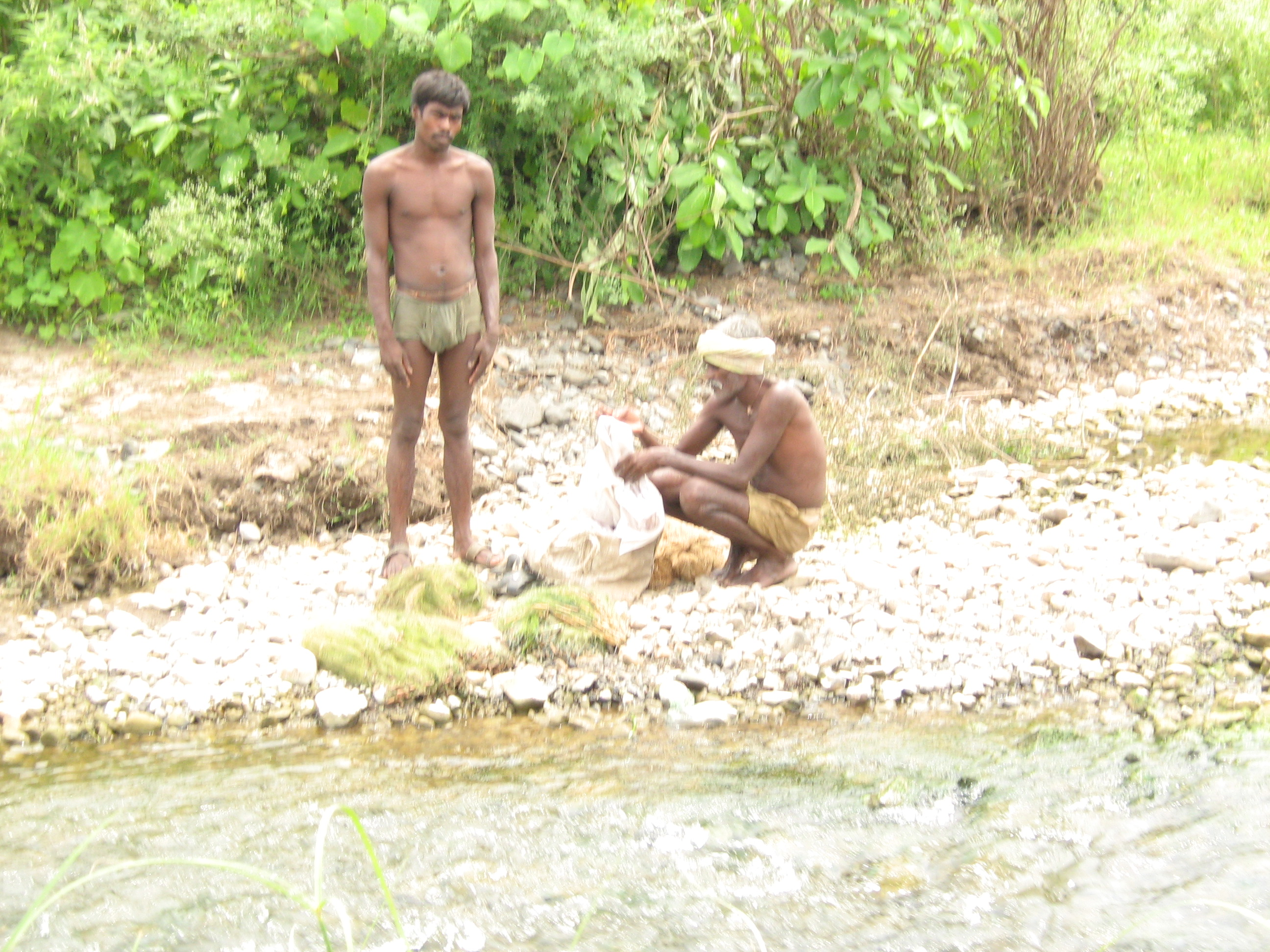
Bhoi people of Maharashtra

Maharashtra is famous for its varied fresh water resources, including lakes, tanks and rivers. A number of fishing communities have developed in response to these favourable factors. These communities can be divided into:

- Specialists or indigenous groups who depend completely on fish and other aquatic resources for their subsistence
- Subsistence fishers or opportunists who depend partly on fish, and
- Groups who have recently started fishing.

=== Traditional knowledge about natural history of fishes ===
Humans may have discovered complex, symbolic language in its present form about 60 thousand years ago, thereby initiating the development of knowledge in the modern mode. At these early stages, until the beginning of agriculture and village society some ten thousand years ago, human population were organised into largely autonomous-endogamous tribes of perhaps 2 to 10 thousand people each. There would be considerable social inter course within a tribe, but little across tribes, who would often speak mutually incomprehensible languages. There would then be common pools of knowledge limited to individual tribes; pools of different tribes may greatly diverge with little in common. However, even within tribes there may be people, such as Shamans especially concerned with development and systematic management of knowledge, in charge of pools of specialised knowledge such as that of movements of celestial bodies or March of seasons, or of herbal remedies (Gadgil 2001b). With the beginning of agriculture and animal husbandry, human societies changed radically, with a breakdown of boundaries between erstwhile endogamous tribal groups. Due to this, there may occurs amalgamation of the many streams of the knowledge and there may have developed a variety of specialised groups of people concerned with management of particular stocks of knowledge, such as that dealing with fashioning of tools or use of herbal medicines. Merging of different knowledge streams and their use has led to rapid expansion of the total flow as the hunter-gatherers societies transformed into agrarian one (Gadgil 2001b). For thousands of years, aboriginal peoples around the world have used knowledge of their local environment to sustain themselves and to maintain their cultural identity. Only in the past decade, however, has this knowledge been recognised by the Western scientific community as a valuable source of ecological information. This knowledge is variously labelled as 'folk ecology', 'ethno-ecology', 'traditional environmental knowledge' or 'ecological knowledge', 'indigenous knowledge', 'customary law', and 'knowledge of the land'. Traditional environmental or ecological knowledge is probably the most common term; however, there remains no universally accepted definition of the concept. For this work, 'traditional knowledge' (TK) and some time 'folk knowledge' terms are used interchangeably. In this linked page traditional knowledge of Dhivar and Gond people of eastern Maharashtra has been described.

=== Fishing techniques ===
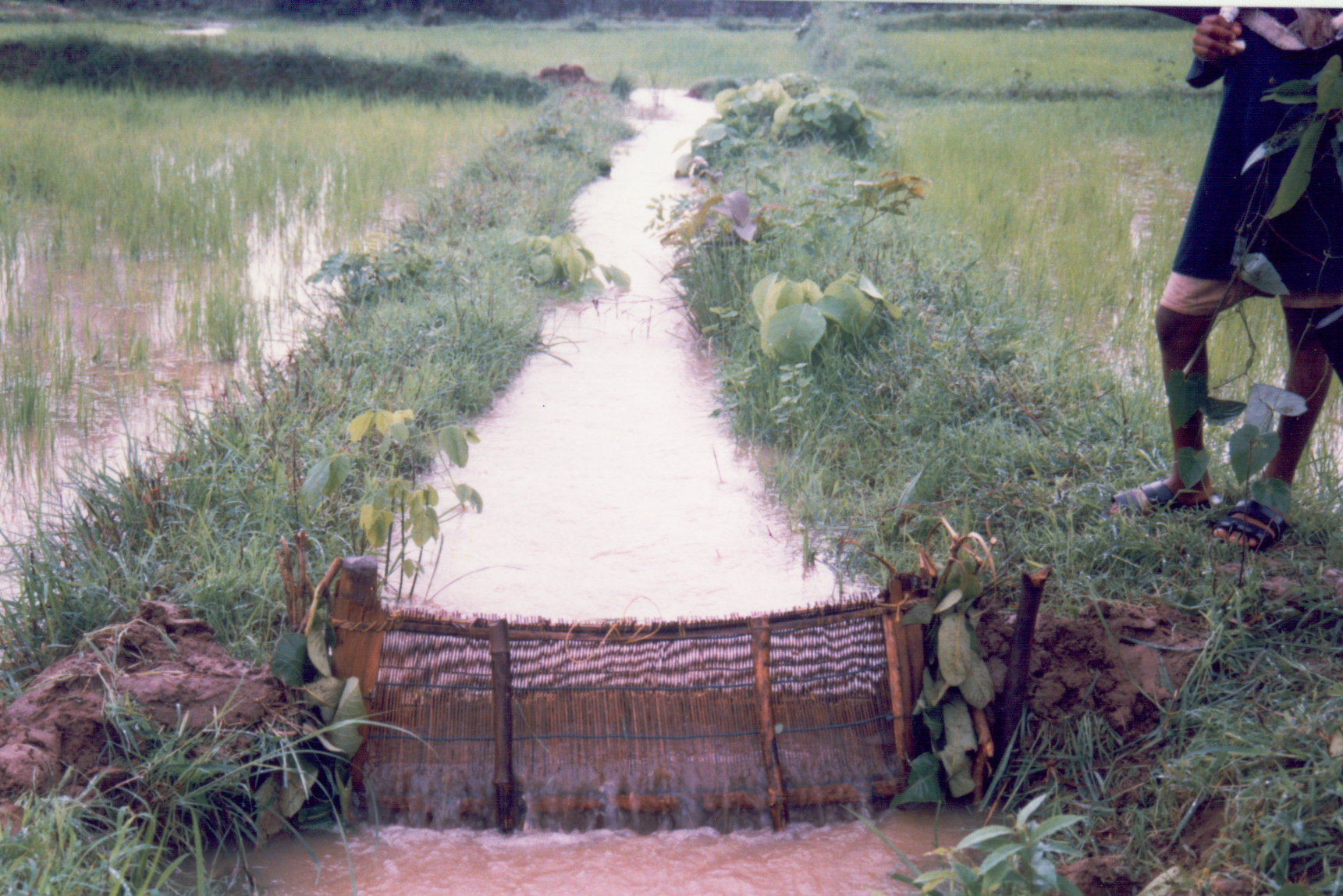
Dhir: A traditional fishing instrument used by the Gond tribal of Central India

Fishing is probably oldest and one of the important activity of humankind. Ancient remains of spears, hooks and fishnet have been found in ruins of the Stone Age. The people of the early civilisation drew pictures of nets and fishing lines in their arts (Parker 2002). Early hooks were made from the upper bills of eagles and from bones, shells, horns and thorns of plant. Spears were tipped with the same materials, or some times with flints. Lines and nets were made from leaves, plant stalk and cocoon silk. Ancient fishing nets were rough in design and material but they were amazingly, as if some now use (Parker 2002). Literature on the indigenous fishing practices is very scanty. Baines (1992) documented traditional fisheries in the Solomon Island. Use of the herbal fish poisons in catching fishes from fresh water and sea documented from New Caledonia (Dahl 1985). John (1998) documented fishing techniques and overall life style of the Mukkuvar fishing Community of Kanyakumari district of Tamil Nadu, India. Tribal people using various plants for medicinal and various purposes (Rai et al. 2000; Singh et al. 1997; Lin 2005) extends the use notion for herbal fish stupefying plants. Use of the fish poisons is very old practice in the history of human kind. In 1212 AD King Frederick II prohibited the use of certain plant piscicides, and by the fifteenth century similar laws had been decreed in other European countries as well (Wilhelm 1974). All over the globe, indigenous people use various fish poisons to kill the fishes, documented in America (Jeremy 2002) and among Tarahumara Indian (Gajdusek 1954). An ecological niche refers to the way in which a species utilises the resources of its environment and its relation to other species in the biological community. In biological community, no two coexisting species share the same niche. Similarly, no two coexisting castes have the same traditional niche in rural India; their niches are so differentiated as to preempt excessive competition for the same resources (Gadgil 2001a). The concept of the ecological niche has been used in a number of ways in anthropology: as a specialized part of human society, as synonymous with culture, and as a segment of the habitat (Donald 1972). Indian society is an agglomeration of several thousand endogamous groups or castes each with a restricted geographical range and a hereditarily determine mode of subsistence. These reproductively isolated castes may be compared to biological species, and the society thought of as a biological community with each caste having its specific ecological niche (Gadgil and Malhotra 1983).

=== Traditional conservation practices ===
India has deep-rooted tradition of nature worship, which provide base for the conservation from the grass root. However, this tradition is collapsing very rapidly. The reasons behind these are mainly, dilution of the belief systems, composite impacts of development in the form of population pressure, resource crunch, market economy, etc. In the present day context, it is important to see the present status of the 'folk conservation practices' so as to devise the strategies of its renovation.

=== Traditional knowledge about landscape ecology ===
For most of the evolutionary history, human societies have been organised in hunting-gathering tribes each with its own exclusive territory. This territoriality persisted in one form or the other with all Indian casts until recent times (Gadgil 1987). Continually searching for the food man acquires the knowledge of the different landscapes surrounding him. Gadgil (1996a) suggests 5000 Km2 resource catchment area probably required during hunting – gathering mode of life. The resource catchment should sustain a band of about 50 – 60 people by hunting the animals and collecting edible plants. In this above said area, he might have identified different patches of landscapes and waterscape elements. As languages evolved, man gave different names to different land and waterscape elements and gathered very good deal of the knowledge about the same. To preserve the ecological wellbeing of the habitat and to extend his notion of the kinship and reciprocity he attached sacred values to the habitats.

== Tools ==
=== Fish experts ===
Fish Experts of Maharashtra Fish is rather ignored taxa as compare with birds, mammals and so on. Here an attempt has been made to prepare a listing of the fish taxonomists, fish biologists, fish-culturists etc.

== See also ==
- Rivers of India
- Landforms of India
- Wetlands of India
- Ramsar sites in India
- List of fish in India
- List of fishes of Pune district
- List of fresh water fishes of Maharashtra
- भारतीय मीठे जल की मछलीया
- Geography of Maharashtra
- Ecoregions in India
- Indian subcontinent
- Maharashtra
- Geography of India
- Narmada River
- Districts of Maharashtra
- मासेमार जनजाती: महाराष्ट्र
- List of rivers of India
- Maharashtra Water Resources Department
