= Kanithi Balancing Reservoir =

Indian reservoir

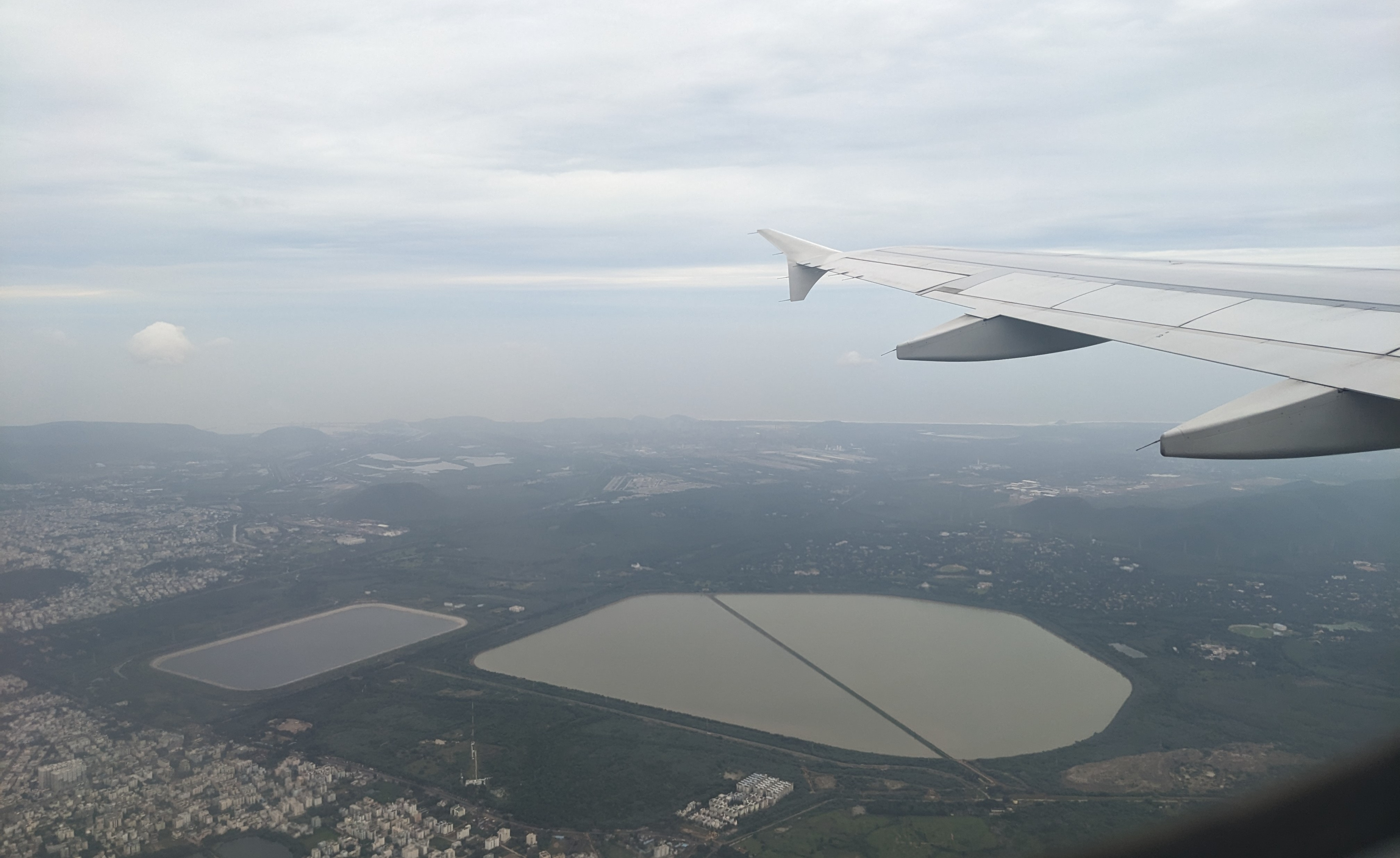

- Location within Visakhapatnam
- Location: Ukkunagaram, Visakhapatnam
- Coordinates: 17°40′11″N 83°09′23″E
- Type: reservoir
- Primary inflows: canal from River Yeleru
- Primary outflows: Borramma Gedda river
- Basin countries: India
- Max. length: 2.2 km (1.4 mi)

Kanithi Balancing Reservoir (KBR) is a reservoir in Ukkunagaram, Visakhapatnam, India. It is the water source for the entire Vizag steel plant and steel plant township.

This large mass of water reservoir is for the captive consumption of the plant and the township alike and sits between the township and the NH16. It draws its water from a special canal built exclusively for it from the Yeleru River flowing in East Godavari district. The reservoir spans 2.2 km by 2.0 km area with 0.5 Tmcft water storage capacity.

Canal from Yeleru reservoir to Kanithi Balancing reservoir

== See also ==
- Sileru River
