= Balimela reservoir boat attack =

Terrorist incident in India

- Part of Naxalite-Maoist insurgency
Date	29 June 2008
Location	Balimela reservoir, Odisha, India
Result	Naxalite-Maoist victory

Belligerents
Communist Party of India (Maoist)	India

Units involved
CPI (Maoist) cadres	Greyhounds; Local police

Strength
Unknown	60 Greyhounds; 5 police officers; 1 civilian boat operator

Casualties and losses
None	32 Greyhounds killed; 5 police killed; Boat operator killed

The Balimela reservoir boat attack occurred on 29 June 2008 when Communist Party of India (Maoist) forces ambushed a boat on the Balimela Reservoir in Odisha, India carrying 60 Greyhounds commandos, 5 police officers, and a boat operator. The boat sunk, killing 38 people, while 27 survived.

The group was ambushed by Maoists while returning to Andhra Pradesh through the Sileru River on board a motorboat belonging to the Odisha Irrigation Department, after conducting an unsuccessful combing operation in Odisha. The boat was attacked shortly after departing Janbai, Odisha by an unknown number of Maoists. The assailants, located on the surrounding hills, attacked the boat while it was passing through a narrow passage of the Balimela Reservoir with light machine guns, self-loading rifles, grenades, and automatic weapons such as AK-47s and AK-56s. The grenades thrown at the boat caused it to capsize and sink.

Thirty-eight people died in the attack, including 32 Greyhounds personnel and the boat operator, resulting in the highest death toll for the Greyhounds in a single attack. Twenty-seven people survived mostly by swimming to safety. Some Greyhounds personnel were captured by Maoists and killed in custody. Search parties later recovered the remains of Greyhounds personnel with hands bound behind their back. The Communist Party of India (Maoist) claimed responsibility for the attack. Odisha Home Secretary T.K. Mishra stated that the Greyhounds had made a "tactical blunder" by traveling in one boat and should have undertaken their journey earlier in the morning.

Patel Sudhakar Reddy, leader of the central committee of the CPI (M), who police accused of being involved in the Balimela attack and several other major crimes, was killed during a combing operation by Andhra Pradesh Police on 24 May 2009. Police had received specific intelligence regarding the location of Maoists in the Lavella forest area in Tadwai mandal of Warangal district. His colleague Venkaiah, a CPI (M) district committee member was also killed in the encounter. Muttannagari Jalandhar Reddy alias Krishna, who was also involved in the Balimela attack, surrendered to Andhra Pradesh Police in April 2021.
