= Sabari River =

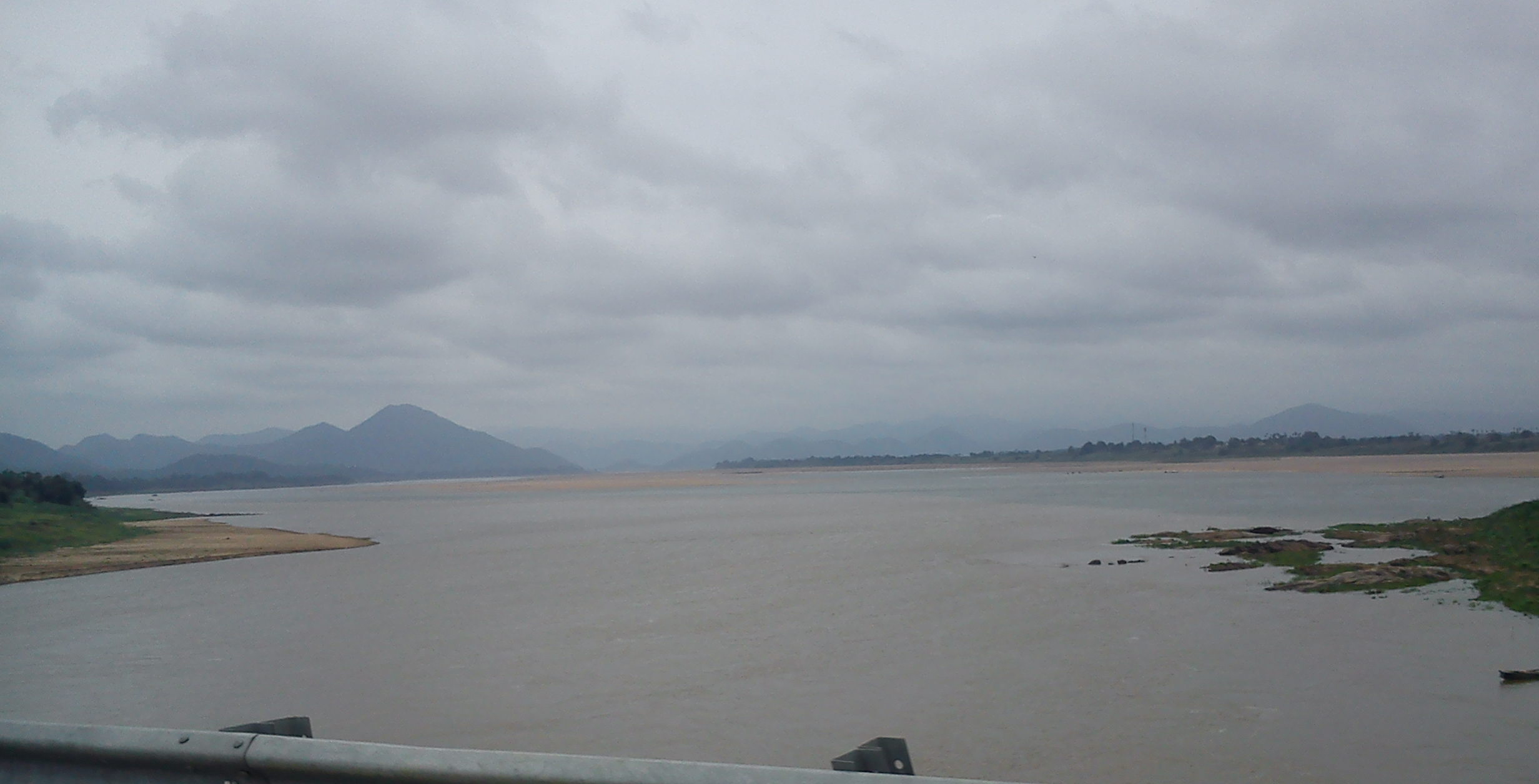
- Sabari river merging into Godavari near Kunavaram

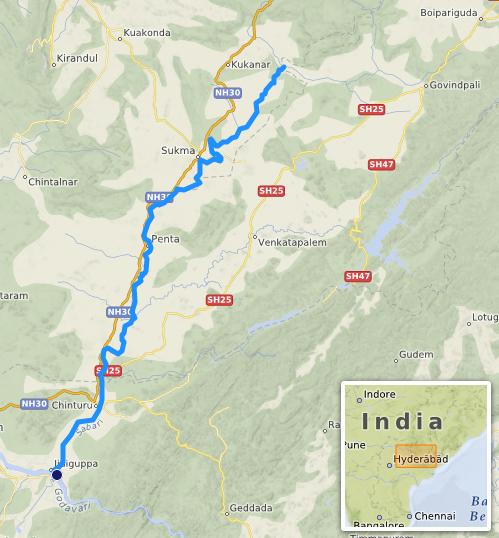
- Path of The Sabari

Location
- Country: India
- State: Odisha, Chhattisgarh, Andhra Pradesh

Physical characteristics
- Source: Sinkaram hill ranges
  - location: Odisha, India
  - coordinates: 18°N 82°E
  - elevation: 1,370 m (4,490 ft)
- Mouth: Godavari River
  - location: Kunavaram, Andhra Pradesh
  - coordinates: 17°34′13″N 81°15′37″E
  - elevation: 25.3 m (83 ft)
- Length: 418 km (260 mi)
- Basin size: 20,427 km^{2} (7,887 sq mi)

Basin features
- Tributaries
  - left: Sileru River, Pateru River

Sabari River is one of the main tributaries of the Godavari. It originates from the western slopes of Eastern Ghats in Odisha state from Sinkaram hill ranges at 1374 m MSL. It is known as Kolab River in Odisha. The Sabari river basin receives nearly 1250 mm annual average rainfall. It forms common boundary between Chhattisgarh and Odisha states. It later enters into Andhra Pradesh to merge with River Godavari. Upper Kolab project, located in Odisha across the Sabari is a major dam project supplying water for irrigation and Hydro power generation.

The 200 km long stretch of the river forming boundary between Chhattisgarh and Odisha drops by 2.25 meters per km length on average. This stretch of the river has substantial hydro electricity generation potential by building medium head (< 20 m) barrages in series to minimize land submergence. The surplus water of Indravati River in Odisha can also be diverted to Sabari river via Jaura Nallah through which Indravati flood waters naturally overflow into Sabari basin.

Sileru River (known as Machkund in its upper reaches) is the major tributary of Sabari which joins Sabari river at tri-junction boundary point of Andhra Pradesh, Chhattisgarh and Odisha. Sileru river has huge potential of hydro electricity generation which has been substantially harnessed by constructing Machkund, Balimela, upper Sileru, Donkarayi and lower Sileru hydro power projects.

== See also ==
- Polavaram Project
