= Patel Sudhakar Reddy =

Indian maoist politician

- Occupation: Maoist guerrilla
- Organization: CPI (Maoist)

Patel Sudhakar Reddy, aliases Suryam, Damodar, and Venkatesh, (1950s – 24 May 2009) was a leader of the central committee of the Communist Party of India (Maoist).

== Early life ==
Reddy was born in Kurthiravulacheruvu village in Mahbubnagar district, Andhra Pradesh (now in Telangana). Reddy joined the Radical Students Union in Gadwal area in 1981. He passed engineering with a gold medal from Osmania University. Later he joined the Communist Party of India (Marxist–Leninist) People's War which later became the Communist Party of India (Maoist).

== Politics ==
In 1983, Sudhakar Reddy moved to the Eturnagaram-Mahadevpur forest in north Telangana as commander of a guerrilla squad. Later his Party transferred him to Gadchiroli district until his arrest in 1992 in Bangalore and seven-year imprisonment. After his release in 1998 he returned to Naxalism in Dandakaranya and then Andhra Pradesh. In 2005 he was elected to his party's Central Committee as well as central military commission.

Andhra Pradesh Police accused Reddy of being involved in several major crimes including the murders of Home Minister Alimineti Madhava Reddy, Greyhounds founder K. S. Vyas, IPS officer Umesh Chandra, and the attempted murder of Chief Minister N. Chandrababu Naidu at Tirupati in 2003. He was also accused in the Balimela reservoir boat attack which killed 38 people.

== Death ==
Sudhakar Reddy was killed during a combing operation by Andhra Police in Warangal district on 24 May 2009. Another senior Maoist leader Venkataiah, a district committee member of the Warangal unit, was also killed in the encounter. Police had gone to the Lavella forest area in Tadwai mandal of Warangal district after receiving specific intelligence regarding the presence of Maoists in the area. District Superintendent of Police V.C. Sajjanar stated that the team located around 25 Maoists in Durgam Gutta in Lavella forest. Sajjanar claimed that police asked them to surrender, but they refused and fired at police. Sajjnar stated that a gunfight ensued for the next 30 minutes between police and Maoists. After the firing came to a halt, police searched the area and discovered the bodies of Reddy and Venkataiah.

The CPI (Maoist) alleged that the encounter was staged by the police and that Sudhakar Reddy was arrested near the Chhattisgarh-Maharashtra border and shot dead in Warangal.
