= Pattiseema Lift Irrigation Project =

Pattiseema Project
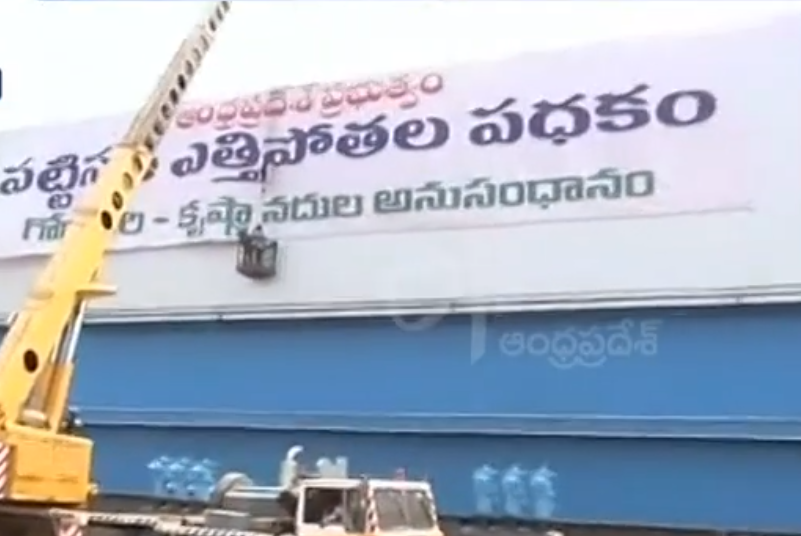

- Location within India
- Official name: Pattiseema Lift Irrigation Project
- Location: Between Godavari River and Polavaram Project
- Coordinates: 17.227745°N 81.637242°E
- Opening date: March 2016
- Construction cost: ₹1,660 crore (US$170 million)
- Owner: Government of Andhra Pradesh

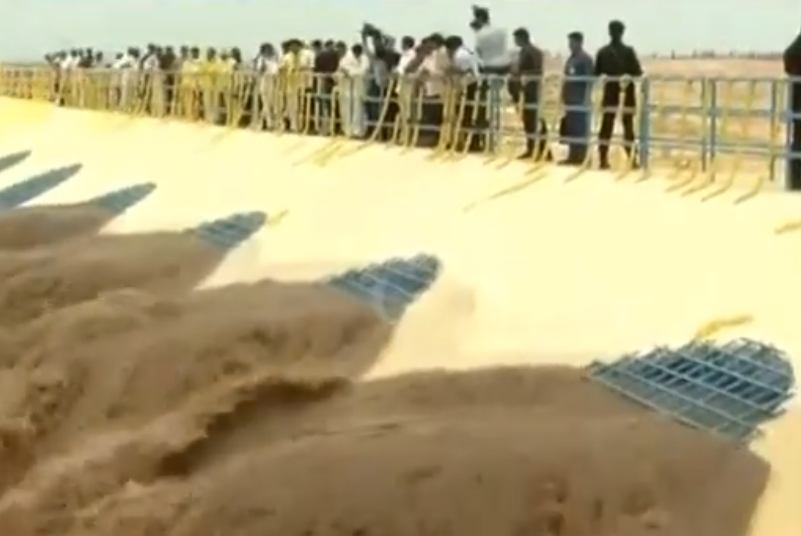
Inauguration of the Pattiseema Lift Irrigation Project

Pattiseema Lift Irrigation Project is a river interlinking project which connects Godavari River to Krishna River. This project has thereby become the first of such irrigation type projects in the country to be completed in time without any budget enhancements. It also holds a record in Limca Book of Records. The project was Inaugurated by the Chief Minister of Andhra Pradesh Nara Chandrababu Naidu in March 2016 while the project was completed in one year record of time.

== Project details ==
The project has one of the largest pump houses in Asia with 24 pumping units spread across an area of 7,476 sq m. The project has a combined capacity to discharge 240 cumecs of water. These pumps deliver water drawn from the river Godavari in Pattiseema into the Polavaram Project Right Main Canal for the benefit of farmers in the Krishna river delta. Under the Bachawat tribunal and inter-state agreement between Maharashtra, Madhya Pradesh and Andhra Pradesh, 100 tmc of water can be diverted from River Godavari to River Krishna. Pattiseema project will bring the 100 TMC water to River Krishna. This project has faced lot of hurdles in initial days as it was opposed by YSRC party citing that it had no storage component. Though there were objections from opposition parties chief Minister of Andhra Pradesh Nara Chandrababu Naidu has decided to take up this project. The bold decision taken by chief Minister Chandrababu Naidu has helped thousands of farmers cultivating 1.3 million acres in navin delta which faces water shortage in the period June to August. The water pumped into canal from River Godavari would take 7 – 8 days to reach Prakasam Barrage after travelling by Gravity for about 160 km. Polavaram project is envisaged to bring Godavari water to Krishna and the Polavaram Right canal was dug by then Chief Minister YS Rajasekhar Reddy. The Polavaram project got delayed and Chandra Babu Naidu started pattiseema and linked through Right canal to bring water to Krishna.

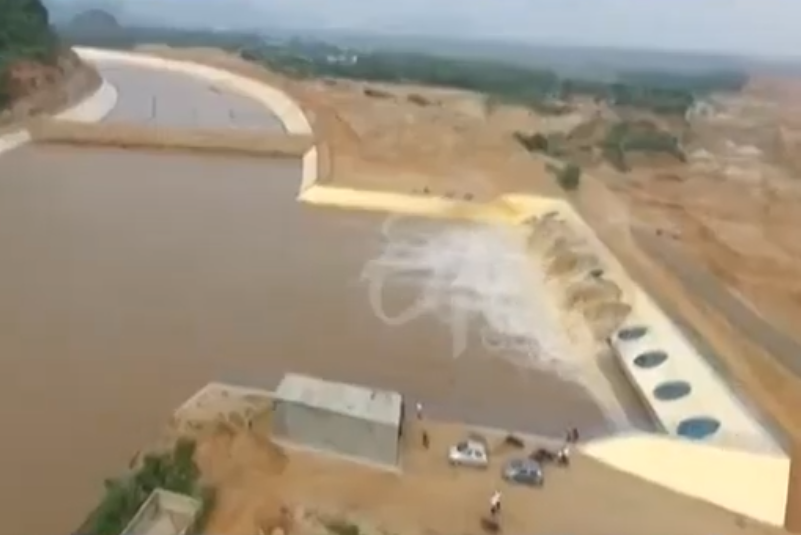
Godavari water being released into canal (drone view)

In 2015 as part of trial run it has lifted 8.8 tmc of godavari water to krishna delta which saved standing crops worth Rs2,500 crores during dry spell. During 2016-17 kharif season 56 tmc of godavari water released along with 20 tmc from Nagarjuna sagar project to meet needs of 11,35,900 acres of agriculture as well as 1,51,912 acres of aquaculture in Krishna delta.

Chief Minister Chandrababu Naidu had been showcasing PLIS as the first project interlinking two major rivers (Godavari and Krishna) in the country.

== Project utility ==
As there is no adequate water availability (three out of four years) in the Krishna River, the water supplemented, during the monsoon months in to the Prakasam Barrage pond on the Krishna River, from the Godavari River by the Pattiseema Lift would enable the saved water of the Krishna River for the irrigation and drinking water uses of the Rayalaseema region by the Pothireddypadu canal and the Handri Neeva lift from the Srisailam reservoir.

Pattiseema Lift would not become redundant even after the Polavaram Project is completed as it would be used during the dry season (December to June months) when the Polavaram right canal is unable to receive water by gravity due to fall in the Polavaram reservoir level below its full canal supply level of 41.15 metres (135 ft) MSL. The dead storage (nearly 119 tmcft below the 41.15 MSL) out of the 194 tmcft gross storage of the Polavaram reservoir would be released to the down stream Godavari river and transferred to the Prakasam barrage by the Pattiseema Lift. It would further enable supply of additional Krishna water to the Rayalaseema region by eliminating water support to the Krishna barrage throughout the monsoon year.

The power consumption is nearly 100 MW when all the pumps are put in service. The cost of power is nearly Rs one crore per day to supply 0.8 tmcft/day which is affordable in diverting the much needed Krishna water supply to the Rayalaseema region.

== See also ==
- Nagarjuna Sagar Dam
- Pulichinthala Project
- Nagarjuna Sagar tail pond
