= Sileru River =

River in India

Coordinates: 17°47′N 81°24′E

Sileru River is a left-bank tributary of Sabari River in southern India. It originates in Andhra Pradesh and flows through Odisha before merging with the Sabari. Sabari river crosses the border into Andhra Pradesh to merge with Godavari river. Sileru (known as Machkund in its upper reaches) river joins Sabari river tri-junction boundary point of Andhra Pradesh, Chhattisgarh and Odisha.

== Hydro power potential ==
Sileru river has huge potential of hydro electricity generation which has been substantially harnessed by constructing Machkund (120 MW), Balimela (510 MW), Upper Sileru (240 MW), Donkarayi (25 MW) and Lower Sileru hydro (460 MW) power projects. Chitrakonda (60 MW) hydro project located at the toe of Balimela earth dam is planned to utilise the head available across the earth dam.

== Irrigation potential ==
The water released from the Balimela power station is used for irrigation in the Potteru tributary basin of Sabari in Odisha. At present the water released from the other power stations is not useful to irrigation needs except during lean flow period in main Godavari river for the requirements of Godavari delta. Uttarandhra region can create huge irrigation potential with the perennial water supply from the available water storages in Sileru river basin. The mid lands of Alluri Sitharama Raju district can get augmented water supply by diverting Sileru river water from Donkarayi reservoir (310 m MSL) towards east of Eastern Ghats by constructing 35 km long tunnel with enhanced power potential. Similarly, mid lands of Vishakhapatnam District, Vizianagaram district and Srikakulam district can get augmented water supply by diverting Sileru river water from Guntawada weir (head works of Upper Sileru power station) at 410 m MSL towards east by constructing 30 km long tunnel with enhanced power potential. The diverted water of Sileru river to the east can also be used to supply water to the Polavaram left bank canal and Visakhapatnam city's continuous drinking water needs when water level is not adequate in Polavaram reservoir during non monsoon months.

The water released from the Lower Sileru power station can be diverted to Yeleru reservoir by gravity with a 70 km long tunnel to create additional irrigation in East Godavari district. Part of the water released by Lower Sileru power station can also be used for the planned Lower Sileru irrigation scheme located in Sileru and Sabari basins.

== See also ==
- Kanithi Balancing Reservoir
- Jalaput Dam
