= Long Term Irrigation Fund =

Fund under the National Bank for Agriculture and Rural Development

The Long Term Irrigation Fund (LTIF) is a fund under the National Bank for Agriculture and Rural Development (NABARD) for implementation of major and medium irrigation projects in India.

== Operations ==
It was announced by Union Finance Minister, Arun Jaitley during the Union Budget Speech 2016-17 with an initial corpus of Rs. 20,000 crore. In the 2017-18 budget, another Rs. 20,000 were allocated. In addition, Rs. 5,000 crore were allocated for encouraging micro irrigation.

During 2016-17, the LTIF sanctioned Rs. 49,889.60 crore and released Rs.9,086.03 crore.

In 2018, NABARD sanctioned 12,773 crore to Maharashtra for 26 projects.

The LTIF has identified 99 projects to fund in 18 states. In addition, it funds the Polavaram National Project in Andhra Pradesh and North Koel Reservoir Project in Bihar and Jharkhand.
