= Chagalnadu Lift Irrigation Scheme =

Lift irrigation project in India

Changalnadu Lift Irrigation Scheme is a lift irrigation project located in Andhra Pradesh, India.
