= Landforms of India =

The following is the list of landforms of India. There are various types of landforms in the country, such as bodies of water and also volcanoes.

== List of landforms in India ==
- List of glaciers in India
- List of volcanoes in India
- List of valleys India
- List of rivers in India
- List of lakes in India
