= Jalaput Dam =

Dam in Jalaput village, Andhra Pradesh and Odisha, India

- Location within India Location within Odisha Location within Andhra Pradesh
- Interactive map of Jalaput Dam
- Country: India
- Location: Jalaput village, Andhra Pradesh and Odisha
- Coordinates: 18.459192°N 82.548478°E
- Purpose: Hydroelectric & Irrigation
- Construction began: 1946
- Opening date: 1955
- Owners: Governments of Andhra Pradesh and Odisha

Dam and spillways
- Type of dam: Earth-fill dam
- Impounds: Machkund River
- Height: 60.65 m (199 ft) maximum.
- Length: 419 m (1,375 ft)
- Spillway type: Ogee section
- Spillway capacity: 5660 cumecs

Reservoir
- Creates: Jalaput Reservoir
- Total capacity: 971×10^{6} m^{3} (0.233 mi^{3})
- Active capacity: 893×10^{6} m^{3} (0.214 mi^{3})
- Inactive capacity: 78×10^{6} m^{3} (0.019 mi^{3})
- Catchment area: 1,963 km^{2} (758 mi^{2})
- Surface area: 97.12 km^{2} (37.50 sq mi)

Power Station
- Operator: APGENCO
- Turbines: 3 × 17, 3 × 23 MW
- Installed capacity: 120 MW
- Website irrigationap.cgg.gov.in/wrd/dashBoard

The Jalaput Dam is a hydroelectric dam built on the upper reaches of the Sileru River, which is known locally as Machkund River. The Sileru River is a tributary of the Sabari River, which in turn is a tributary of the Godavari. in India which rises in the Mudugal hills of Alluri Sitharama Raju district and near Ondra Gadda it becomes the boundary between the states of Andhra Pradesh and Odisha. This dam is the most ignored one in India, and currently it is in dilapidated condition.

== Location of the dam ==
For over 48 km the river runs nearly north along a meandering course through the Padwa Valley. About 48 km south of Jeypore, it winds westward along the edge of the plateau before abruptly turning at a short angle to the south-west down a steep descent popularly known as Duduma Falls.

== Technical specifications of the dam and options for the future ==
Jalaput, Machkund, and Onukadelli form the triangular shape of this hydroelectricity generation project. The electricity generated here is supplied to many nearby towns including Visakhapatnam, Vijaywada, both in Andhra Pradesh and, Koraput and Jeypore in Odisha.

Jalaput Dam impounds 34.273 Tmcft of water in Jalaput Reservoir for the needs of the 120 MW Machkund Hydro-Electric Scheme (MHES) downstream, which has been in operation since 1955. The dam and the MHES are the joint projects of Andhra Pradesh and Odisha states. The existing six power generation units have become old and obsolete compared to the latest technology. It is much economical to install a new hydro-electric scheme with a 15 km long tunnel using nearly 400 meters available level drop between Jalaput reservoir and the existing Balimela Reservoir backwaters. There is also the possibility to install a huge capacity Pumped-storage hydroelectricity station for the needs of peaking power using high water level drop. This reservoir will serve as the upper pond and the existing Balimela reservoir as the tail pond for installing Pumped-storage hydroelectricity units. Thus this reservoir water can be put to use more productively. The existing MHES can also be kept in operation by diverting the surplus water from the nearby upper Kolab reservoir into the Machkund river basin by joining with a nearly 4 km long tunnel. This would facilitate the use of excess water from the upper Kolab reservoir for enhanced electricity generation in MHES and downstream Balimela powerhouse by using nearly 200% more available head in Sileru river basin before putting finally for irrigation use.

== Village ==
Jalaput is a border village between Odisha and Andhra Pradesh. A bridge links the two states of Andhra Pradesh and Odisha, and the sides of it are known as LF (Andhra Pradesh, Visakhapatnam district) and RF (Odisha, Koraput district) respectively. Prior to the creation of the Jalaput Dam, it was known as Tentaput.

== Origin of the name ==
Jalaput derives its name from its local tribal dialect in which jala or jal means water (jal means water in Sanskrit as well). Put means residence or a storehouse or large place. The Jalaput water reservoir was the only water source for many of the local tribes in more than 100 tribal villages in and around Jalaput in the Koraput district in the state of Odisha. Before the present dam was built in 1955, the area was densely forested with the river surrounded by many tribal villages.

== Communication ==
Jalaput is connected by road with major municipalities in Odisha and Andhra Pradesh. It is one of the most sought after tourist destinations in winter. Araku Valley is 60 kilometres from here and Vishakhapatnam is the largest nearby major city.

== Culture and local occupations ==
Agriculture is the main occupation in nearby villages. The jalaputias (The residents of jalaput) are mainly Government employees. Retail business here is dominated by prominent Odia-speaking businessmen. Woodcutting has become a prominent business here for a decade. That gave rise to many gangs fights in the last few years. District administration is worried about the rising fights amongst different groups for the last five years. Apart from rice, java and many medicinal plants also form a significant part of agrarian business here. Presently many have entered into contractual farming for medicinal plants, jatropha plantation, and tissue culture.

The village has 5-decade old temples, Uma Maheshwara Temple, mosques, and churches within a distance of 30 meters. Residents celebrate all festivals without any religious overtones. The village is the right combination of Telugu and Odissa language people. People here understand and communicate in both languages with a mixed accent. Every year in the last week of May or the first week of June people celebrate the local Village God festival and they celebrate it grandly; The local people call it "Aadavi talli jatara ". The climate in this zone is very pleasant and a lot of attraction to viewers and mainly in the winter season the temperatures are even recorded 10 degrees below.

Many aboriginal tribes inhabit nearby small villages. Most of the region was densely covered by forest. But recently due to massive deforestation in the last one and half-decade, much of the land has become barren.

The main village area residents are Government Employees and also a businessman.

== See also ==
- Godavari Water Disputes Tribunal
