= Balimela Reservoir =

Balimela Dam
- Interactive map of Balimela Dam
- Location: Balimela
- Coordinates: 18°18′29″N 82°15′23″E
- Purpose: Irrigation, Power
- Status: Completed
- Opening date: 1977
- Owner: Odisha
- Operator: Odisha

Dam and spillways
- Type of dam: Gravity and Masonry
- Impounds: Sileru River
- Height: 70 m (230 ft) maximum.
- Length: 1,821 m (5,974 ft)
- Spillway type: Ogee section
- Spillway capacity: 10930 cumecs

Reservoir
- Creates: Balimela Reservoir
- Total capacity: 3,610×10^{6} m^{3} (0.87 mi^{3})
- Active capacity: 2,676×10^{6} m^{3} (0.642 mi^{3})
- Inactive capacity: 934×10^{6} m^{3} (0.224 mi^{3})
- Catchment area: 4,910 km^{2} (1,900 mi^{2})
- Surface area: 184.53 km^{2} (71.25 mi^{2})

Power Station
- Operator: Odisha
- Turbines: 6 × 60, 2 × 75 MW
- Installed capacity: 510 MW

The Balimela Reservoir is located in Malkangiri district, Odisha, India on the river Sileru which is a tributary of the Godavari river. The gross storage capacity of Balimela reservoir is 3610 million cubic meters.

Andhra Pradesh (AP) and Odisha states entered into agreements to construct Balimela dam as a joint project and share the Sileru river waters available equally at Balimela dam site. Odisha developed the 360 MW (6 × 60 MW units) power house by diverting the Balimela waters to the Potteru sub-river basin. A barrage at Surlikonda across the Potteru stream was constructed to redirect the discharge from Balimela Power House into two main canals for irrigation; one on the right side named Tamasha Main Canal and the second on the left side named Gompakonda Main Canal. These two canals were constructed under the Potteru Irrigation Project for irrigation in Malkangiri district, the most backward district of the state and thereby lifting the living standard of the inhabitants. Two more power generation units 75 MW each were added under stage-2 to increase the installed capacity up to 510 MW.

The share of Andhra Pradesh from the available water in the Belimela is released downstream into the river for generating hydro electricity located at Upper Sileru, Donkarai and lower Sileru Hydro power stations ultimately utilizing the water for irrigation in the Godavari delta during dry season.

== Interstate dispute ==
Odisha is not permitting AP to install hydropower units (30 MW capacity) at the toe of Balimela dam on the grounds of another jurisdiction. Though AP is permitted in the agreements, Odisha says the site of power house is located in Odisha's territory and AP cannot install the hydro power units in its land. Thus, it has not been possible to develop 30 MW power generation capacity at a very low generation cost for the last 40 years due to the dispute. The agreement also states that Kolab river surplus water available in Upper Kolab reservoir can be diverted jointly by Odisha and AP to Sileru/Machkund river basin for enhancing hydro power potential substantially. This diversion scheme has also not materialized until now.

== Tunnel gates ==
A tunnel was built for the river water diversion during the dam construction. During the year 2018, the tunnel gates were operated/opened after 45 years to facilitate repair works of the dam spill way, etc. Uncontrolled water is passing through the tunnel out of the reservoir as the dam gates are not responding to the flow regulation. It is feared that water level in the reservoir would drop below its minimum draw down level by the time tunnel gates are rectified.

== See also ==
- Balimela reservoir boat attack
- Vamsadhara River
- Nagavali River
- Jalaput Dam
