= Yeleswaram =

- Town
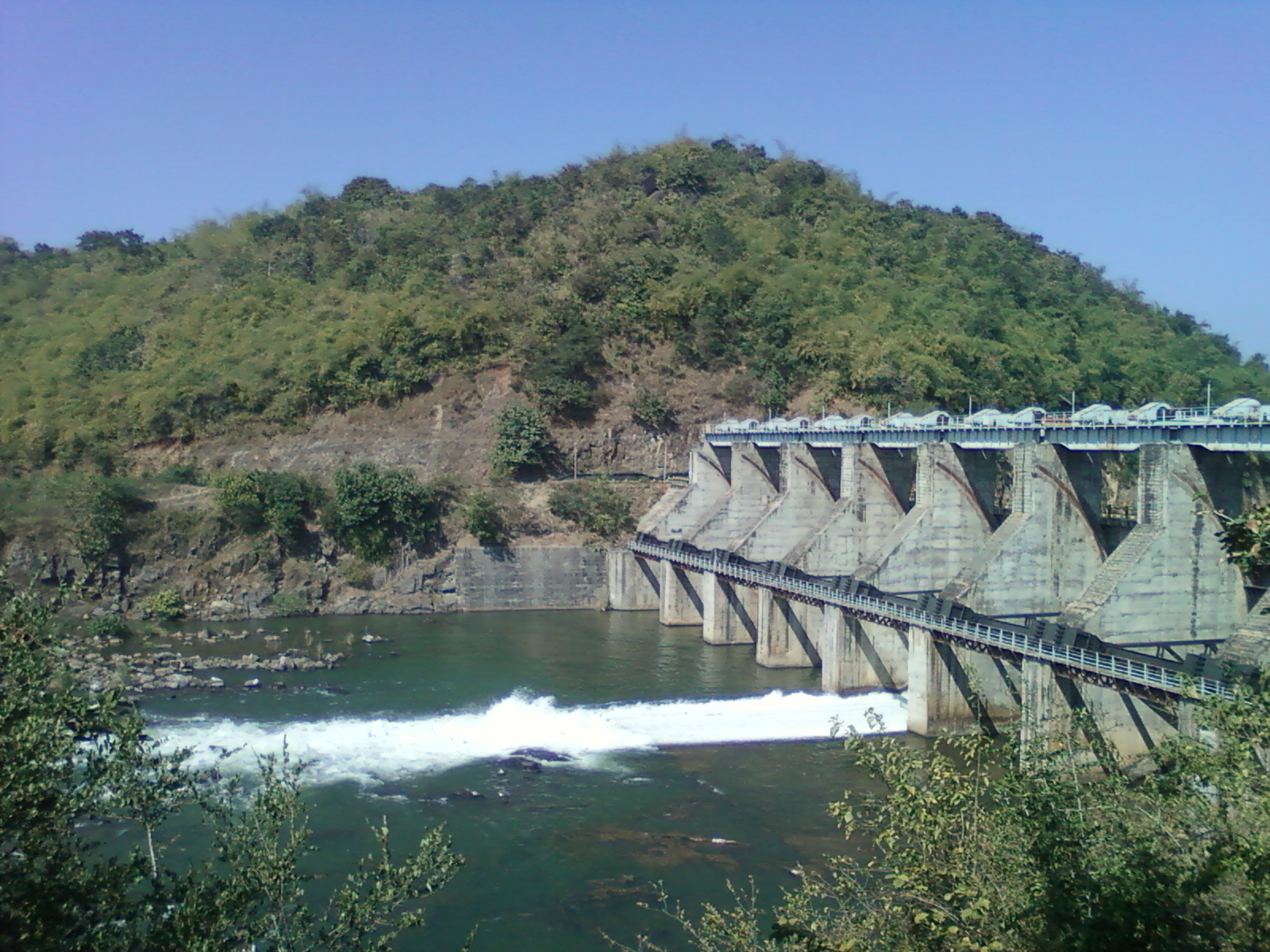
- Yeleru Dam at Yeleswaram

- Location in Andhra Pradesh, India
- Coordinates: 17.2833°N 82.1000°E
- Country: India
- State: Andhra Pradesh
- District: Kakinada district
- Talukas: Yeleswaram

Area
  - Total: 6.50 km^{2} (2.51 sq mi)
- Elevation: 60 m (200 ft)

Population (2011)
  - Total: 32,927
  - Density: 5,070/km^{2} (13,100/sq mi)

Languages
  - Official: Telugu
- Time zone: UTC+5:30 (IST)
- PIN: 533429
- Telephone code: +91-8868
- Vehicle Registration: AP05 (Former); AP39 (from 30 January 2019)

Yeleswaram or Elesvaram is a town in the Kakinada district in the state of Andhra Pradesh in India.

A freedom fighter and Indian National Congress Leader Chandaka Apparao belongs to this place.

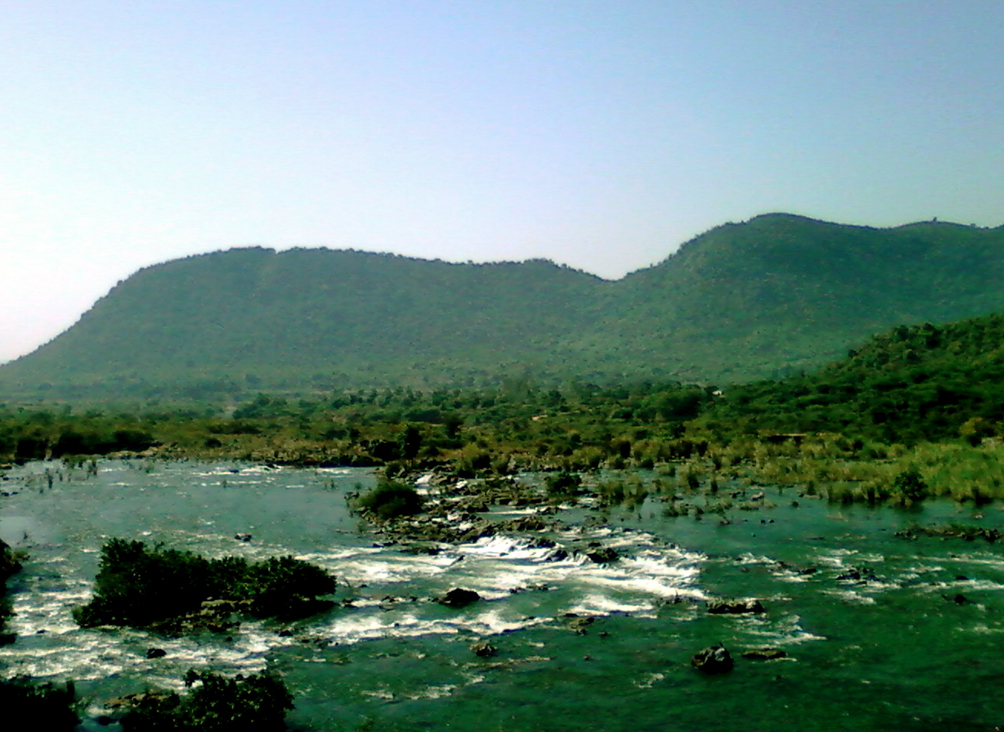
Yeleru River at Yeleswaram project site

== Geography ==
Yelesvaram is located at 17.2833°N 82.1000°E. It has an average elevation of 60 meters (200 feet).

== Transport ==
Yeleswaram is located 9km to NH 16. The major railway station to the town is Samalkot railway station. The nearest airport to Yeleswaram is Rajahmundry Airport which is 45km away.
