= Nagarjuna Nagar Halt railway station =

Railway station in Namburu, India

Nagarjuna Nagar Halt

General information
- Location: Namburu Road, Guntur, Andhra Pradesh; India
- Coordinates: 16.382837°N 80.516853°E
- System: Indian Railways station
- Owner: Government of India
- Operator: Indian Railways
- Line: Guntur–Krishna Canal section
- Platforms: 2
- Tracks: 2

Construction
- Structure type: Standard (On ground)

Other information
- Station code: NGJN
- Zone(s): South Central Railway
- Division(s): Guntur

Services
Preceding station	Indian Railways	Following station
Namburu towards ?	Guntur–Krishna Canal section	Krishna Canal Junction towards ?
Location

Nagarjuna Nagar Halt railway station is an Indian Railways station near Acharya Nagarjuna University in Andhra Pradesh. It lies on the Guntur–Krishna Canal section and is administered under Guntur railway division of South Central Railway zone.

== History ==
Between 1893 and 1896, 1,288 km (800 mi) of the East Coast State Railway, between Vijayawada and Cuttack was opened for traffic. The southern part of the West Coast State Railway (from Waltair to Vijayawada) was taken over by Madras Railway in 1901.

== Jurisdiction ==
It lies on the Howrah–Chennai main line, Delhi–Chennai line and is administered under Guntur railway division of South Central Railway zone. The station is also a part of Guntur–Krishna Canal section.

== See also ==
- List of railway stations in India
