= Vasireddy =

Vasireddy may refer to:

- Vasireddy Venkatadri Nayudu - the last king of the Vasireddy clan
- Vasireddy Seethadevi - a Telugu writer of Andhra Pradesh, India
- Vasireddy Sri Krishna - Vice Chancellor of Andhra University
- Raja of Muktyala - also known as Vasireddy Ramagopalakrishna Maheswara Prasad, member of the Vasireddy clan
- Vasireddy Venkatadri International Technological University - a private deemed university in Guntur district, Andhra Pradesh, India
