= Nagarjuna Sagar tail pond =

Reservoir in India

Nagarjuna Sagar tail pond is a multipurpose reservoir located 21 km downstream from the Nagarjuna Sagar Dam across the Krishna River near Satrasala in Palnadu district, India. Its gross water storage capacity is 6 Tmcft. The reservoir water spread area extends up to the toe of the Nagarjuna Sagar dam. The project was completed by July 2014.

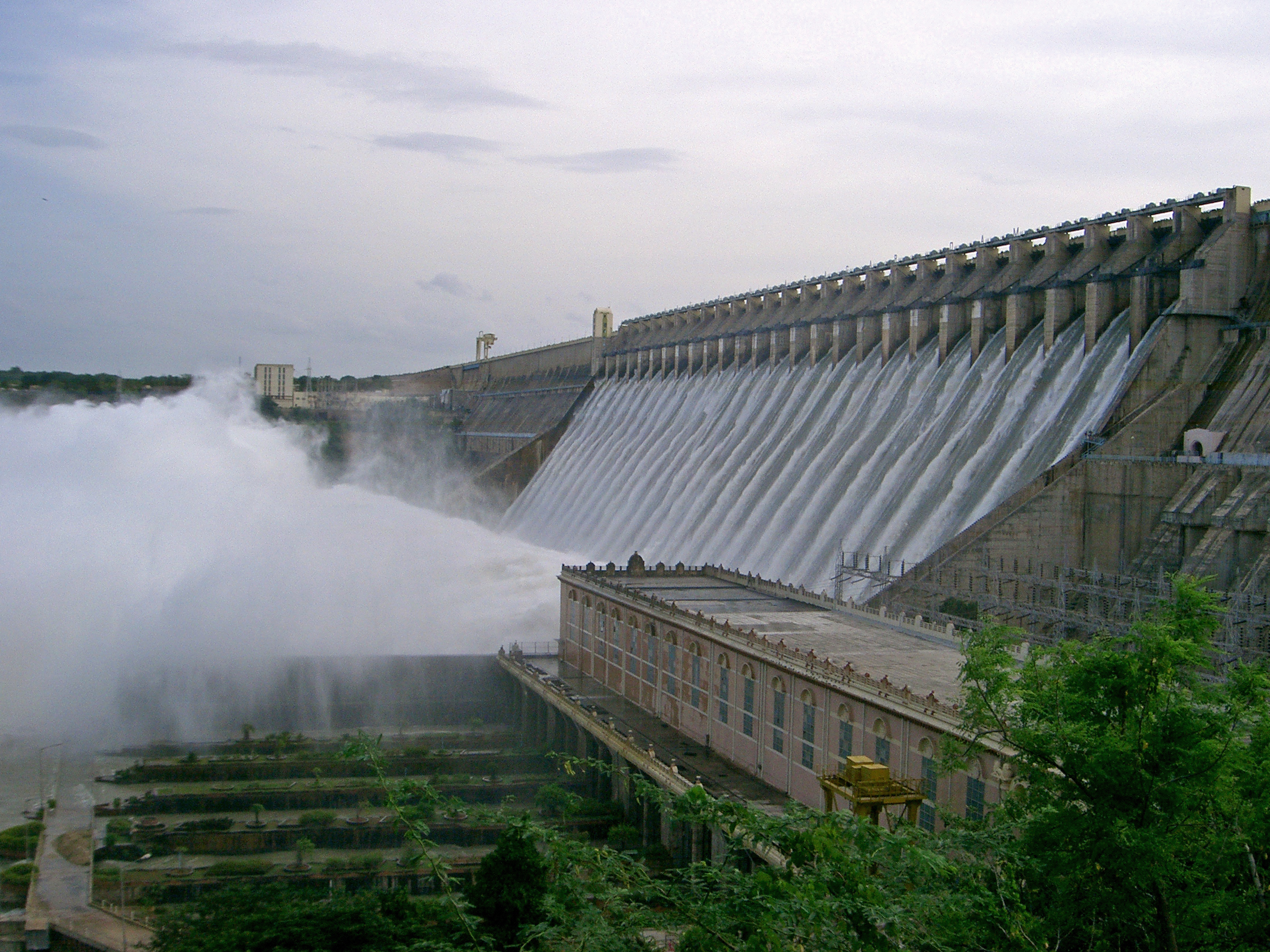
810 MW peaking power station at the toe of Nagarjuna Sagar dam

== Hydro electricity generation ==
Two units of 25 MW each hydro power generation units, were commissioned in the year 2017 by APGENCO to utilize the head available across the dam from the river flood water, and the water released to meet the Prakasam Barrage requirements.

== Peaking power generation ==
Presently, the 700 MW reversible hydro turbines (7 x 100 MW) located at the toe of Nagarjuna Sagar Dam are unable to operate in pumping mode due to non availability of tail pond for storing the released water during the power generation mode. With the completion of tail pond, surplus electricity from the electricity grid would be used for pumping the water back to the Nagarjuna Sagar reservoir and recycled for meeting peaking load on daily basis. Thus surplus electricity is consumed when it is available and used to meet the peak electricity requirements without letting the water out of the Nagarjuna Sagar tail pond. 700 MW peaking power for eight hours duration can be met from the one Tmcft of live storage water capacity available in the tail pond.

== Irrigation potential ==
200 Tmcft surplus water annually from the Godavari River is planned to be fed into this tail pond by the Dummugudem Lift Irrigation Scheme which is under execution. The water transferred to this tail pond will be pumped to the upstream 410 Tmcft gross water storage capacity Nagarjuna Sagar reservoir to feed its right and left bank canals. Thus Nagarjuna Sagar reservoir need not receive the water supply from the upstream Srisailam reservoir. As the tail water level (48.33 m MSL) of this dam is below the full reservoir level (53.34 m MSL) of the downstream Pulichintala dam, surplus water in Pulichinthala reservoir can be pumped by envisaging pumped storage units from Pulichinthala reservoir to Nagarjunasagar reservoir via this pond. The retained water in the Srisailam reservoir would be used for upstream water uses from Jurala and Srisailam reservoirs for irrigation needs in uplands of Telangana and Rayalaseema regions. The water from the Nagarjuna Sagar reservoir can also be pumped to the Srisailam reservoir by Srisailam left bank hydro electric power station (900 MW) in pumping mode in case of severe drought in Krishna river basin. Koilsagar lift irrigation project (near 16°23′49″N 77°39′30″E), Rajiv Bheema lift irrigation project, Nettampadu lift irrigation project (near 16°18′58″N 77°40′21″E), Kalwakurthy lift irrigation scheme, Srisailam Left Bank Canal, Telugu Ganga irrigation project, Handri Neeva lift irrigation project, Galeru Nagari irrigation project, Veligonda irrigation project etc. which are in advanced stage of construction, are depending on the Krishna river water available at Jurala / Srisailam dams.

A lift canal from the Krishna river (16°42′50″N 80°08′24″E at 20 m MSL) downstream of Pulichintala dam will be executed to feed Godavari water diverted from Polavaram to some of the existing command area (situated below 60 m MSL) under Nagarjuna Sagar right bank canal to facilitate extension of Nagarjuna Sagar right bank canal connecting to Kandaleru feeder canal / Somasila reservoir.

== Alternate to Dummugudem to Nagarjuna Sagar tail pond link canal ==
Dummugudem to Nagarjuna Sagar tail pond link canal is entirely located in Telangana region and needs to be routed through high lands which necessitate more pumping head. An alternative link canal to Nagarjuna Sagar tail pond from Polavaram dam is also economically feasible to transfer Godavari water. This link canal passes entirely through the coastal Andhra Pradesh region only.

== Joint projects with Karnataka ==
The Rajolibanda barrage is not receiving adequate continuous flows due to excessive water utilization in its catchment area in Karnataka. The lower Tungabhadra basin badly needs water augmentation from the adjacent Krishna river. This is achieved with a 20 km long tunnel from Narayanpur reservoir to the Maski nala reservoir / tank situated at 475 m MSL for drawing nearly 250 tmcft Krishna river water. It would also provide additional water to bring more area under irrigation in uplands of Raichur & Mahboobnagar districts. Reliable Krishna river water can be supplied instead of unreliable Tungabhadra river water to the existing Tungabhadra Left bank canal in Raichur district, existing Tungabhadra right bank low level canal, the existing Rajolibanda left bank canal and the existing 150 years old K. C. Canal. Thus substantial Tungabhadra reservoir water would be saved for utilization in upstream new projects and reliable Krishna river water supply is ensured to existing projects.

A new barrage (FRL 349 m MSL) across the Krishna river just downstream of Bhima river confluence point on the common border of Karnataka and Andhra Pradesh states (near 16°24′25″N 77°17′21″E), can also be taken up to supply Krishna river water by lift irrigation to the westernmost parts of Mahbubnagar district and high lands lying east of Bhima river in Karnataka.

Ultimately, 500 tmcft water is to be transferred annually from the Godavari river to this pond for meeting various water needs in Andhra Pradesh. Thus Nagarjuna Sagar tail pond will play pivotal role to put to use the water from the Godavari River in all regions of the Andhra Pradesh state.

== See also ==
- Sileru River § Irrigation potential
- Icchampally Project
- Dummugudem Lift Irrigation Scheme
