= Balotsav =

Annual international cultural festival in India for Telugu children

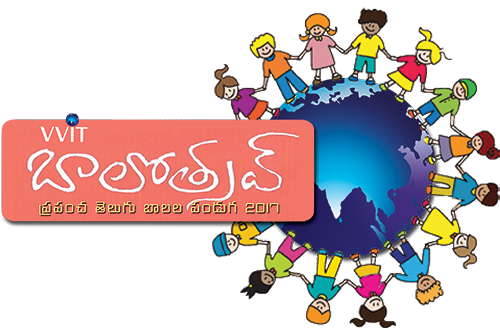
- Balotsav 2017 Logo
- Status: active
- Genre: Children's festival
- Dates: 3–4 days in the second week of November (close to Children's Day)
- Frequency: Annually
- Venue: Kothagudem (Note: 1991–2016); VVIT (Note: 2017–)
- Country: India
- Years active: 35
- Inaugurated: 1991
- Most recent: 28–30 November 2019
- Previous event: 28–30 November 2018
- Website: www.balotsav.com www.balotsav.in

Balotsav (transl. Children's festival) is an annual international cultural festival conducted in India for Telugu children. It includes competitions in various aspects such as painting, elocution and drama. It was started as a town-level event in 1991. Since then the event has gained popularity among the school children, and is now a national level event with thousands of participants from several states of India. Prior to 2017, the event was conducted in Kothagudem in the second week of November. Starting in 2017, the venue has been changed to the Vasireddy Venkatadri Institute of Technology, Guntur district, Andhra Pradesh.

== History ==
In the interests of the Telugu language and to encourage talent and competitive spirit among school children, a town level inter-school festival was organized by the Kothagudem Club for the first time in 1991 with competitions in four categories — essay writing, elocution, general knowledge and painting. In 1995, it was conducted at district level with competitions in eight categories for two days. In 2000, celebrating ten years, this festival was retitled as "Balotsav" and was conducted at state level, with 3000 children from six districts of Andhra Pradesh (present day Andhra Pradesh and Telangana).

== Event and activities ==
The festival is conducted in the second week of November, close to the Children's Day of India. Competitions are held in categories such as painting, elocution, poetry, essay writing, singing, dancing, classical performances, folk performances, crafts, monodrama and letter writing. Most of these competitions are held for the Telugu language, however a few of them such as the spelling bee and public speaking are conducted for the English language as well.

== In recent years ==
=== 2001–2011 ===
After being recognized at state and national level, the number of participants consistently increased. Over the years, the event widened its scope in terms of competition categories and levels. Currently, competitions are held in 36 categories. The annual participation statistics were as follows;

Years	Participation	Notes
2001	4,000 students from 6 districts	
2002	5,400 students from 12 districts	
2003	7,000 students from 14 districts	
2004	8,000 students from 16 districts	
2005	8,200 students	
2006	8,500 students	
2007	9,000 students	
2008	10,000 students	
2009	12,000 students	
2010	not available	
2011	not available	

=== 2012–2016 ===
In 2012, the 21st iteration of the festival was held from 9 November to 11 November. The special attraction of this iteration was Vyarthamtho Artham (Making creative products by using waste material), and a short film competition. In 2013, the 22nd iteration of the festival was held from 8 November to 10 November. The opening ceremony was launched by one of the youngest authors from India, Nidhi Prakash from Bangalore. The event witnessed 5,112 children from 512 schools. In 2014, the 23rd iteration of the festival was held from 7 November to 9 November, with participants from six different states – Andhra Pradesh, Delhi, Karnataka, Odisha, Tamil Nadu, and Telangana. The festival attracted 15,000 students from Telangana, and 2,000 students from the other five states. In 2015, the 24th iteration of the festival was held from 12 November to 14 November. It was inaugurated by Shaik Sadhiq Pasha, a high school student who participated in the United Nations General Assembly as a part of the children's delegation. In 2016, to mark the silver jubilee, the 25th iteration of the festival was expanded to four days, from 10 November to 13 November with 29 events. The closing ceremony was presided over by the IT and Municipal Administration Minister of Telangana K. T. Rama Rao.

=== 2017 ===
In 2017, the 26th iteration of the festival was conducted from 12 November to 14 November. After it was launched in 1991, the original organizers had originally decided to cancel the festival in 2017. Vasireddy Ramesh Babu, convener of several previous iterations, said during a press conference that the Vasireddy Venkatadri Institute of Technology (VVIT) had expressed its willingness to host the event, and it was subsequently given the project. It was organized in collaboration with Acharya Nagarjuna University, Andhra Pradesh State Road Transport Corporation, Andhra Pradesh State Skill Corporation, and Andhra Pradesh Non-Resident Telugu Society. More than 12,000 children took part in the festival. The closing ceremony was presided over by the Speaker and the Deputy Speaker of the Andhra Pradesh Legislative Assembly, Kodela Siva Prasad Rao and Mandali Buddha Prasad. On a closing note, Vasireddy said that VVIT would be hosting the fest in the future.

== Notes ==
Footnotes

Citations
