= Dummugudem =

- village
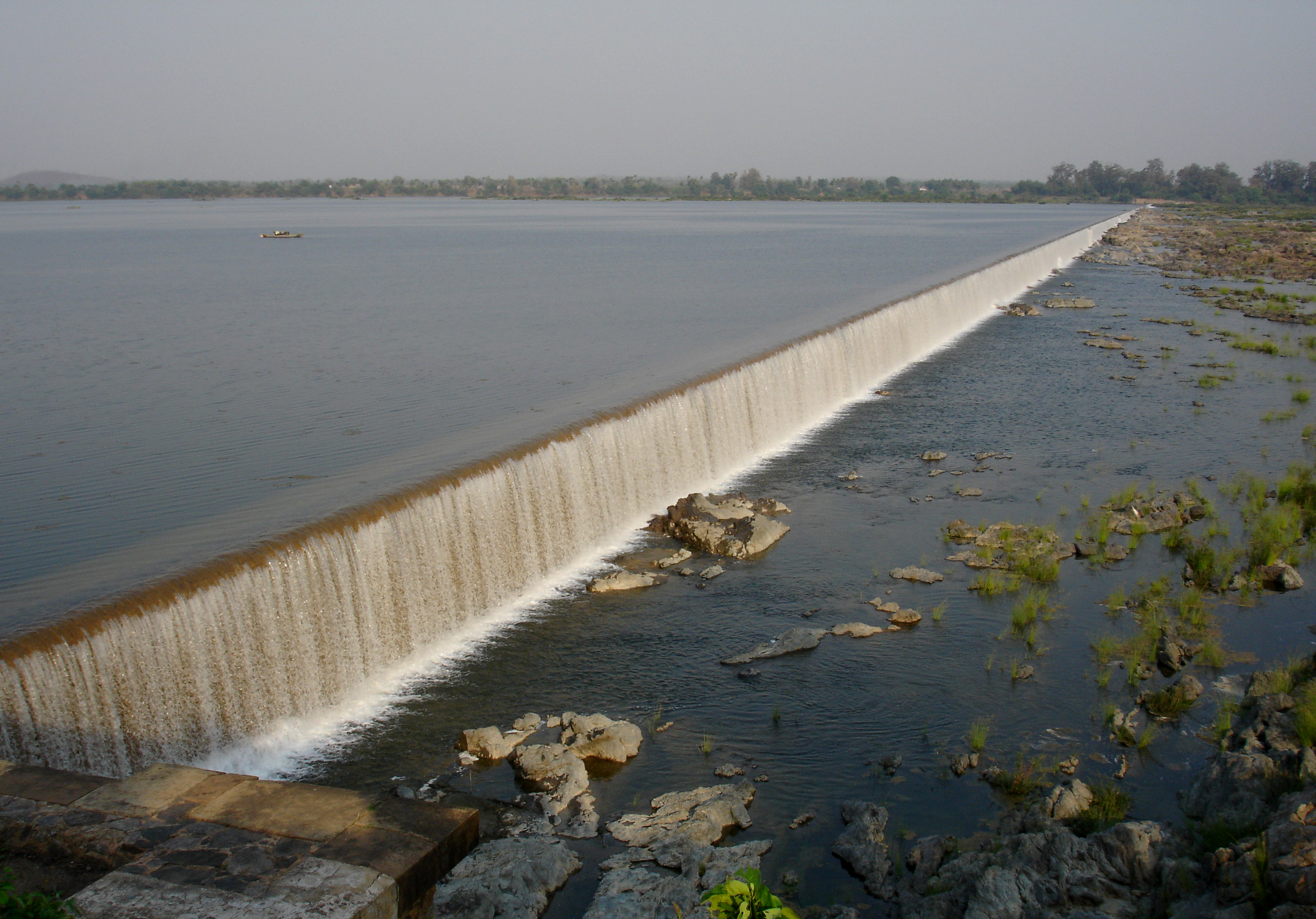
- Dummugudem Barrage on Godavari

- Location in Telangana, India Dummugudem (India)
- Coordinates: 17.8500°N 80.8500°E
- Country: India
- State: Telangana
- District: Bhadradri Kothagudem

Area
  - Total: 10.36 km^{2} (4.00 sq mi)
- Elevation: 47 m (154 ft)

Population (2011)
  - Total: 2,589
  - Density: 249.9/km^{2} (647.2/sq mi)

Languages
  - Official: Telugu
- Time zone: UTC+5:30 (IST)
- Vehicle registration: TS–04
- Climate: hot (Köppen)
- Website: telangana.gov.in

Dummugudem is a village in Bhadradri Kothagudem district of the Indian state of Telangana. It is located in Dummugudem mandal of Bhadrachalam revenue division.

== History ==
On 30 November 1959, Dummagudem was carved out of East Godavari District and combined with the newly created district of Khammam.

== Geography ==
Dummagudem is located at 17.8500°N 80.8500°E. It has an average elevation of 47 metres (157 ft).

Dummugudem barrage across the Godavari River was constructed nearly 150 years back by the British India engineer Sir Arthur Cotton. A major lift irrigation project called Dummugudem Lift Irrigation Scheme is under development drawing water from the barrage pond. Dummugudem to Nagarjunasagar Dam tail pond lift canal is also under construction to transfer surplus Godavari river water to Krishna River.

== Demography ==
The subdivision has a population of 44,393 while Dummugudem town has a population of 3420 (2001 census). The subdivision had a literacy rate of 36% while Dummugudem town had a literacy rate of 65.8 as per the 2001 census. The literacy numbers show a contrast between rural and urban areas of the subdivision.
