= Mangalagiri railway station =

Railway station in Andhra Pradesh, India

Mangalagiri
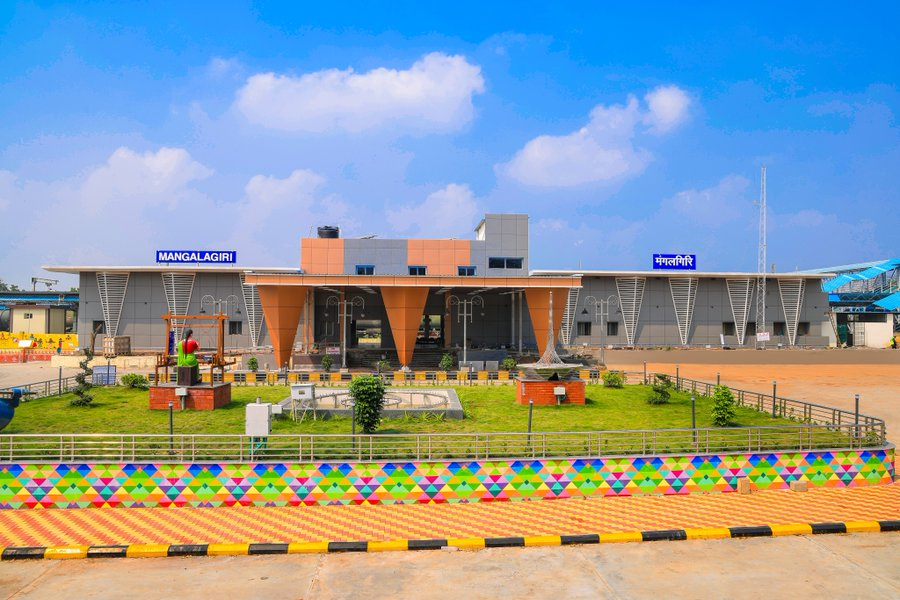
- Mangalagiri Railway Station

General information
- Location: Nidamarru Road, Mangalagiri, Andhra Pradesh; India
- Coordinates: 16.43°N 80.55°E
- System: Indian Railways station
- Owner: Government of India
- Operator: Indian Railways
- Line: Guntur–Krishna Canal section
- Platforms: 4
- Tracks: 4

Construction
- Structure type: Standard (On ground)
- Parking: Available
- Cycle facilities: Available
- Accessible: Disabled access

Other information
- Status: Active
- Station code: MAG
- Zone(s): South Central Railway
- Division(s): Guntur

Services
Preceding station	Indian Railways	Following station
Namburu towards ?	Guntur–Krishna Canal section	Krishna Canal towards ?
Location
- Location within Andhra Pradesh Location within India

Mangalagiri railway station (station code: MAG), is a D-category station in Guntur railway division of Indian Railways. It provides rail connectivity to Mangalagiri which is the part of Mangalagiri Tadepalli Municipal Corporation and is situated on Guntur–Krishna Canal section of South Central Railway zone. It was awarded as tourist friendly station by Andhra Pradesh Tourism Development Corporation.

== History ==
Between 1893 and 1896, 1,288 km (800 mi) of the East Coast State Railway, between Vijayawada and Cuttack was opened for traffic. The southern part of the West Coast State Railway (from Waltair to Vijayawada) was taken over by Madras Railway in 1901.

== See also ==
- List of railway stations in India
