= SLBC =

SLBC may refer to:

- Sierra Leone Broadcasting Corporation
- Sri Lanka Broadcasting Corporation
- Srisailam Left Bank Canal
