= Sitamma Sagar Barrage =

Sita Rama Lift Irrigation Project

- Sitamma Sagar Barrage at Dummugudem Sita Rama Lift Irrigation Project (India)
- Official name: Sita Rama Lift Irrigation Project
- Country: India
- Location: Dummugudem, Bhadradri Kothagudem District
- Coordinates: 17°52′18″N 80°53′09″E
- Purpose: Multi-purpose
- Status: Under construction
- Construction cost: 2,500–5,000 crores
- Built by: Larsen & Toubro
- Owner: Government of Telangana
- Operators: Irrigation & CAD Department, Government of Telangana

Dam and spillways
- Type of dam: Barrage
- Impounds: Godavari River
- Height: 68 m (223 ft)
- Height (foundation): 20 meters
- Length: 1,263 m (4,144 ft)
- Spillways: 52 Nos, 15.0m x 15.0M (Radial) and 13 Nos.,15.0M x 16.0M
- Spillway capacity: 88,614 Cumecs

Reservoir
- Creates: Sita Rama Lift Irrigation Project
- Total capacity: 36.576 tmcft
- Catchment area: 2,81,000 km^{2}

Sita Rama Lift Irrigation Project
- Operator: Telangana State Power Generation Corporation Limited
- Commission date: Planned
- Type: Barrage
- Hydraulic head: 16.50m (Gross head)/ 14.85 (Net head)
- Turbines: 8x40MW
- Installed capacity: 320 MW
- Annual generation: 1016.88 MU (at 50% dependability)

Sita Rama Lift Irrigation Project is an under-construction barrage across Godavari River with run-of-river hydroelectric power project at Dummugudem village, Bhadradri Kothagudem district in Telangana. The project is proposed at about 200 meters downstream of the existing Dummugudem anicut built about 150 years ago.

== History ==
Prior to Bifurcation of Andhra Pradesh, two project namely Rajiv Dummugudem Lift Irrigation Scheme and Indira Sagar Rudram Kota Lift Irrigation Scheme were proposed in order to cater to the irrigation needs of the left out ayacut from existing irrigation schemes. Even after execution of this scheme, about 2.55 Lakh Acres would still remain to be covered by any future irrigation scheme. After bifurcation of Andhra Pradesh, seven Mandals of Khammam district were merged in West Godavari district of Andhra Pradesh. In this process the intake structure of proposed Indira Sagar Lift Irrigation Scheme went into the administrative boundary of Andhra Pradesh.

In view of above, Government of Telangana decided not only to integrate earlier proposed Indira Sagar and Rajiv Sagar Lift Irrigation Scheme into one lift irrigation scheme but also to cover the Gap Ayacut which is not coming under any present or future irrigation scheme. Accordingly, the project is now renamed as Sita Rama Lift Irrigation Scheme is being formulated to cover about 9.36 Lakh Acres of Khammam, Bhadradri Kothagudem and Mahabubabad Districts of Telangana. The project has been planned to execute in two phases. Phase – I of the Sita Rama Lift Irrigation Scheme will cover the Khammam, Bhadradri Kothagudem & Mahabubabad Districts whereas Phase – II will also cover the same districts. Phase – I of this scheme covers command area of 2,72,921 Ha with new ayacut of about 1,33,085 Ha and Stabilization of about 1,39,836 Ha.

Dummugudem Anicut is a 150-year-old masonry weir built across river Godavari near Dummugudem village in Badradri Kothagudem district of Telangana state. Keeping in mind the requirements of Sita Rama LIS, the State Government of Telangana has contemplated to augment the storage capacity and develop a run-of-river hydroelectric project by constructing a barrage across river Godavari at about 200 meters downstream of the existing Dummugudem anicut with pond level at 63.00m elevation.

The barrage is nearby to the temple town of Bhadrachalam where Sita Ramachandraswamy Temple is present. The temple is often referred to as Dakshina Ayodhya, Bhadradri or Bhadrachalam and is dedicated to Hindu god, Rama. The barrage is named after consort of Rama, Sita.

== Sita rama Lift Irrigation Project ==
Sita Rama Lift Irrigation Project will be constructed on the right side of the barrage and will have an installed capacity of 320 MW (8x40MW Bulb Turbine units). The project will generate 719.12 MU in a 90% dependable year, 765.04 MU in a 75% dependable year and 1016.88 MU in a 50% dependable year and around 999.48 MU per year on an average basis.
