= Nagarjuna Sagar Dam =

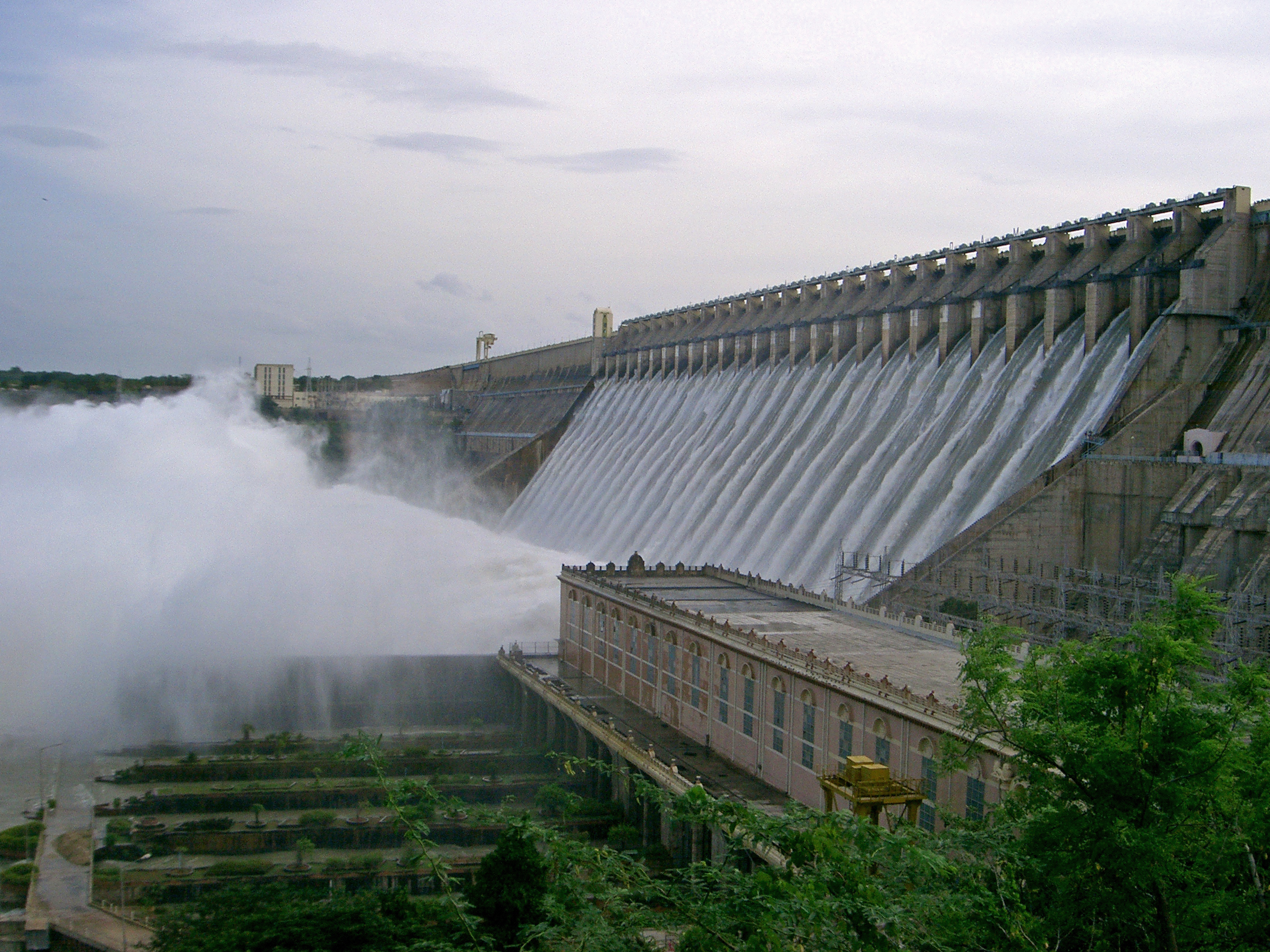
- Nagarjuna Sagar Dam

- Location within Andhra Pradesh
- Location: Nalgonda district, Telangana & Palnadu district, Andhra Pradesh
- Coordinates: 16°34′32″N 79°18′42″E
- Purpose: Hydroelectric & Irrigation
- Construction began: 10 December 1955
- Opening date: 1967; 59 years ago
- Construction cost: 132.32 crore rupees

Dam and spillways
- Impounds: Krishna River
- Height: 124 metres (407 ft) from the deepest river bed level
- Length: 1,550 metres (5,085 ft)

Reservoir
- Creates: Nagarjuna Sagar Reservoir
- Total capacity: 11.56 km^{3} (9×10^{6} acre⋅ft) (405 Tmcft)
- Active capacity: 6.92 cubic kilometres (1.66 cu mi) (244.41 Tmcft)
- Catchment area: 215,000 square kilometres (83,000 sq mi)
- Surface area: 285 km^{2} (110 sq mi)

Power Station
- Operators: Andhra Pradesh Power Generation Corporation; Telangana State Power Generation Corporation Limited
- Commission date: 1978–1985
- Turbines: 1 x 110 MW Francis turbine, 7 x 100.8 MW reversible Francis turbines
- Installed capacity: 816 MW (1,094,000 hp)

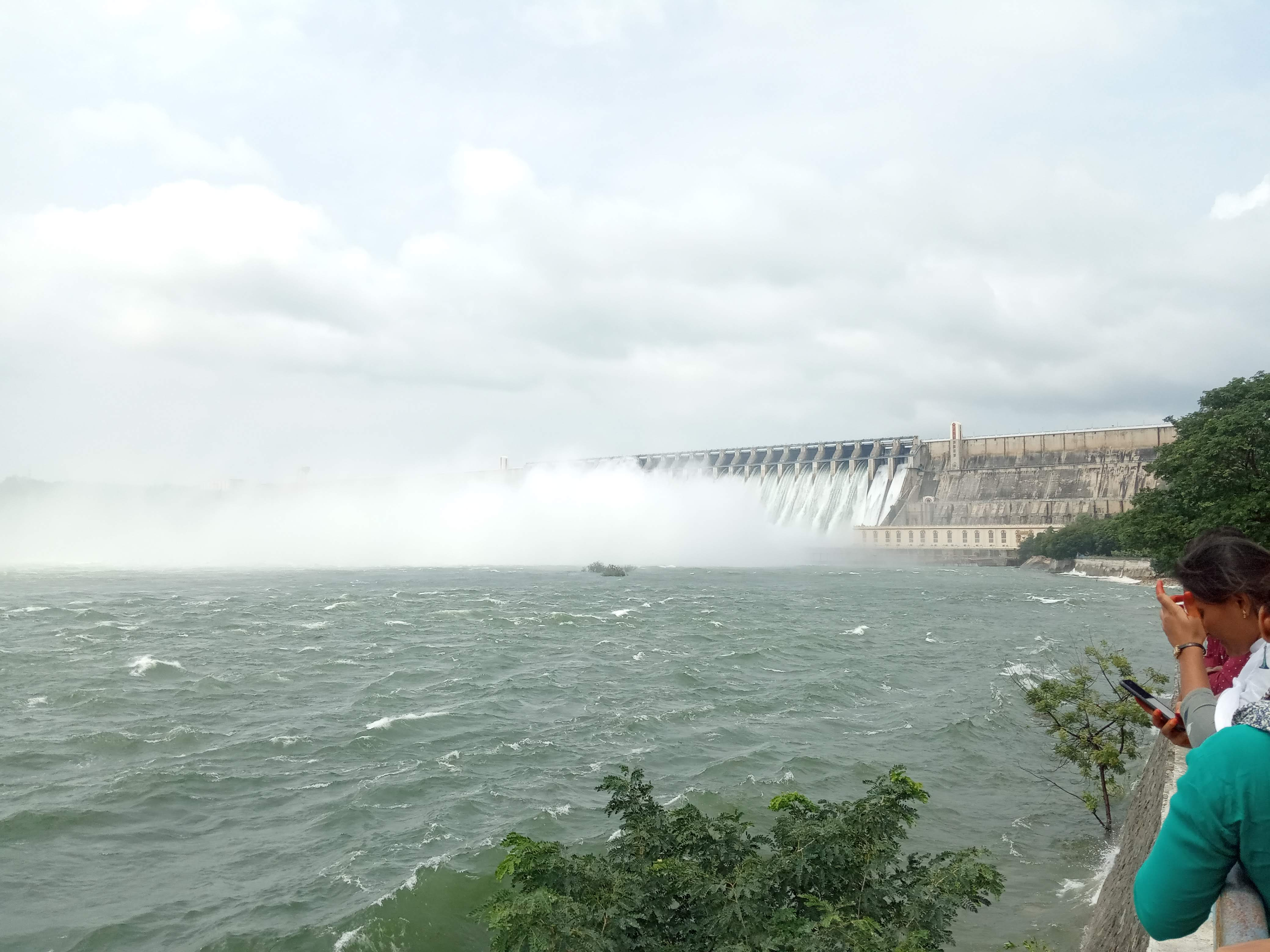
Nagarjuna Sagar gates opened

Nagarjuna Sagar Dam is a masonry dam across the Krishna River at Nagarjuna Sagar, which straddles the border between Nalgonda district in Telangana, and Palnadu district in Andhra Pradesh. The dam provides irrigation water to the districts of Nalgonda, Suryapet, Khammam, Bhadradri Kothagudem districts of Telangana and also Krishna, Guntur, Palnadu,, Prakasam, and parts of West Godavari districts of Andhra Pradesh. It is also a source of electricity generation for the national grid.

Constructed between 1955 and 1967, the dam created a water reservoir with gross storage capacity of 11.472 billion cubic metres (405.1×10^{9} cu ft), its effective capacity is 6.92 cubic km or 244.41 Tmcft. The dam is 124 metres (407 ft) tall from its deepest foundation and 1.6 kilometres (5,200 ft) long with 26 flood gates which are 13 metres (42 ft) wide and 14 metres (45 ft) tall. It is jointly operated by Andhra Pradesh and Telangana.

Nagarjuna Sagar Dam was the first in a series of major infrastructure projects termed as "modern temples" initiated for achieving the Green Revolution in India. It is also one of the earliest multi-purpose irrigation and hydroelectric projects in India.

== History ==
The Nizam made the British engineers begin the survey work for this dam across the Krishna River in the year 1903.

The project's construction was officially inaugurated by Prime Minister Jawaharlal Nehru on 10 December 1955 and proceeded for the next twelve years. Raja Vasireddy Ramagopala Krishna Maheswara Prasad, popularly known as the late Muktyala Raja, was instrumental in the construction of the Nagarjuna Sagar Dam through active political lobbying and the donation of one hundred and ten million GBP in 1952 and 22,000 ha (55,000 acres) of land. It was the tallest masonry dam in the world at that time, built entirely with local know-how under the engineering leadership of Kanuri Lakshmana Rao.

The reservoir water was released into the left and right bank canals by Prime Minister Indira Gandhi on 4 August 1967. Construction of the hydroelectric power plant followed, with power generation increasing between 1978 and 1985 as additional units came into service. In 2015, the diamond jubilee celebrations of the project's inauguration were held, alluding to the prosperity the dam has ushered into the region.

The construction of the dam submerged an ancient Buddhist settlement, Nagarjunakonda, which was the capital of the Ikshvaku dynasty in the 1st and 2nd centuries and the successors of the Satavahanas in the Eastern Deccan. Excavations yielded 30 Buddhist monasteries as well as artwork and inscriptions of historical importance. Prior to the reservoir's flooding, monuments were dug up and relocated. Some were moved to Nagarjunakonda, now an island in the middle of the reservoir. Others were moved to the nearby mainland village of Anupu.

The site of the dam was selected in 2022 to be developed as part of the UDAN scheme. The selection calls for the development of a water aerodrome at the site.

== Data ==
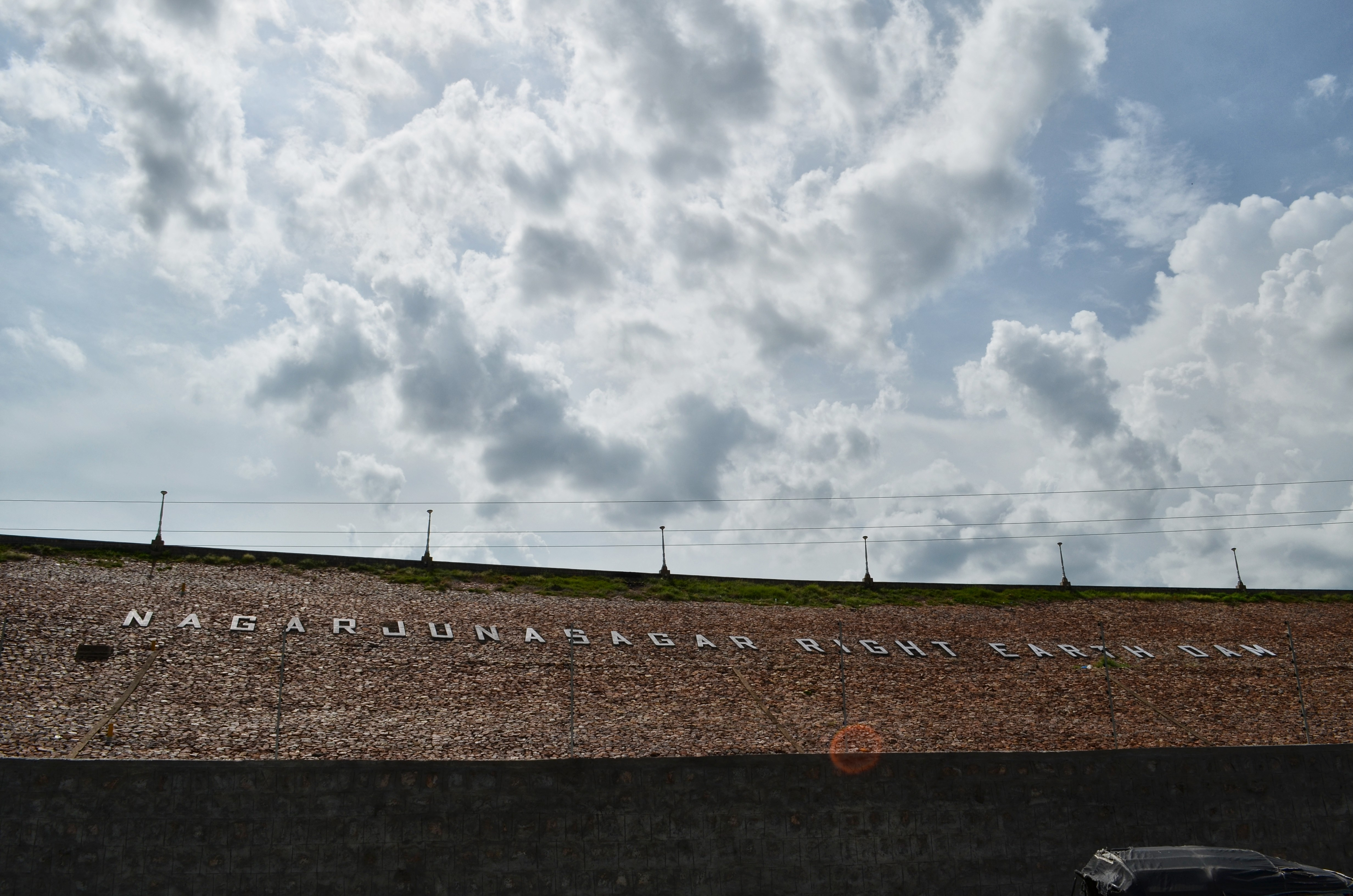
Nagarjuna Sagar right Earth Dam

- Catchment Area : 214,185 km^{2} (82,697 sq mi)
- Full Reservoir Level (FRL): 179.83 metres (590 ft) msl
- Water spread area at FRL: 285 km^{2}
- Gross storage capacity at FRL: 312 TMC
- MDDL of river sluices: 137.3 metres (450 ft) msl
- Masonry dam
  - Spillway of dam : 471 m
  - Non-over flow dam : 979 m
  - Length of Masonry dam : 1450 m
  - Maximum height : 125 m
- Earth dam
  - Total Length of Earth dam : 3414 m
  - Maximum height : 128 m
- Power Generation
  - Power Units : 1 No. conventional (110 MW capacity), 7 nos Reversible (100 MW capacity)
- Canal power house
  - Right side : 3 units 30 MW (each)
  - Left side : 2 units 30 MW (each)

== Utilisation ==
=== Irrigation ===
The right canal (Jawahar canal) is 203 km (126 mi) long with a maximum 311.5 cumecs capacity and irrigates 4,520 square kilometres (1.117×10^{6} acres) of land in Guntur and Prakasam districts. The left canal (Lalbahadur Shastri canal) is 179 km (111 mi) long with maximum 311.5 cumecs capacity and irrigates 4,080 square kilometres (1.008×10^{6} acres) of land in Nalgonda, Suryapet, Krishna, West Godavari and Khammam districts. The project transformed the economy of above districts. 54 villages (48 in Nalgonda and 6 in Guntur) were submersed in water and 24,000 people were affected. The relocation of the people was completed by 2007.

Alimineti Madhava Reddy lift irrigation canal draws water from the Nagarjuna Sagar reservoir to irrigate 1,500 square kilometres (0.37×10^{6} acres) of land in Nalgonda district. This lift scheme with pump house located near Puttamgandi village on the left bank of Krishna river also supplies nearly 20 TMC water for the drinking water needs of Hyderabad city. Nearly 80% of the Nagarjuna Sagar water used in Hyderabad city is available for irrigation use in Nalgonda district in the form of regenerated water/treated sewage water. In addition, the high level flood flow canal drawing water from the left side shore of the reservoir also supplies irrigation water in Nalgonda district.

=== Power generation ===
The hydroelectric plant has a power generation capacity of 815.6 MW with 8 units (1x110 MW+7x100.8 MW). The first unit was commissioned on 7 March 1978 and the 8th unit on 24 December 1985. The right canal plant has a power generation capacity of 90 MW with 3 units of 30 MW each. The left canal plant has a power generation capacity of 60 MW with 2 units of 30 MW each. The tail pond is under advanced stage of construction to put to use the pumped storage features of 7 x 100.8 MW units. And it will be used for irrigation.

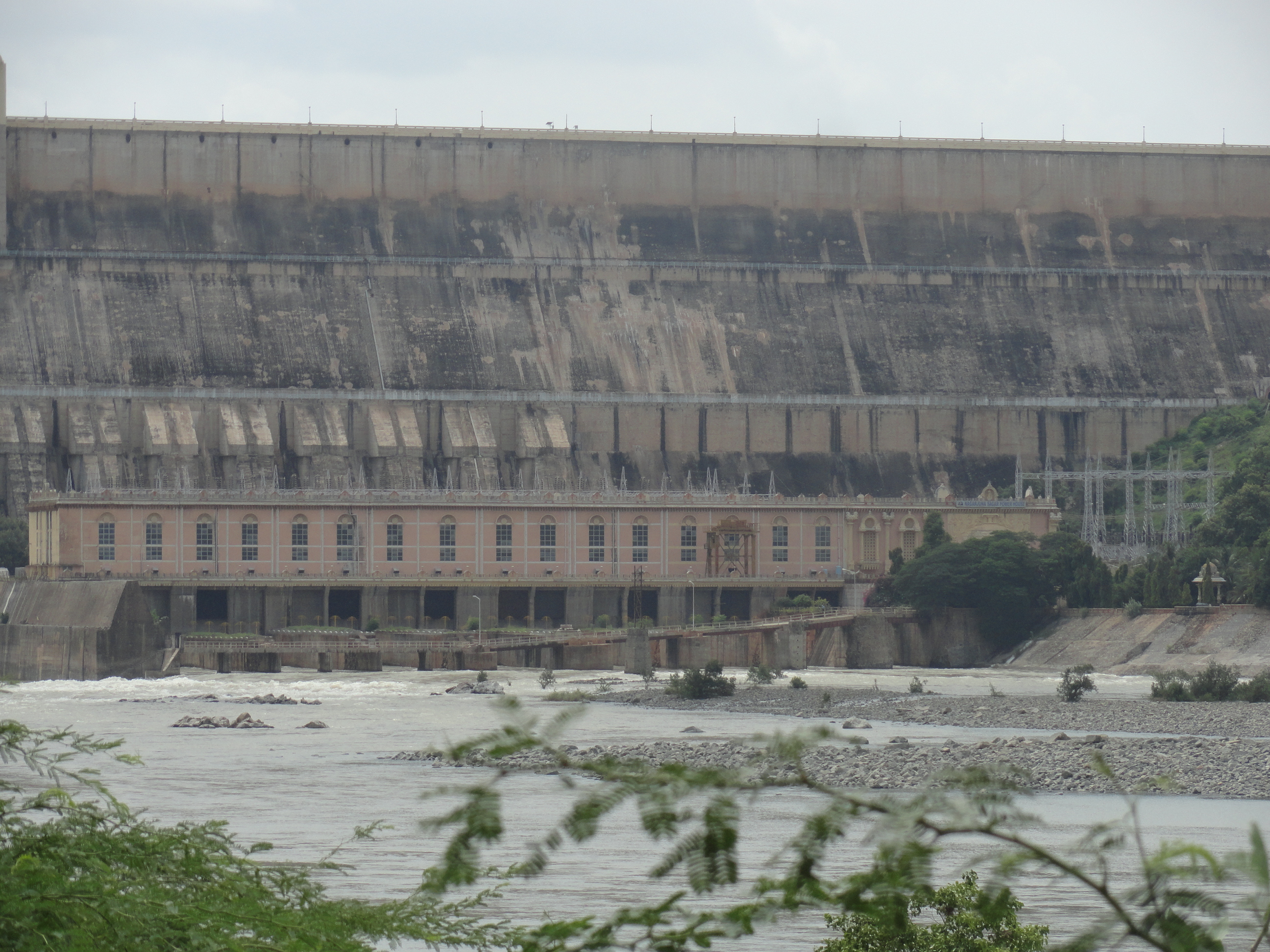
Nagarjuna sagar dam power generation

Many times, it happens that power generation from the 150 MW canal based units is not optimised when the Nagarjunasagar reservoir is overflowing on its spillway and less water is required for irrigation from the canals during the monsoon floods. Power generation from the canal based hydro units can be optimised by running these units during the flooding period by releasing the water fully into the canals. The unwanted canal water can be released into the natural stream when it is crossing the major stream. Thus run off power can be generated from the water going down unutilised into the river by the canal based power units also.

The water level in the Nagarjunasagar reservoir shall be maintained above the minimum level required for these units in most of the time by releasing water from the upstream Srisailam reservoir to optimise the power generation from the canal based units during dry season.

== Tourism ==
Nagarjunasagar Dam is one of the popular weekend getaways. It is 65 km away from Nalgonda, 97 km away from Suryapet, 146 km away from Guntur, 184 km away from Vijayawada and 152 km away from Hyderabad. Thousands of tourists visit the dam when gates are open in monsoon season (around September / October).

Some of the nearby tourist places of interest include:

- Buddhavanam, Telangana
- Nagarjunakonda in Andhra Pradesh – Has to be reached by a boat from boating point operated by Andhra Pradesh Tourism Development Corporation or TSTDC.
- Anupu in Andhra Pradesh
- Ethipothala Falls near Macherla in Andhra Pradesh – The water released from the Nagarjuna Sagar right bank canal, the Chandravanka and Suryavanka streams keeps the water fall live or flowing during the rainy season.

== Environmental aspects ==
The artificial lift irrigation based diversion of the river from its natural delta area into Nalgonda district caused erosion of the fluorine-rich volcanic rocks in Nalgonda and contaminated its groundwater supply. It also caused uncertain flows of water into the Krishna River delta area and a shrinkage of the natural wonder "The Kolleru Lake". The use of erosion resistant canals interfered with the natural silting process of a river to the deltas and created long-term ecological issues to the health of the delta lands. Reduced flows into the sea resulted in land salination and sea encroachment of coastal lands in Diviseema. The diversion of Krishna water for 200 km to Hyderabad resulted in massive evaporation losses especially in summer and reduced the size of Krishna River. Many forest preserves along the natural Krishna flow are now categorized as "completely degraded" forest areas. The Krishna River was once home to an ecological wonderland of freshwater fish and aquatic population that is now completely depopulated. The river stopped being navigable since the year of Nagarjuna sagar construction.

=== Impact on Hyderabad water security ===
Water planning for Hyderabad city started in 1920 with the tapping of Musi River for 15 Mgd. It progressed to tapping Esi (Himayat Sagar 1927 – 11mgd) and Manjira (1965–1993 – Majira and Singur dams) for another additional 130 Mgd. It took a huge leap during 1995–2004 with the commissioning of Krishna river water project (Phases I – III) at a total cost of over ten thousand crores to supply an additional 190Mgd to Hyderabad from Nagarjuna sagar. The project incurs an additional evaporation and leakage loss of 64 Mgd. About 30% of the water naturally flowing to Krishna Delta before 1995 is now diverted to Hyderabad.

== Future potential ==
=== Methods to harness huge dead storage ===
- The left and right bank canals sill level is fixed at 490 feet (149 m) MSL to supply irrigation water to two million acres. The unutilized storage capacity is nearly 180 TMC below the canals sill/bed level. Nagarjuna Sagar reservoir also meets the Krishna delta water requirements to the extent of 80 TMC by letting water downstream into the river. Nearly 1.3 million acres (5,300 km^{2}) is irrigated under Krishna Delta Canals. There is a possibility to utilize most of this idle dead storage capacity to store the river flood water further and to use as carry over storage. Nearly 150 TMC idle storage up to 380 feet (116 m) MSL, can be used leaving 30 TMC for silt settlement. This is possible by installing Water Powered Pump (WPP) units at the base of the dam.
- It is technically feasible to generate power from the existing hydro turbines from the lower head (75 to 50 meters) by running the turbines below the rated speed. However, major modifications of generators are to be done for running below the rated speed and improve the power generation efficiency.
- The sill level of the right bank canal powerhouse (3 x 30 MW) is at 479 feet (146 m) MSL. It is possible to draw water from the dead storage by tapping water from the penstocks to feed water to a pump house (3 x 15 MW) located on the left side of the powerhouse. The pump house will have three pump sets each of 5000 cusecs flow capacity to feed into the NS main right bank canal. Power generation from the 90 MW powerhouse is no way affected since its units can only operate when the reservoir level is above 540 ft MSL and the pumping units need to operate below the 508 ft MSL to draw water from the dead storage. Thus nearly 50 TMC water can be utilized during the drought years. The power generation units are normally in operation for five months in a year when the water level is above its minimum draw down level at 540 feet (165 m) MSL. During the drought years, the additional water availability is more valuable than the pumping power consumption. The consumed pumping power is compensated fully by the enhanced generation from the 44 MW capacity mini hydel plants located on the downstream canals.
- The sill level of river sluices of the dam is at 450 feet (137 m) MSL. Nearly 90 TMC of water from the dead storage can be released from the river sluices to the downstream river tail pond during drought periods and further pumped to the adjacent right bank canal by constructing a pumped storage hydroelectric power (PSHP) station. The PSHP station can also be used to transfer Godavari water to the Nagarjuna Sagar reservoir by converting the existing right bank canal powerhouse (3 x 30 MW) into PSHP units to transfer 15,000 cusecs into the Nagarjuna Sagar reservoir. Both PSHPs together can also be used for energy storage purposes on daily basis by consuming surplus power and generating electricity during the peak load hours.

The reservoir dead storage water below the 125 m MSL can be fully released into the downstream river/tail pond through the existing diversion tunnel which was in use to divert the river flow during the dam construction.

=== Pumped storage hydro power potential ===
Nagarjuna Sagar reservoir, serving as low level reservoir, has potential to install nearly 2,18,000 MW high head pumped storage hydroelectric plants on its right side.

=== Assured water supply to Hyderabad city ===
At present nearly one Tmcft per month or 250 million gallons per day or 350 cusecs is supplied to the Hyderabad city from Nagarjuna Sagar (NS) reservoir. The water supply is nearly 50% of the total city water requirement. This water pumping scheme is part of Alimineti Madhava Reddy lift irrigation project with its foreshore pumping station at Puttamgandi which has nearly 2400 cusecs pumping capacity. The water supply to the Hyderabad city is nearly 15% of its total capacity. The approach channel from the reservoir to the Puttamgandi pump house (PH) is located at 16°34′31″N 79°07′51″E where the Bhimanapalli Vagu tributary is joining the Krishna river. The minimum draw down level (MDDL) of the PH is 502 feet (153 m) MSL below which water can not be pumped from NS reservoir. The reliability / dependability of the PH for supplying assured water supply to Hyderabad city, is not adequate due to meagre inflows into the NS reservoir in some years and the need to deplete the NS reservoir water below 502 ft MSL for other purposes. In these circumstances, adequate water is to be stored above the 502 ft MSL to maintain 100% assured water source without depending totally on NS reservoir.

This is possible by constructing a balancing reservoir by separating some area of the NS reservoir with a new dam across the Bhimanapalli Vagu tributary at 16°34′33″N 79°06′53″E just upstream of the Puttamgandi PH approach channel. This new dam with FRL 590 feet (180 m) MSL, would not submerge any additional area other than the area already submerged by the NS reservoir. The water inflows from the Bhimanapalli Vagu tributary joining the NS reservoir are first impounded by the new dam and if found excess over flows into the downstream NS reservoir. This new balancing reservoir's live capacity is nearly 6 Tmcft above the 502 ft MDDL which is equal to six months water supply to the Hyderabad city. This reservoir would have provision to receive water from the Puttamgandi PH when inflows from the Bhimanapalli Vagu tributary is not satisfactory and water is at adequate level in NS reservoir during monsoon months. When water level of NS reservoir goes below the 502 ft MSL, water is fed to the Puttamgandi PH approach channel from the new balancing reservoir for pumping water needs of Hyderabad city. The cost of this new dam project would be nearly 1.5 billion rupees only which will provide 100% assured water supply to the Hyderabad city without depending on the water availability from NS reservoir during the non monsoon months and drought years.

Sunkishala underground pump house is under construction at an estimated cost of Rs 1450 crores for drawing water up to 462 feet (141 m) MSL from the dead storage.

=== Godavari water transfer via Nagarjuna Sagar left canal to Krishna River ===
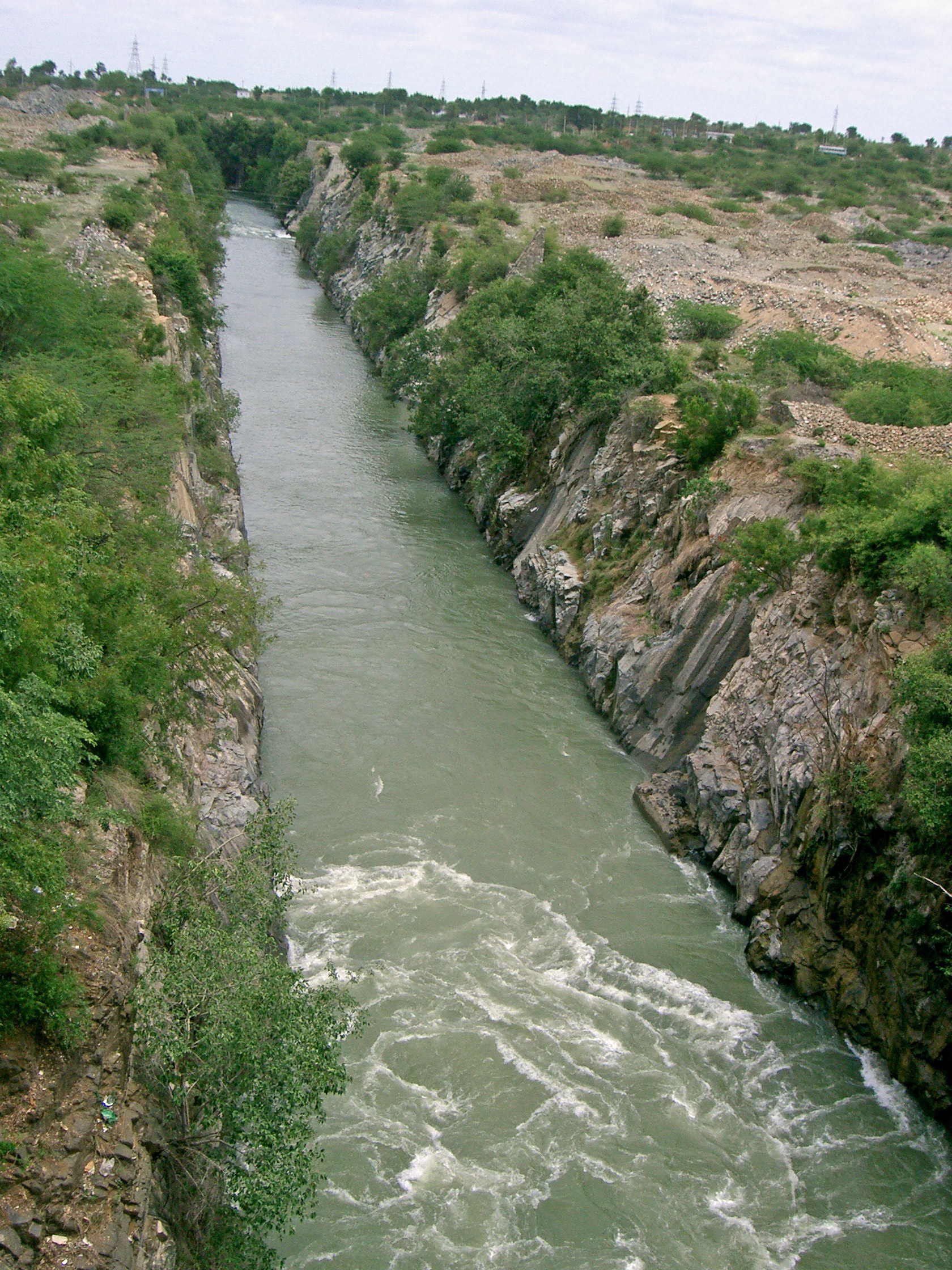
Nagarjuna Left Canal deep cut before entering the gravity tunnel

The Nagarjuna Sagar left canal supplies nearly 130 TMC of water for irrigation needs in Telangana and Andhra Pradesh states. This is a contour gravity canal with gradual downward gradient (≃ 1:10,000) along the water flow direction. This canal can be used for transferring nearly 80 TMC Godavari River water into the Nagarjuna Sagar reservoir in addition to supplying the Godavari water under its entire command area. Thus a total of 210 TMC of Godavari water can be used in the Krishna basin of Telangana state from Srisailam and Jurala reservoirs for the new projects with 100% water dependability. Godavari water transferred into the Nagarjuna Sagar reservoir and Krishna main river can also be used for the proposed Palamuru lift irrigation and Nakkalagandi lift irrigation schemes in Telangana.

This is possible by re-engineering of the left canal to reverse its water flow direction from the location (near 17°22′13″N 80°21′43″E) where Godavari water would be pumped into this canal. The canal embankments would be raised to facilitate flow reversing towards Nagarjuna Sagar reservoir and intermediate pumping stations (with low head & high flow concrete volute pumps) would be installed near the Paleru balancing reservoir, Pedda Devulapalli balancing reservoir, left canal head regulator on the rim of Nagarjuna Sagar reservoir and the existing major aqueducts across Halia, Musi and Munneru tributaries. The cost of this canal redesigning and the associated pump houses would be one third of a new scheme to transfer Godavari River water into Nagarjuna Sagar reservoir at its FRL 590 feet (180 m) MSL with least possible total pumping head. The above re-engineering of the canal is similar to modifications carried out to reverse the water flow of ancient Grand Canal under Eastern Route project of South to North Water Transfer in China.

== Nearest Cities ==
- Nalgonda- 65 km
- Suryapet- 97 km
- Narasaraopet- 104 km
- Khammam- 150 km
- Guntur- 150 km
- Hyderabad- 160 km
- Vijayawada-190 km
- Warangal- 200 km

== See also ==
- Nagarjuna Sagar tail pond
- Dummugudem Lift Irrigation Scheme
- Krishna Water Disputes Tribunal
- List of dams and reservoirs in India
