= Vasireddy Venkatadri International Technological University =

Engineering college in Namburu, Pedakakani, Guntur, Andhra Pradesh, India

- Emblem of the University
- Other name: VVITU
- Former name: Vasireddy Venkatadri Institute of Technology
- Type: Private
- Established: 2007
- Chancellor: Vasireddy Vidya Sagar
- Vice-Chancellor: Dr. Kodali Rambabu
- Principal: Dr. Yennapusa Mallikarjuna Reddy
- Location: Namburu, Andhra Pradesh, India; 16.343460°N 80.524287°E
- Campus: Rural
- Colors
- Website: vvitu.ac.in

Vasireddy Venkatadri International Technological University (VVITU) is a state private university located in Namburu, Pedakakani, Guntur, Andhra Pradesh, India. The university has a total capacity of 10000 students across its undergraduate and postgraduate programs in engineering, management and sciences.

Undergraduate programs include the Bachelor of Technology (B.Tech) degree in various disciplines such as civil engineering, electrical engineering, mechanical engineering, electronics and communication engineering, computer science and engineering, information technology, artificial intelligence and data science, among others.

Postgraduate programs include Master of Technology (M.Tech) degrees in specializations such as computer science and engineering, very-large-scale integration (VLSI), power electronics, machine drawing, and structural engineering.

VVITU also houses a business school offering postgraduate programs in management, designed to provide students with practical skills and industry-oriented knowledge in business and entrepreneurship.

The college was founded in 2007 by Vasireddy Vidya Sagar.

The institution is accredited with 'A' grade by National Assessment and Accreditation Council (NAAC) in March 2016 with a CGPA of 3.09 out of four. In addition to the NAAC accreditation, the Electronics and Communication Engineering (ECE) and Information Technology (IT) departments of the college were recognized by the National Board of Accreditation (NBA) in June 2016. The National Board of Accreditation (NBA) has accorded accreditation to three other engineering branches namely Computer Science and Engineering (CSE), Mechanical Engineering (ME), Electrical and Electronics Engineering (EEE) on 19 January 2018.

== Admissions ==
=== Undergraduate ===
Students are admitted to four-year undergraduate programs in two categories: A and B. Category-A seats make up 70 percent of the college's total seats, and are filled through Convener and the Andhra Pradesh EAPCET. Category-B seats are filled by the administration through newspaper advertisements.

=== Graduate ===
Students are also admitted to the two-year graduate programs in two categories: A and B. Category-A seats make up 70 percent of the total. 15 percent of the Category-B seats, which are filled by the administration, are available to NRI candidates. MCA seats are filled in the same manner.

== Departments ==
- Civil Engineering
- Artificial Intelligence & Data Science
- Computer Science & Engineering
- Electrical & Electronics Engineering
- Electronics & Communication Engineering
- Information Technology
- Mechanical Engineering
- Science & Humanities
- Artificial Intelligence & Machine Learning

== Campus facilities ==
=== Library ===
The college has a computerized library with over one lakh collection of academic, reference and general-interest books. The library subscribes to national and international magazines, journals, periodicals and leading national daily newspapers.

=== Digital library ===
The digital library has 30 computer systems with five-Mbps Internet and backup, National Programme on Technology Enhanced Learning (NPTEL) E-lectures and videos, a developing-library network (DELNET), Institute of Electrical and Electronics Engineers (IEEE) Society periodicals, ASME, ASCE, Open-access journals, dissertations, archives, and databases are available at library portal.

=== Siemens ===
Siemens Industry Software India Pvt. Lmt.(SISW) signed an agreement with the State of Andhra Pradesh Skill Development Corporation for the establishment of six Centre of excellence(COE) and thirty Technical Institutes across the state on 30 June 2015 at APSSDC Office, Hyderabad. These technical-Skill Development Institutes training centers are focused on improving the skills of students in vocational trades. VVITU has over 100+ labs established as a Siemens centre of excellence.

=== Google Code Labs ===
The college has received a fund of 2 Lakh US Dollars from Google Inc., USA, for the establishment of Code Lab in association with Andhra Pradesh Skill Development Corporation (APSSDC) on 5 May 2018.

=== Other facilities ===
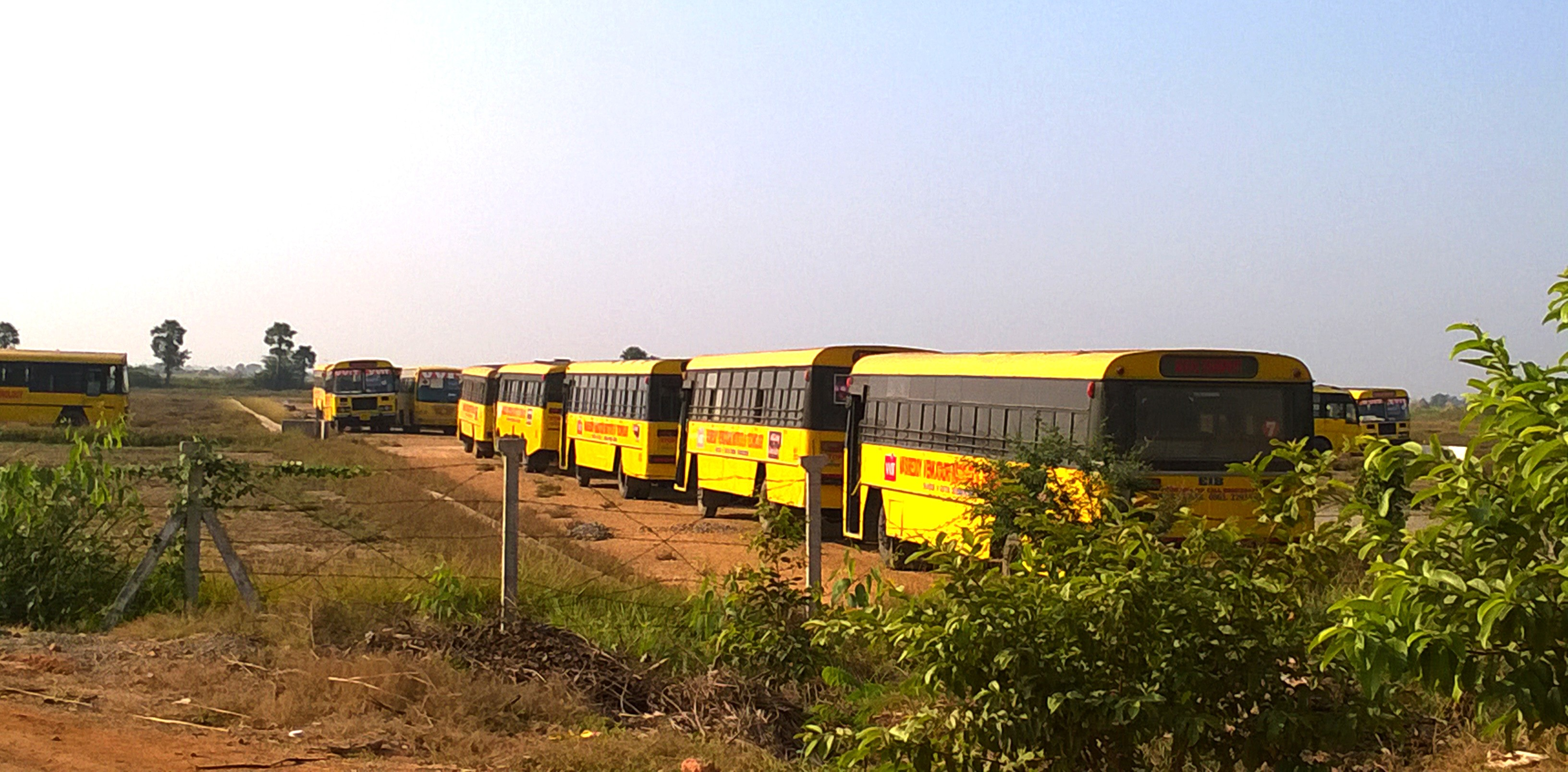
College buses parked on campus

Other facilities include Wi-Fi, a health centre with a doctor and nurse, a water-purification plant, an entrepreneurial-development center, a 250KW solar-power plant with 400 solar panels, an Andhra Pradesh State Skill Development Corporation incubation center and a 90-buses fleet with service to Guntur, Tenali, Vijayawada and other major towns and mandals.

== Campus life ==
=== Clubs ===
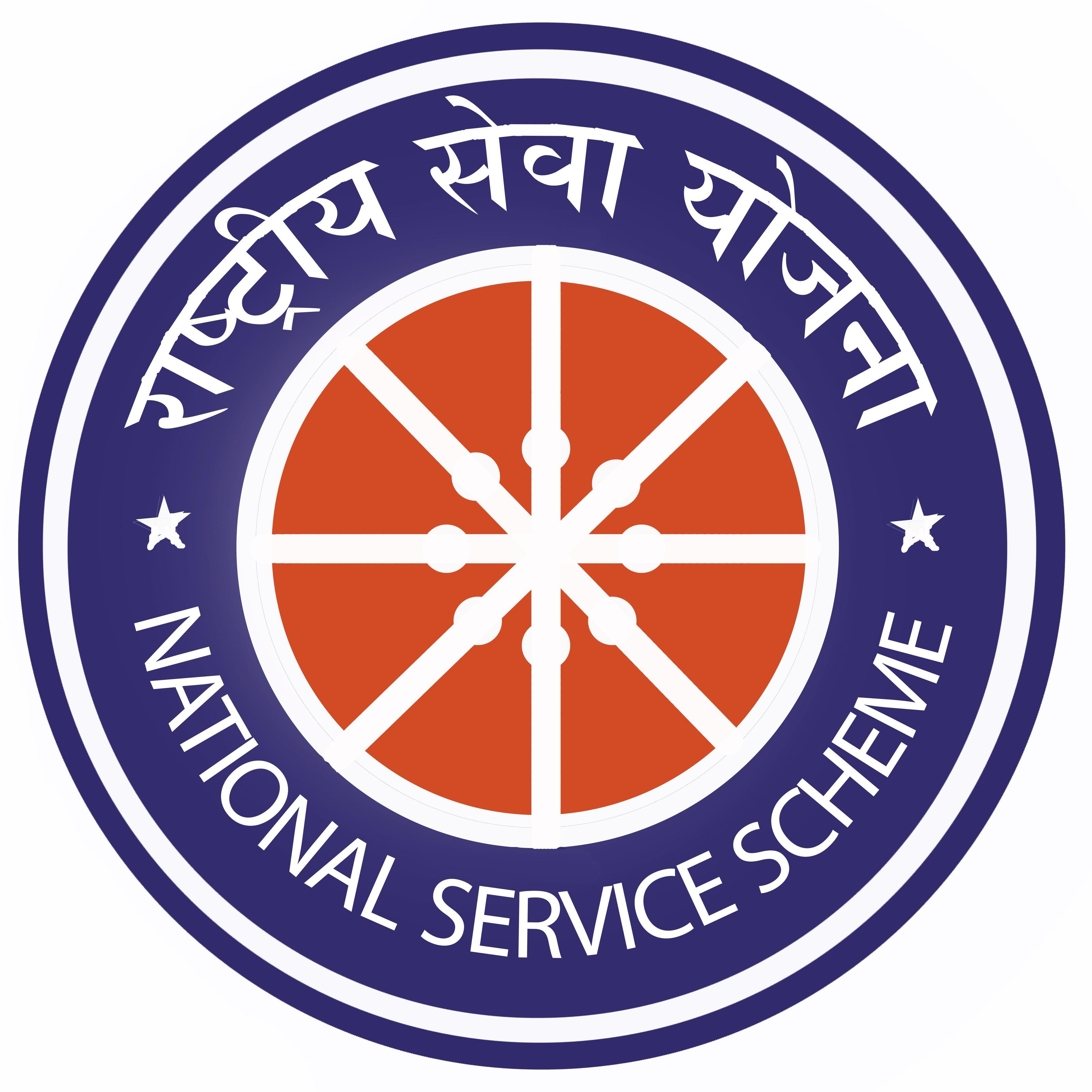

More than 15 clubs are available for students interested in fields such as Animation and Graphics, Dance(Western and Classic),Literary, Movie appreciation, Telugu appreciation, Music(Vocal and Instrumental), Theater club, Sports, Culinary, Telugu appreciation, Yoga, Martial-Arts, Social and political awareness.

=== NCC and NSS ===
The college's National Cadet Corps wing is made up of a battalion from the 2(A) Armed Squadron for men and the 10(A) Girls Battalion for women. VVIT also has a National Service Scheme division.

=== Sports and games ===
The school has facilities for cricket, volleyball, Basketball, tennikoit, Throwball, Kho kho, Kabaddi, badminton and athletics. Chess, table tennis and carrom are played in the indoor arena.

=== Indian School of Business ===
ISB's center for Innovation and Entrepreneurship Development Cell students in collaboration with Andhra Pradesh and Telangana created a Technology Entrepreneurship Program to root the entrepreneur era.

=== Student Activity Council ===
Student Activity Council is a student body in the institute which enables students to organize, conduct and monitor major and minor activities that will enable the student to acquire leadership skills. Student activity council interacts with students and helps them if they have any problems. They make sure that anti-Ragging is present.

== Events and activities ==
=== VIVA and College Day ===
The annual VIVA-VVIT festival is usually held in December, with intercollegiate competitions in sports, literature, culture, and technology. College Day follows the festival. The VIVA-VVIT festival is held on 21 and 22 December of every year. This VIVA-VVIT fest is certified to be the largest college fest in Andhra Pradesh. College Day follows the festival on 23 December.

=== Balotsav ===
Balotsav (English: Children's festival) is an annual international cultural festival for Telugu children. In 2017, the 26th iteration of the fest was conducted from 12 November to 14 November at VVITU. After it has been launched in 1991, the original organizers decided to cease the fest for 2017. Vasireddy Ramesh Babu, convener of several previous iterations, during a press meet said that VVITU expressed its willingness to host the event, and was subsequently given the project. It was organized in collaboration with Acharya Nagarjuna University, Andhra Pradesh State Road Transport Corporation, Andhra Pradesh State Road Skill Corporation, and Andhra Pradesh Non-Resident Telugu Society. More than 12,000 children took part in the fest. The closing ceremony was presided by the Speaker and the Deputy Speaker of Andhra Pradesh Legislative Assembly, Kodela Siva Prasad Rao and Mandali Buddha Prasad respectively. On a closing note, Vasireddy said that VVITU would be hosting the fest every year from then.
