= Namburu railway station =

Railway station in Andhra Pradesh, India

Namburu
- Namburu Railway station south cabin view

General information
- Location: NH 16, Namburu, Guntur district Andhra Pradesh; India
- Coordinates: 16.3584°N 80.4957°E
- System: Indian Railway Station
- Owner: Government of India
- Operator: Indian Railways
- Line: Guntur–Krishna Canal section
- Tracks: 4

Construction
- Structure type: Standard (On ground)
- Parking: parking slot available
- Accessible: Disabled access

Other information
- Status: Active
- Station code: NBR
- Zone(s): South Central Railway
- Division(s): Guntur

Services
Preceding station	Indian Railways	Following station
Pedakakani Halt towards ?	Guntur–Krishna Canal section	Mangalagiri towards ?
Location
- Location within Andhra Pradesh Location within India

Namburu railway station (station code:NBR), is an E-category station in Guntur railway division of Indian Railways. It is situated on the Krishna Canal–Guntur section of South Central Railway zone.

== History ==
Between 1893 and 1896, 1,288 km (800 mi) of the East Coast State Railway, between Vijayawada and Cuttack was opened for traffic. The southern part of the West Coast State Railway (from Waltair to Vijayawada) was taken over by Madras Railway in 1901.

== See also ==
- List of railway stations in India
