= Venigandla =

- Village
- Interactive map of Venigandla
- Location in Andhra Pradesh, India
- Coordinates: 16.3514072°N 80.4689955°E
- Country: India
- State: Andhra Pradesh
- District: Guntur
- Mandal: Pedakakani

Government
  - Type: Panchayati raj
  - Body: Venigandla gram panchayat

Area
  - Total: 1,399 ha (3,460 acres)

Population (2011)
  - Total: 7,062
  - Density: 504.8/km^{2} (1,307/sq mi)

Languages
  - Official: Telugu
- Time zone: UTC+5:30 (IST)
- PIN: 522509
- Area code: +91–863
- Vehicle registration: AP

Venigandla is a village in the Guntur district of the Indian state of Andhra Pradesh. It is located in Pedakakani mandal of Guntur revenue division.

== Government and politics ==
Venigandla gram panchayat is the local self-government of the village. It is divided into wards and each ward is represented by a ward member. The ward members are headed by a Sarpanch. The village forms a part of Andhra Pradesh Capital Region and is under the jurisdiction of APCRDA.

== Education ==
As per the school information report for the academic year 2018–19, the village has a total of 7 schools. These include one private, one other type and 5 Zilla Parishad/Mandal Parishad schools.

== See also ==
- List of villages in Guntur district
