= Pedakakani =

- Village
- Interactive map of Pedakakani
- Location in Andhra Pradesh, India
- Coordinates: 16°20′24″N 80°29′27″E
- Country: India
- State: Andhra Pradesh
- District: Guntur
- Mandal: Pedakakani

Government
  - Type: Panchayati raj
  - Body: Pedakakani gram panchayat

Area
  - Total: 1,660 ha (4,100 acres)

Population (2011)
  - Total: 23,201
  - Density: 1,400/km^{2} (3,620/sq mi)

Languages
  - Official: Telugu
- Time zone: UTC+5:30 (IST)
- PIN: 522509
- Area code: +91–863
- Vehicle registration: AP

Pedakakani is a village in the Guntur district of the Indian state of Andhra Pradesh. It is located in Pedakakani Mandal of Guntur revenue division. Hindu shrine of Shiva, Sri Bhramaramba Malleswara Swamy Temple is located in the village.

== Geography ==
Pedakakani is located at 16°20′24″N 80°29′27″E and is spread over an area of 16.80 km^{2} (6.49 sq mi).

== Demographics ==
As of 2011 Census of India, Pedakakani had a population of 23,201. The total population constitute, 11,315 males and 11,886 females —a sex ratio of 1051 females per 1000 males. 2,517 children are in the age group of 0–6 years, of which 1,285 are boys and 1,232 are girls etc. —a ratio of 959 per 1000. The average literacy rate stands at 70.05% with 14,489 literates, significantly higher than the state average of 67.41%.

== Government and politics ==
Pedakakani gram panchayat is the local self-government of the village. It is divided into wards and each ward is represented by a ward member. The ward members are headed by a Sarpanch. The village forms a part of Andhra Pradesh Capital Region and is under the jurisdiction of APCRDA.

== Culture ==
Pedakakani is united with all major cultures. Ancient Sri Malleswara Swami vari Devastanam, Baji Baba Darga, Kakani Thota is located here. Also Parantallamma temple, Sri pothuluri veerabrhemndra swamy temple is located here.

== Transport ==
National Highway 16, a part of Golden Quadrilateral passes through the village. APSRTC operates city buses to the village from NTR bus station of Guntur. Pedakakani Halt railway station is an F–category station on Guntur–Krishna Canal sectionis administered under Guntur railway division of South Central Railway zone.

== Education ==
As per the school information report for the academic year 2018–19, the village has a total of 21 schools. These include 12 Zilla Parishad/Mandal Parishad, st.Joseph English medium school( CBSE)&one other type of school and 8 private schools.

== See also ==
- List of villages in Guntur district
