= Pedakakani mandal =

- Mandal
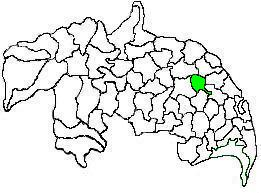
- Mandal map of Guntur district showing Pedakakani mandal (in green)
- Interactive Map Outlining mandal
- Location in Andhra Pradesh, India
- Coordinates: 16°20′24″N 80°29′27″E
- Country: India
- State: Andhra Pradesh
- District: Guntur
- Headquarters: Pedakakani

Government
  - Body: Mandal Parishad
  - Tehsildar: SK. Ismail

Area
  - Total: 116.46 km^{2} (44.97 sq mi)

Population (2011)
  - Total: 73,689
  - Density: 632.74/km^{2} (1,638.8/sq mi)

Languages
  - Official: Telugu
- Time zone: UTC+5:30 (IST)
- Vehicle registration: AP

Pedakakani mandal is one of the 18 mandals in Guntur district of the Indian state of Andhra Pradesh. It is under the administration of Guntur Revenue Division and the headquarters are located at Pedakakani. The mandal is bounded by Tadikonda, Mangalagiri, Duggirala, Tenali, Chebrole and Guntur mandals.

== Administration ==
The mandal also forms a part of the Andhra Pradesh Capital Region under the jurisdiction of APCRDA. It is under the control of a tahsildar and the present tahsildar is SK.Ismail. Pedakakani mandal is one of the 3 mandals under Ponnur (Assembly constituency), which in turn represents Guntur (Lok Sabha constituency) of Andhra Pradesh.

== Towns and villages ==
Pedakakani is the most populated village and Devarayabhotlapalem is the least populated settlement in the mandal. As of 2011 census, the mandal has 11 villages.

The settlements in the mandal are listed below:

1. Agatha Varappadu
2. Anumarlapudi
3. Devarayabhotlapalem
4. Gollamudi
5. Koppuravuru
6. Namburu
7. Pedakakani
8. Takkellapadu
9. Tangellamudi
10. Uppalapadu
11. Venigandla

== Education ==
The mandal plays a major role in education for the rural students of the nearby villages. The primary and secondary school education is imparted by government, aided and private schools, under the School Education Department of the state. As per the school information report for the academic year 2015–16, the mandal has more than 8,943 students enrolled in over 66 schools.

== See also ==
- List of mandals in Andhra Pradesh
- Villages in Pedakakani mandal
