= Bheema lift irrigation project =

Canal project located in Telangana, India

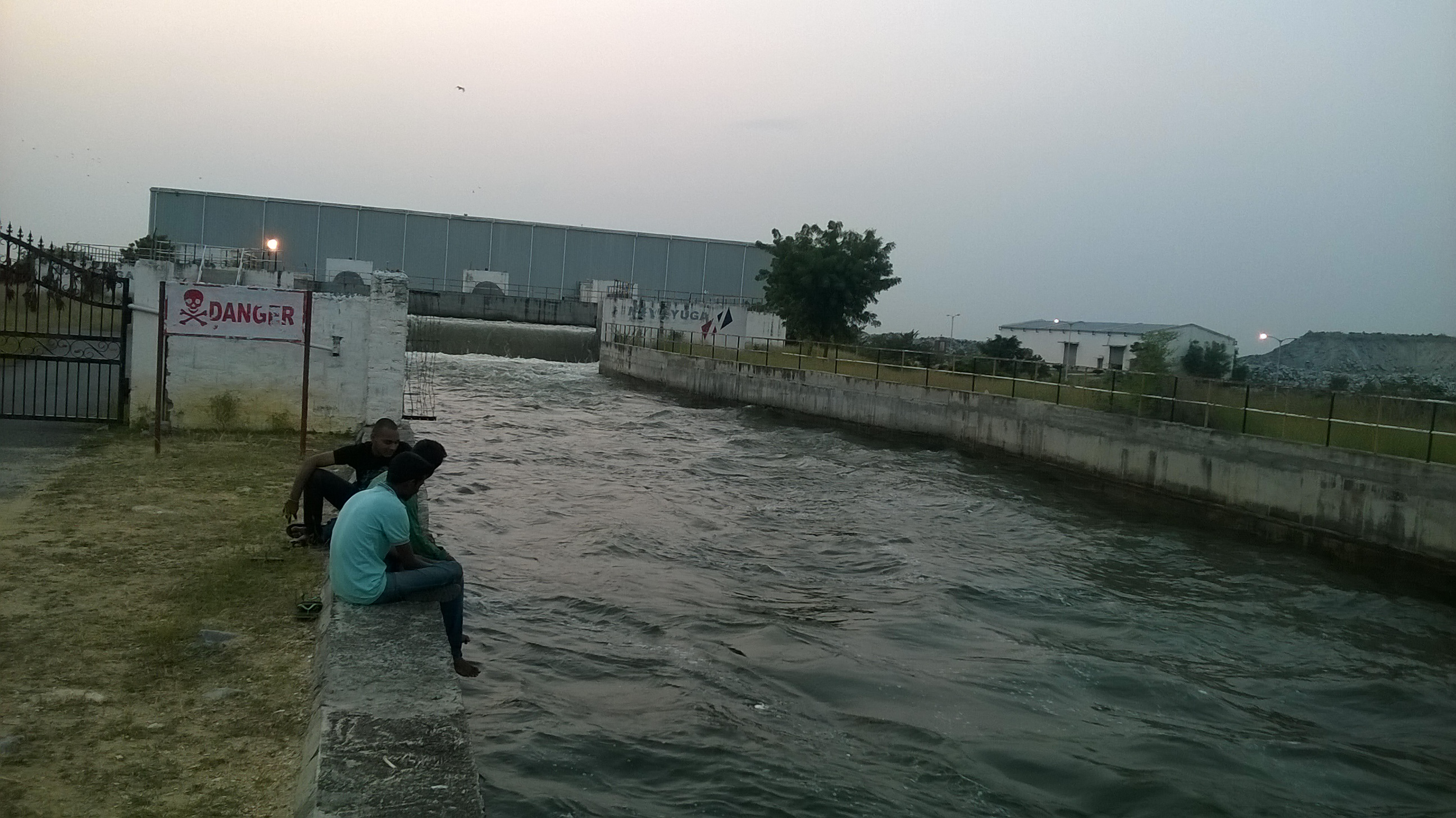

Bheema lift irrigation project or Rajiv Bheema Project is a lift irrigation canal project located in Narayanpet district in Telangana, India. Water is lifted at Panchdev Pahad from the back waters of Jurala Dam. Under the same project, another lift canal originates separately from the Ramanpahad balancing reservoir ( 16°22′04″N 77°52′20″E ) under Jurala left bank to irrigate the uplands.

The River Bhima originating from Western Ghats at Bhima Shankar near Karjat village in Maharashtra State is a tributary of Krishna River. The length of Bhima River is 861.35 km (535 miles). The river Bhima has a total catchment area of 70613.70 km^{2} up to the confluence point with Krishna river. The catchment area of the proposed site near Sonna village is 53328 km^{2} and out of this 47760 km^{2} lies in Maharashtra State and remaining 5568 km^{2} lies in Karnataka State.

== The Project ==
The Bheema Lift irrigation project would irrigate over 203,000 acres (820 km^{2}), would benefit 180 villages that fall in Makthal, Atmakur, Wanaparthy, and Kollapur Taluks of Mahabubnagar District utilising 20 TMC (20 billion cubic feet (570,000,000 m^{3})) of water.

The scheme envisages construction of a Barrage across Bhima River near Sonna village of Afzalpur taluka in Gulbarga District to impound 89.65 M.Cum (3.16 TMC) of water. The total water allocation for the scheme is 6.00 TMC, out of which 5.63 TMC of water is earmarked for irrigation purposes, and a balance of 0.10 TMC of water for drinking and 0.27 TMC for industrial and other purposes. By utilizing 5.63 TMC it is proposed to irrigate 24,292 Ha of Culturable Command Area (CCA) and to benefit drought-prone taluka of Afzalpur of Gulbarga district.

=== Details of Proposals ===
The lifts are proposed at two points.

Lift I is from the Krishna river from the point near Panchadevpad (V) in Atmakur taluk to irrigate an extent of 111,000 acres (45,000 ha).

Lift II is from existing Ookachettivagu Project pondage near Ramanpad (V) in Wanaparthy Taluk to irrigate an extent of 92,000 acres (37,000 ha).

Benefitted Mandals: - The Mandals that would benefit under the project are Magnur, Makthal, Narva, Atmakur, Chinnachintakunta, Wanaparthy, Peddamandadi, Pebbair, Pangal, Veepanagandla, Kollapur, Kothakota, and Devarakadra of Mahabubnagar district.
