= Namburu =

- Village
- Interactive map of Namburu
- Location in Andhra Pradesh, India
- Coordinates: 16.36°N 80.52°E
- Country: India
- State: Andhra Pradesh
- District: Guntur
- Mandal: Pedakakani

Government
  - Type: Panchayati raj
  - Body: Namburu Gram panchayat

Area
  - Total: 3,013 ha (7,450 acres)

Population (2011)
  - Total: 19,676
  - Density: 653.0/km^{2} (1,691/sq mi)

Languages
  - Official: Telugu
- Time zone: UTC+5:30 (IST)
- PIN: 522508
- Area code: +91–863
- Vehicle registration: AP

Namburu is a village in the Guntur district of the Indian state of Andhra Pradesh. It is located in Pedakakani mandal of Guntur revenue division.

== Governance ==
Namburu Gram panchayat is the local self-government of the village. It is divided into wards and each ward is represented by a ward member. The village forms a part of Andhra Pradesh Capital Region and is under the jurisdiction of APCRDA.

== Transport ==
National Highway 16, a part of Golden Quadrilateral passes through the village. APSRTC operates city buses to the village from NTR bus station of Guntur. Namburu railway station is an E–category station on Guntur–Krishna Canal section of Guntur railway division under South Central Railway zone.

== Education ==
As per the school information report for the academic year 2018–19, the village has a total of 15 schools. These include 9 Zilla Parishad/Mandal Parishad and 6 private schools. Some of the major institutions are, Acharya Nagarjuna University, Vasireddy Venkatadri Institute of Technology, National Institute of Design Andhra Pradesh etc.

== See also ==
- List of villages in Guntur district
