= Rajiv Dummugudem Lift Irrigation Scheme =

Rajiv Dummugudem Lift Irrigation Scheme (abbreviated RDLIS) is a lift irrigation scheme under execution which are located near Dummugudem, Khammam district in Telangana, India. There are three lift irrigation schemes by names Rajiv Dummugudem lift irrigation scheme, Indirasagar Rudrammakota Dummugudem lift irrigation scheme and Dummugudem to Sagar tail pond canal project. Rajiv Dummugudem lift irrigation scheme starting at 17°54′05″N 80°52′45″E is planned to supply irrigation water for 200,000 acres in Khammam and Warangal districts drawing Godavari River water from the Dummugudem pond. Indira Dummugudem lift irrigation scheme starting at 17°33′49″N 81°14′49″E is planned to supply irrigation water for 200,000 acres in Khammam, Krishna and West Godavari districts drawing Godavari River water from the back waters of Polavaram reservoir.

As part of redesigning, Rajiv Dummugudem Lift Irrigation Scheme (RDLIS) has been merged with Indira Sagar Rudramkota Lift Irrigation Schemes (ISRLIS) and has been named as Sita Rama Lift Irrigation Project (SRLIP). Sitamma Sagar Barrage has also been planned to create pondage of 36.5 TMC, for lifting water in this irrigation scheme.

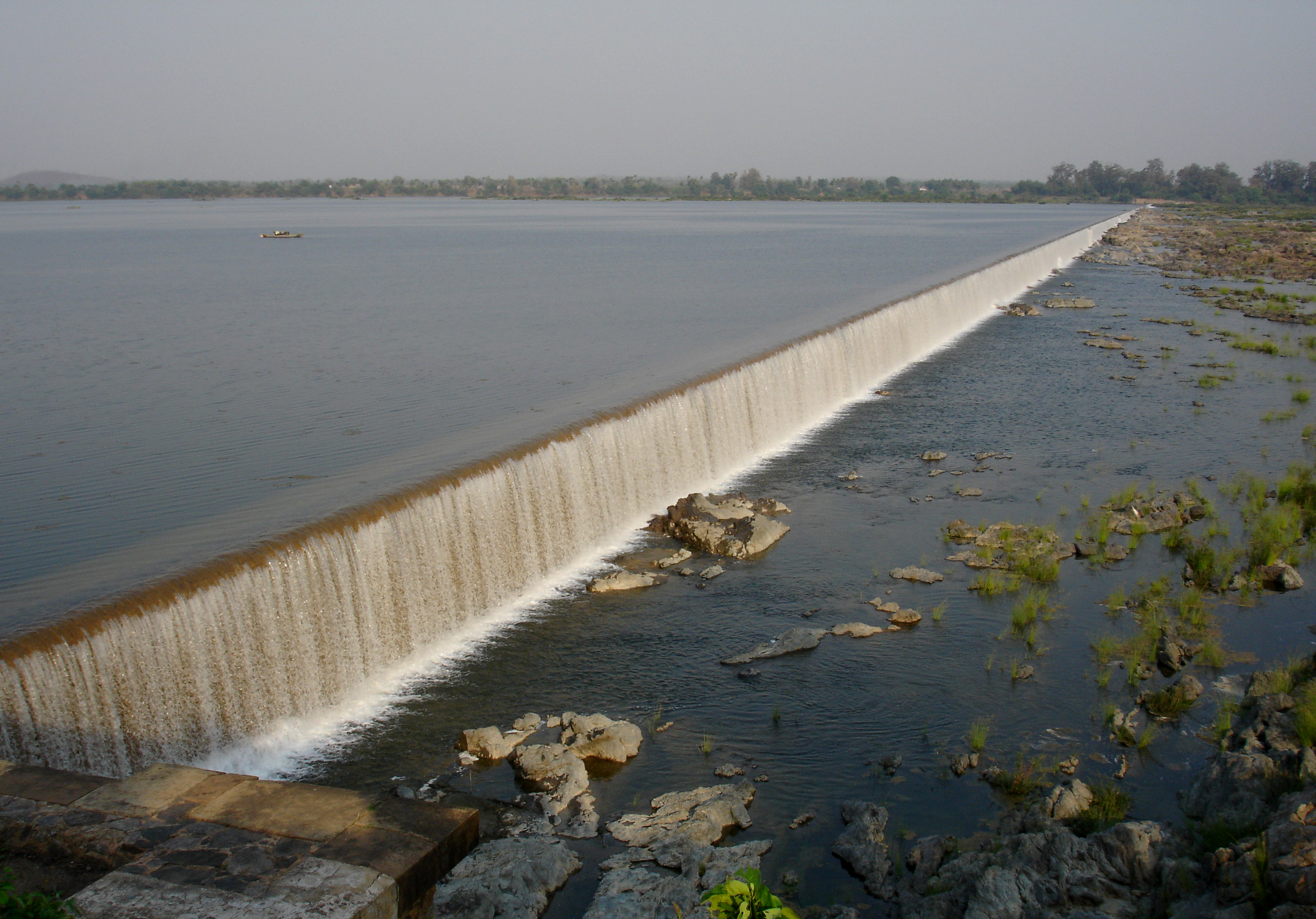
Dummugudem weir on Godavari

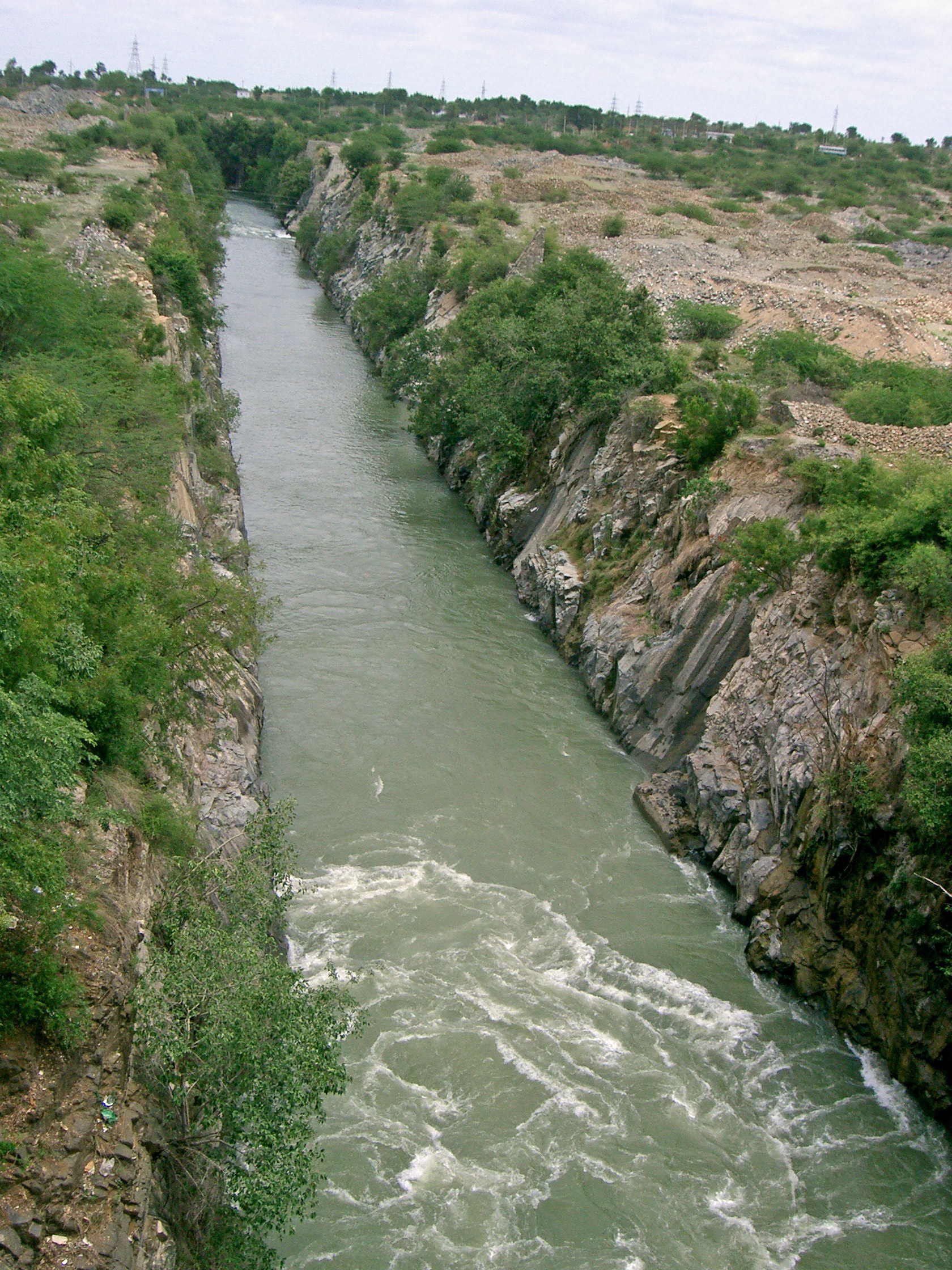
Nagarjuna Left Canal deep cut

== Existing weir ==
Dummugudem weir across the Godavari River was constructed nearly 150 years back by the famous British India engineer Sir Arthur Cotton who also constructed Dowleswaram and Prakasam barrages. The purpose of this weir was not for diverting the river water into canals but to use as cross over bridge during lean flow season. This weir has lost its relevance after construction of all weather road bridge near Bhadrachalam town to cross the river. A 24 MW hydroelectric station is constructed to use the level drop available across the Dummugudem weir.

== Jyothi Rao Pule Dummugudem Nagarjunasagar Sujala Sravanthi Project ==
This project is also called Dummugudem to Sagar tail pond lift canal project. The canal starts from Dummugudem pond at 17°57′43″N 80°51′31″E to Nagarjuna Sagar tail pond located across the Krishna River. This lift canal is an inter river basin transfer link by feeding Godavari river water from the Dummugudem pond to Krishna river basin to the extent of 165 tmcft. The total length of the canal is 244 km and the capacity of the canal is 22,000 cusecs to feed 165 tmcft water in three months duration of the monsoon season. Presently, the canal is planned to terminate at 16°47′19″N 79°19′03″E by feeding the water into the Halia river to reach the downstream Nagarjuna Sagar tail pond. The required pumping head is 128 meters for the elevation difference of 30 meters between Dummugudem pond (45 MSL) and Nagarjuna Sagar tail pond (75 MSL). Dummugudem pond to Nagarjuna Sagar tail pond link canal is entirely located in Telangana State and needs to be routed through high lands which necessitated more pumping head.

If this canal were to be terminated in to deep cut portion of Nagarjuna Sagar left canal near 16°44′41″N 79°16′59″E, water can reach by gravity to the Nagarjuna Sagar reservoir when its water level is at minimum draw down level of 155 metres (509 ft) MSL. It is more economical and purposeful to install a pump house drawing water from the deep cut portion of the canal to pump water up to Nagarjuna Sagar full reservoir level at 180 metres (591 ft) MSL with nearly 27 meters lift. Thus it is a viable project by eliminating the need of lifting water by 80 meters from tail pond to the Nagarjuna Sagar reservoir. This saved pumping head can be used to pump water from the Nagarjuna Sagar reservoir to Srisailam reservoir for supplying irrigation water to Kalwakurthi lift irrigation Scheme, Srisailam left bank canal, Dindi lift irrigation scheme, Palamuru lift canal, Nettampadu lift, Bhima lift, etc. located in Telangana with 100% water dependability for all the projects drawing water from the Krishna river.

== Alternate to Dummugudem to Nagarjuna Sagar tail pond link canal ==
An alternative link canal to Nagarjuna Sagar tail pond from Polavaram dam is also economically feasible to transfer Godavari water. This link canal passes entirely through the coastal Andhra region only.

== See also ==
- Dummugudem
