= Vasireddy Seethadevi =

Indian writer (1933–2007)

Vasireddy Seethadevi (15 December 1933 – 13 April 2007) was a Telugu writer, bureaucrat of Andhra Pradesh, India.

Seethadevi published forty-four novels of which eight were translations of novels from Hindi (4), Bengali (Navajyoti - playlet) and English (3).she also wrote nine short-story collections, three essay collections and five children's stories. Eleven of her notable works were translated into

Her novel Mareechika was banned by the state government of Andhra Pradesh. She waged a war against the government in the court, and got her book released. Mattimanishi (Son of Mother Earth) is one of her best novels and it was translated into fourteen Indian and foreign languages by the National Book Trust. Many universities awarded her honorary doctorates. Most of her novels were produced as films. She was the winner of Andhra Pradesh Sahithya Academy Award (literary award) five times.

Seethadevi worked as director of Jawahar Bala Bhavan, a government organisation for children. She was member of Cine Censor board between 1985 and 1991

== Writings ==
- Samatha (1967)
- Matti Manishi (2000)
- Adavi Malle (2003)
- Vuri Thradu (2003)
- Vennela Manduthondi (2003)
- Maro Dayyam Katha (2003)
- Kothi Kobbarikaya (2003)
- Rabandulu Ramachilakalu (2003)
- Mrugathrushna (2003)
- Saveri (2003)
- Urmila (2004)
- Thonikina Swapnam (2004)
- Malli Tellavarindi (2004)
- Bommarillu (2004)
- Ningi Nundi Nelaku (2006)
- Haseena (2006)
- Bandhitudu (2006)
- Pratheekaram (2006)
