= Muktyala Raja =

Zamindar of Muktyala, India (1917–1972)

Raja Vasireddy Ramagopala Krishna Maheswara Prasad
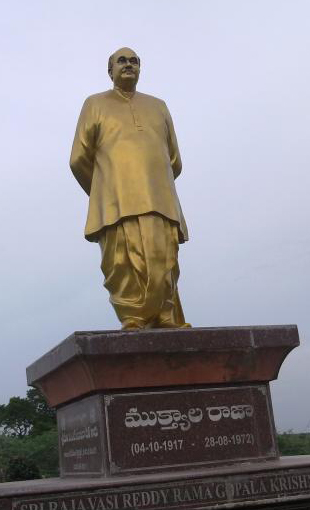
- Statue of Muktyala Raja at Nagarjuna Sagar project site.
- Born: 4 October 1917; Muktyala village, Krishna district, Andhra Pradesh, India.
- Died: 28 August 1972 (aged 54)
- Occupation: Zamindar of Muktyala
- Known for: Nagarjuna Sagar Dam

Raja Vasireddy Ramagopala Krishna Maheswara Prasad, popularly known as Muktyala Raja (4 October 1917 – 28 August 1972) was a zamindar of Muktyala, politician, and patron of Ayurveda. He was instrumental in the construction of the Nagarjuna Sagar Dam, the tallest masonry dam in the world, located across the Krishna River between Andhra Pradesh and Telangana. He also represented the Jaggayyapeta Constituency in the Andhra Legislature.

== Early life ==
Vasireddy Ramagopala Krishna Maheswara Prasad was born in the Muktyala village of Krishna District to Raja Vasireddy Chandramauleesvara Prasad Bahadur of the Muktyala Samasthanam and his wife in a Kamma family. He descends from Vasireddy Venkatadri Nayudu, was the brother-in-law of the Raja of Challapalli (Yarlagadda Sivarama Prasad), and the nephew of the Raja of Jayanthipuram (Vasireddy Durga Sadasiveswara Prasad). He married Yarlagadda Rajya Lakshmamma (Muktyala Rani), the sister of the Raja of Challapalli.

== Work ==
The Raja of Muktyala strived hard for the construction of the Pulichinthala Project across the Krishna River and put the project on track. Former Union Minister of Irrigation & Power Kanuri Lakshmana Rao said that Vasireddy suffered for leading the agitation for the Pulichinthala Project.

Vasireddy came to know that the Government of the Madras Presidency had made plans to divert Krishna River water to Madras by linking the Krishna and Pennar rivers. He embarked upon a tour of nine districts of Andhra Pradesh to collect the signatures of people in favour of the Nagarjuna Sagar Dam project. He traveled through the thick and inhospitable jungles near Macherla to visit the site of Nandikonda and formed a team of retired engineers at his own expense to make the project plans and designs. The government of Madras tried to scuttle his plans for which the Raja established the 'Krishna Farmers Welfare Society' and exerted pressure on the Government of India in favour of the Nagarjuna Sagar Dam. The Government of India instituted the Khosla Committee but the committee refused to visit the site on the excuse that there was no motorable road to Nandikonda. The Raja gathered villagers and volunteers from twenty five villages and built a road at his own expense. The Khosla committee visited the site and found it to be the most ideal location to build a gigantic dam across the river.

There were attempts to suppress the report of the Khosla committee. The Raja went to New Delhi and with the support of N. G. Ranga, Moturi Hanumantha Rao and Kotha Raghuramaiah resurrected the report, distributed it to important people and urged the Planning Commission (Government of India) to take cognizance.

Chandulal Trivedi, the Governor of the state of Andhra Pradesh urged the Prime Minister Jawaharlal Nehru to accept the report of the Khosla Committee. An announcement was made in 1954 for the construction of the project. The foundation stone was laid on 10 December 1955. The Raja of Muktyala donated fifty two lakh rupees and five thousand acres of land as a matching grant for the project construction.

The Raja of Muktyala was also a patron of Ayurveda. The Arsa Rasayana Sala of Muktyala, which contained unique Ayurveda literature in its libraries and published Sanskrit and Telugu Ayurvedic works like the Carucarya in 1957, functioned under his patronization. The patronage that the Rajas of Muktyala gave to the revival of Ayurveda has been described as "remarkable." Many notable classical musicians, poets, and scholars were also patronized at the Muktyala Samasthanam.
