= Krishna Canal Junction railway station =

Railway Station in Andhra Pradesh

Krishna Canal Junction
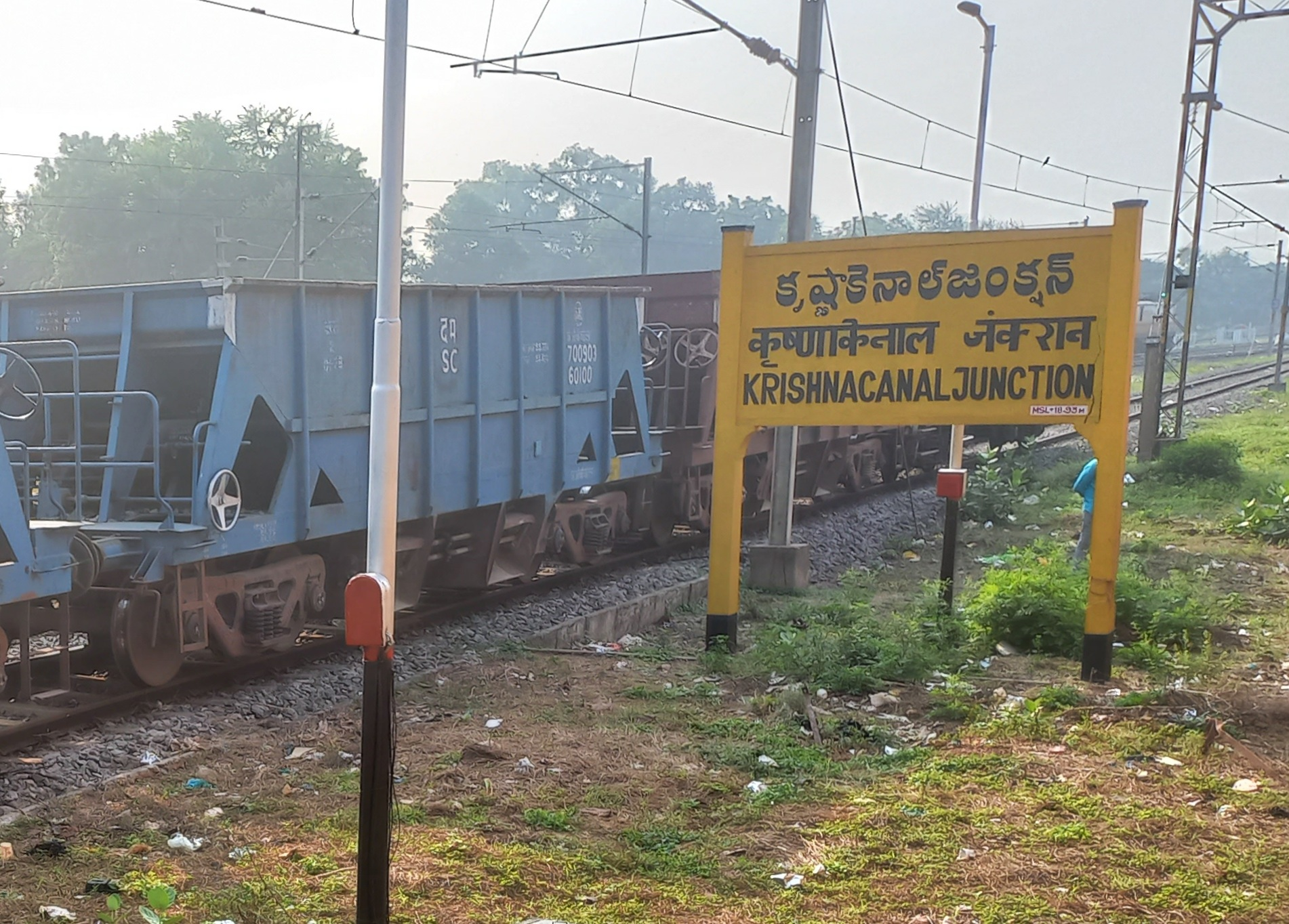
- Krishna Canal junction railway station

General information
- Location: Tadepalle, Greater Vijayawada, Guntur district, Andhra Pradesh; India
- Coordinates: 16°28′39″N 80°36′20″E
- System: Commuter, Inter-city and Regional rail station
- Owner: Indian Railways
- Operator: South Coast Railways
- Lines: Howrah–Chennai main line; New Delhi–Chennai main line; Guntur–Krishna Canal section
- Platforms: 6
- Tracks: 11 broad gauge

Construction
- Structure type: Standard (on ground)
- Parking: Yes
- Accessible: Available

Other information
- Status: Active
- Station code: KCC
- Zone(s): South Coast Railway zone
- Division(s): Vijayawada
- Classification: Non-Suburban Grade-3 (NSG-3)

History
- Opened: 1872
- Electrified: 1980–81

Services
Preceding station	Indian Railways	Following station
Kolanukonda towards ?	New Delhi–Chennai main line Vijayawada–Chennai section	Vijayawada towards ?
Kolanukonda towards ?	Howrah–Chennai main line Vijayawada–Chennai section	Vijayawada towards ?
Mangalagiri towards ?	Howrah–Chennai main line Guntur–Krishna Canal section	Vijayawada towards ?
Route map
Location
- Location within Andhra Pradesh Location within India
- Interactive map

Krishna Canal Junction railway station (station code:KCC) is an Indian Railways station in Tadepalle which is part of Mangalagiri Tadepalli Municipal Corporation and a satellite station of Vijayawada in Andhra Pradesh. It is administered by Vijayawada Railway Division of South Coast Railway zone and situated on New Delhi–Chennai, Howrah–Chennai main line. The station is the terminus for Guntur–Krishna Canal section. It is categorized as a Non-Suburban Grade-6 (NSG-6) station in the division. It is one of the 27 rural stations in the state to have Wi-Fi.

== History ==
Between 1893 and 1896, 1,288 km (800 mi) of the East Coast State Railway, between Vijayawada and Cuttack was opened for traffic. The southern part of the East Coast State Railway (from Waltair to Vijayawada) was taken over by Madras Railway in 1901.

As there was no railway bridge across the Krishna River, the trains from the South were terminated at this railway station and those from the North were terminated at Vijayawada railway station. The goods and passengers were transferred between the Vijayawada and Krishna Canal railway stations through barges.

== Classification ==
In terms of earnings and outward passengers handled, Krishna Canal is categorized as a Non-Suburban Grade-6 (NSG-6) railway station. Based on the re–categorization of Indian Railway stations for the period of 2017–18 and 2022–23, an NSG–6 category station earns nearly ₹1 crore and handles close to 1 million passengers.
