= Bhadrachalam revenue division =

Coordinates: 17.1415°N 79.6236°E

Bhadrachalam revenue division, భద్రాచలము రెవిన్యూ విభాగం
- Country: India
- State: Telangana
- District: Bhadradri Kothagudem

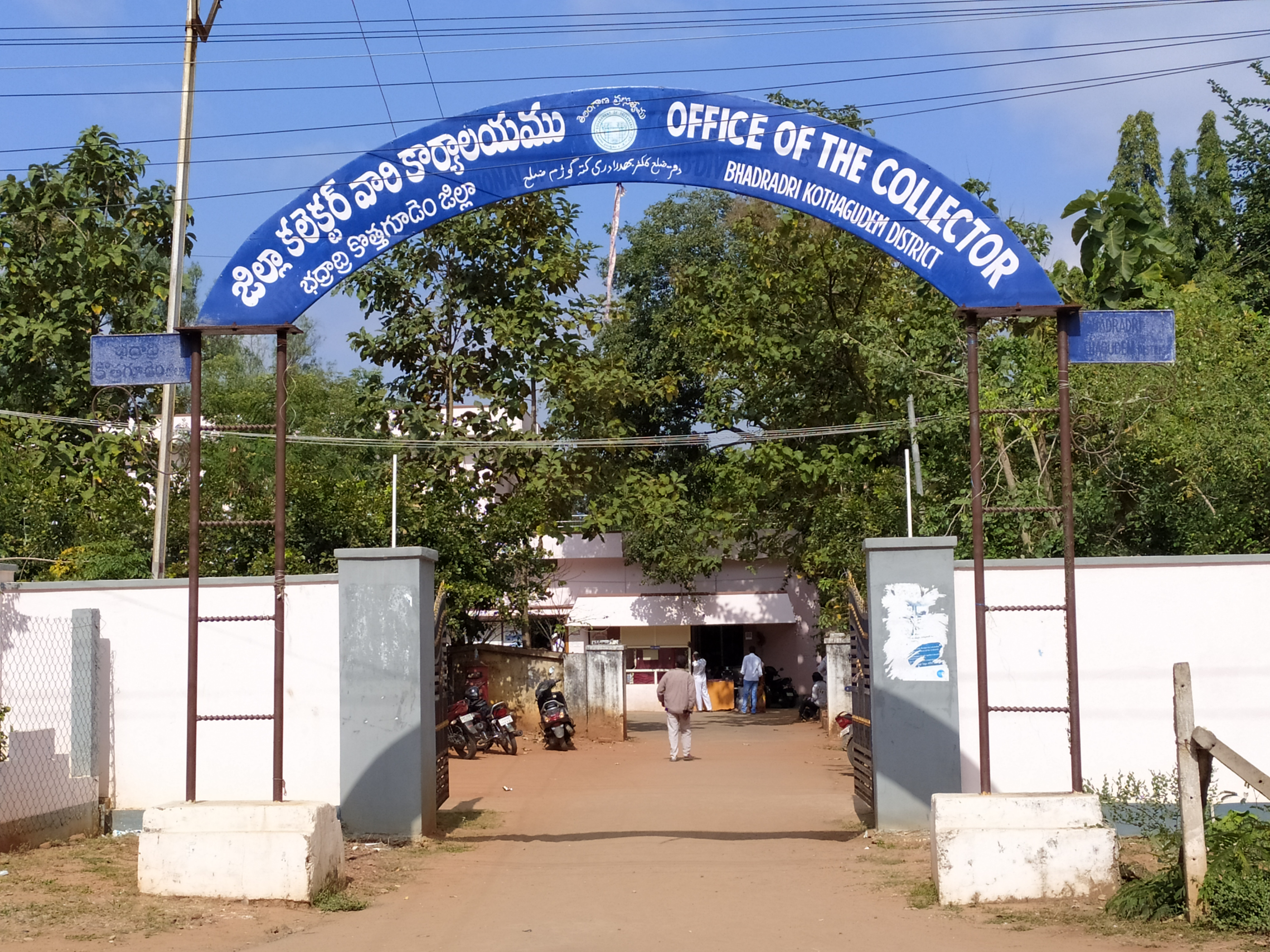
The gates of the Office of the Collectorate at Bhadradri Kothagudem district of Telangana

Bhadrachalam revenue division (or Bhadrachalam division) is an administrative division in the Bhadradri Kothagudem of the Indian state of Telangana. It is one of the 2 revenue divisions in the district which consists of 8 mandals under its administration. Bhadrachalam is the divisional headquarters of the division. The Bhadrachalam Revenue Division was originally part of East Godavari district of Andhra Pradesh up to 1959, after which it was merged through GO No. 553 on 17 Nov 1959 into Khammam district. Ashwaraopeta was also part of West Godavari district up to 1959. It was merged in Telangana region after the formation of Andhra Pradesh State with 29 states. In 2014, it was re-merged (excluding Bhadrachalam town) in Andhra Pradesh State with 13 districts, after the formation of Telangana state for the completion of Polavaram dam project.

== See also ==
- List of revenue divisions in Telangana
- List of mandals in Telangana
