= Jurala Project =

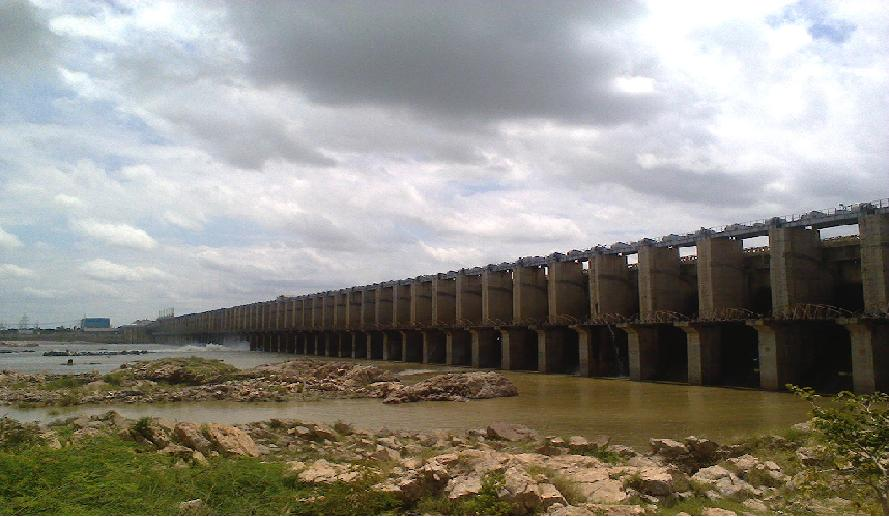
- Jurala Project

- Location within Telangana Location within India
- Official name: Priyadarshini Jurala Project
- Country: India
- Location: Jogulamba Gadwal, Telangana, India
- Coordinates: 16°20′15″N 77°42′16″E
- Purpose: Multi-purpose
- Status: Operational
- Opening date: 1995; 31 years ago
- Owner: Government of Telangana
- Operators: Irrigation & CAD Department, Government of Telangana

Dam and spillways
- Type of dam: Barrage
- Impounds: Krishna River
- Height: 40 meters
- Length: 1322 meters
- Width (base): 8.40 meters
- Spillways: 62
- Spillway type: Radial gate
- Spillway capacity: 35,396 cumecs

Reservoir
- Creates: Jurala Project
- Total capacity: 9.657 TMC
- Catchment area: 1,29,499 Sq km
- Surface area: 67.68 Sq km

Priyadarshini Jurala Hydroelectric Project
- Operator: Telangana Power Generation Corporation Limited
- Installed capacity: 234 MW
- Annual generation: 344.526MU (in 2024-25)

The Priyadarshini Jurala Project (PJP) or Jurala Project, is a dam on the Krishna River situated about 15 km from Gadwal, Jogulamba Gadwal district, Jurala Project is a dam on the Krishna River situated about 16 km from Atmakur, Wanaparthy district, Telangana, India.

== History ==
The project was completed in 1995.

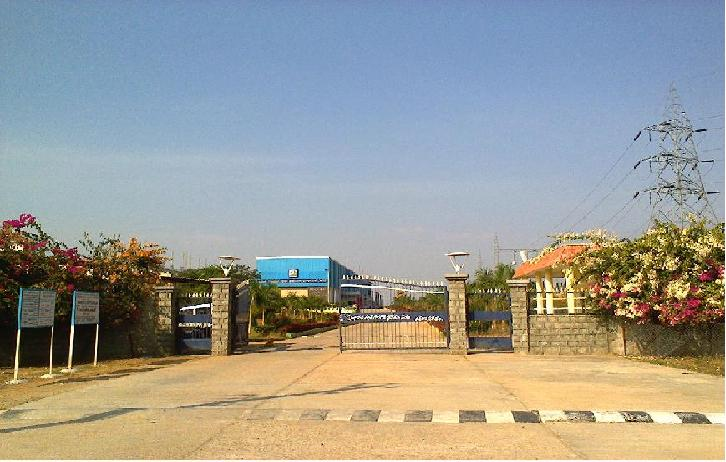
Jurala hydral project

== The project ==
The Jurala has a full reservoir level of 1,045 ft and has a full capacity of 11.94 TMC. but recently the project filled with huge silt so its capacity reduced less than 7 TMC. As of August 2013, the project has an estimated capacity of 9.74 TMC. The Jurala Project was completed in 1995.

The power projects constructed and maintained by Telangana State Power Generation Corporation Ltd. The project was designed by Shri. SRIPATHI SRINIVAS REDDY.

== Statistics ==
- Minimum draw down level (MDDL)(m): 314.86
- Nearest city: Gadwal, Telangana
- Gross storage capacity (MCM): 338.103189
- Live storage capacity (MCM): 192.27
- Design flood (cumec): 35396.05
- Type of spillway: Ogee
- Length of spillway (m): 927
- Type of dam: Earthen + masonry
- Type of spillway gates: Radial
- Purpose of dam: Multi-purpose, irrigation, hydroelectric
- Number of spillway gates: 79
- Year of completion: 1996
- Size of spillway gates (m*m): 12M x 8.516M
- Catchment area (Th ha): 12949.9
- Length of dam (m): 4534
- Land affected- Culturable (Th ha) 04.6555112
- Maximum height above foundation (m): 40
- Full reservoir level (m): 318.52

== See also ==
- List of dams and reservoirs in India
- Nagarjuna Sagar tail pond
