= Srisailam Left Bank Canal =

Irrigation project in Telangana, India

The Alimineti Madhava Reddy Srisailam Left Bank Canal (AMR-SLBC) Project is an irrigation project located in Nalgonda district in Telangana, India.

== History ==
This Project has two following alternatives

- Lift scheme from foreshore of Nagarjuna Sagar Reservoir: This scheme is completed by 2004 and 300,000 acres of land is under irrigation.
- Gravity scheme from foreshore of Srisailam reservoir, through two tunnels: This alternative to eliminate water pumping was taken up in 2004 and was scheduled for completion in 2010 but was delayed inordinately.

== Project ==
Water is fed from the Puttamgandi foreshore pump house located at 16°36′37″N 79°07′01″E in to the nearby Puttamgandi tank from Nagarjuna Sagar reservoir. The pump house has ultimate capacity of five pumps each of 600 cusecs pumping capacity. Water is supplied from the Puttamgandi tank by gravity to the entire irrigated area of the project via balancing reservoir called Akkampalli reservoir with 1.5 tmcft storage capacity. From Akkampalli reservoir, water is also pumped to the Hyderabad city for its water needs.

To eliminate the need of expensive water pumping and facilitate water flow by gravity to the Akkampalli reservoir, it is envisaged to bring water from Srisailam reservoir to the plains of Nalgonda through two tunnels of a total length of 50.75 km (31.53 mi). This scheme is known as Srisailam Left Bank Canal (SLBC) project.

== Expansion of Puttamgandi Tank ==
Puttamgandi Tank water storage can be enhanced significantly by enlarging its water area and water depth by constructing earth bunds taking advantage of nearby continuous hillocks on three sides of the tank. The enhanced water storage capacity would serve as 100% reliable and assured water source for water needs of Hyderabad city without depending on water from Srisailam and Nagarjuna Sagar reservoirs during drought years.
