= Acharya Nagarjuna University =

State university in Andhra Pradesh, India

- Emblem of Acharya Nagarjuna University
- Motto: Satye sarvaṃ pratiṣṭhitam (from the Șānti Parva of the Mahābhārata, [Mbh 12.156.5d])
- Motto in English: "Everything is established in truth."
- Type: Public
- Established: 1976; 50 years ago
- Affiliations: UGC
- Chancellor: Governor of Andhra Pradesh
- Vice-Chancellor: V. S. R. Samantapudi
- Location: Guntur, Andhra Pradesh, India; 16°22′31.16″N 80°31′42.9″E
- Campus: Suburban
- Website: www.nagarjunauniversity.ac.in

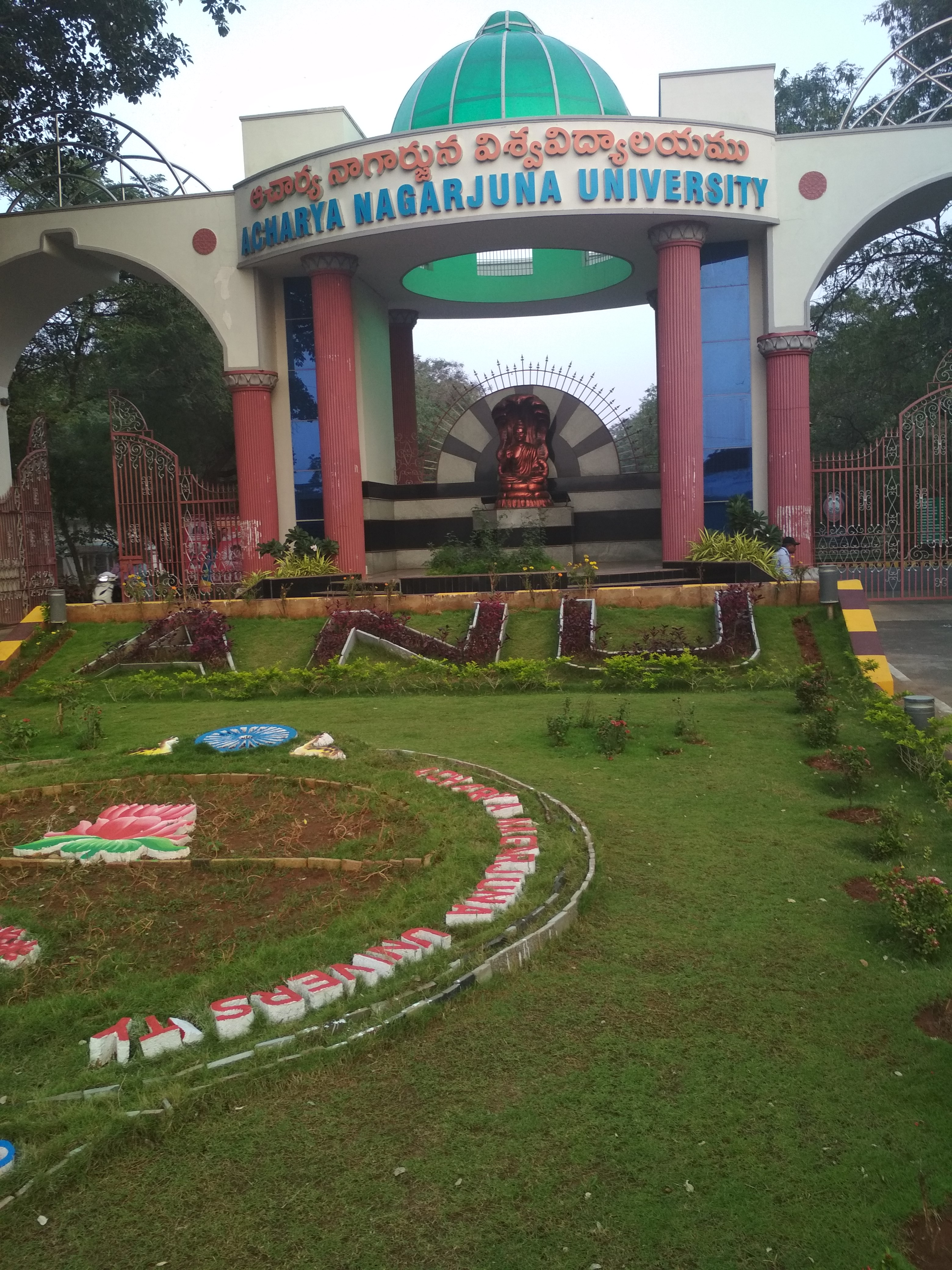
Entrance of Acharya Nagarjuna University

Acharya Nagarjuna University (IAST: Ācārya Nāgārjuna Vișvavidyālaya) is a state university in Namburu, Guntur district, Andhra Pradesh, India.

== History ==
The university was established as Nagarjuna University by Act 43 of 1976 of A. P. State Legislature and Governed by Act 4 of 1991 covering 6 Universities of the State. It was inaugurated on 11 September 1976 by then President of India, Sri Fakhruddin Ali Ahmed. It was renamed Acharya Nagarjuna University through the A.P. Universities (Amendment) Ordinance, 2004, promulgated by the Governor of Andhra Pradesh. In 1976, Andhra University started a Post-Graduate Centre in Maddi called Bala Tripura Sundaramma Polytechnic, Nallapadu, Guntur District of Andhra Pradesh, as an Extension Center to cater to the needs of higher education of the people of this region.

== Organisation and administration ==
=== Vice chancellors ===
The university's past vice chancellors:

1. V. Balaiah (19-8-1976 to 19-8-1979)
2. B. Sarveswara Rao (20-8-1979 to 08-02-1981)
3. B. Swami (09-02-1981 to 09-8-1981)
4. D. Bhaskara Reddy (10-8-1981 to 30-11-1982)
5. K. Raja Ram Mohana Rao (30-11-1982 to 30-5-1986)
6. G. J. V. Jagannadha Raju (30-5-1986 to 15-8-1988)
7. D. Ramakotaiah (15-8-1988 to 15-8-1991)
8. K. Penchalaiah (I/C), (15-8-1991 to 20-12-1991)
9. Y. C. Simhadri (20-12-1991 to 23-01-1995)
10. S. V. J. Lakshman (23-01-1995 to 16-11-1997)
11. P. Ramakanth Reddy (I/C), (16-11-1997 to 23-9-1998)
12. C. V. Raghavulu (24-9-1998 to 11-10-2001)
13. D. Vijayanarayana Reddy (12-10-2001 to 30-11-2001)
14. Chandrakanth Kokate FAC (01-12-2001 to 28-4-2002)
15. L. Venugopal Reddy (29-4-2002 to 5-5-2005)
16. V. Balamohanadas (6-5-2005 to 3-5-2008)
17. Y. R. Haragopal Reddy (14-08-2008 to 19-06-2011)
18. K. V. Rao (20-06-2011 to 18-04-2015)
19. K. R. S. Sambasiva Rao (19-04-2015 to 11-08-2015)
20. B. Udaya Lakshmi (12-08-2015 to 03-12-2015)
21. V. S. S. Kumar (04-12-2015 to 13-01-2016)
22. A. Rajendra Prasad (14-01-2016 to 12-01-2019)
23. A. Rajendra Prasad (I/C), (12-01-2016 to 13-01-2019)
24. K. Ramji (I/C), (14-01-2019 to 03-11-2019)
25. Patteti Rajasekhar (FAC) (04-11-2019 to 26-09-2022)
26. Patteti Rajasekhar (27-09-2022 to 17-07-2024)
27. Kancharla Gangadhara Rao (I/C) (18-07-2024 to 08-10-2025)
28. Venkata Satyanarayana Raju Samantapudi (09-10-2025 to Incumbent)

=== University College of Engineering and Technology ===
A new college for engineering and technology was established at the main campus of the university in 2009. This is one of many engineering colleges in the Guntur region, but it has the distinction of being the first to be managed entirely by the government. AICTE has visited the campus and completed the inspection to award grants and other recognition purposes to assess if it meets the minimum criteria.

=== Ranking ===
University and college rankings

Pharmacy – India
- NIRF (2024): 63

The College of Pharmaceutical Sciences was ranked 63 by National Institutional Ranking Framework (NIRF) pharmacy ranking 2024.

== See also ==
- List of state universities in India
