= Guntur–Krishna Canal section =

Railway line in Andhra Pradesh, India

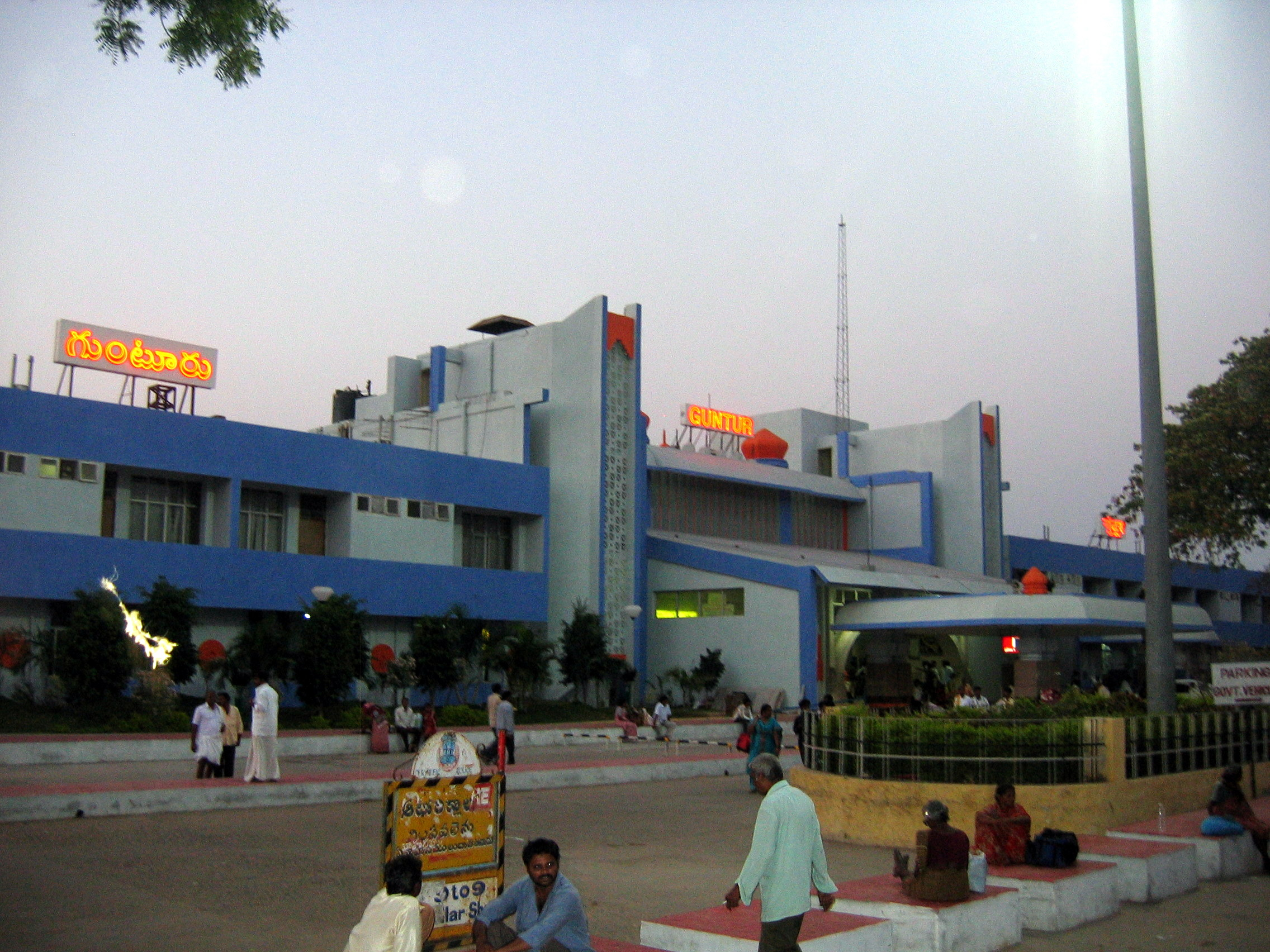
- Guntur Junction the starting point of Guntur–Krishna Canal section

Overview
- Status: Operational
- Owner: Indian Railways
- Locale: Andhra Pradesh
- Termini: Krishna Canal; Guntur

Service
- Operator(s): South Coast Railway

History
- Opened: 1966; 60 years ago

Technical
- Line length: 25.36 km (15.76 mi)
- Number of tracks: 2
- Track gauge: 5 ft 6 in (1,676 mm) broad gauge
- Electrification: Yes
- Operating speed: 110 km/h (68 mph)

The Guntur–Krishna Canal section is a section of Indian Railways. It connects Krishna Canal with Guntur and further, it also connects Howrah–Chennai main line at Krishna Canal, Guntur–Macherla section, Guntur–Tenali section, Tenali–Macherla sections at Guntur Junction.

== History ==
Vijayawada to Guntur broad-gauge section was opened in 1966.

== Jurisdiction ==
It is an electrified double-track railway having a length of 25.36 km (15.76 mi).
