= Vykuntapuram barrage =

Dam in Andhra Pradesh, India

Coordinates: 16°35′25″N 80°24′13″E

Vykuntapuram Barrage is an Indian barrage and water storage project. It is under construction on Krishna River 23 kilometers upstream of existing Prakasam Barrage with FRL 25M. It is designed to store 10 TMC of flood water coming from the Vyra and Munneru rivers. The backwater of this dam will extend beyond Pokkunuru to the toe of Pulichintala dam. Andhra Pradesh Chief Minister Nara chandrababu Naidu laid the foundation stone for this project on 13 February 2019.

== Features ==
Vykuntapuram Barrage features include:

| Feature | Value |
|---|---|
| Storage capacity (in TMC) | 10 TMC |
| River Basin | Krishna River |
| Purpose | Irrigation and water supply |
| Length of Barrage | 1187.5 m |
| Length of Earth Bund | 1807.5 m |
| Pond level (m) | + 25 m (MSL) |
| Number under sluice /bays | 12 Nos |
| Width of Under sluices/bays | 15 × 8 m |
| Crest Level | + 17 m (MSL) |
| Number of Barrage Bays | 56 Nos |
| Width of Barrage Bays | 15 × 7 m |
| Crest Level | + 18 m (MSL) |

== Godavari Penna River link ==
To stabilize the existing irrigated area under Nagarjuna sagar right canal, a new lift project construction was started. The project was to provide five step pumping stages and a canal to transfer 7,000 cusecs of Godavari water from Prakasam barrage back waters into the canal near Nekarikallu. The first phase was expected to utilize 73 tmcft of Godavari water. Vykuntapuram Barrage backwaters stretch beyond Pokkunuru to the toe of Pulichinthala Project. The project's first stage was to build a pump house to lift water from Prakasam Barrage backwater into Vykuntapuram Barrage pond. The second lift stage moves water from Vykuntapuram Barrage pond to the existing K.L Rao sagar pulichintala Project. Later lift Stages carry water from K.L Rao Sagar to Nagarjuna sagar. A pressure main enables lifting water to Srisailam Project via the existing reversible turbine pump houses in Nagarjuna Sagar dam and its tail pond project. A gravity canal from Ibrahimpatnam to Vykuntapuram Barrage pond can deliver the Polavaram right main canal/ Budameru diversion canal waters directly into the Vykuntapuram barrage pond since Polavaram right main canal level is 33 m MSL at Ambapuram hill near Vijayawada.

Krishna River Projects Salient Features
| Project Name | FRL | | Creast Level | | MDDL | | Tail Race Level | | Power Generation | | Reservoir | Storage capacity in TMC | | |
| Project Name | FRL | | Creast Level | | MDDL | | Tail Race Level | | Capacity | Turbines | Area | Storage capacity in TMC | | |
| | m | Ft | m | Ft | m | Ft | m | Ft | MW | Type | km^{2} | Gross | Live | Dead |
|---|---|---|---|---|---|---|---|---|---|---|---|---|---|---|
| Srisailam Project | 269.75 | 885 | 252.98 | 830 | 214.88 | 705 | 163 | 535 | 1670 | Francis | 541.9 | 215.8 | 178.7 | 3.42 |
| Nagarjuna Sagar | 179.83 | 590 | 166.42 | 546 | 155.45 | 510 | 73.15 | 240 | 816 | Francis | 285 | 312 | 181 | |
| Nagarjuna Sagar Tail pond | 75 | 246 | | | | | 48.33 | 158.56 | 50 | Kaplan | | | | |
| Pulichinthala Project | 53.34 | 175 | 36.34 | 119.23 | | | 20 | 65.6 | 120 | Kaplan | 144 | 45.77 | 36.23 | 3.61 |
| Vykuntapuram Barrage | 25 | 82 | 17 | 55.77 | | | | | | | | 10 | | |
| Prakasam Barrage | 17.39 | 57.05 | 13.73 | 45.05 | | | | | | | 30 | 3.07 | | |

There is a proposal to link Nagarjuna Sagar Dam across the Krishna River and Somasila Dam across Penna River with 400 km canal as part of national river linking program. With help from the Indian Government, AP Govt can construct a new canal up to Somasila Dam as per DPR of Indian Rivers Inter-link program specifications. Thus the Godavari River water will travel up to Somasila Dam and then Swarnamukhi in Chittoor district via existing Somasila Swarnamukhi link canal. GoAP can also provide water to Tamil Nadu with this Godavari water and retained water in Krishna River (15 TMC allocation of Krishna water to Telugu Ganga) will be used for other projects in Rayalaseema region.

In the future, a large new dam named Palnadu Sagar across a hill range near Bollapalle with 700 TMC capacity reservoir is possible using of flood water of Krishna River and Godavari River diverted with this lift project. It will submerge nearly 300Sq KM of land at FRL 260m MSL.Palnadu Sagar spillway with Francis Turbine will take and release water into Nagarjuna Sagar right canal along with Hydroelectricity power generation. Flood water of Krishna River will be pumped to Palnadu Sagar. The water stored in Palnadu Sagar will be used for irrigation and drinking in drought years.
