= Pulichinthala Project =

Dam in Andhra Pradesh, India

Pulichintala Project
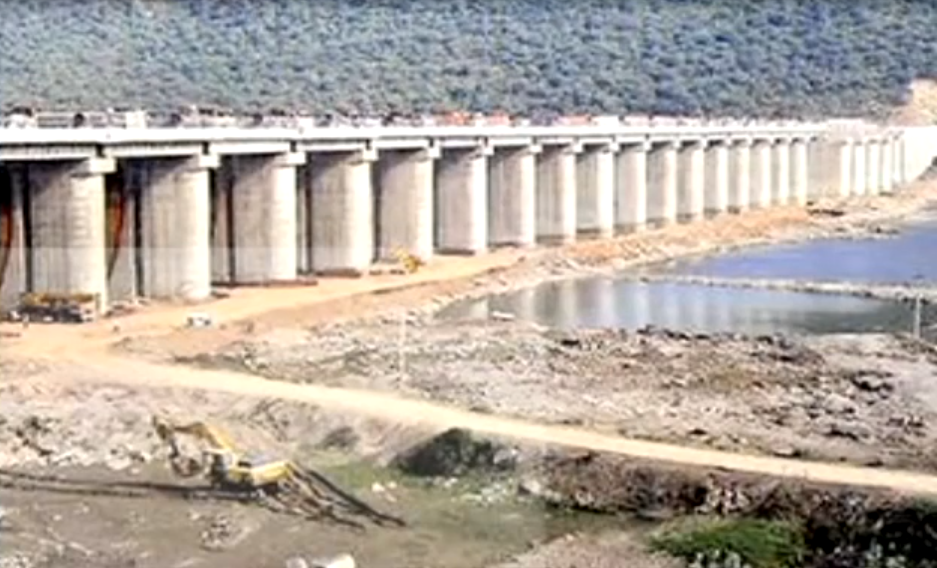
- Pulichinthala Dam

- Location within Andhra Pradesh
- Official name: K.L Rao Sagar
- Country: India
- Location: Pulichintala village, Bellamkonda, Palnadu district, Andhra Pradesh
- Coordinates: 16°45′15″N 80°03′24″E
- Purpose: Irrigation & Water supply
- Construction began: 08 August 2009
- Opening date: 7 December 2013
- Construction cost: 1850 crore rupees
- Owner: Government of Andhra Pradesh
- Operator: Andhra Pradesh

Dam and spillways
- Impounds: Krishna River
- Height: 42.24 m (138.6 ft)
- Length: 2,922 m (9,587 ft)
- Width (base): 31 m (102 ft)
- Spillway type: Controlled
- Spillway capacity: 10 lakh cusecs

Reservoir
- Creates: Pulichinthala Reservoir
- Total capacity: 46 Tmcft
- Active capacity: 36.23 Tmcft
- Catchment area: 240,732 km^{2}
- Surface area: 144 km^{2}

Power Station
- Operator: APGENCO
- Commission date: September 22, 2016
- Hydraulic head: 25 Meters
- Turbines: 4 × 30 MW Kaplan turbine
- Installed capacity: 120 MW
- Website irrigationap.cgg.gov.in/wrd/dashBoard

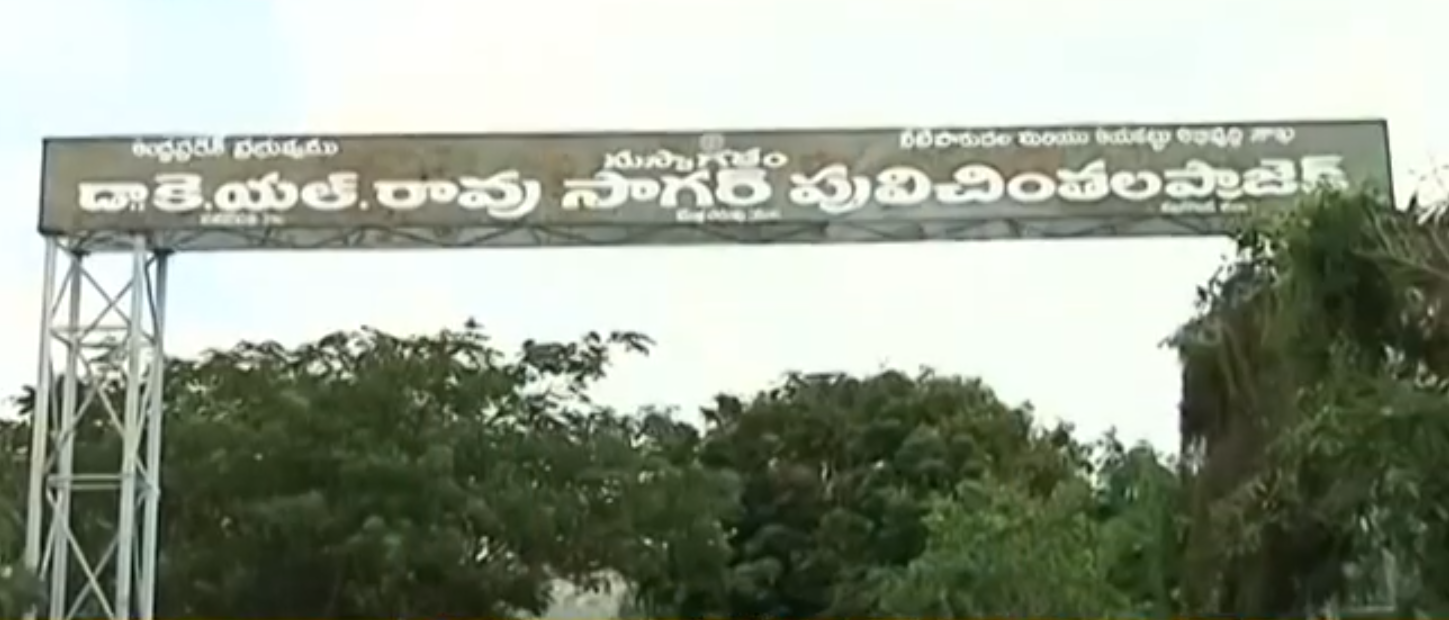
Project entrance

The Pulichintala Project is a multi-purpose water management project for irrigation, hydropower generation, and flood control in the state of Andhra Pradesh, India, named after the prominent civil engineer, Kanuri Lakshmana Rao. It is a crucial irrigation facility for farmers in four coastal districts: West Godavari, Krishna, Guntur, Palanadu, and Prakasam, covering over 13 lakh acres. It has 24 gates and a balancing reservoir with a capacity of 46 Tmcft at 175 feet (53 m) MSL full reservoir level (FRL).

== History ==
In 1911, British engineer Col. Ellis proposed an irrigation project upstream of the Prakasam Barrage. At the time, the British government showed little interest in the proposition. Later, It was the first project to start under the ambitious Jalayagnam program in the year 2005. Financial tie-up commenced in 2009.

On 7 December 2013, the project was ready for a trial run, and it started impounding water in August 2014. It was fully completed in September 2018. The total cost of the project exceeded Rs.1850 crores.

== Project ==
The irrigation facility is in the Pulichintala village, located in the Palnadu district near the Krishna River. It is between the Vykuntapuram barrage (near Amaravati) and the Nagarjuna Sagar dam. It has a 30 Tmcft live storage capacity to impound river floodwaters generated from the catchment area located downstream of Nagarjuna Sagar Tail Pond. The project reservoir provides a water supply to the downstream Prakasam Barrage that then can be sent out through the Pattiseema lift/Polavaram irrigation canal during monsoon months.

The Vellatur lift irrigation scheme (constructed near 16°42′44″N 80°00′29″E), irrigates 13,000 acres in the Nalgonda district. It draws water from the Pulichintala reservoir. The lift can pump water from 120 feet (37 m) MSL when the reservoir's gross storage is as low as 4 Tmcft. The proposed Yadadri Thermal Power Plant would also draw water from the reservoir.

== Godavari Penna River Linking ==
The Godavari Penna River linking project was constructed to stabilize the existing irrigated area under the Nagarjuna Sagar right canal. The new lift would have greenfield alignment, and its first phase consists of five-step ladder pumping stages that transfer 7,000 cusecs of Godavari River water from Prakasam Barrage to deliver 73 Tmcft of Godavari water into the Nagarjuna Sagar right canal near Nekarikallu.

With FRL 25M the newly created Vykuntapuram Barrage pond will have backwaters beyond Pokkunuru up to the toe of the Pulichinthala Project. It is more economical to construct the first stage pump house to lift water from the Prakasam Barrage backwater into the newly created Vykuntapuram Barrage pond and the second Lift stage from the Vykuntapuram Barrage pond to the existing K.L Rao Sagar Pulichintala Project and later lift Stages from K.L Rao Sagar to Nagarjuna Sagar right canal. It will shorten the length of this lift project canal, Pressure Main and fewer lift stages and also enable to lift of water up to Srisailam Project via the existing Reversible Reverse turbine pump houses in Nagarjuna Sagar Dam and its tail pond project. It is even more economical if the construction of a new gravity canal from Ibrahimpatnam to Vykuntapuram Barrage pond to deliver the Polavaram right main canal/ Budameru diversion canal waters directly into the Vykuntapuram barrage pond since Polavaram right main canal level is 33 m MSL at Ambapuram hill near Vijayawada.

A low-level, lift canal from the Krishna river located near 16°42′50″N 80°08′24″E at 20 metres (66 ft) MSL downstream of Pulichintala dam will be executed to feed Godavari water diverted from Polavaram Dam to some of the existing command area (situated below 60 m MSL) under Nagarjuna Sagar right bank canal to facilitate the extension of Nagarjuna Sagar right bank canal connecting Kandaleru feeder canal / Somasila Dam reservoir serving irrigation needs in Prakasam, Potti Sriramulu Nellore and Chittur districts including Chennai drinking water supply. A branch from this lift canal is also extended up to Pulichinthala dam (FRL 53.34 m MSL) to store Godavari water in Pulichintala reservoir during drought years and to irrigate lowlands along the Krishna river up to Pulichintala dam.

== See also ==
- Nagarjuna Sagar tail pond
