= 2024 Vijayawada floods =

Natural disaster in India

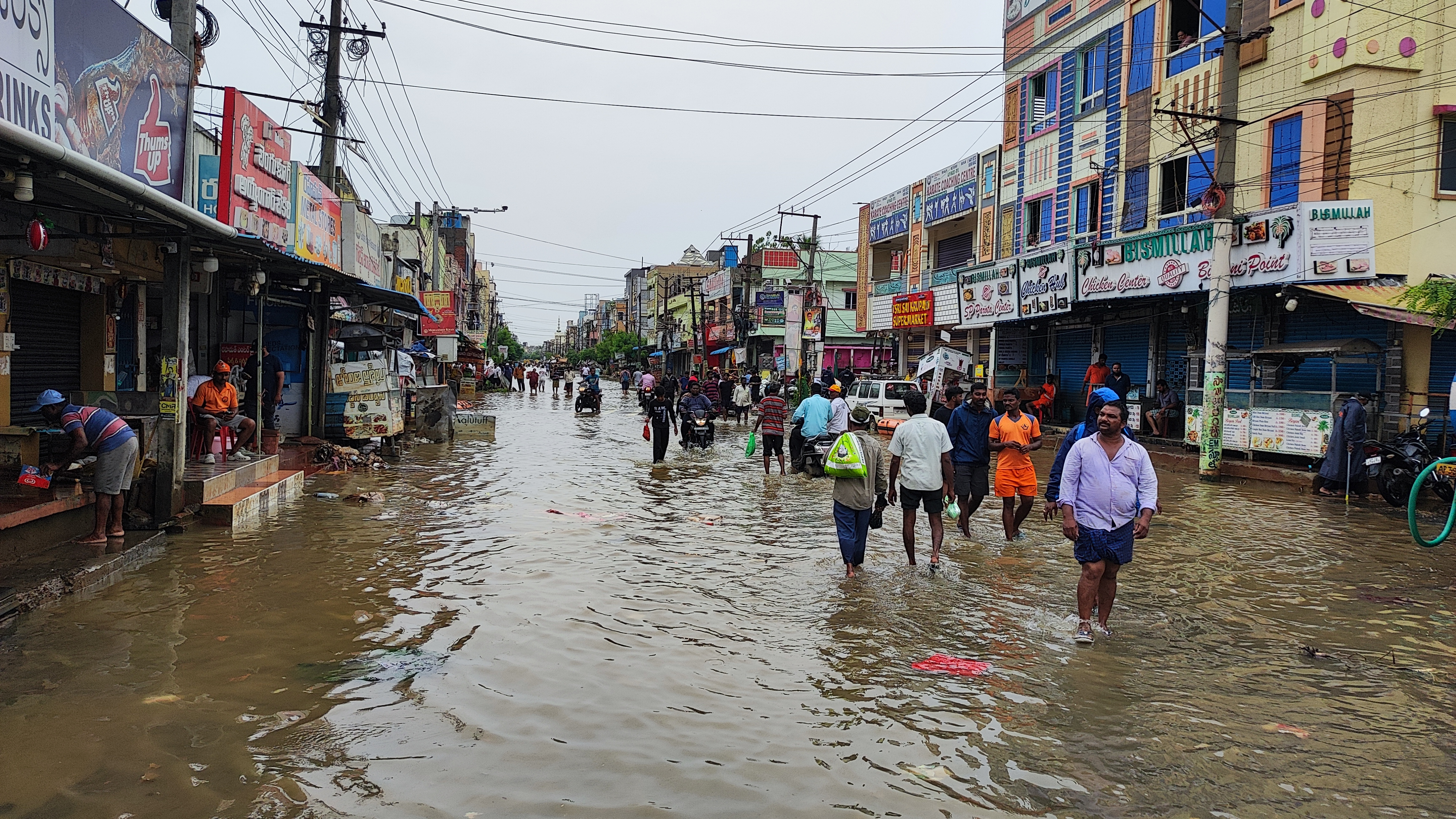
- Flood water near Ajit Singh Nagar on 8th September
- Date: 31 August 2024–9 September 2024
- Location: Vijayawada, Andhra Pradesh, India
- Cause: Heavy rains
- Deaths: 35

In early September 2024, Vijayawada, a city in Andhra Pradesh, India, experienced severe flooding triggered by exceptionally heavy rainfall that began on 31 August 2024. The floods resulted in at least 35 deaths in NTR district and significantly impacted approximately 270,000 people in Vijayawada alone. The disaster was characterized by over 29 cm (11 in) of rainfall in a single day, which overwhelmed the Krishna River and Budameru Rivulet. The flooding caused extensive damage to infrastructure, homes, and agricultural land. The extreme rainfall caused catastrophic flooding, severely damaging infrastructure, homes, and agricultural land. The flooding exposed critical issues with the city's flood management infrastructure and urban planning, highlighting the urgent need for improved measures to handle such extreme weather events.

== Background ==
The Budameru Rivulet, which flows through Vijayawada, plays a crucial role in draining the basin between the Godavari and Krishna Rivers into Kolleru Lake. Historically, this rivulet has been prone to overflowing, leading to the construction of a diversion canal designed to redirect its flow into the Krishna River from Velagaleru village, situated 15 km (9.3 mi) from the city. However, during the severe rainfall event in late August 2024, the rivulet was overwhelmed like never before. Torrential rains in the NTR district and neighboring Khammam district caused a significant increase in runoff, which dramatically surged the flow into Budameru. The Krishna River, already swollen from preceding rains, was unable to accommodate the additional inflows from Budameru, which reached an unprecedented 990 cubic metres (35,000 cu ft) per second, far surpassing the Budameru diversion canal's capacity of 200 cubic metres (7,000 cu ft) per second. This immense volume of water led to extensive flooding in Vijayawada, exacerbated by breaches in the Budameru Rivulet. The floodwaters breached several manmade barriers and inundated areas that had previously been safeguarded by the diversion canal. The canal, which had been designed to manage high flows, proved inadequate for handling the extreme conditions of this event. The flooding not only highlighted the limitations of existing flood control measures but also underscored the impact of urban encroachments on traditional floodplains, contributing to the widespread damage and displacement in the city.

== Impact ==
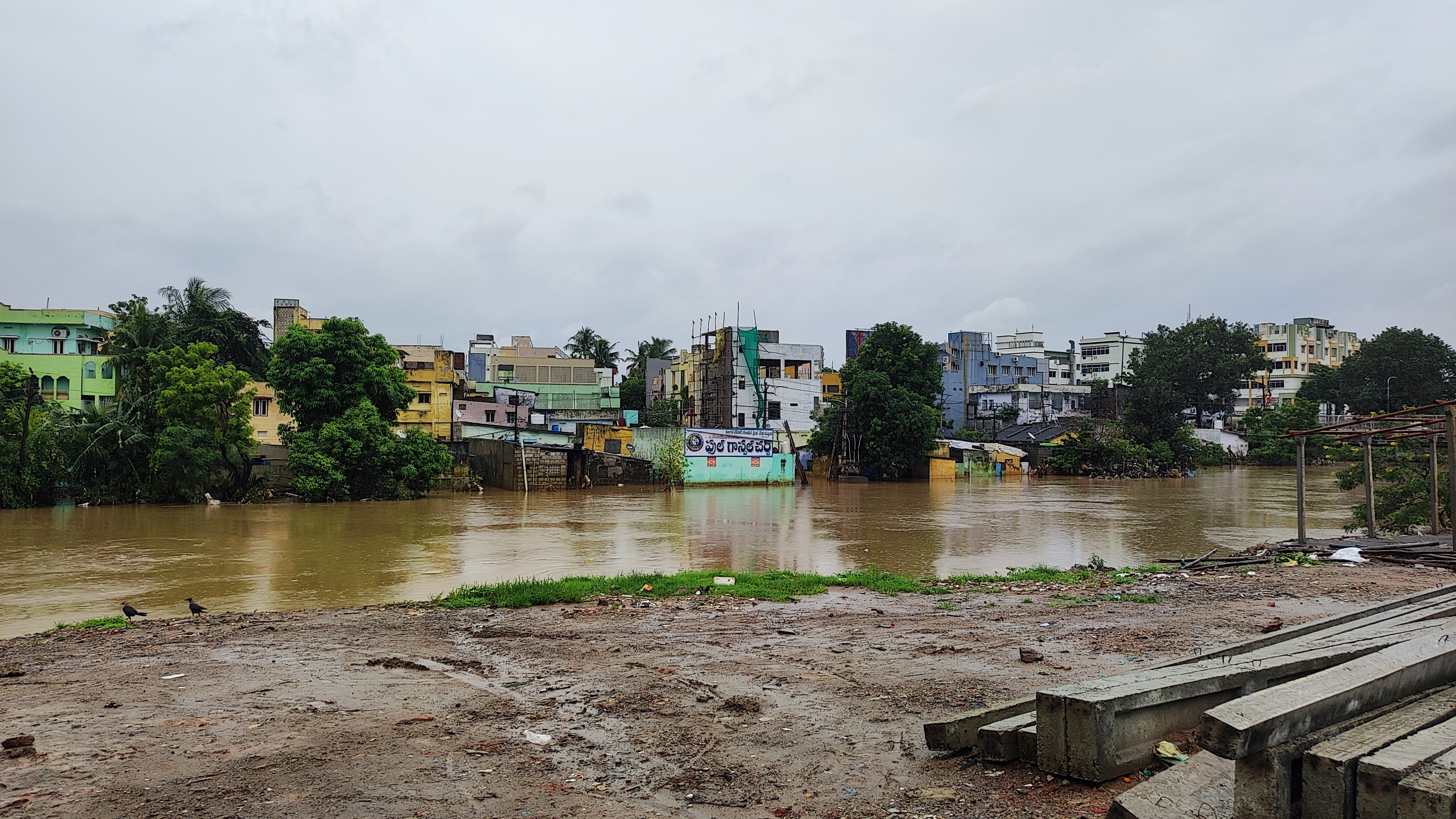
Budameru overflowing near Ayodhya Nagar

The recent floods in Vijayawada have exposed severe vulnerabilities related to encroachment on natural water bodies and inadequate flood management infrastructure. The deluge, which began on 31 August, significantly impacted more than half of Vijayawada, causing widespread disruption. The Budameru Rivulet, which normally glides through the city, overflowed violently due to extreme rainfall, exacerbated by the already swollen Krishna River. The river's inability to manage the additional inflows from Budameru. The floodwaters inundated residential areas, particularly affecting those built on the Budameru Rivulet's floodplains. Encroachment along the rivulet and its floodplains has obstructed natural water flow and flood management, worsening the impact of the floods. Key factors contributing to the disaster include the heavy rainfall, which exceeded expected levels, and climate change, which has led to increasingly severe weather events. Encroachments and poor urban planning have also played critical roles, blocking natural water pathways and aggravating the flooding.

The Krishna River also experienced unprecedented flooding, impacting Vijayawada and surrounding regions. Due to continuous heavy rainfall, the river saw record inflows, with the Prakasam Barrage discharging 33,000 cubic metres (1,180,000 cu ft) per second of water, the highest in its 70-year history. This massive release was necessary as the barrage reached its capacity, and all 70 gates were opened to manage the excess water. The inflows were intensified by torrential rains in the upstream regions, including the Pulichintala and Nagarjuna Sagar projects. The barrage's total capacity of 34,000 cubic metres (1,190,000 cu ft) per second was overwhelmed, leading to the temporary suspension of vehicle and pedestrian movement across the structure for safety reasons. The floods inundated low-lying residential areas in Vijayawada and several villages downstream, causing significant damage to infrastructure, homes and agricultural land. Historical data indicates that this flood event surpassed previous records, with only the 2009 and 1998 floods coming close in terms of discharge levels. The state government and irrigation officials took swift action to fortify vulnerable areas with sandbags and other materials to mitigate further damage. Despite these efforts, the floods led to widespread disruptions, including the cancellation of trains and the evacuation of thousands of residents. Relief operations were mobilized with the help of national agencies to address the emergency and assist affected communities.

=== Prakasam Barrage Boat Crash ===
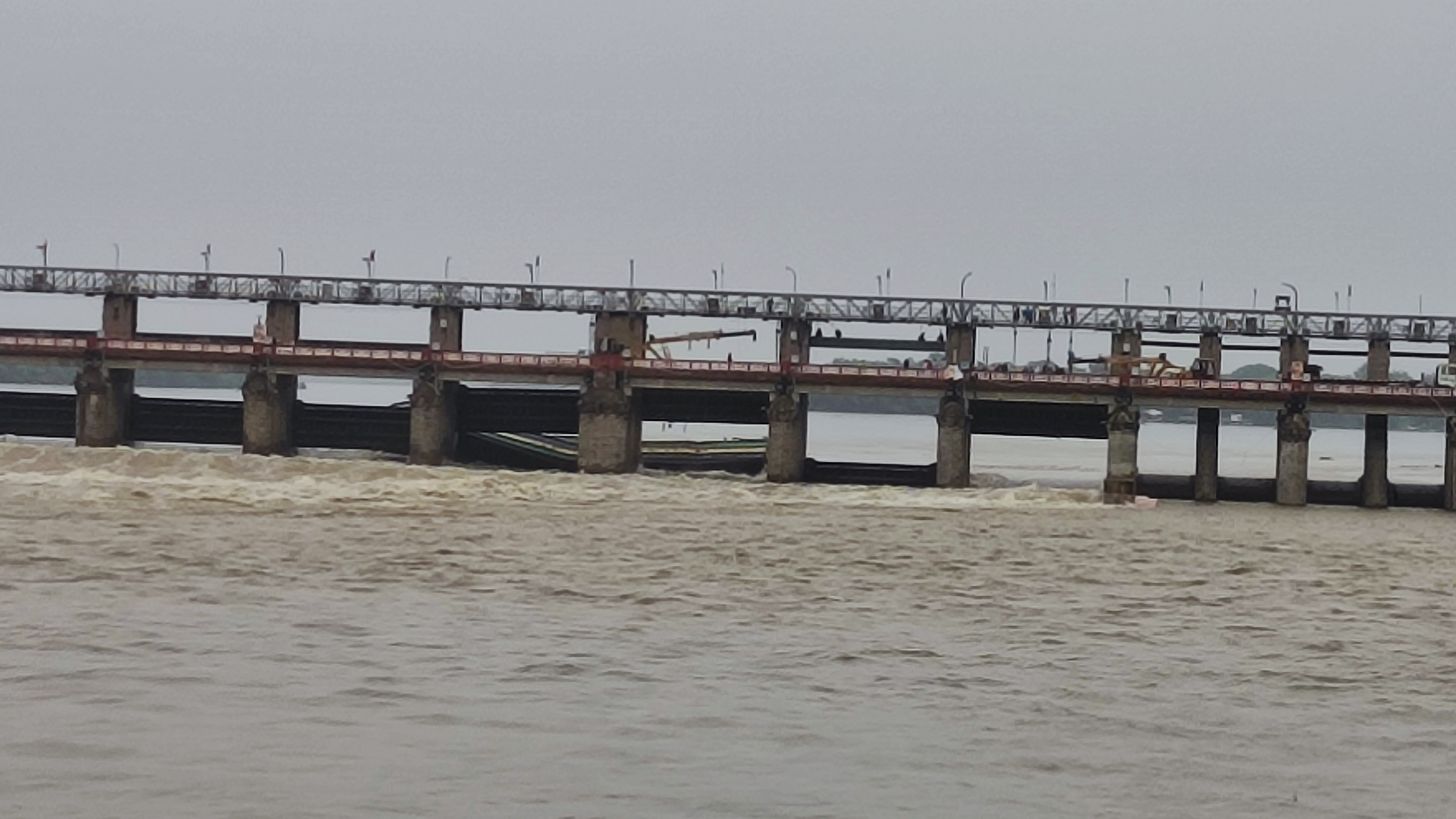
Prakasam barrage counterweight being repaired

On 1 September 2024, five boats drifted from upstream and collided with Gate No. 69 of the Prakasam Barrage, causing significant damage to its counterweight. The impact led to the counterweight breaking into two pieces, raising concerns about the barrage's safety. The boats, which were not claimed by any known parties, were found to be inadequately anchored, with some tied together with iron chains and others using weak ropes. This has led to suspicions of possible sabotage. Following the incident, the One Town police registered a case and arrested two individuals, Vakkalagadda Ushadri and Komati Ram Mohan, for their suspected involvement. Three special teams have been formed to investigate and identify the boat owners. Repair work on the damaged counterweight began immediately, with a metal box fixed as a temporary measure. Full repairs are expected to take an additional two to three days. Meanwhile, some gates were closed to remove additional boats that were obstructing floodwater flow. The investigation continues to determine the cause of the crash and ensure the barrage's safety.

== Aftermath ==
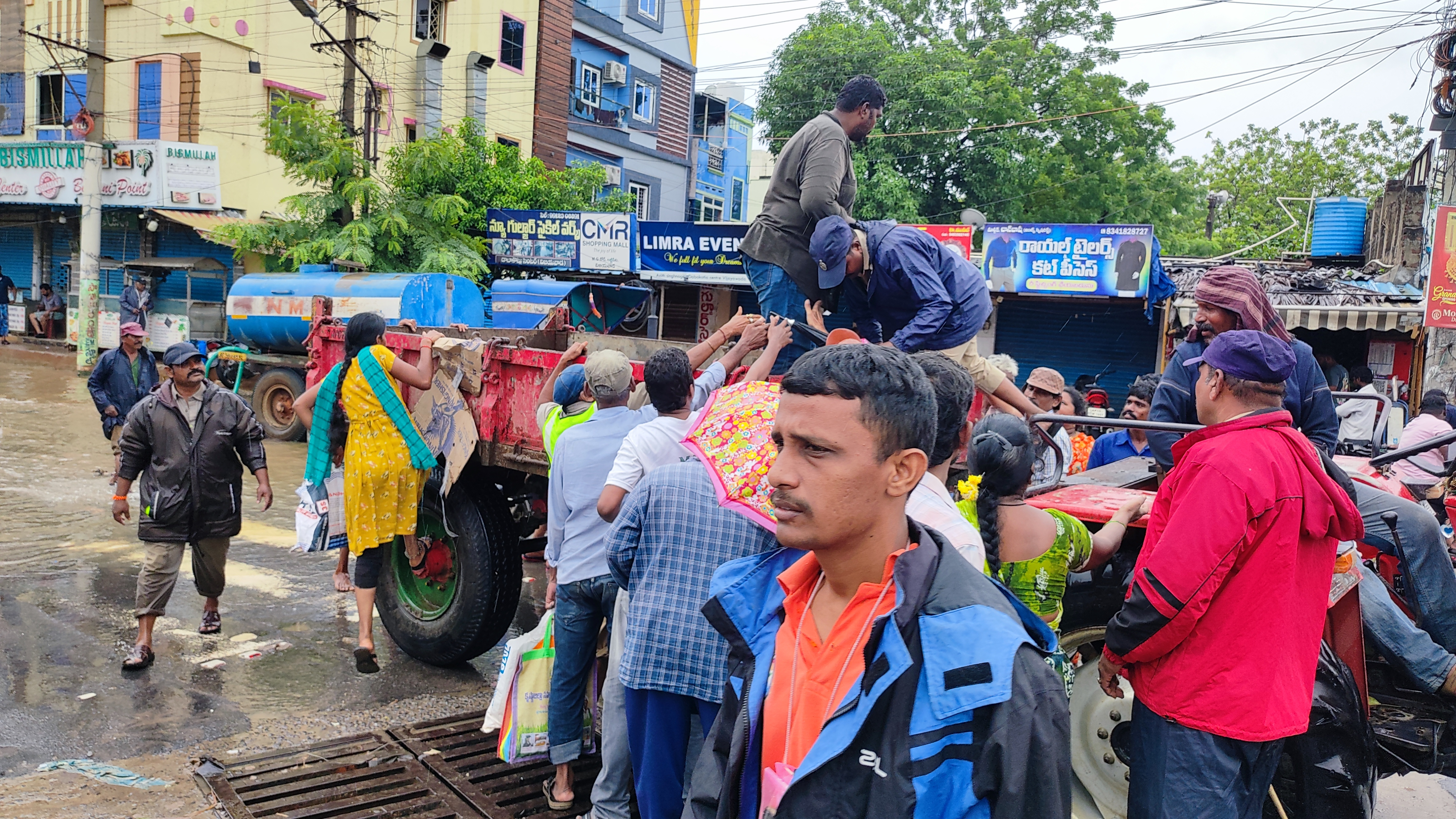
People rushing to get food and supplies from a distribution vehicle

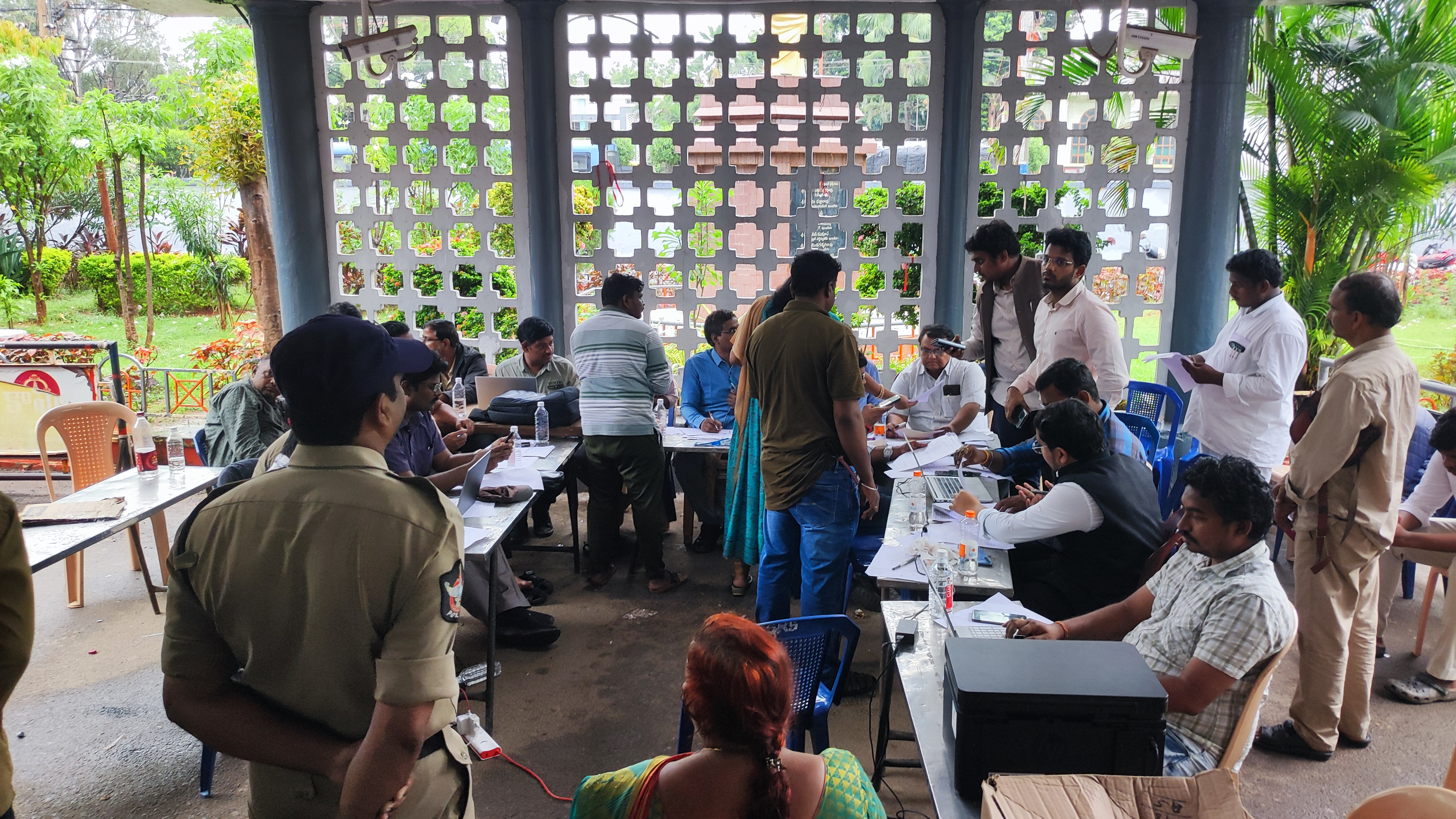
Team working on segregation of relief material at Indira Gandhi Municipal stadium

In response to the crisis, extensive relief and rescue operations have been implemented. As of the latest reports, 6,44,536 people have been affected by the floods. To assist those displaced, 190 relief camps have been established, providing shelter for 44,041 individuals. More than 20 drones have been utilized to deliver food and medicines to areas that are inaccessible by traditional means such as boats and helicopters. Rescue efforts have involved significant coordination among various agencies. A total of 26 teams from the National Disaster Response Force (NDRF) and 22 teams from the State Disaster Response Force (SDRF) have been deployed, alongside numerous volunteers and government officials. Five helicopters from the Indian Air Force and Navy have conducted multiple sorties to supply essentials and rescue stranded individuals.

=== Budameru Bund Restoration ===
Budameru Bund restoration was commenced, which had suffered multiple breaches, leading to widespread devastation. The restoration process involved immediate measures to plug the breaches in the Budameru Diversion Channel (BDC), with significant support from local authorities, the Water Resources Department, and the Indian Army. To prevent future incidents, an additional layer of the bund was constructed with a gap of 4 meters, filled with black cotton soil, and reinforced using concrete metal and geotextile technology. Despite the challenges of heavy seepage in the repaired areas, the authorities successfully fortified the bund, shifting their focus to expanding Kolleru outlets to ensure the safe drainage of surplus water. The restoration efforts included increasing the height of the Budameru Bund as a precautionary measure.

Despite challenges like heavy seepage in the repaired areas, the authorities successfully fortified the bund and shifted their focus to expanding Kolleru outlets to ensure the effective drainage of surplus water. Restoration efforts also included increasing the height of the Budameru Bund as a precautionary measure. As part of a broader flood management strategy, Operation Budameru was launched to explore alternative solutions for increasing the discharge capacity in the event of flash floods and cloudbursts, as well as to remove encroachments. This initiative also involves enhancing the flood discharge capacity of the diversion channel, constructing a 20 TMC ft reservoir downstream of the Pulichintala project, and conducting a clean-up drive to remove fish tanks and restore the contours of Kolleru. A comprehensive survey was planned to identify and remove encroachments along the river, aiming to mitigate future risks and protect the region from similar disasters.

=== Budameru Retaining wall ===
A retaining wall for the Budameru rivulet was proposed following severe flooding in Vijayawada. The floods, which impacted residential areas including Indira Naik Nagar, New RR Peta, Ajith Singh Nagar, and Payakapuram, highlighted the need for enhanced flood protection measures. The proposed retaining wall aims to prevent future inundation by managing floodwaters more effectively. In addition to the retaining wall, plans include increasing the height of existing bunds along the Budameru rivulet to better contain and redirect floodwaters. Recent efforts have addressed breaches in the Budameru diversion channel, which previously allowed floodwaters to enter the city.

== See also ==
- Budameru Rivulet
- 2020 Hyderabad floods
