= Krishna River =

River in southern India

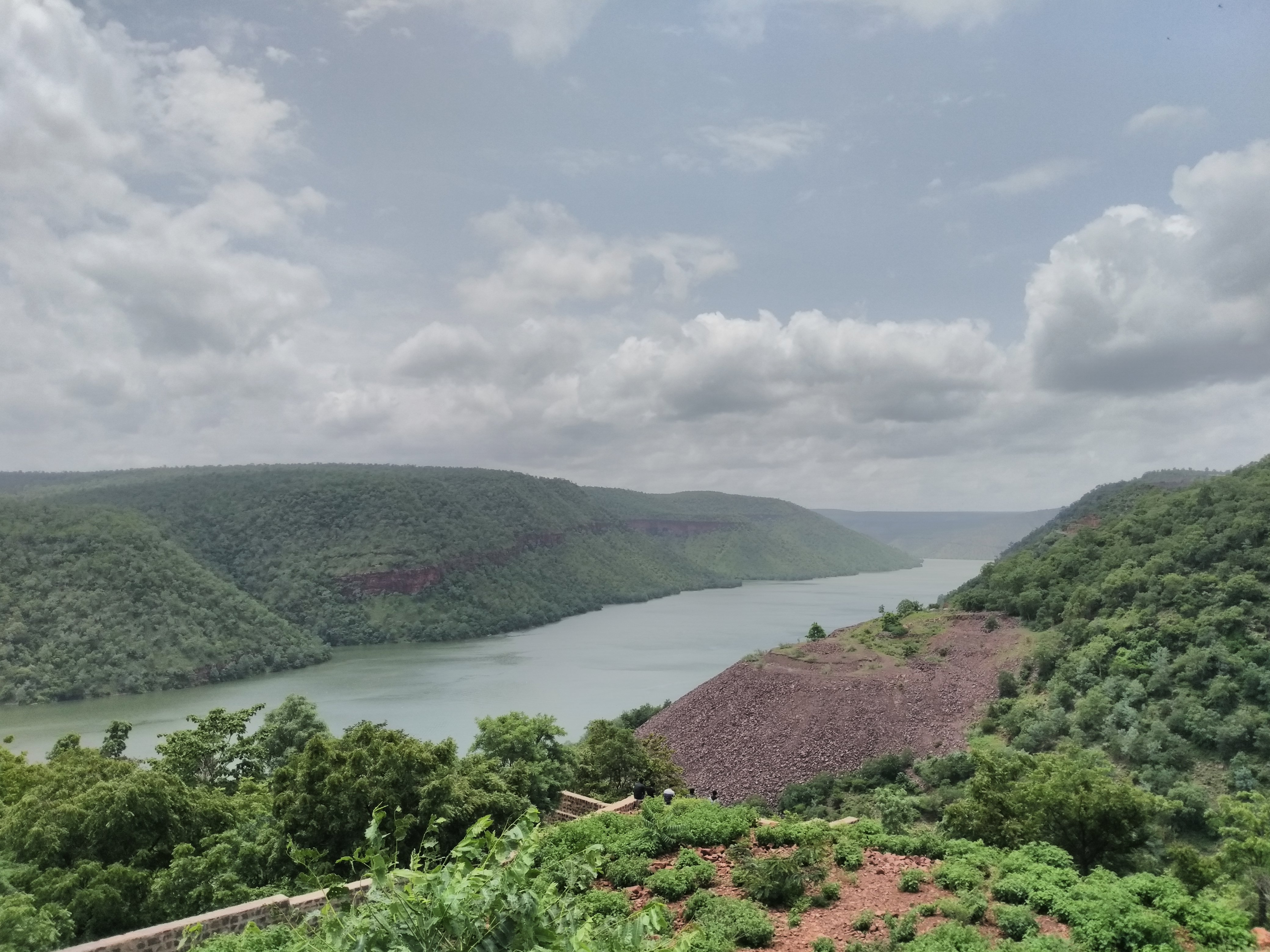
- Krishna River gorge by Srisailam, Andhra Pradesh, India

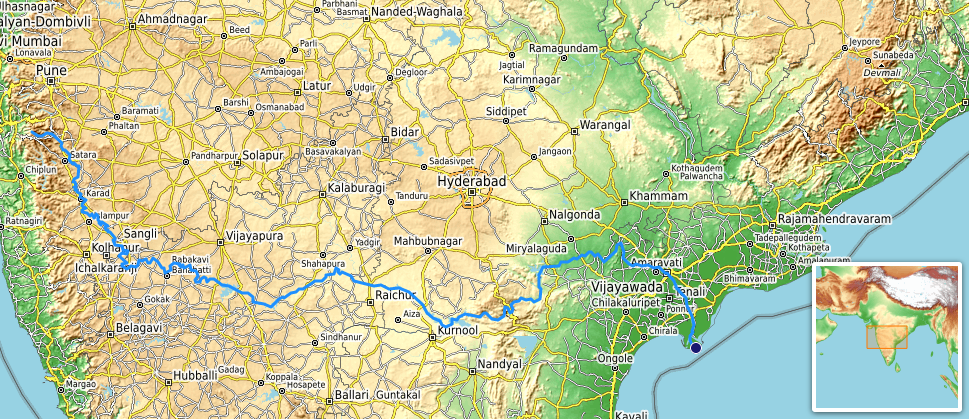
- Path of the Krishna in the peninsular India ()

Location
- Country: India
- State: Maharashtra, Karnataka, Telangana, Andhra Pradesh
- Region: South India

Physical characteristics
- Source: Near Mahabaleshwar, Jor village, Dist- Satara
  - location: Satara district, Maharashtra, India
  - coordinates: 17°59′19″N 73°38′17″E
  - elevation: 914 m (2,999 ft) Geographic headwaters
- Mouth: Bay Of Bengal
  - location: Hamsaladeevi, Krishna district, Andhra Pradesh, India
  - coordinates: 15°44′06″N 80°55′12″E
  - elevation: 0 m (0 ft)
- Length: 1,400 km (870 mi) or 1,290 km (800 mi)approx.
- Basin size: 258,948 km^{2} (99,980 sq mi)
- Discharge
  - average: 2,213 m^{3}/s (78,200 cu ft/s)
- Discharge
  - location: Vijayawada (1901–1979 average), max (2024), min (1997)
  - average: 1,641.74 m^{3}/s (57,978 cu ft/s)
  - minimum: 13.52 m^{3}/s (477 cu ft/s)
  - maximum: 33,413.88 m^{3}/s (1,180,000 cu ft/s)

Basin features
- Tributaries
  - left: Yerla, Bhima, Dindi, Musi, Paleru, Munneru
  - right: Kudali (Niranjna) Venna, Koyna, Panchganga, Dudhaganga, Ghataprabha, Malaprabha, Tungabhadra

The Krishnā River, in full Krishnaveni, in the Deccan Plateau is the third-longest in India, after the Ganga and Godavari. It is also the fourth-largest in terms of water inflows and river basin area in India, after the Ganga, Indus and Godavari. The river is 1,400 kilometres (870 mi) long and flows for 282 kilometres in Maharashtra. It is a major source of irrigation in the Indian states of Maharashtra, Karnataka, Telangana and Andhra Pradesh.

== History ==
Jain literary sources including Kalpasutra and the Nisithacurni describe the region near the Krishnavena (Krishna) River as Abhiradesa (land of the Abhiras), indicating its historical association with the Abhiras.

== Course ==
The Krishna River originates in the Western Ghats near Mahabaleshwar, at an elevation of about 1,300 metres (4,300 ft), in the state of Maharashtra in central India. From Mahabaleshwar, it flows to the town of Wai, and continues east until it empties into the Bay of Bengal. The Krishna River passes through the Indian states of Maharashtra, Karnataka, Andhra Pradesh, and Telangana. Over its 1,400 kilometres (870 mi) length, it flows for 305 km (190 mi) in Maharashtra, 483 km (300 mi) in Karnataka, and 612 km (380 mi) in Andhra Pradesh.

== Tributaries ==
The Krishna River has 13 major tributaries. Its principal tributaries include the Ghataprabha River, Malaprabha River, Bhima River, Tungabhadra River, and Musi River. The Tungabhadra River has a catchment area of 71,417 km^{2} (27,574 sq mi) and a length of 531 km (330 mi). The Bhima River is the longest tributary of the Krishna River. It has a total length of 861 km (535 mi) and a catchment area of 70,614 km^{2} (27,264 sq mi).

Three tributaries, Panchganga, Warana, and Yerla, meet the Krishna River near Sangli. Hindus consider these places holy. It is said that Dattatreya, one of the Hindu deities, spent some of his days at Audumber on the banks of the Krishna.

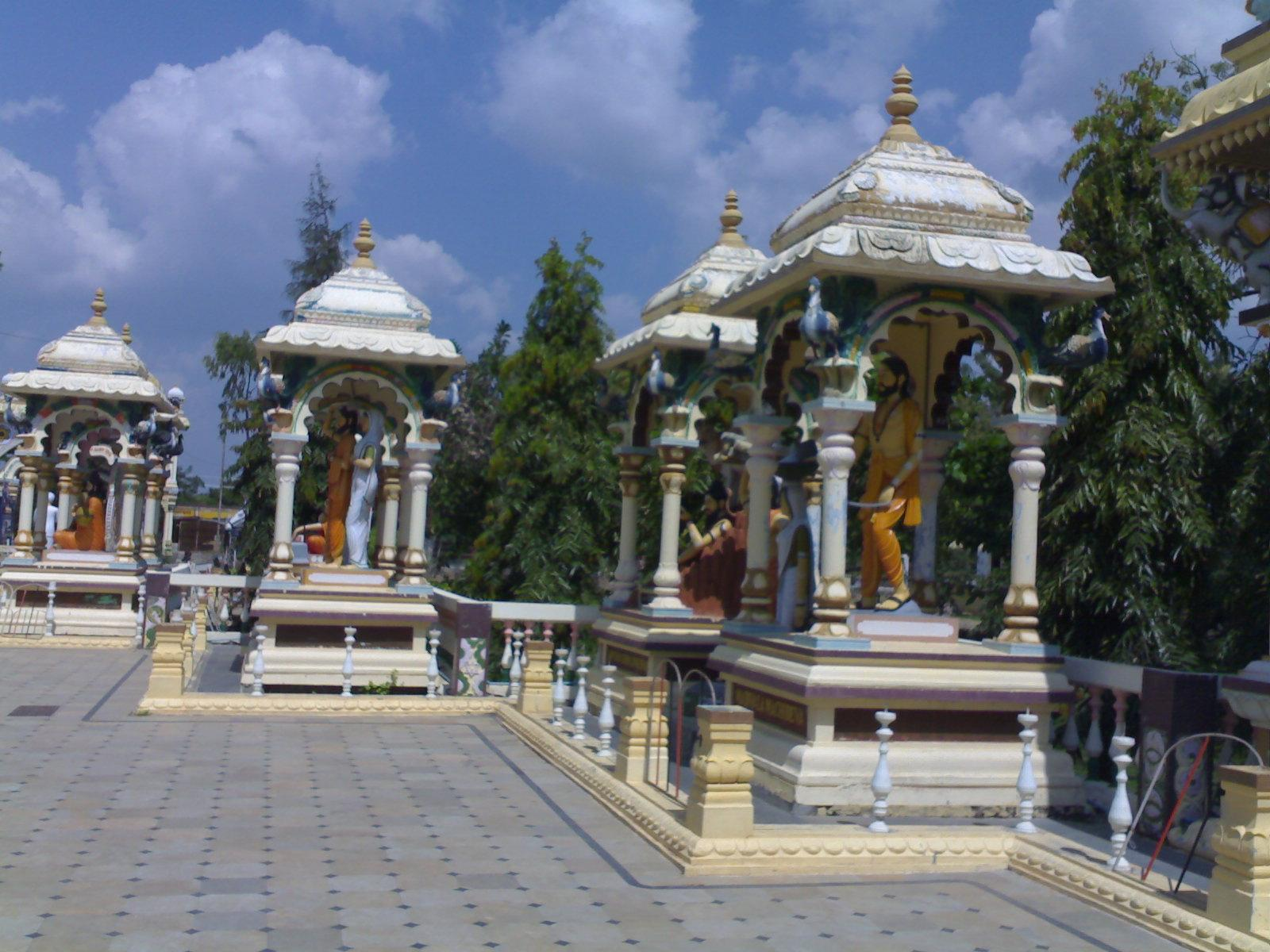
Kudalasangama, North Karnataka

Kudalasangama (also spelled as Kudala Sangama) is located about 15 kilometres (9.3 mi) from the Almatti Dam in Bagalkote district of Karnataka state. It is situated at the confluence of the Krishna and Malaprabha rivers. The Aikya Mantapa or the holy Samādhi of Basavanna, the founder of the Lingayat Hindu sect along with the Linga, which is believed to be self-born (Swayambhu), is here and the river flows east towards Srisailam (another pilgrim center) Andhra Pradesh

== Krishna Basin ==
Drainage Basin of Krishna
1. Bhima Upper (17.6%)
2. Bhima Lower (9.29%)
3. Krishna Upper (21.4%)
4. Krishna Middle (8.73%)
5. Krishna Lower (15.5%)
6. Tungabhadra Upper (11.2%)
7. Tungabhadra Lower (16.3%)

Map of watershed

The Krishna Basin extends over an area of 258,948 km^{2} (99,980 sq mi), which is nearly 8% of the total geographical area of the country. This large basin lies in the states of Karnataka (113,271 km^{2}), Telangana, Andhra Pradesh (76,252 km^{2}), and Maharashtra (69,425 km^{2}). It is the fifth-largest river basin in India. Most of this basin comprises a rolling and undulating country, except for the western border, which is formed by an unbroken line of the Western Ghats. The important soil types found in the basin are black soils, red soils, laterite and lateritic soils, alluvium, mixed soils, red and black soils, and saline and alkaline soils.

An average annual surface water potential of 78.1 km^{3} has been assessed in this basin. Out of this, 58.0 km^{3} is utilizable water. The culturable area in the basin is about 203,000 km^{2} (78,000 sq mi), which is 10.4% of the total cultivable area of the country. As the water availability in the Krishna River was becoming inadequate to meet the water demand, the Godavari River was linked to the Krishna River by commissioning the Polavaram right bank canal with the help of the Pattiseema lift scheme in the year 2015 to augment water availability to the Prakasam Barrage in Andhra Pradesh. The irrigation canals of Prakasam Barrage form part of National Waterway 4. The Krishna-Godavari delta is known as "Rice Granary of India."

== Mineral deposits ==
The Krishna River basin is endowed with rich mineral deposits such as oil and gas, coal, iron, limestone, dolomite, gold, granite, laterite, uranium, diamonds, etc. The following are the few noted deposits:

- Krishna Godavari Basin, oil and gas
- Yellandu, coal
- Bayyaram Mines, iron
- Kudremukh, iron
- Donimalai, iron
- Jaggayapeta mines, dolomite
- Nalgonda uranium deposits
- Kollur Mine, diamonds
- Hatti Gold Mines

== Flora and fauna ==
A widespread area near the Krishna River holds rich flora and fauna. The last surviving Mangrove forests in the Krishna estuary have been designated as the Krishna Wildlife Sanctuary. The sanctuary is the home to a large number of resident and migratory birds. Fishing cats, otters, Estuarine crocodiles, spotted deer, sambar deer, blackbucks, snakes, lizards and jackals can also be spotted in the sanctuary. The sanctuary also supports rich vegetation with plants like Rhizophora, Avicennia, and Aegiceros. The following are a few other wildlife sanctuaries located in the Krishna Basin.

- Nagarjunsagar-Srisailam Tiger Reserve
- Rollapadu Wildlife Sanctuary
- Bhadra Wildlife Sanctuary
- Ghataprabha Bird Sanctuary
- Gudavi Bird Sanctuary
- Koyna Wildlife Sanctuary
- Radhanagari Wildlife Sanctuary
- Great Indian Bustard Sanctuary
- Chandoli National Park
- Kudremukh National Park
- Kasu Brahmananda Reddy National Park
- Mahavir Harina Vanasthali National Park
- Mrugavani National Park
- Pakhal Wildlife Sanctuary
- Ranibennur Blackbuck Sanctuary
- Shettihalli Wildlife Sanctuary
- Daroji Sloth Bear Sanctuary, Bellary

== Waterfalls ==
A few waterfalls are located in the river basin, including:

- Ethipothala on Chandravanka River which is the tributary of Krishna River
- Godchinamalaki on Markandeya River a tributary of Ghataprabha
- Gokak on Ghataprabha
- Mallela Theertham

== Water outflows to the sea ==
The average annual water availability (precipitation minus natural evapotranspiration) is 86.32 billion cubic meters (3047 tmcft). The yearly water outflows to the sea in a water year from 1 June 2003 to 31 May 2022 (19 years) are given below

Waterflow to the sea
Water year	03-04	04-05	05-06	06-07	07-08	08-09	09-10	10–11	11–12	12–13	13–14	14–15	15–16	16–17	17–18	18–19	19–20	20–21	21–22	22-23
Water availability (tmcft)	2096	2250	5523	2117	3297	2011	2652	3162	4753	5319	4495	4809	1930	1906	2396	1818	3381	4067	2693	2854
Water outflows (tmcft)	5	14	113	968	885	296	437	407	215	56	394	73	9	55	0	39	798	1252	485	na

== Interstate water sharing ==
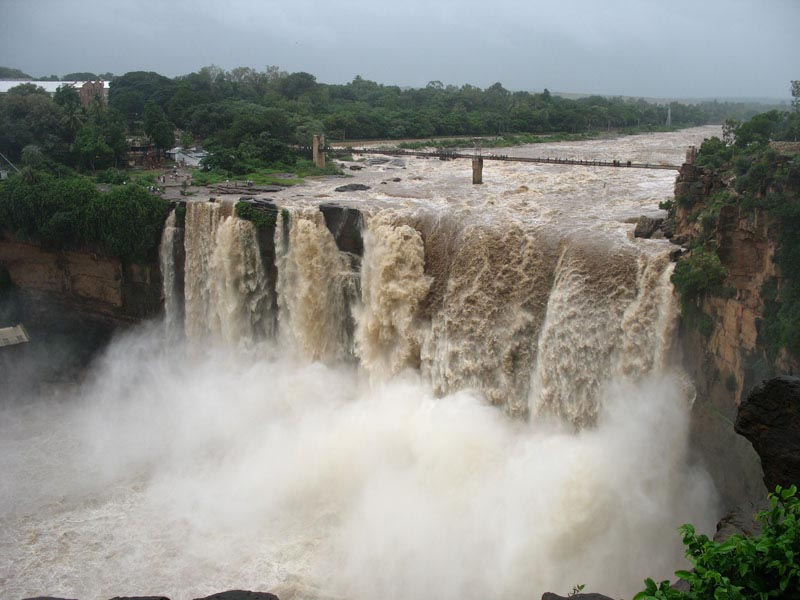
Gokak Falls on Ghataprabha River

At present, the award of the Bachawat tribunal dated 31 May 1976 is applicable for sharing the water available in the river among the riparian states. The Brijesh Kumar tribunal award given on 29 November 2013 was challenged by Andhra Pradesh in the Supreme Court and the case has been pending since then. The newly created state of Telangana also approached the Supreme Court demanding a fresh tribunal hearing to secure its water needs on an equitable basis.

Even though the river does not flow through Tamil Nadu, the Telugu Ganga Project is a canal system that brings Krishna River water to that state's capital city of Chennai with the agreement of all basin states.

== Places and temples ==
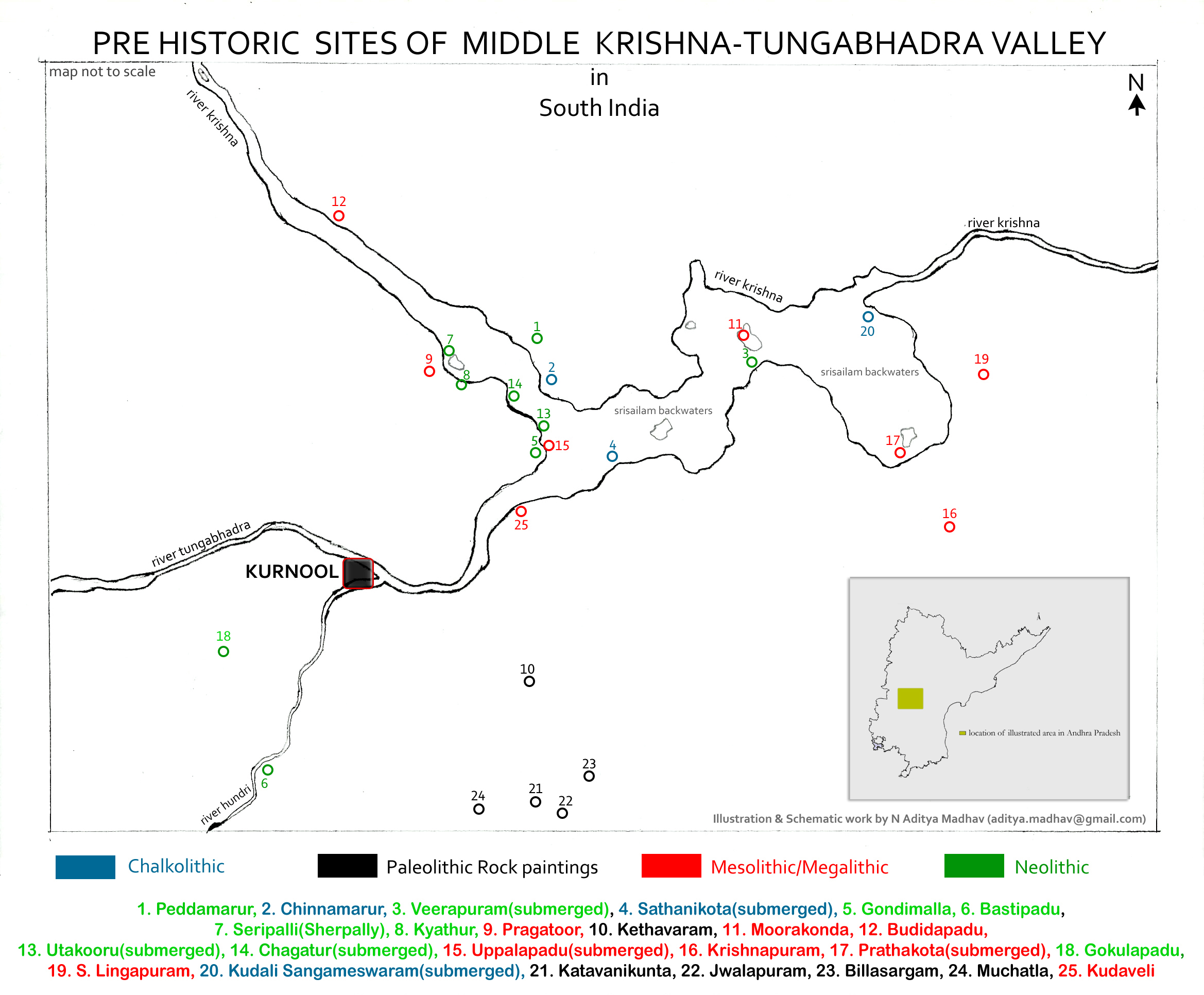
Pre Historic sites of Middle Krishna-Tungabhadra Valley in Telangana, Andhra Pradesh

This river is revered by Hindus as sacred. The river is also believed to remove all the sins of those who bathe in it. The centre of attraction is the Krishna Pushkaram fair which is held once in twelve years on the banks of the Krishna River. There are many pilgrimage places in Maharashtra, Karnataka, Telangana and Andhra Pradesh on the course of the river. The first holy place on the river Krishna is at Wai, known for the Mahaganpati Mandir and Kashivishweshwar temple. It has seven ghats along the river. Temples like Dattadeva temple, which is revered by the people of Maharashtra, are located on the banks of Krishna at Narsobawadi, ankalkhop Audumbar near Sangli. Yadur is one of the important holy places in Karnataka which is located on the bank of Krishna. Veerabhadra temple is a famous temple. Many devotees visit this place from Maharashtra and Andhra Pradesh. Also, located on the banks of the river Krishna is the Sangameshwar Shiva temple at Haripur. Some of the other temples are the Kanaka Durga Temple in Vijayawada, Ramling temple near Sangli, Mallikarjuna Jyotirlinga (Srisailam), Amareshwara Swamy Temple, Vedadri Narasimha Temple, Vadapalli temple in Nalgonda, Dattadeva temple, and Sangameshwara Shiva temples at Alampur and Gadwal in Telangana.

Bhilawadi town in Maharashtra has a large stone structure constructed across the Krishna River bank, also known as Krishna Ghat. This structure also includes one large and one small temple constructed in the middle of the river. This structure is believed to have been constructed in 1779.

The Krishna River annually submerges the Sangameswaram temple and is visible to devotees only during the summer when the reservoir's water level falls.

== Bridges ==
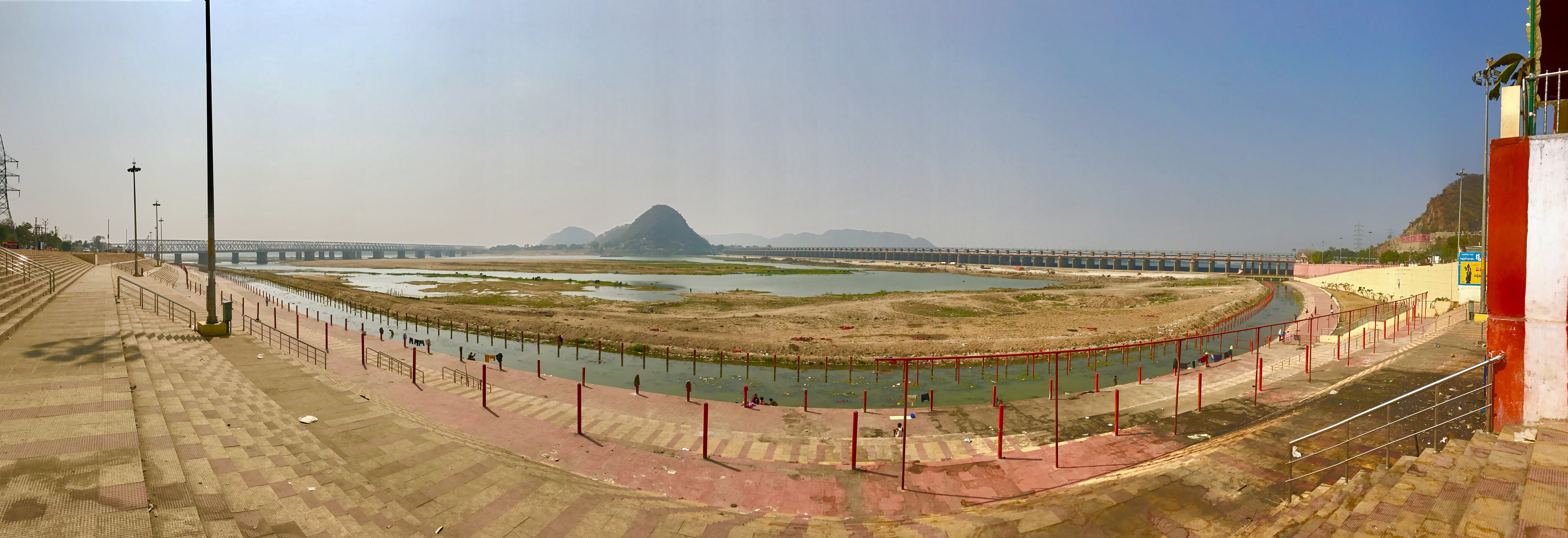
Panorama of Prakasam Barrage and Railway bridges on Krishna near Vijayawada

The Krishna River is spanned by several bridges along its course, some of which are listed below.

- Krishna Bridge, Wai, Maharashtra – This bridge was demolished in 2021 which was located in the Dharmpuri Peth area of the town of Wai, and was one of the oldest bridges that were built by the British in India. It spans the Krishna over nine kamans (arches) and is made of black rock. The bridge serves as a flood mark (when the water rises to the level of the road on the bridge) for the "Waikar" people.
- Irwin Bridge, Sangli – This is one of the oldest, historic and largest bridges over the Krishna that were built by the British. The Irwin Bridge, which is built of reddish stone, has two passages where one can climb down to the river in the middle of its span to view the water.
- Ankali Bridge, Sangli Maharashtra – This bridge is a major link between Sangli and Kolhapur districts. At this point, there are three bridges, one for railway and two for roadways. Out of two roadway bridges, one bridge in the direction towards Miraj was built in the Nineteenth century under the British Administration. It is still in operation. The railway bridge was constructed at the time of the laying of the Kolhapur to Pune rail link. The contractor for the rail bridge was V. R. Ranade & Sons from Pune. The construction of this railway bridge and culverts on railway routes in nearby regions were constructed by them in 1882–1884.
- Kudachi – Ugar Railway bridge was built by the British in 1891.
- B. Soundatti Bridge, Raibag – This is also one of the oldest bridges built during the British rule. This bridge connects Maharashtra to Karnataka state.
- Tangadagi Bridge, This is one of the oldest bridges that connects the Bijapur and the Bagalkot districts of Karnataka. God Neelambika Temple is there at the bank of the Krishna River.
- Chikkapadasalagi bridge, is one of the oldest bridges, built in the British era it connects Jamakhandi and Vijayapur.
- Jambagi Bridge, Jamkhandi : Recently built bridge connects Athani, Bijapur and Jamkhandi.
- Galagali Bridge of Galagali village, Bagalkot: very important bridge that connects many towns and villages of Bagalkot and Vijayapur districts.

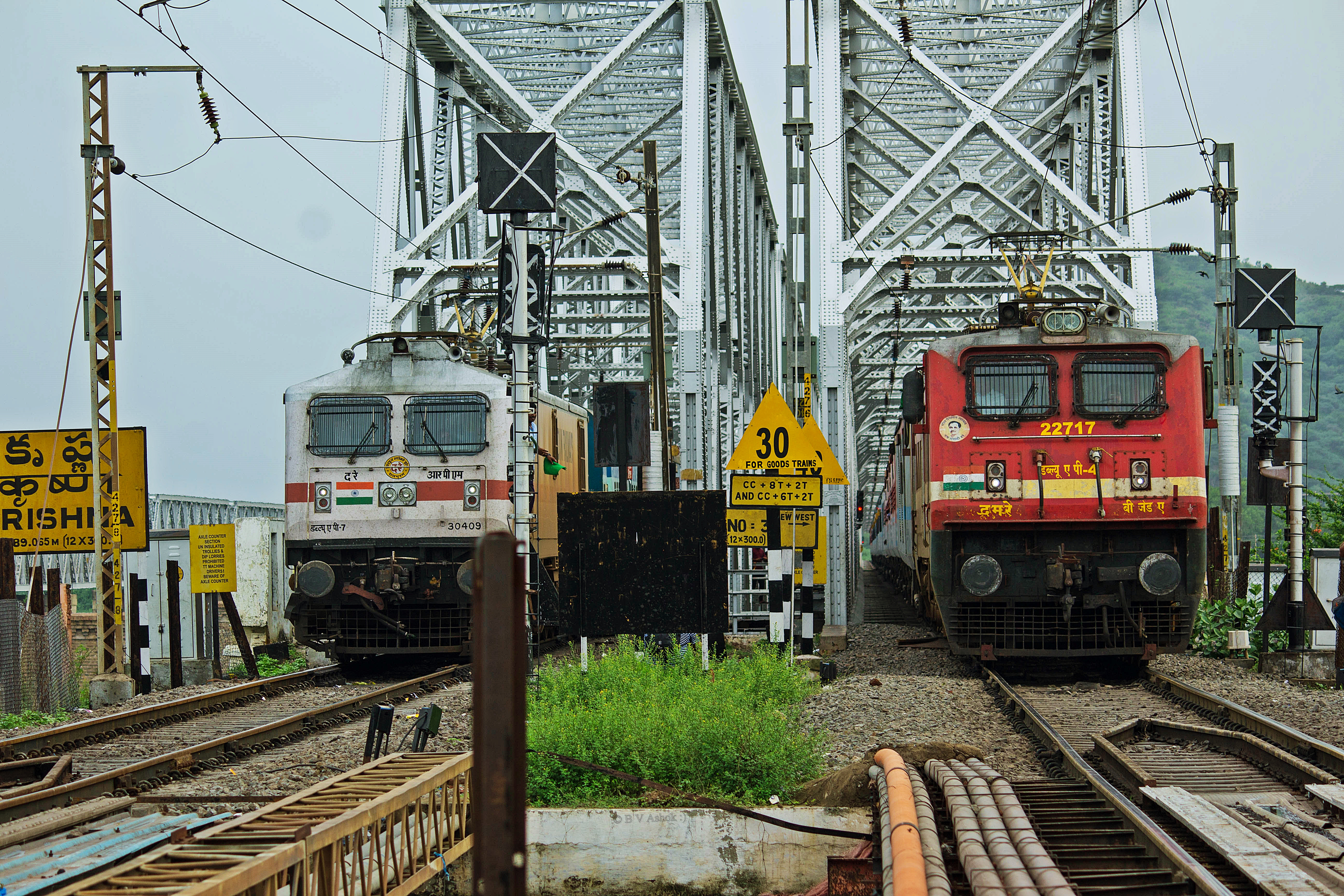
Railway bridge across Krishna near Vijayawada

- Krishna Bridge near Shakti Nagar, Raichur district was built in memory of the travel undertaken by Nawab Javvadjaha Bahadur, the prince of Hyderabad, to Raichur in the early 20th-century. The bridge was named after the prince as Sirat-e-joodi. The construction began in 1933 and completed in 1943

In October 2009, heavy floods occurred, isolating 350 villages and leaving millions homeless, which is believed to be the first occurrence in 1000 years. The flood resulted in heavy damage to Kurnool, Mahabubnagar, Guntur, Krishna and Nalagonda Districts. The entire city of Kurnool was immersed in approximately 10 ft (3 m) water for nearly 3 days.

Water inflow of 1,110,000 cu ft/s (31,000 m^{3}/s) was recorded at the Prakasam Barrage, which surpassed the previous record of 1,080,000 cu ft/s (31,000 m^{3}/s) recorded in the year 1903. Krishna River is the second largest east-flowing river of the peninsula. The flood waters of Krishna and Godavari rivers can be fully utilized by exporting water to other east-flowing peninsular rivers up to the Vaigai River in Tamil Nadu by constructing a coastal reservoir on the Bay of Bengal sea area.

== Dams ==
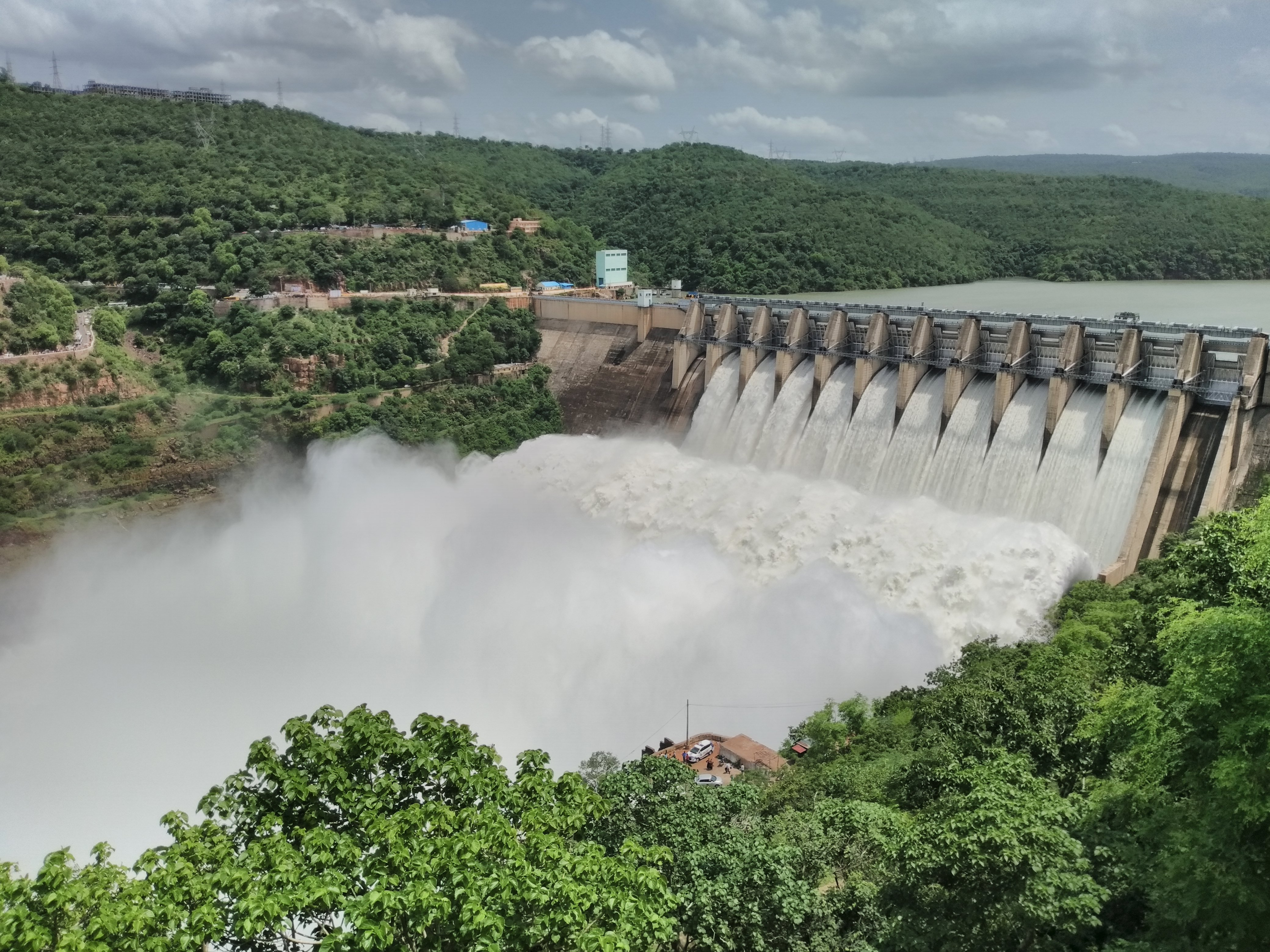
NSRS Srisailam Dam

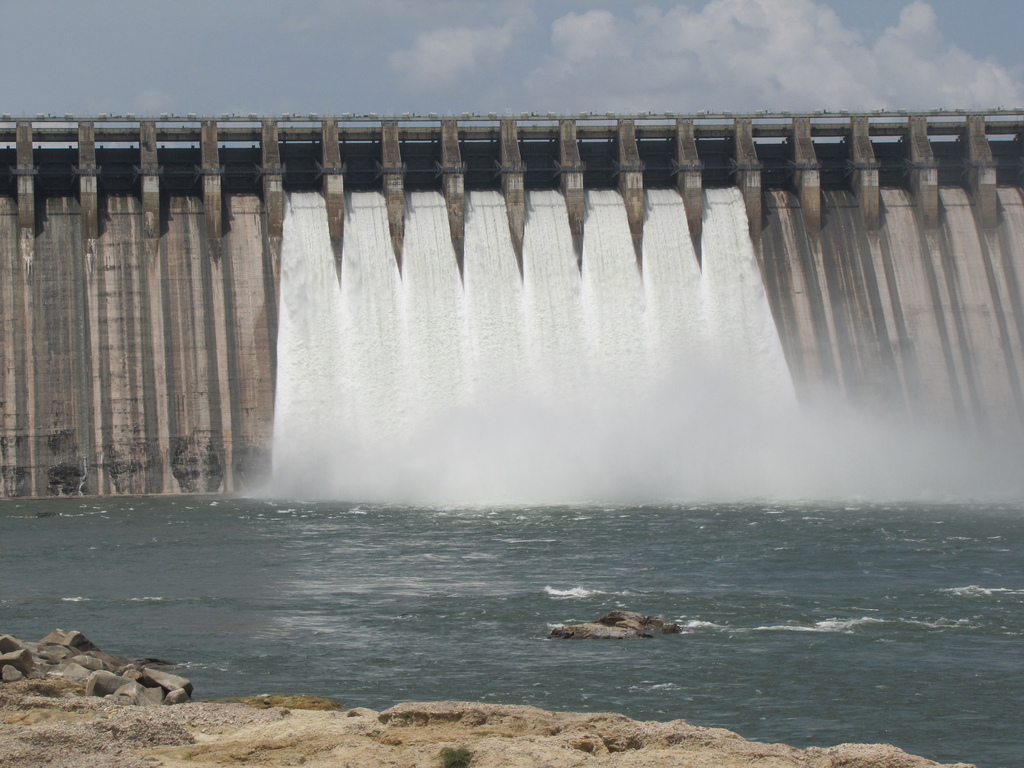
Nagarjuna Sagar Dam Gates view

There are many dams constructed across the Krishna River.

- Dhom Dam
- Hippargi barrage
- Almatti Dam
- Narayanpur Dam
- Bhima Dam
- Jurala Dam
- Srisailam Dam
- Nagarjuna Sagar Dam
- Nagarjuna Sagar tail pond
- Pulichinthala Dam
- Prakasam Barrage
- Tungabhadra Dam
- Rajolibanda barrage
- Sunkesula barrage

== Navigation ==
Under National Waterway 4 project, Godavari and Krishna rivers are being developed suitable for navigation. Initially, waterways using irrigation canals and the main river courses for interconnecting Kakinada, Puducherry, Bhadrachalam on Godavari and Ibrahimpatnam on Krishna would be developed suitable for 500 tons cargo carrying ships. Later, Krishna main river course would be developed as waterway up to Galagali in Karnataka.

== Hydroelectric power stations ==
The Krishna River is one of the rivers whose water energy is harnessed to a large extent by various hydroelectric power stations in India. The following is the list of hydroelectric power stations excluding small and medium installations.

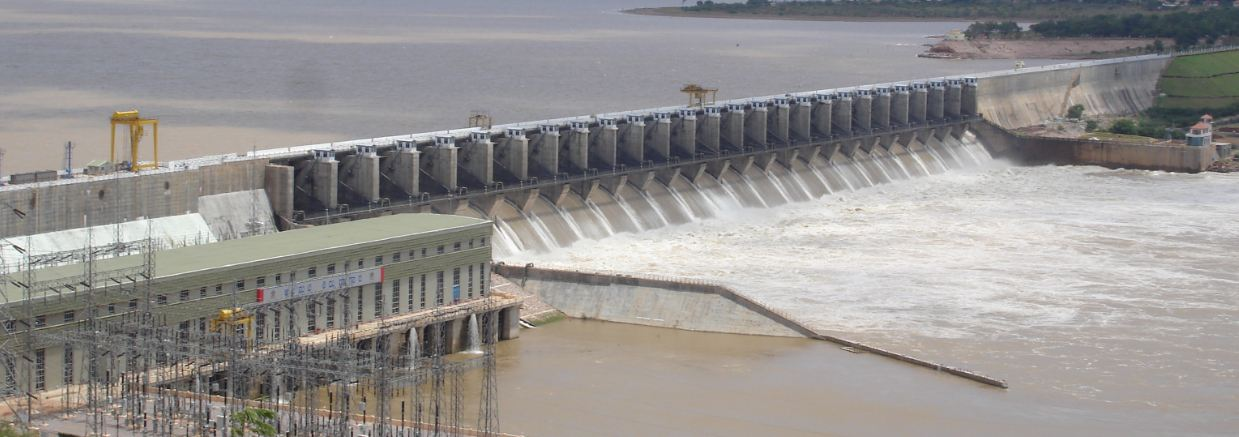
Almatti Dam with its right bank power house

Name of the project	Rated Power (in MW)	Comments
Koyna Hydroelectric Project	1,920	
Mulshi Dam	300	Power station with Pumped-storage hydroelectricity units
Thokarwadi Dam	72	
Ujjani Dam	12	Power station with Pumped-storage hydroelectricity units
Almatti Dam	290	
Bhadra Dam	39	
Tungabhadra Dam	127	
Jurala Hydroelectric Project	240	
Lower Jurala Hydro Electric Project	240	
Srisailam Dam	1,670	Power station with Pumped-storage hydroelectricity units
Nagarjuna Sagar Dam	960	Power station with Pumped-storage hydroelectricity units
Nagarjuna Sagar tail pond	50	
Pulichinthala Dam	120	

== Pollution and Ecology effect ==
Most of the years, the river water does not join the sea due to the full utilisation of water mainly in agriculture. The closed river basin of Krishna means that the river ecosystem is on the verge of death. The river receives waste from a large number of cities and the river basin population has increased to 80 million, increasing pollution load many fold into the river. Adequate average and minimum continuous environmental flows to the sea are not taking place in most of the years constricting salt export and leading to the formation of saline and sodic alkaline soils in the lower reaches of the river basin. High alkalinity water is discharged from the ash dump areas of many coal-fired power stations into the river which further increases the alkalinity of the river water whose water is naturally of high alkalinity since the river basin is draining vast areas of basalt rock formations. The following are the few coal-fired power stations located in the river basin.

Thermal power stations in Krishna River basin
Name of Power Station	Rated Power (in MW)
Vijayawada Thermal Power Station	1,760
Raichur Thermal Power Station	1,470
Bellary Thermal Power station	1,700
Yermarus Thermal Power Station	1,600
Solapur Super Thermal Power Station	1,320
Kudgi Super Thermal Power Project	2,400
Yadadri Thermal Power Plant	4000

== Floods ==
In 2009, the river experienced flooding due to heavy rainfall in Karnataka, which forced the opening of the Almatti and Narayanpur dam gates on the Krishna River.

=== 2024 floods ===
In early September 2024, Vijayawada, a city in Andhra Pradesh, India, experienced severe flooding triggered by exceptionally heavy rainfall that began on 31 August 2024. The floods resulted in at least 35 deaths in NTR district and significantly impacted approximately 270,000 people in Vijayawada alone. During this time, the Krishna River also experienced unprecedented flooding, and due to continuous heavy rainfall, the river saw record inflows, with the Prakasam Barrage discharging 33,000 cubic metres (1,180,000 cu ft) per second of water, the highest in its 70-year history. This massive release was necessary as the barrage reached its capacity, and all 70 gates were opened to manage the excess water. The inflows were intensified by torrential rains in the upstream regions, including the Pulichintala and Nagarjuna Sagar projects. The barrage's total capacity of 34,000 cubic metres (1,190,000 cu ft) per second was overwhelmed, leading to the temporary suspension of vehicle and pedestrian movement across the structure for safety reasons. The floods inundated low-lying residential areas in Vijayawada and several villages downstream, causing significant damage to infrastructure, homes and agricultural land.

=== 2025 floods ===
In August 2025, the Krishna River basin in Karnataka faced renewed flood threats following continuous heavy rainfall. The Almatti Dam released 2.5 lakh cusecs of water, and the Krishna River at Rajapur Barrage recorded inflows of 1.4 lakh cusecs. Authorities issued flood alerts, evacuated residents from vulnerable areas, and established relief centres to manage the situation.

== Gallery ==
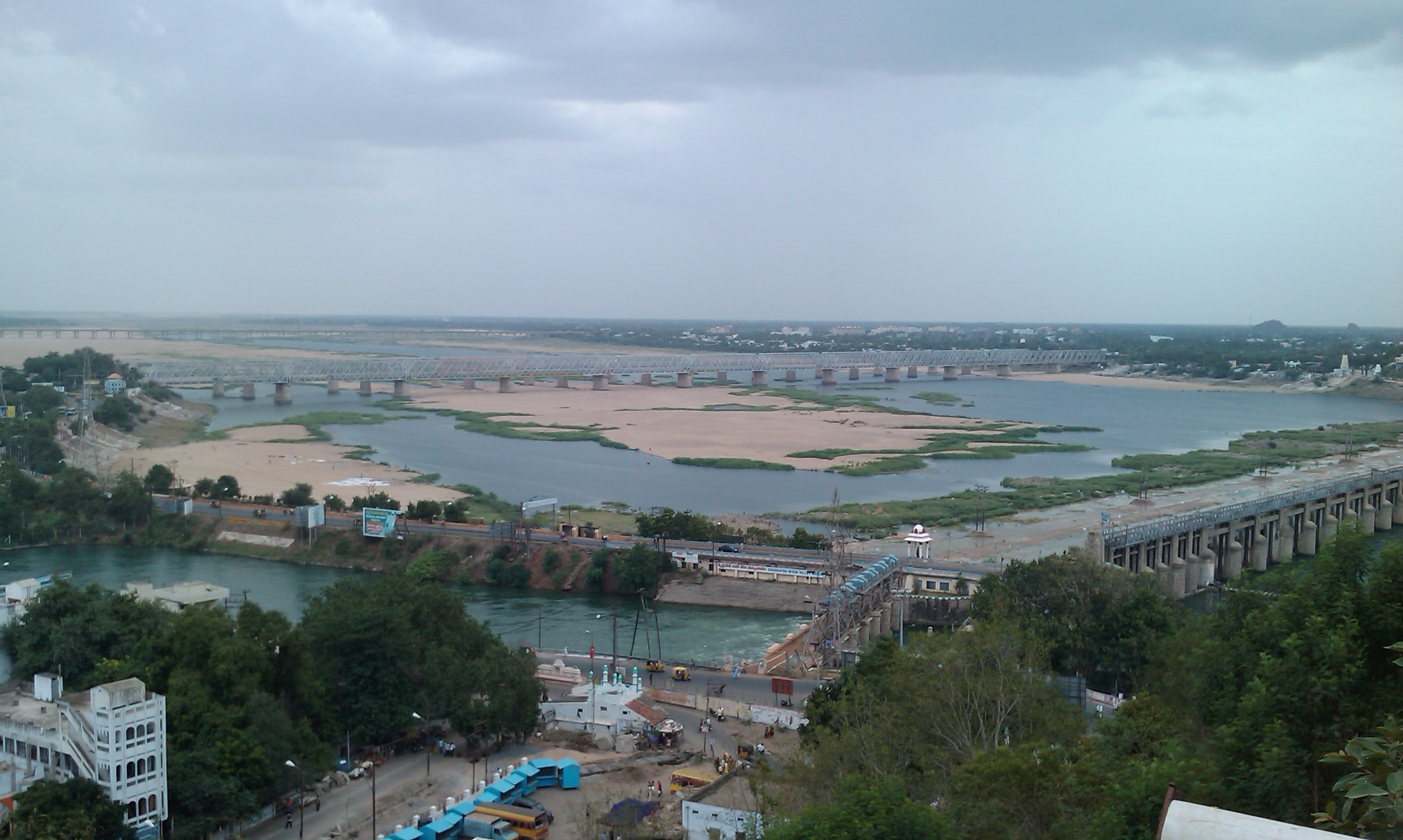
Down stream view of Prakasam Barrage

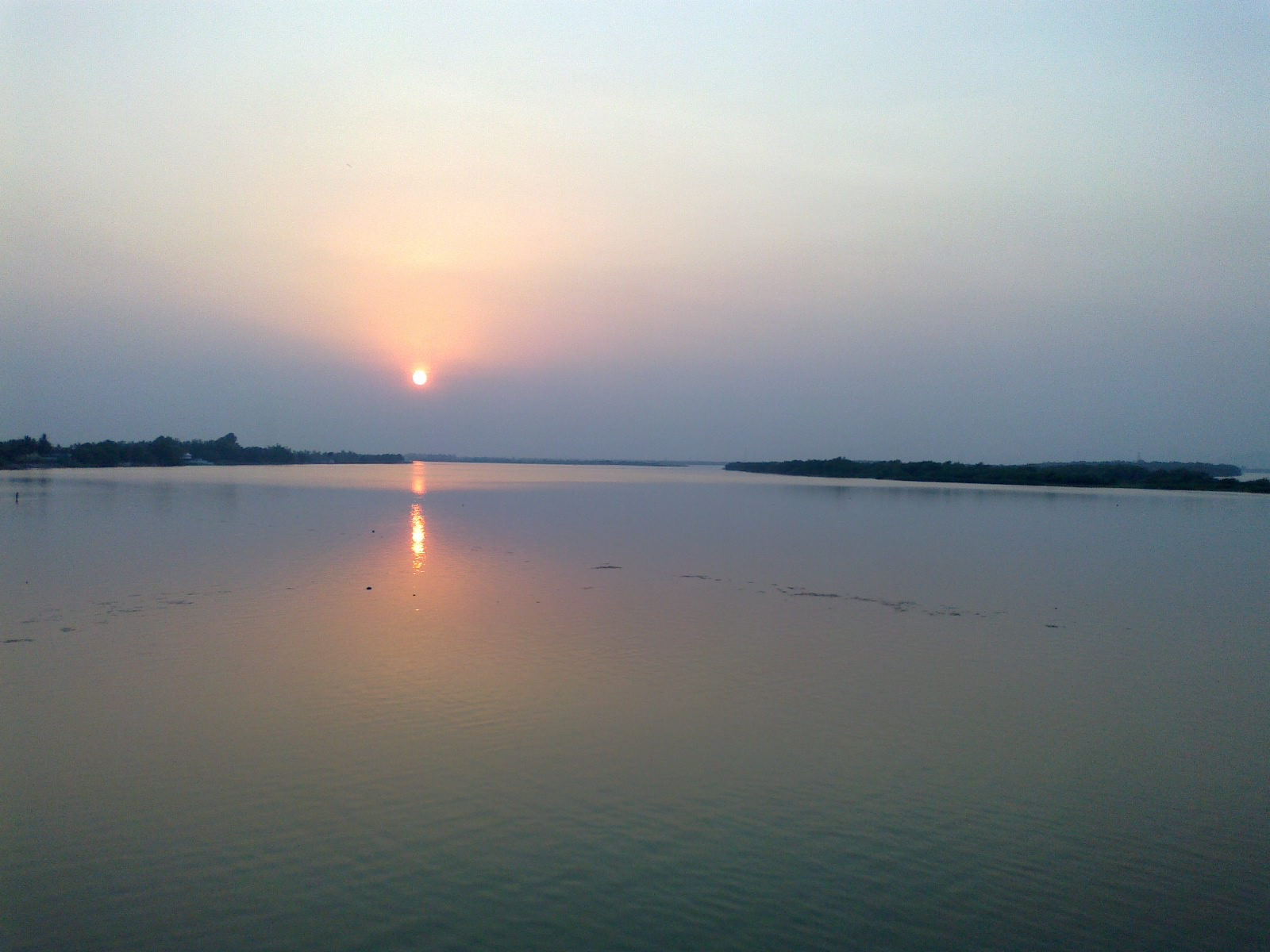
Krishna River near Vijayawada

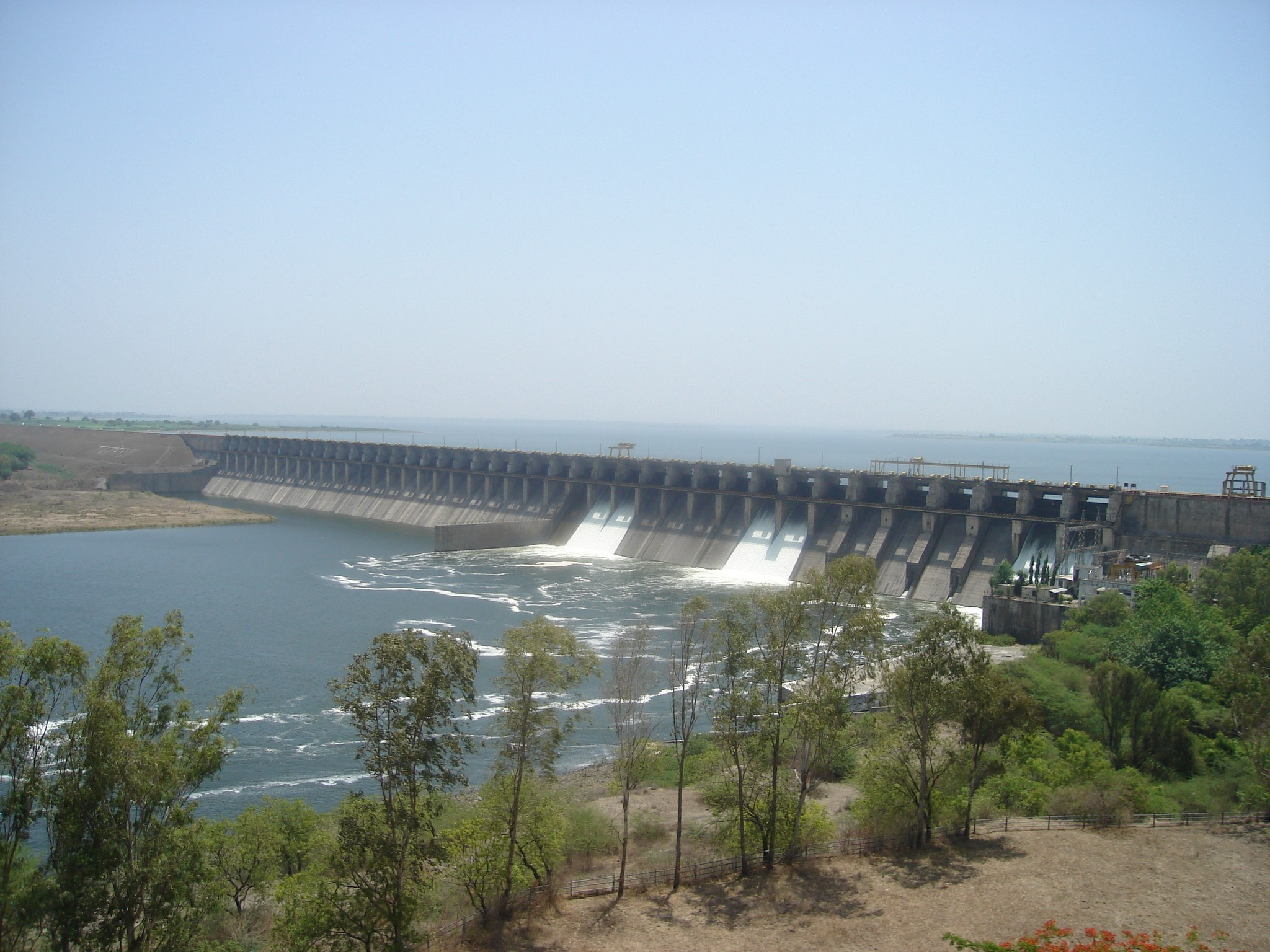
Panoramic view of Ujjani or Bhima Dam

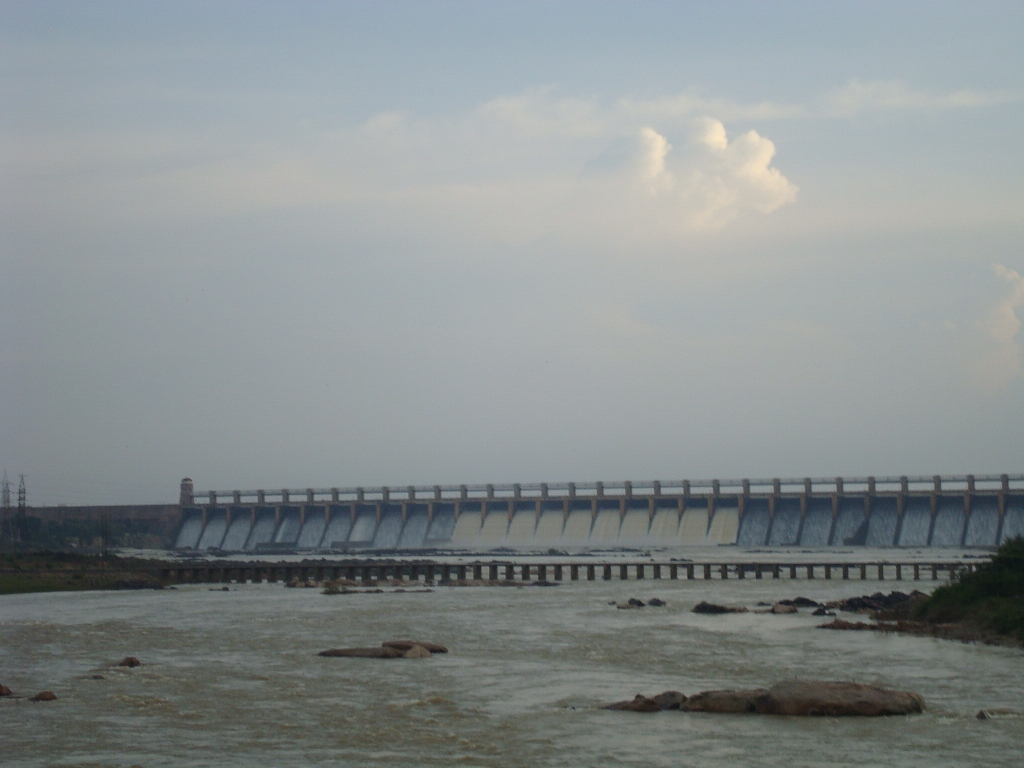
Tungabhadra Dam near Hosapete

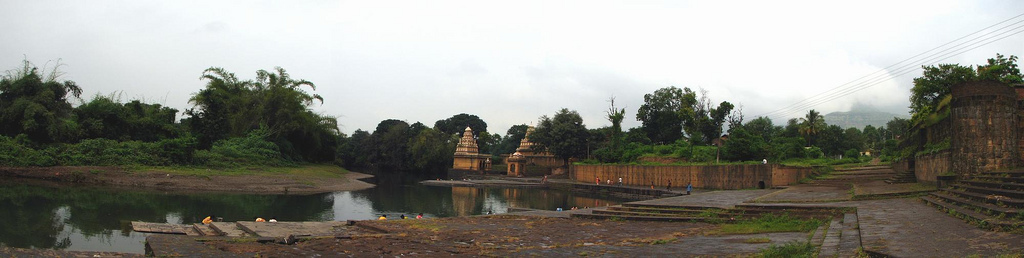
Krishna close to its origin at Menawali, near Wai, Satara district, Maharashtra.18th century, Maratha statesman, Nana Fadnavis built the Ghat and a palace here. This location has been used in many Hindi movies.

== See also ==
- List of rivers of India
- Godavari River
- Krishna Water Disputes Tribunal
- Upper Krishna Project
- Krishna Pushkaralu
- Sacred waters
- Other rivers originating at Mahabaleshwar (Panchganga) Gayatri River, Koyna River, Savitri River and Venna River
