= Prakasam Barrage =

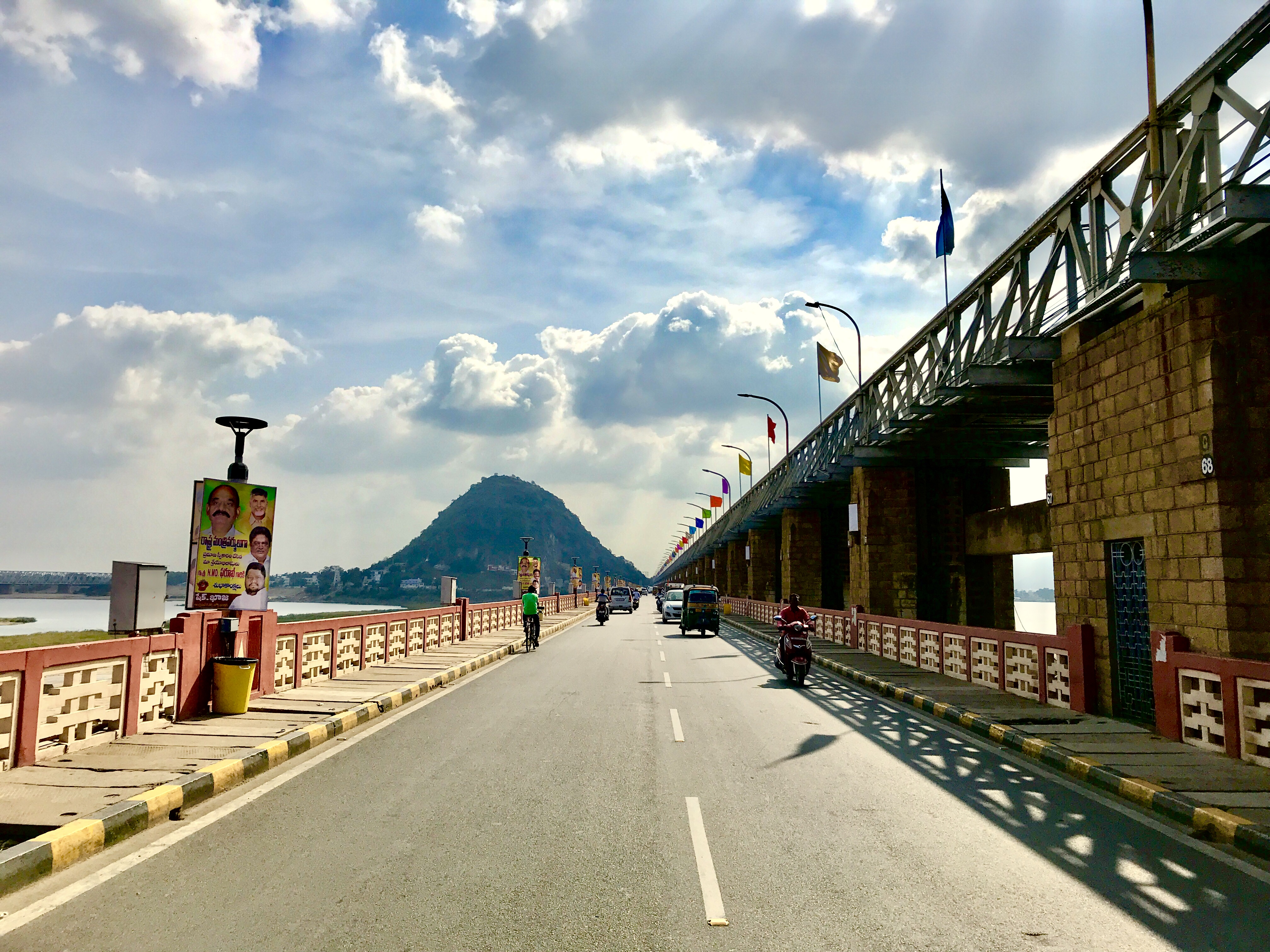
- The barrage in 2018

- Location of the barrage in Andhra Pradesh
- Interactive map of Prakasam Barrage
- Country: India
- Location: Near Indra Keeladri, Vijayawada
- Coordinates: 16°30′22″N 80°36′18″E
- Purpose: Irrigation; Water supply
- Status: Operational
- Construction began: 1852
- Opening date: 1855
- Owner: Government of Andhra Pradesh

Dam and spillways
- Type of dam: Barrage
- Impounds: Krishna River
- Length: 1,223.5 m (4,014 ft)

Reservoir
- Total capacity: 3,790 ML (3.07×10^{3} acre⋅ft)
- Catchment area: 251,372 km^{2} (97,055 sq mi)
- Surface area: 30 km^{2} (12 sq mi)
- Maximum water depth: 6.11 m (20.0 ft)
- Website irrigationap.cgg.gov.in

The Prakasam Barrage is a 1,223.5-metre-long (4,014 ft) tidal barrage across the Krishna River connecting Vijayawada and Guntur districts in Andhra Pradesh, India. The barrage serves also as a road bridge that spans a lake, formed by the barrage wall. The three canals associated with the barrage run through the city of Vijayawada, crossing it and giving it a Venetian appearance.

== Overview ==
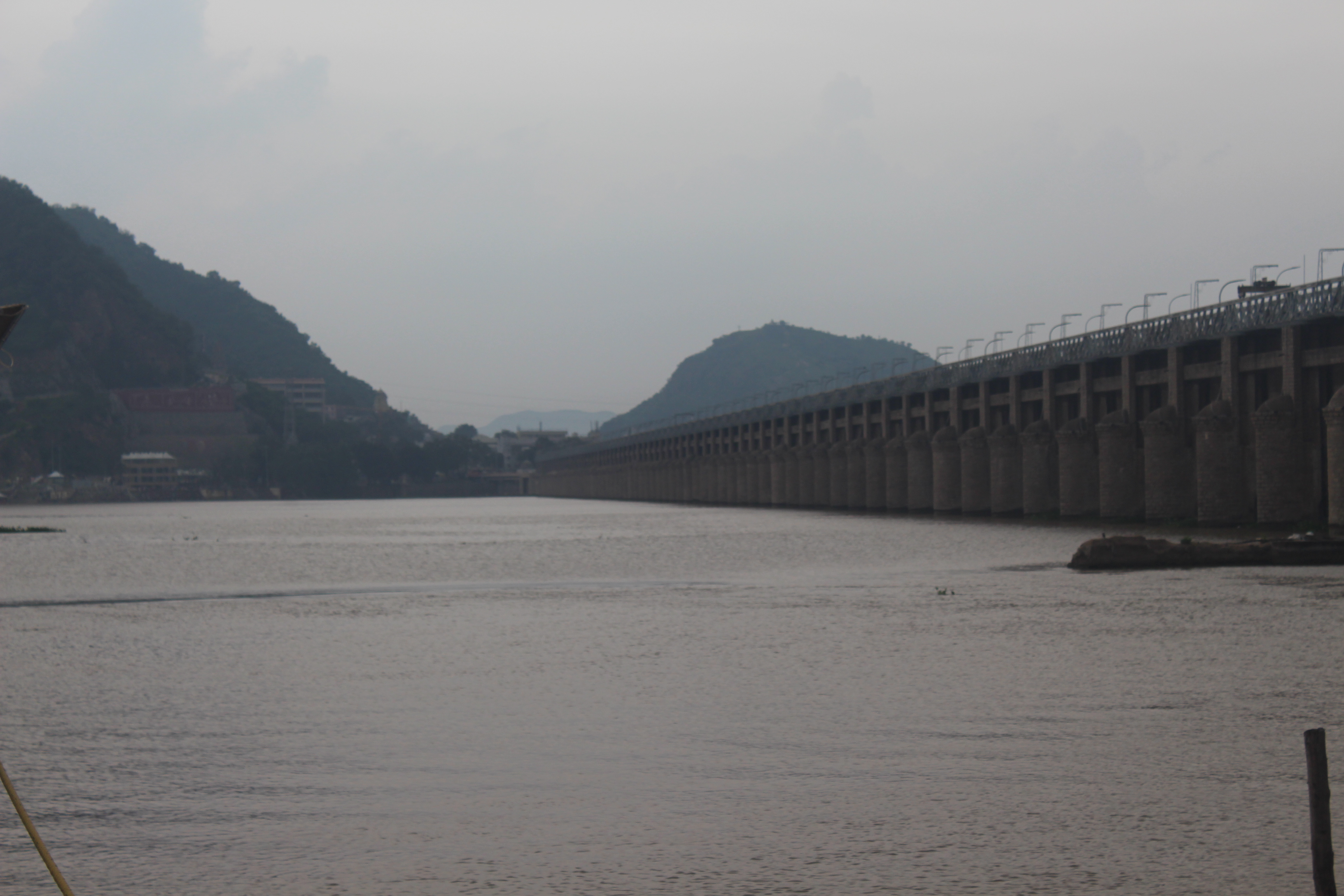
View of the barrage from the boating area

The idea of constructing a dam across the river Krishna dates from 1798. It began in the hands of Captain Buckle and was revised in 1839 and 1841 by Captain Best and Captain Lake. After the approval of Major Cotton, the board of Directors of the East India Company approved it on 5 January 1850. The dam was begun in 1852 and completed in 1855. It cost Rs 1.75 crore in those days and seems to have paid the then government a return of 18%. It used to irrigate 7 lakh acres.

Later, the State Government constructed a bridge that was named after Tanguturi Prakasam, the first Chief Minister of Andhra (a state formed in 1953, which later became Andhra Pradesh in 1956 after the merger of Telugu speaking districts of former Hyderabad State). Completed in 1957, it helps to irrigate over 1.2 million acres of land. This barrage also supplies water to Buckingham canal which was initially constructed as an inland navigation canal but was later used as an irrigation water supply canal. One of the first major irrigation projects of South India, the Prakasam Barrage in Vijayawada was completely successful in its mission.

Andhra Pradesh largely owes its rich agriculture to the Prakasam Barrage as the project facilitated the irrigation of large tracts of farmland. The Barrage provides views of the lake. It has become a tourist attraction of Vijayawada.

On 13 February 2019, Andhra Pradesh chief minister Nara Chandrababu Naidu laid a foundation stone to construct a new barrage named Vykuntapuram Barrage on the Krishna River nearly 25 kilometres (16 mi) upstream of Prakasam Barrage.

== Specifications ==
The designed maximum water level is 22.13 metres (72.6 ft) msl whereas the full reservoir level is 17.39 metres (57.1 ft) msl with a scope to enhance the live water storage by increasing the gates height by 4.74 metres (15.6 ft) height to enable the back waters reach the toe of the Pulichinthala Dam at 20 metres (66 ft) msl for pumping water into the Pulichinthala reservoir.

The maximum flood flow experienced at the barrage was 31 thousand cubic metres per second (1.11×10^{6} cu ft/s) at 20.97 metres (68.8 ft) msl on 5 October 2009. During the severe floods in September 2024, the peak flood flow reached 30 thousand cubic metres per second (1.06×10^{6} cu ft/s) at the barrage against the designed flow of 34 thousand cubic metres per second (1.19×10^{6} cu ft/s).

== Godavari-Penna river interlinking project ==
Project Name	FRL	Creast Level	MDDL	Tail Race Level	Power Generation		Reservoir area In km^{2}	Storage capacity In TMC		
Project Name	FRL	Creast Level	MDDL	Tail Race Level	Capacity	Type of Turbines	Reservoir area In km^{2}	Gross	Live	Dead
Srisailam Project	269.75 M (885 Ft)	252.98 M (830 Ft)	214.88 M (705 Ft)	163 M (535 Ft)	1670 MW	Francis Turbines	541.9	215.8	178.7	3.42
Nagarjuna Sagar	179.83 M (590 Ft)	166.42 M (546 Ft)	155.45 M (510 Ft)	73.15 M (240 Ft)	816 MW	Francis Turbines	285	312	181	
Nagarjuna Sagar Tail pond	75 M (246 Ft)			48.33 M (158.56 Ft)	50 MW	Kaplan Turbines				
Pulichinthala Project	53.34 M (175 Ft)	36.34 M (119.23 Ft)		20 M (65.6 Ft)	120 MW	Kaplan Turbines	144	45.77	36.23	3.61
Vykuntapuram Barrage	25 M (82 Ft)	17 M (55.77 Ft)						10		

== Gallery ==
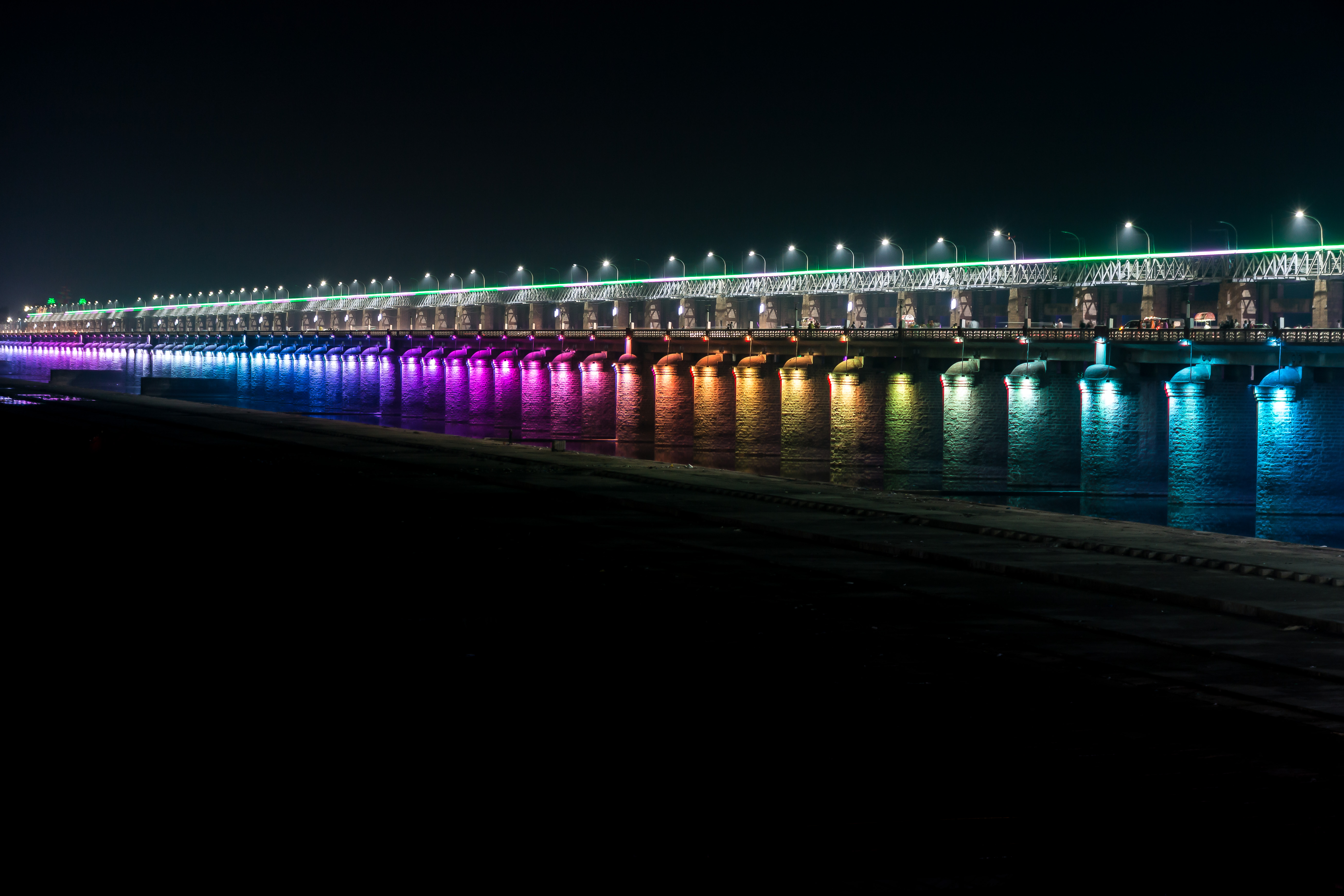
Night view of Prakasam Barrage

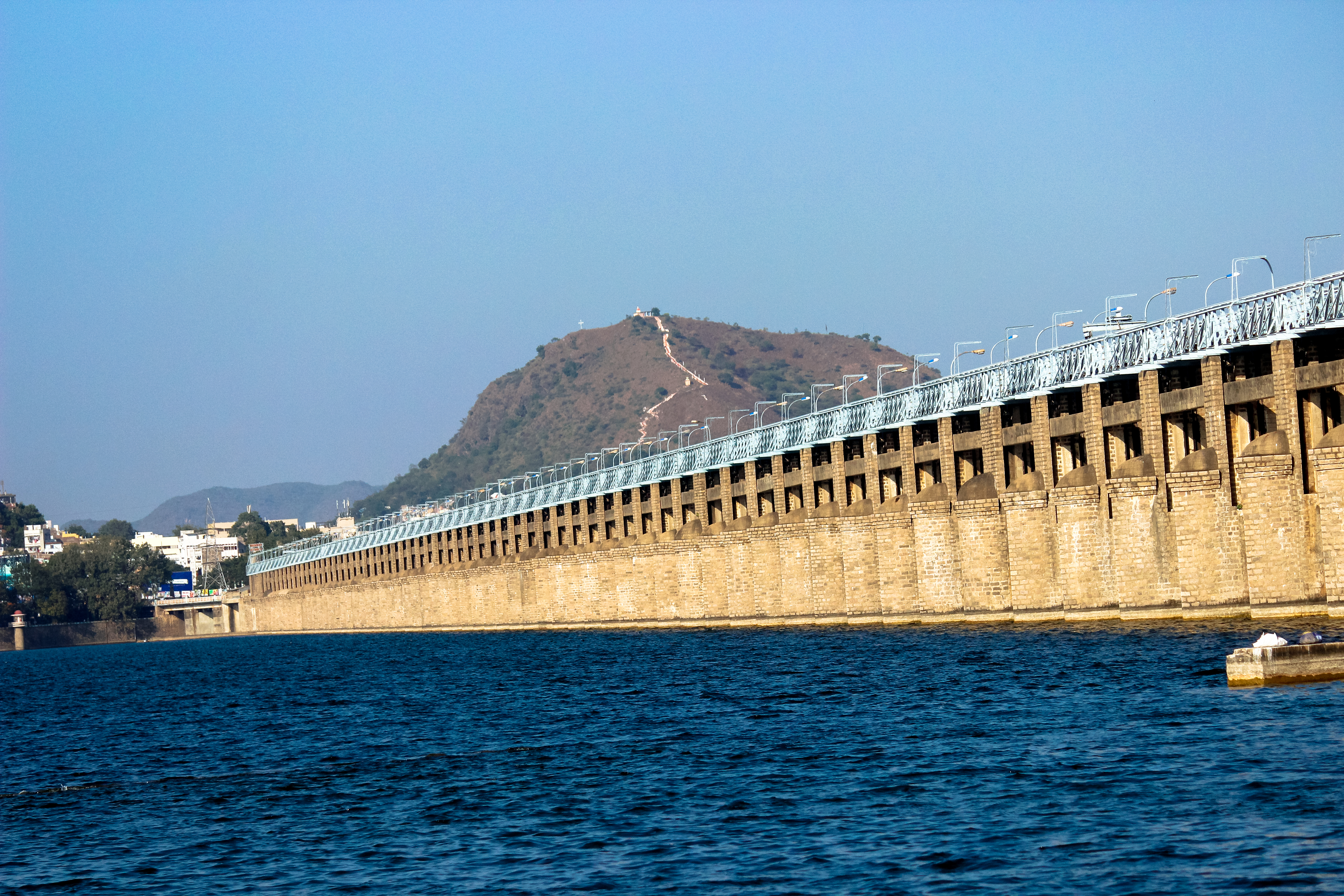
Lake side view of Prakasam Barrage

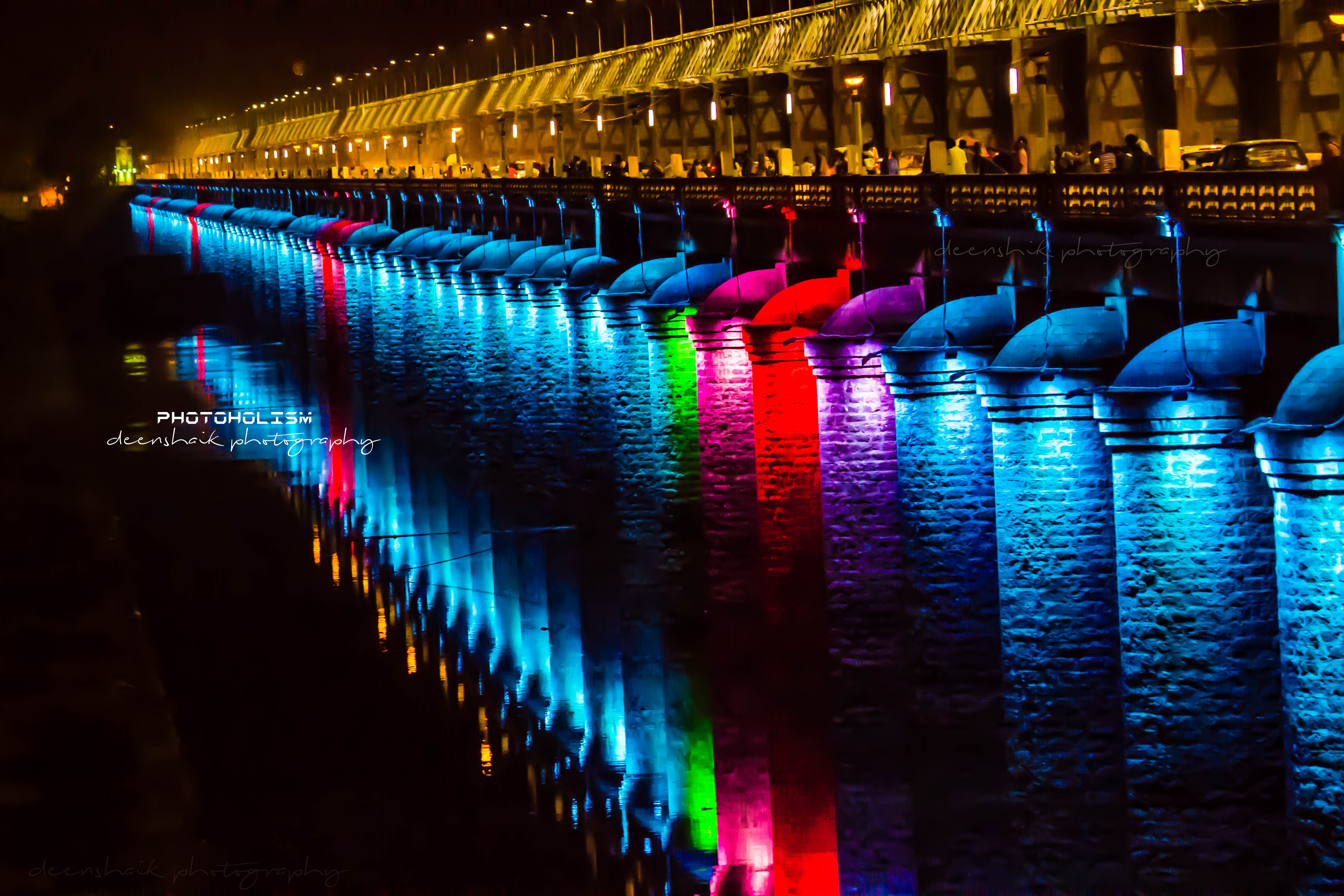
Prakasam barrage from Krishnaveni idol

== See also ==
- List of dams and reservoirs in India
- List of tidal barrages
