= Mallela Theertham =

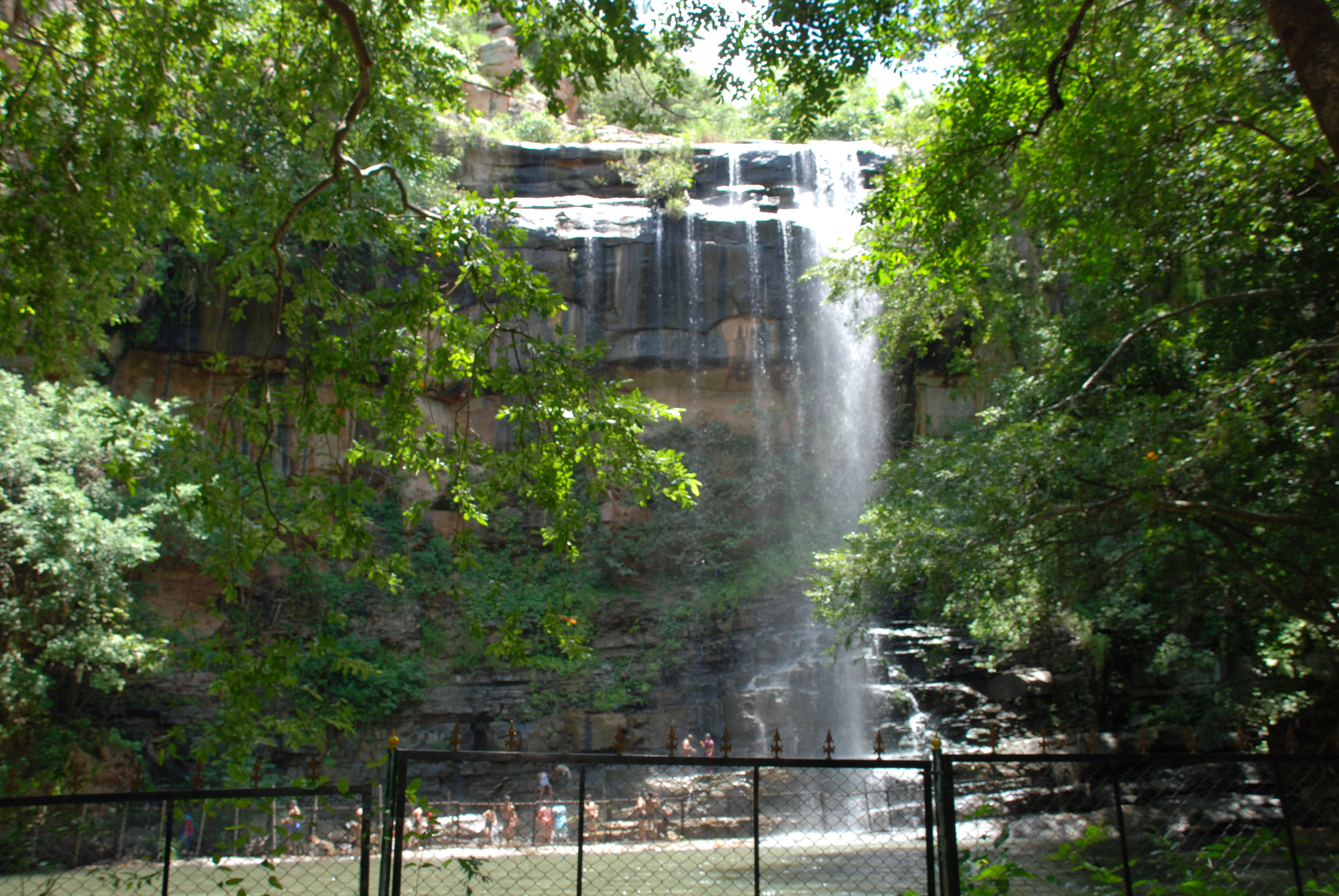
- Mallela Theertham Waterfall view

- Location within Telangana
- Location: Mallela Theertham, Nagarkurnool district, Telangana
- Coordinates: 16°15′58″N 78°51′23″E
- Type: Waterfalls
- Number of drops: multiple

Mallela Theertham is a waterfall located in the Nallamala Forest in Nagarkurnool, Telangana, India. The River Krishna flows through this forest. It is located around 58 km from Srisailam and 185 km from Hyderabad.

== Waterfall ==
Mallela Theertham is in the middle of the dense forest. A walk down 350 steps is required to access the waterfall.

It flows through the dense jungle and then meets the Krishna River. The falls are closest to the town of Achampet, Telangana.

== History ==
It is said that many sages have performed penances there for Shiva and Shiva has himself appeared there to many of his devotees. It is believed that many tigers visit there to drink water during summer.

== See also ==
- List of waterfalls
- List of waterfalls in India
