= Donimalai Township =

Donimalai
- Township
- Location in Karnataka, India
- Coordinates: 15.0589°N 76.5937°E
- Country: India
- State: Karnataka
- District: Bellary;Taluk-Sandur

Population (2001 census)
  - Total: 6,555

Languages
  - Official: Kannada
- Time zone: UTC+5:30 (IST)
- PIN: 583-118
- Telephone code: 918395

Donimalai Township is a township in Bellary district in the state of Karnataka, India.

== Etymology ==
Donimalai derives its name from words Doni and Malai in Kannada. Doni is multi-purpose sailboat with a motor or lateen sails and malai means Hills. The shape of the township resembles the shape of boat(doni) and is fully surrounded by green Forest hills. And hence derived its name Donimalai meaning boat shaped forest hills.

== Demographics ==
As of 2001 India census, Donimalai Township had a population of 6555. Males constitute 52% of the population and females 48%. Donimalai Township has an average literacy rate of 80%, higher than the national average of 74.0%: male literacy is 86% and, female literacy is 74%. In Donimalai Township, 10% of the population is under 6 years of age.

== Economy ==
Donimalai mechanised iron ore mines of National Mineral Development Corporation (Now M/s.NMDC Limited) are located here. Donimalai township is at a distance of approximately 19 km from the Toranagallu Railway station by road. Exploration of iron ore activity was started by the National Mineral Development Corporation of India in Donimalai and was commissioned in 1977. The ore available here contains 65% of Iron. According to the N.M.D.C. Website the mines have the capacity of 27.92 million tons. About 4 million tons of the ore is extracted per year. The ore is exported through Chennai and Mormugao (Goa) ports. About 1286 employees work here as on 30 April 2012. At present, the ban by Karnataka Govt., on exports has been lifted.

== Education ==
Kendriya Vidyalaya Donimalai was established in year 1974. It is a co-educational institution affiliated to CBSE and run by the Kendriya Vidyalaya Sangathan, New Delhi an autonomous body under the Ministry of Human Resource and Development, Govt. of India, New Delhi. It is a Project Sector Vidyalaya located in the well-maintained residential Township under the sponsorship of, National Mineral Development Corporation (NMDC). Over a span of 46 years, The Vidyalaya has won itself an unbeatable reputation of maintaining high educational standards and CCA activities with many students securing a high rank in various National events. Kendriya Vidyalaya, Donimalai started in the year 1974 (6 July 1974) with only few students. Now it has more than 1000 students, a staff strength of about 50 and classes starting from 1st to 12th.
