= Pokkunuru =

- Village
- Interactive map of Pokkunuru
- Coordinates: 16°39′25″N 80°09′35″E
- Country: India
- State: Andhra Pradesh
- District: NTR

Population (2001)
  - Total: 1,949

Languages
  - Official: Telugu
- Time zone: UTC+5:30 (IST)
- PIN: 521182
- Lok Sabha constituency: Vijayawada
- Vidhan Sabha constituency: Nandigama

Pokkunuru is a village in NTR district of the Indian state of Andhra Pradesh. It is located in Chandarlapadu mandal of Vijayawada revenue division. It is a part of Andhra Pradesh Capital Region.

"Andhra Pithamaha" Madapati Hanumantha Rao (1885–1970) social reformer of Hyderabad was born in this village.

== Education ==
The primary school education is imparted by the government school, under the State School Education Department.

== Politics ==
On 2013, Panchayat elections were conducted and Komati Prabhkarao is the present sarpanch from Telugu Desam Party.

== Demographics ==
According to Indian census, 2001, the demographic details of this village is as follows:

- Total Population: 1,949 in 442 Households.
- Male Population: 989
- Female Population: 960
- Children Under 6-years of age: 244 (Boys – 125 and Girls – 119)
- Total Literates: 1,217
