= Nekarikallu =

- Village
- Interactive map of Nekarikallu
- Location in Andhra Pradesh, India
- Coordinates: 16.371°N 79.943°E
- Country: India
- State: Andhra Pradesh
- District: Palnadu
- Mandal: Nekarikallu mandal

Government
  - Type: Panchayati raj
  - Body: gram panchayat

Area
  - Total: 1,529 ha (3,780 acres)

Population (2011)
  - Total: 10,778
  - Density: 704.9/km^{2} (1,826/sq mi)

Languages
  - Official: Telugu
- Time zone: UTC+5:30 (IST)
- PIN: 522615
- Area code: +91–8647
- Vehicle registration: AP

Nekarikallu is a village in Palnadu district of the Indian state of Andhra Pradesh. It is the headquarters of Nekarikallu mandal in Sattenapalli revenue division.

== Governance ==
Nekarikallu gram panchayat is the local self-government of the village. It is divided into wards and each ward is represented by a ward member.

== Education ==
As per the school information report for the academic year 2018–19, the village has a total of 14 schools. These include one KGBV, 2 other types, 7 Zilla Parishad/MPP and 4 private schools.
