= Water resources in India =

Annual average rainfall in India

Rivers and flood prone areas in India

India receives an average annual precipitation of 1,170 millimetres (46 in), amounting to approximately 4,000 cubic kilometres (960 mi^{3}) of rainfall or about 1,720 cubic metres (61,000 cu ft) of freshwater each year. The country accounts for 18% of the world's population but has access to only about 4% of the world's water resources. One of the proposed measures to address India's water challenges is the Indian Rivers Interlinking Project.

Approximately 80% of India's land area receives rainfall of 750 millimetres (30 in) or more annually. However, the distribution of rainfall is uneven, both temporally and geographically. Most rainfall occurs during the monsoon season, from June to September, with the northeastern and northern regions receiving significantly higher rainfall compared to the western and southern parts of the country.

Apart from rainfall, the melting of snow in the Himalayas after winter contributes to the flow of northern rivers, though the extent varies. In contrast, southern rivers exhibit greater seasonal variability in water flow. The Himalayan basin, in particular, experiences periods of flooding during some months and water scarcity in others.

Despite India's extensive river network, the availability of safe, clean drinking water and adequate water for irrigation remains a persistent challenge. This shortage is partly due to the limited utilisation of the country's surface water resources. As of 2010, India harnessed only 761 cubic kilometres (183 mi^{3}), or 20%, of its renewable water resources, with a significant portion sourced through unsustainable groundwater extraction.

Of the total water withdrawn from rivers and groundwater, approximately 688 cubic kilometres (165 mi^{3}) were allocated for irrigation, 56 cubic kilometres (13 mi^{3}) for municipal and drinking water purposes, and 17 cubic kilometres (4.1 mi^{3}) for industrial applications.

A significant portion of India falls under a tropical climate, which remains favourable for agriculture throughout the year due to warm and sunny conditions, provided a reliable water supply is available to offset the high rate of evapotranspiration from cultivated land. While the country's overall water resources are sufficient to meet its needs, the temporal and spatial variability in water availability necessitates the interlinking of rivers to bridge these supply gaps.

Approximately 1,200 billion cubic metres of water currently flow unused into the sea annually, even after accounting for the moderate environmental and salt-export requirements of all rivers. Ensuring food security in India is closely linked to achieving water security, which, in turn, depends on energy security. Adequate and reliable electricity supply is essential to power the water-pumping infrastructure required for the successful implementation of the rivers interlinking project.

Instead of relying on large-scale, centralised water transfer projects, which require significant time and resources to yield results, a more cost-effective alternative is the widespread use of shade nets over cultivated lands. This approach can enhance the efficient utilisation of locally available water resources throughout the year.

Plants utilise less than 2% of the total water for metabolic processes, while the remaining 98% is lost through transpiration, primarily for cooling purposes. The installation of shade nets or polytunnels, designed to withstand diverse weather conditions, can significantly reduce evaporation by reflecting excessive and harmful sunlight, thereby preventing it from directly impacting the cropped area.

== Drought, floods and shortage of drinking water ==
The precipitation pattern in India exhibits significant variation across regions and throughout the calendar year. A substantial portion of the country's rainfall, approximately 85%, occurs during the summer months, primarily due to the monsoon rains in the Himalayan catchments of the Ganges-Brahmaputra-Meghna basin. The northeastern region of India receives considerably heavier rainfall compared to the northwestern, western, and southern parts of the country.

The unpredictable onset of the annual monsoon, often characterised by prolonged dry spells and fluctuations in seasonal and annual rainfall, poses a significant challenge. Vast areas of the country remain uncultivated due to local water scarcity or poor water quality. India experiences alternating cycles of drought and flood years, with the western and southern regions being particularly prone to rainfall deficits and high variability. These conditions cause severe distress, especially for small and marginal farmers and rural communities.

The reliance on erratic rainfall, coupled with inadequate irrigation infrastructure in certain regions, often leads to crop failures and, in extreme cases, farmer suicides. Despite the abundance of rainfall during the monsoon season (June to September), several areas face drinking water shortages during other parts of the year. In some years, excessive rainfall results in devastating floods, causing widespread disruption and damage.

== Surface and groundwater storage ==
India currently stores only 6% of its annual rainfall, amounting to approximately 253 billion cubic metres (8.9×10^{12} cu ft), whereas developed countries strategically store up to 250% of their annual rainfall in arid river basins.

India heavily depends on groundwater resources, which support over 50% of the irrigated area, facilitated by the installation of nearly 20 million tube wells. To harness river waters and promote groundwater recharge, the country has constructed approximately 5,000 major and medium-sized dams, barrages, and similar structures.

The 59 most significant dams collectively offer a gross storage capacity of 170 billion cubic metres (6.0×10^{12} cu ft). Currently, about 15% of India's food production relies on rapidly depleting groundwater reserves. As the era of large-scale groundwater exploitation nears its end, there will be an increasing need for a shift towards surface water supply systems to meet agricultural and domestic water demands.

India is not facing a depletion of water resources; rather, a significant portion of its water flows out to the sea without being fully utilised for its potential benefits. The construction of land-based water reservoirs is highly expensive, primarily due to the costs associated with land acquisition, property compensation, and rehabilitation. To address the need for adequate water storage, coastal freshwater reservoirs constructed in the sea near river deltas offer a viable and cost-effective solution. This approach avoids issues related to land and forest submergence, making it a socially and economically favourable option for water conservation and management.

== Hydro power potential ==
Indian rivers possess significant hydropower potential, particularly as they descend from their source mountains, including the Himalayas, Western Ghats, Aravali Range, Vindhya Mountains, and Eastern Ghats, before their waters are consumed or flow into the sea.

The available hydropower potential varies over time, influenced by advancements in technology, the development of alternative power sources, changing priorities, and other limitations. Additionally, pumped-storage hydroelectricity potential can be economically developed by constructing embankment canals in conjunction with freshwater coastal reservoirs. This approach allows for the simultaneous harnessing of water resources to meet multiple needs while enhancing energy storage capabilities.

== Rivers ==
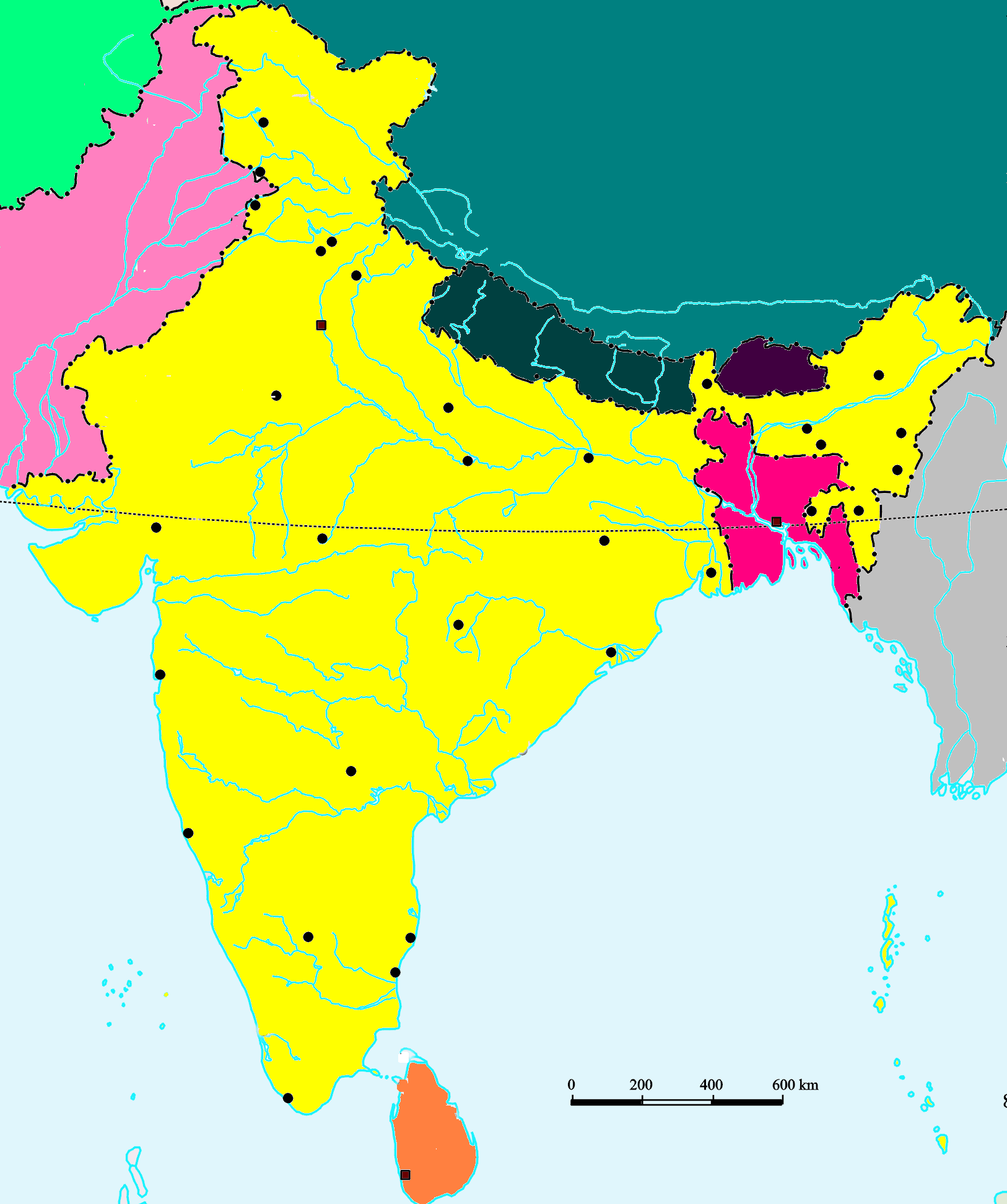
Map of India based on survey of rivers of India

The major rivers of India are as follows:

- Rivers flowing into the Bay of Bengal: Brahmaputra, Ganges, Mahanadi, Godavari, Krishna, Kaveri
- Rivers flowing into the Arabian Sea: Indus, Narmada, Tapti

== Lakes ==
The notable lakes in India include:

- Pulicat Lake
- Kolleru Lake
- Pangong Tso
- Chilika Lake
- Kuttanad Lake
- Sambhar Salt Lake
- Pushkar Lake

== Wetlands ==
India is a signatory to the Ramsar Convention, an international treaty aimed at the conservation and sustainable use of wetlands.

== Water supply and sanitation ==
Water supply and sanitation in India remain inadequate, despite long-standing efforts by various levels of government and local communities to improve coverage. Although investment in water and sanitation has been low by international standards, it has increased significantly since the 2000s, and access to these services has also expanded. For instance, rural sanitation coverage, which was estimated at 1% in 1980, reached 21% in 2008. Similarly, the proportion of Indians with access to improved sources of water rose from 72% in 1990 to 88% in 2008.

However, local government institutions responsible for operating and maintaining infrastructure are often considered weak and lack the financial resources to effectively carry out their responsibilities. Moreover, no major city in India is known to have a continuous water supply, and an estimated 72% of Indians still lack access to improved sanitation facilities.

Despite adequate average rainfall in India, large areas are prone to water scarcity and drought conditions. Additionally, there are many places where the quality of groundwater is poor. Another significant issue lies in the interstate distribution of rivers. The water supply to 90% of India's territory is provided by interstate rivers, leading to an increasing number of conflicts between states and across the country regarding water-sharing issues.

Several innovative approaches to improving water supply and sanitation have been tested in India, particularly in the early 2000s. These include demand-driven approaches in rural water supply since 1999, community-led total sanitation, public-private partnerships to enhance the continuity of urban water supply in Karnataka, and the use of micro-credit for women to improve access to water.

== Water quality issues ==
When sufficient salt export from a river basin to the sea is not ensured in an attempt to fully harness river water, it leads to the closure of the river basin. As a result, the available water in the downstream areas becomes saline and/or alkaline. Land irrigated with such saline or alkaline water gradually turns into saline or alkali soils.

Alkali soils have very poor water percolation, which leads to waterlogging issues. The spread of alkali soils forces farmers to cultivate only crops like rice or grasses, as the soil has low productivity for other crops and tree plantations. In saline soils, cotton is a preferred crop compared to many others, as most crops show poor yields under such conditions. In the northeastern states, high soil acidity caused by excessive rainfall negatively affects agricultural productivity.

Interlinking water-surplus rivers with water-deficit rivers is essential for the long-term sustainable productivity of river basins. This measure helps mitigate human-induced impacts on rivers by ensuring adequate salt export to the sea through environmental flows. Additionally, baseflows in rivers must be restored by curbing excessive groundwater extraction and augmenting surface water through canals. Such measures will help achieve adequate salt export to the sea and preserve water quality in river basins.

== Water disputes ==
There is intense competition for the available water in several interstate rivers, including the Kaveri, Krishna, Godavari, Vamsadhara, Mandovi, Ravi-Beas-Sutlej, Narmada, Tapti, and Mahanadi, among the riparian states of India. This competition arises due to the absence of water augmentation from surplus rivers such as the Brahmaputra, the Himalayan tributaries of the Ganga, and the west-flowing coastal rivers of the Western Ghats.

== Water pollution ==
Out of India's 3,119 towns and cities, only 209 have partial wastewater treatment facilities, and just 8 have full wastewater treatment facilities (WHO, 1992). A total of 114 cities discharge untreated sewage and partially cremated bodies directly into the Ganges River. Downstream, this untreated water is used for drinking, bathing, and washing. This situation is common for many rivers across India, although the Ganges River is comparatively less polluted.

=== Ganga ===
The Ganges River is the largest river in India. Its extreme pollution affects approximately 600 million people living near its banks. The river water begins to show signs of pollution as it enters the plains, with commercial exploitation increasing in proportion to population growth.

The towns of Gangotri and Uttarkashi exemplify this trend. Until the 1970s, Gangotri was a small settlement with only a few huts occupied by sadhus. However, in recent years, the population of Uttarkashi has increased significantly, reflecting the broader impact of urbanisation and human activities on the river’s ecosystem.

=== Yamuna ===
The Yamuna is one of the few sacred rivers in India, revered by many as a goddess. However, the river has come under extreme stress due to the exponential rise in the number of tourists and pilgrims, coupled with the growing population along its banks.

As a result of this rapid increase in human activity, the Yamuna has become severely polluted. The pollution has reached such an alarming level that the Government of India launched the Yamuna Action Plan to address and mitigate the river’s degradation.

== Water security ==
In India, there is intense competition for water resources from all interstate rivers, except the Brahmaputra River, among the riparian states. Additionally, water-sharing disputes extend to neighbouring countries, including Nepal, China, Pakistan, Bhutan, and Bangladesh.

A vast area of the Indian subcontinent experiences a tropical climate, which is favourable for agriculture due to warm and sunny conditions. However, a perennial water supply is essential to meet the high evapotranspiration rates from cultivated land.

Although the overall water resources in the subcontinent are sufficient to meet its needs, gaps in water supply persist due to the temporal and spatial variability of water distribution among states and neighbouring countries. Bridging these gaps is crucial for ensuring equitable water access and sustainable resource management.

There is intense competition for the water from interstate rivers such as the Kaveri, Krishna, Godavari, Vamsadhara, Mandovi, Ravi-Beas-Sutlej, Narmada, Tapti, and Mahanadi among the riparian states of India. This competition is primarily due to the lack of water augmentation from surplus rivers such as the Brahmaputra, the Himalayan tributaries of the Ganga, and the west-flowing coastal rivers of the Western Ghats.

During the intense summer season, when rainfall is minimal, all river basins experience severe water shortages, affecting even the basic drinking water needs of people, cattle, and wildlife.

Water security can be achieved alongside energy security, as linking surplus water areas with water-deficit regions through lift canals, pipelines, and other infrastructure will require a significant amount of electricity.

== Awareness and campaigns ==
In 2019, the Indian short film The Big Bang, written and directed by Lal Bijo, addressed the issue of water consumption. The film portrays a young man who is unaware of the value of water. One day, while attempting to collect water, he hears strange sounds nearby, becomes frightened, and runs away. The film highlights the importance of water conservation through its symbolic narrative.

== Water resource topics of India ==
- History of water supply and sanitation
  - Ancient water conservation techniques
  - Water supply and sanitation in the Indus-Saraswati Valley Civilisation
  - History of stepwells in Gujarat
  - Sanitation in ancient Rome
  - Traditional water sources of Persian antiquity
- Water resources in India
  - National Water Policy of India
  - Groundwater in India
  - Irrigation in India
  - List of rivers of India by discharge
    - List of dams and reservoirs in India
    - Indian Rivers Inter-link
    - Interstate River Water Disputes Act
    - National Waterways of India
- Water scarcity in India
  - Indian states ranking by drinking water
  - Water conservation in India
  - Kalpasar Project

== See also ==
- Environment of India
- List of rivers by dissolved load
- List of drainage basins by area
- List of rivers by discharge
