= List of rivers of India by discharge =

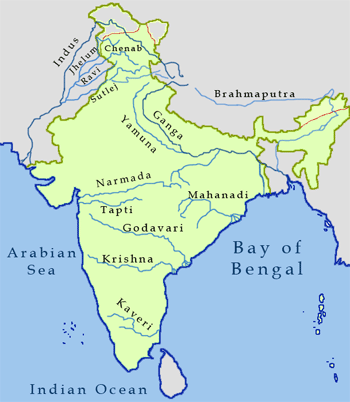
Major rivers of India.

There are more than 400 rivers in the Indian subcontinent. As per the classification of Food and Agriculture Organization, the Indian rivers are combined into 20 river units, which includes 14 major river systems and 99 smaller river basins grouped into six river units. They are grouped into four groups: Himalayan, Deccan, Coastal, and Inland drainage, based on their origin and drainage.

Most of the rivers in India originate from the four major watersheds in India. The Himalayan watershed is the source of the majority of the major river systems in India, including the three longest rivers: the Ganges, the Brahmaputra and the Indus. These three river systems are fed by more than 5000 glaciers.

The Aravalli Range running along the north-western part of India is the origin of a few of the smaller rivers. In Central India, rivers including the Narmada and Tapti rivers originate from the Vindhya and Satpura. In the peninsular India, the majority of the rivers originate from the Western Ghats in the west and flow towards the Bay of Bengal in the east, while a few rivers flow from east to west from the Eastern Ghats to the Arabian Sea. This is because of the difference in elevation of the Deccan Plateau, which slopes gently from the west to the east. The major peninsular rivers include the Godavari, the Krishna, the Mahanadi and the Kaveri.

Rivers by discharge
River	Region	Origin	Draining into	Length (km)	Drainage area (km^{2} thousands)	Discharge (km^{3}/yr) (Note: For rivers discharging into the sea, the discharge is based on calculations at stations located close to their mouths. For others, discharge is calculated at the confluence with the parent river.)	Measured at
Brahmaputra	Indo-Gangetic Plain	Himalayas	Bay of Bengal	2,880	630	670	Bahadurabad (Note: The Ganges splits into Hooghly and Padma Rivers after Farakka in West Bengal. The Hooghly flows into the Bay of Bengal near Kolkata. The Brahmaputra splits into two distributaries. In Bangladesh, the western branch merges with the lower Ganges to form the Padma River and the eastern branch joins with the Meghna River. The Padma and Meghna rivers converge to form the eastern part of the Ganges Delta and flow out into the Bay of Bengal.)
Brahmaputra	Indo-Gangetic Plain	Himalayas	Bay of Bengal	2,880	630	323	Dibrugarh
Ganges	Indo-Gangetic Plain	Himalayas	Bay of Bengal	2,525	935	380	Farakka
Indus	Indo-Gangetic Plain	Himalayas	Arabian Sea	3,180	1,165	197	Thatta (Note: The Indus River Delta is mostly in the Sindh province of Pakistan and the discharge is as measured close to its mouth.)
Godavari	Deccan	Western Ghats	Bay of Bengal	1,465	313	105	Rajahmundry
Ghagara	Indo-Gangetic Plain	Himalayas	Ganges	1,080	128	94	Revelganj
Yamuna	Indo-Gangetic Plain	Himalayas	Ganges	1,376	366	93	Prayagraj
Krishna	Deccan	Western Ghats	Bay of Bengal	1,400	259	68	Vijayawada
Mahanadi	Eastern Coastal Plains	Eastern Ghats	Bay of Bengal	900	142	67	False Point
Dibang	Indo-Gangetic Plain	Himalayas	Brahmaputra	324	13	63	Sadiya
Kosi	Indo-Gangetic Plain	Himalayas	Ganges	729	75	62	Kursela
Lohit	Indo-Gangetic Plain	Himalayas	Brahmaputra	560	24	60	Sadiya
Teesta	Indo-Gangetic Plain	Himalayas	Brahmaputra	414	14	60	Dalia
Subansiri	Indo-Gangetic Plain	Himalayas	Brahmaputra	518	33	54	Jamurighat
Gandak	Indo-Gangetic Plain	Himalayas	Ganges	814	46	52	Sonpur
Narmada	Central India	Vindhya and Satpura	Arabian Sea	1,312	99	41	Bharuch
Sone	Central India	Vindhya and Satpura	Ganges	784	71	32	Maner
Manas	Indo-Gangetic Plain	Himalayas	Brahmaputra	400	38	32	Jogighopa
Chambal	Central India	Vindhya and Satpura	Yamuna	1,024	25	30	Bhareh
Chenab	Indo-Gangetic Plain	Himalayas	Indus	890	26	29	Marala (Note: The Chenab joins with the Sutlej near Marala in Pakistan to form the Panjnad River, which later merges with the Indus.)
Jhelum	Indo-Gangetic Plain	Himalayas	Chenab	729	35	28	Mangla (Note: The Jhelum joins the Chenab river near Mangla in Pakistan.)
Kopili	Indo-Gangetic Plain	Himalayas	Brahmaputra	290	16	28	Hatiamukh
Jia Bhareli	Indo-Gangetic Plain	Himalayas	Brahmaputra	264	12	26	Tezpur
Kaveri	Deccan	Western Ghats	Bay of Bengal	800	88	21	Lower Anicut
Dhansiri	Indo-Gangetic Plain	Himalayas	Brahmaputra	352	12	20	Dhansirimukh
Sutlej	Indo-Gangetic Plain	Himalayas	Indus	1,450	–	17	Marala
Beas	Indo-Gangetic Plain	Himalayas	Sutlej	470	18	16	Harike

== See also ==
- Dissolved load
- Indian Rivers Inter-link
- Interstate River Water Disputes Act
- Irrigation in India
- List of dams and reservoirs in India
- List of drainage basins by area
- List of major rivers of India
- List of rivers by discharge
- National Water Policy
- Water scarcity in India
- Water supply and sanitation in India
- Water pollution in India
