= Jal Sahelis =

Jal Sahelis (translated as friends of water) are group of women from Bundelkhand who are engaged in reviving dry water bodies. The women in the group are illiterate or semi literate. Their hard efforts resulted in development of villages in the region in many ways.

== History ==
Jal Sahelis was formed in 2005 with group of women from Madhogarh village in Jalaun Tehsil of the Bundelkhand region. It is a group of around 1000 women engaged in improving 200 villages. Their efforts are spread over 7 districts in Madhya Pradesh and Uttar Pradesh. The women in the group are aged in the group of 18 years to 70 years. To resolve water crises they conduct meetings with local panchayat bodies. The women in the area earlier had to walk long distances for a pot of water and the area also lost agriculture productivity due to water shortages. Around 100 villages in four districts of Uttar Pradesh could resolve water issues due to their efforts. In 2022, they released a manifesto for political parties on environmental conservation.

== Efforts ==
Their efforts led to improvements in socio-economic development, in agriculture productivity, construction of a check dam, digging wells, constructing reservoirs, installing and repairing handpumps, creating soak pits, digging ponds, lake building, alleviation of caste-related fights over water.

== Award ==
- The United Nations Development Programme awarded the group with the Water Champion Award.

== See also ==
- Water scarcity in India
