= Water scarcity in India =

Water scarcity in India is an ongoing crisis that affects hundreds of millions of people each year. In addition to affecting the huge rural and urban population, the water scarcity in India also extensively affects the ecosystem and agriculture. India has only 4/100% of the world's fresh water resources with a population of over 1.4 billion people. In addition to the disproportionate availability of freshwater, water scarcity in India also results from drying up of rivers and their reservoirs in the summer months, right before the onset of the monsoons throughout the country. The crisis has especially worsened in the recent years due to climate change which results in delayed monsoons, consequently drying out reservoirs in several regions. Other factors attributed to the shortage of water in India are a lack of proper infrastructure and government oversight and unchecked water pollution.

Several large cities of India have experienced water shortages in recent years, with Chennai being the most prominent in 2019. The shortage of water affected the entire city of 9 million people and resulted in the closure of several hotels, restaurants and businesses. Large cities are not the only ones facing this risk. As per a report by WWF, out of the 30 Indian cities at risk of ‘severe water scarcity’ by 2050, 26 are midsized or small cities like Dhanbad, Nashik, and Jabalpur.

The acute shortage of water for daily needs has prompted many government and non government organizations to take stringent measures to combat the problem, including the Government of India forming an entire 'Jal Shakti' Ministry to deal with the problem. The government has also insisted on techniques such as rainwater harvesting, water conservation and more efficient irrigation as agriculture alone is responsible for 80% of the country's water usage.

Due to increasing demands, it is estimated that India will become a water scarce nation by 2025. According to a 2019 report by the National Institution for Transforming India (NITI Aayog), the best estimates indicate that India’s water demand will exceed supply by a factor of two by 2030.

== Impacts of water scarcity in India ==
=== People ===
The scarcity of water in India affects hundreds of millions of people across the country. A major portion of the population does not have a reliable and constant means of getting water for their daily needs. In June 2019, 65% of all reservoirs in India reported below-normal water levels, and 12% were completely dry. Since tap water is unavailable in many cities including some megacities such as Chennai, residents are reliant on alternative water sources. The country has scattered public water pumps but a lot of them are located far away from cities and their water flow is intermittent and unpredictable. A lot of Indians are forced with the option of spending money to buy drinking water but the poor sections of the society are unable to afford it on a daily basis which creates a massive problem of water scarcity for the rural population of India.

Limited accessibility to water is a threat to the people's health. Insufficient water has the capacity to deteriorate the health of an entire city in times of a water crisis. In the city of Latur, the depletion of more than 90% of water sources resulted in a major health crisis and people were forced to dig borewells into the ground, exposing themselves to dangerous chemicals and risking contamination. Some local residents were forced to consume polluted water sources due to the crisis at hand. In June 2016, the count of health problems skyrocketed in Latur, with multiple people showing symptoms of fever, infection, dehydration, vomiting, and kidney ailments. In addition to this health crisis, hospitals were unable to safely perform any surgery due to the increased threat of post-operative infections and complications resulting from a lack of clean drinking water.

A similar crisis emerged in Chennai in 2019 resulting in violent incidents and protests amongst the residents of the city. In June 2019 in Chennai, a woman was stabbed by her neighbor as she attempted to dig a borewell for water.

In February 2016, New Delhi was led to the brink of a severe water crisis by some Jat tribe demonstrators who purposefully damaged the Munak canal, a crucial source of water supply for the city. The protests were in retaliation to the Supreme Court judgement which cancelled Other Backward Class (OBC) quotas for them.

The water crisis in India was also exacerbated by the emergence of the so-called water mafia or 'tanker mafia'. Tanker mafia refers to private water tank owners who smuggle clean water illegally and sell it to local people at expensive prices. The tanker mafia is notorious in the city of Bhopal, where the mafia has been reported to bully poor residents and competing businesses, creating an atmosphere of social instability.

=== Ecosystem ===
Water scarcity also threatens the lives of wild animals across India. Wild animals are forced to infiltrate villages and cities in India as they attempt to find potable water. In 2016, the city of Mettur and Kolathur experienced an acute water shortage caused by a drought, which caused water bodies in nearby forests to dry out. Eventually, local wild animals like elephants, tigers, and spotted deer started to sneak into the cities in search of water. Some of these animals pose a threat to the citizens, as they can attack people. Some animals like spotted deer get physically attacked by dogs in the process, or they wind up injured or dead in accidents. In the Madurai district, the acute water shortage caused Indian gaurs to die by falling into wells as they looked for water.

=== Agriculture ===
Water is essential to the popular occupation of agriculture in India. Farmers are unable to produce crops in the absence of water. The drought in 2019 even destroyed the supplementary crops in addition to the winter crops. The scarcity of water has rendered a lot of valuable farmland in India completely useless and much of the farming industry in these regions has ceased to operate. In 2016, the city of Latur witnessed mass unemployment, where about half of its workforce was threatened to be unemployed as the agricultural industry struggled. Much of the local economy and farming regions nearly collapsed as the citizens were left with no choice but to use the polluted water. This implied reduced job opportunities in rural areas, which pushed citizens to move to the cities in search of jobs. Such a trend only adds pressure to the already strained infrastructure as the demand for water in large cities continues to increase.

== Reasons for Water Scarcity ==
=== Climate change ===
Monsoon is defined as a seasonal reversing wind accompanied by corresponding changes in precipitation. The North-East monsoon is responsible for 10%-20% rainfall of the total rainfall in India, while the South-West monsoon provides approximately 80% of rainfall. Therefore, the effects of climate change on the monsoon seasons is one of the important reasons for decrease in rainfall and water shortage in India. In recent years, monsoons in India have become more sporadic while also reducing in their length and hence reducing the total precipitation.

In 2018, the North-East monsoon decreased by 44% and the South-West monsoon was deficient by 10%. The summer South-West monsoon that usually results in rainfall from the months of June till September was delayed for 10 days, causing the rainfall in the area to decrease by 36 percent in comparison to the 50-year average. Because of the lower rainfall, water levels in reservoirs across the country decreased and led to extreme shortages of water in many major cities of India. During the first half year of 2019, 91 major reservoirs in the country recorded a 32% drop in their water capacity, resulting in disasters such as the Chennai Water Crisis

The economic impact of rising sea levels is substantially evident within India. The damage cost is estimated at between US$24 billion and US$36 billion. This is primarily due to the rate of high emissions in conjunction with the increasing instability of ice sheets. These rising emissions are a predominant factor behind why India is consequently facing higher temperatures. The ‘wet-bulb temperature’, an approximate tool that integrates heat and humidity is expected to be at a constant rate of 31 Celsius. That rate resembles an adverse impact on human life due to the impacts of climate change in relation to water.

=== Infrastructure issues ===
==== River pollution ====
Due to the lack of a long-term water management plan, many of the country's rivers either run dry or have been polluted. Although one of the most important river in India, the Ganges is also the one that is most severely polluted. The pollution mostly results from untreated sewage from densely populated cities, industrial waste as well as due to religious ceremonies in and around the river. The Ganges is a holy river in Hindu mythology and during religious festivals, over 70 million people bathe in the Ganges, believed to wash off their sins. The bones and ashes remaining after Hindu cremation are also thrown into Ganges along with other religious waste. Sometimes, half-cremated bodies are also thrown into the Ganges in order to let them decompose in water.

Although the Ganga Action Plan was launched in 1984 in a bid to clean the Ganges River within 25 years, the river is still highly polluted, with a high proportion of heavy metals and lethal chemicals that can even cause cancer. The unsatisfying result of the Ganga Action Plan has been attributed to a "lack of technical knowledge" and "misplaced priorities". Other cited reasons also include lack of maintenance of the facilities as well as an inadequate fees for the services.

==== Groundwater extraction and irrigation ====
India is the world's biggest groundwater user, extracting 251 billion cubic metres (251 cubic kilometres; 203 million acre-feet; 60 cubic miles) of groundwater in 2010, compared to 112 billion m^{3} (112 km^{3}; 91 million acre⋅ft; 27 mi^{3}) of groundwater extracted by the United States. From 2007 to 2017, the continued exploitation of groundwater caused the groundwater level in India to decrease by 61 percent, according to the Central Ground Water Board (CGWB). The unmonitored and unregulated extraction of groundwater has diminished and contaminated the water resources, and therefore threatens the people who depend on these water sources for their daily needs.

According to a report by NITI Aayog published in June 2018, at least 21 major Indian cities, including the capital New Delhi were set to completely run out of groundwater by 2020, based on the estimates of annual groundwater replenishment and its extraction without taking into account the groundwater availability in the deeper aquifers. Since the report, there have been reports of ground water shortage in the listed cities like Bangalore, Chennai and New Delhi. However since the initial report, there has also been variations in groundwater levels. Bangalore, for example, experienced replenished ground water levels in 2021 due to COVID lockdown induced reduced demand and significantly increased rainfall. However, this rise in ground water level is not considered to be a reversal of the downward trend. Bangalore is reporting ground water shortage again in 2023. The Ministry of Jal Shakti (MoJS) has since published a press release on the updated information of groundwater levels as of 2020 and the steps taken to avoid the situation, including artificial groundwater recharge, water harvesting and aquifer mapping and management programs. The 2018 report also noted that approximately 200,000 people die in India each year due to the lack of access to safe drinking water.

Groundwater meets more than half of the country's need of water supply, and nearly 89% of the groundwater extracted in India is used for irrigation. The traditional techniques of irrigation are also to blame for the water crisis as they result in a majority of water loss and evaporation during the irrigation process.

==== Wastage of water ====
According to the Central Water Commission, even though climate change has resulted in a reduction in rainfall and thereby the water supply, the country still receives enough rainfall to meet the needs of over 1 billion people. However, India only catches only 8 percent of its annual rainfall due to poor rainwater harvesting. Due to rapid urbanization, a lot of the ponds used to capture water have been lost due to the rising population and inefficient implementation of city planning guidelines.

India has also been lacking in the treatment of wastewater for reuse. Approximately 80 percent of domestic wastewater is drained out as waste and ends up flowing into other water bodies which lead to salt water sources such as the Bay of Bengal and the Arabian Sea. A study by Central Pollution Control Board, CPCB, estimated the sewage generation to be 72,368 million liters per day (MLD) with 31,841 MLD (42%) waste water treatment capacity of which only 20,235 MLD (28%) was utilized which accounts for only 75% of the operational capacity. The remaining water is released into the environment where it pollutes, spreads diseases and harms wildlife. Given that 80% of water supplied to urban areas returns as waste water, it has the potential to be treated and reused for industrial activities or crop irrigation, which relieves the water demand and also reduce pollution level. This would be especially effective considering that agriculture takes up 80% of water use in India. It has been estimated that the available waste water in 2021 could have potentially grown 28 million metric tons of selected produce amounting to INR 966 billion in revenue. Yet, it was reported that only top five states account for 60% of installed capacity with only ten states implementing treated waste water reuse policy. As India has increased the capacity of treatment plants by 40% from 2014 to 2020, the capacity is expected to grow from 42% treatment capacity in 2021 to 80% treatment capacity of waste water by 2050.

There have been criticisms of government policies surrounding waste water treatment, including for their lack of incentives, enforcement mechanisms, or usage specific quality standards. To address the poor state of state policies surrounding treatment of waste water, the central government released the National Framework on Safe Reuse of Treated Water in November 2022. It aims to set quality standards, monitoring and compliance measures for a broad range of its usage and recommends national and state level implementations. It also discusses challenges and various business models that can be adopted for the operation. Although the framework has been criticized for not providing clearly defined standards depending on use case, it is considered as a step in a good direction. The Ministry of Jal Shakti (MoJS) is said to be responsible for the overall interpretation, coordination and guidance of the framework.

== Efforts ==
=== Government efforts ===
The Government of India has reformed several of its departments and initiated several water supply projects in the last 3 years to respond to the country's growing water needs. The reforms include the establishment of a new ministry for water known as the Jal Shakti Ministry. The government also launched several projects in the main rivers and underground water sources. The Indian government has claimed that the new ministry and projects could increase the whole country's water use efficiency by 20% in addition to enhancing the capacity of its water reserves and protecting the currently over-exploited area.

==== Establish new ministry through department reorganization ====
In June 2019, Indian Prime Minister Narendra Modi launched a new plan, “Piped Water for All by 2024” in order to integrate different water resources management departments together to take charge of the ground and surface water depletion. The newly formed Jal Shakti ministry is responsible for publishing the policy guideline for water resources usage, regulating and leading the water resources related projects, and dealing with the cooperation, facilitation, and negotiation of water resources both internationally and in between states.

Prior to the formation of the Jal Shakti ministry, water resources in India were managed by different departments under the governance of either the local state government or the union government. The new ministry combines the Ministry of Water Resources, River Development and Ganga Rejuvenation with the former Ministry of Drinking Water and Sanitation. The government aims that this step will prevent various departments from conflicting and overlapping with each other. The Jal Shakti Ministry is responsible for managing the financial and technical resources, policy support and the pollution regulation deployment regarding the water resources throughout the country.

==== River Ganges cleaning programs ====
The Ganges, a popular holy river in India, feeds millions of people in North India. Despite the heavy reliance of public life on the river, it was named as one of the 10 most dangerous rivers in the world in 2007 due to water pollution.

The first Ganges cleaning program (Ganga Action Plan) was started in 1985 with an aim to tackle the problem of excessive water pollution in the river. The program was gradually expanded to look after the other rivers in India as well. Over the past 20 years, over £100m has been spent to mitigate the effect of industrial pollution on rivers and other water bodies. However, the Ganga Action Plan has not shown any significant results over the years. In 2018, the Central Pollution Control Board and National Green Tribunal of India reported that only 7% of the water region in the River Ganges is drinkable and only about 10% of the water can be used for bathing.

To combat the problem of government incompetence in solving the water crisis, the Modi government announced that it will be launching new projects with more investment along with formulating new policies to manage the pollution in the Ganges and other rivers in India.

=== Non-governmental efforts ===
India has a huge number of Non Government Organisations that focus on solving water shortage problems for the citizens in affected areas. Some of the organizations such as 'FORCE' and 'Safe Water Network' are actively involved in dealing with the water crisis in India. International organisations such as 'We are Water' and UNICEF also very active in alleviating the problems of basic water supply and sanitation in villages.

Most of the non-governmental organizations work on raising social awareness and establishing water resources projects for the heavily affected parts of the country.

==== Raising social awareness ====
Most non-governmental organizations consider raising social awareness as one of their main responsibilities. They are actively involved in teaching the locals how to preserve the water resources and how to increase the water usage efficiency by installing new water gathering stations and improving their irrigation techniques.

‘We are Water’ publishes documentary films every year broadcasting the severe water scarcity in India to raise social awareness. In its documentaries, We are Water highlights the main reasons for water scarcity in the country and how each civilian can work towards conserving water in their own homes. These documents are especially relevant in rural areas as the residents do not have direct access to government schemes.

==== Establishing water resources projects ====
A lot of non-governmental organisations in India are involved in establishing water harvesting structures in rural areas. For example, villagers in Palve Budruk, near Ahmednagar, developed a catchment plan covering 1,435 hectares – over 80% of the land available with support from UNICEF. The system consists of 3 dams, 20 canal bunds, two small percolation tanks linked to the main tank and 19 village ponds. Water stored in the percolation tank, is strictly meant for domestic use. Piped water is supplied for an hour a day in the morning, during which families are expected to fill up water for drinking and cooking.

The Jal Bhagirathi Foundation is one of the most prominent non profit organisations in India dealing with the issues of water scarcity in the desert terrains of Rajasthan. The foundation has covered over 550 villages and revived more than 2000 water harvesting structures in the region. The organisation claims to harvest over 4000 million litres of water every year along with reclamation of 100+ hectares of barren land. The organisation also works actively with schools in the region, providing safe water and sanitation facilities to them. The Jal Bhagirathi Foundation is also actively involved in raising awareness about water conservation and has been awarded numerous awards for its efforts.

=== Solutions and technologies ===
==== Rain collection ====
Rainwater harvesting is the name given to the innovative way of collecting rainwater in order to recharge the underground water. A lot of houses have built their own rainwater harvesting structures in order to be self sufficient. In Banglore, Biome Environmental Trust and Friends of Lakes launched citizen initiatives to dig up to 1 million recharging wells and connect them to the groundwater using funnels. The nonprofit organisations expect this initiative to collect as much as 60% of the total rainwater. A lot of government-supported start - ups such as NeeRain are also providing ways for collecting rainwater in order to recharge underground water reservoirs.

==== Coastal reservoirs ====
Coastal reservoir is a fresh/river water storage reservoir located on sea coast area near a river delta. It does not submerge the land area and there is no requirement of land acquisition and rehabilitation of displaced population. These multi purpose water storage reservoirs can be built at low cost to supply adequate water for all the water requirements such as irrigation, drinking, industrial, salt export, base flows, environmental flows, etc. benefiting all water deficit areas of India India is not running out of water but water is running out of India without reaping benefits from the available water resources in India.

==== Desalination ====
Desalination is a potential advanced technique to solve the problem of water shortage, especially in coastal regions. Desalination involves treating sea water to remove its salt content, making it fit for drinking. In the past decades, Israel has already developed a systematic method to desalinate the sea water into fresh water for industrial and domestic usage. India is already looking into installing desalination plants near the coastal regions to fulfil the water needs of cities such as Chennai.

==== Irrigation Techniques ====
Employing almost 44% of India's working population, agriculture is one of the most important occupations in India. Consequently, up to 80% of the groundwater in India is used for irrigation. The Indian Agriculture Institute has been promoting the drip irrigation technology to relieve the water scarcity in India for decades. The technology has the advantage of being applicable to all kinds of terrains in the country. Furthermore, the technique helps farmers use water more efficiently by modifying the water supply based on the moisture level of the soil. With the help of the Indian government, drip irrigation has seen a massive rise in implementation over the last 15 years. Currently, almost 351,000 hectares of irrigated land is under drip irrigation, compared to just 40 hectares in 1960s.

== Current events ==
=== 2019 Chennai water crisis ===
In June 2019, the Indian city of Chennai faced an acute water shortage after its four main water reservoirs ran completely dry. Chennai is India's sixth largest metropolis with a population of roughly nine million people. The dire shortage of water affected the huge population of Chennai very badly as hundreds of people waited in lines with empty water buckets for hours. Several restaurants and hotels in the city also shut down due to the shortage of water. Even the IT firms in the city otherwise known for its thriving IT and automobile sectors were forced to ask their employees to work from home as the crisis worsened. Out of the daily requirement of 830 million litres per day (220 million US gallons per day; 180 million imperial gallons per day), the city was only able to provide 525 million L/d (139 million US gal/d; 115 million imp gal/d). Chennai Metro Water was forced to cut short its daily water supply by 40% to deal with the ongoing crisis. The government responded by sending water tankers to residential areas. Water was also delivered to the city by a special train with the capacity to carry 10 million liters of water daily.

== See also ==
- Climate of India
- Environment of India
- Kalpasar Project
- List of rivers by dissolved load
- Ground water in India
- Indian Rivers Inter-link
- Interstate River Water Disputes Act
- Irrigation in India
- List of drainage basins by area
- List of rivers of India by discharge
- List of rivers by discharge
- List of dams and reservoirs in India
- Polavaram Project
- Pollution of the Ganges
- National Water Policy
- Saemangeum Seawall
- Water supply and sanitation in India
- Water pollution in India
