= Water pollution in India =

Water pollution

Water pollution refers to the contamination of water bodies (such as rivers, lakes, oceans, and groundwater etc.) by harmful substances or pathogens, making them unfit for human use or harmful to aquatic life. Water pollution comes from two sources: point or non-point sources. Point sources refer to a single identifiable source for the pollution, whereas non-point sources mean that the pollution comes from a variety of sources that are non-identifiable. There are numerous point and non-point sources, including industrial discharge, agricultural runoff, untreated sewage, and improper disposal of waste. The presence of pollutants in water can have serious environmental, health, and economic consequences.

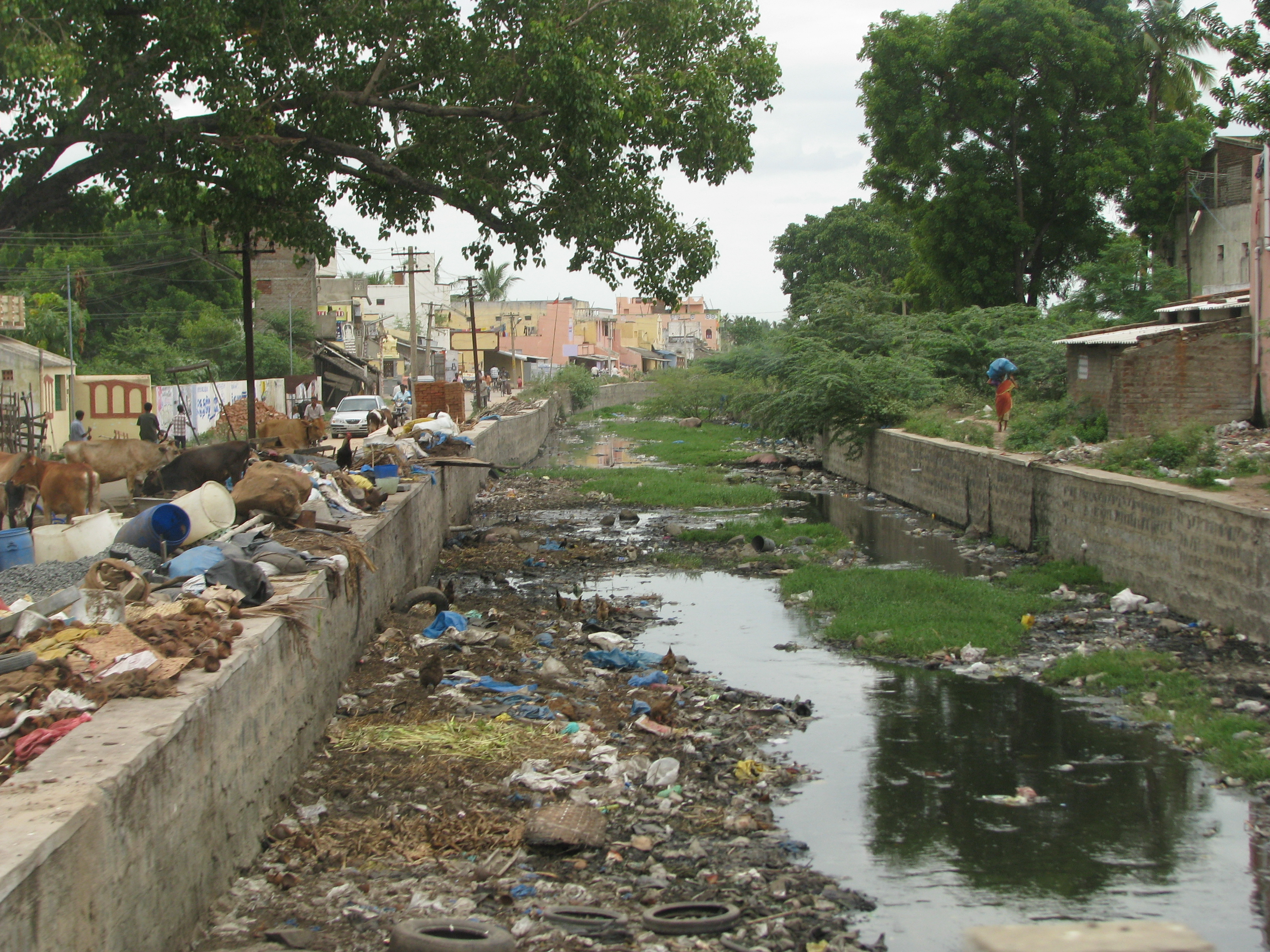
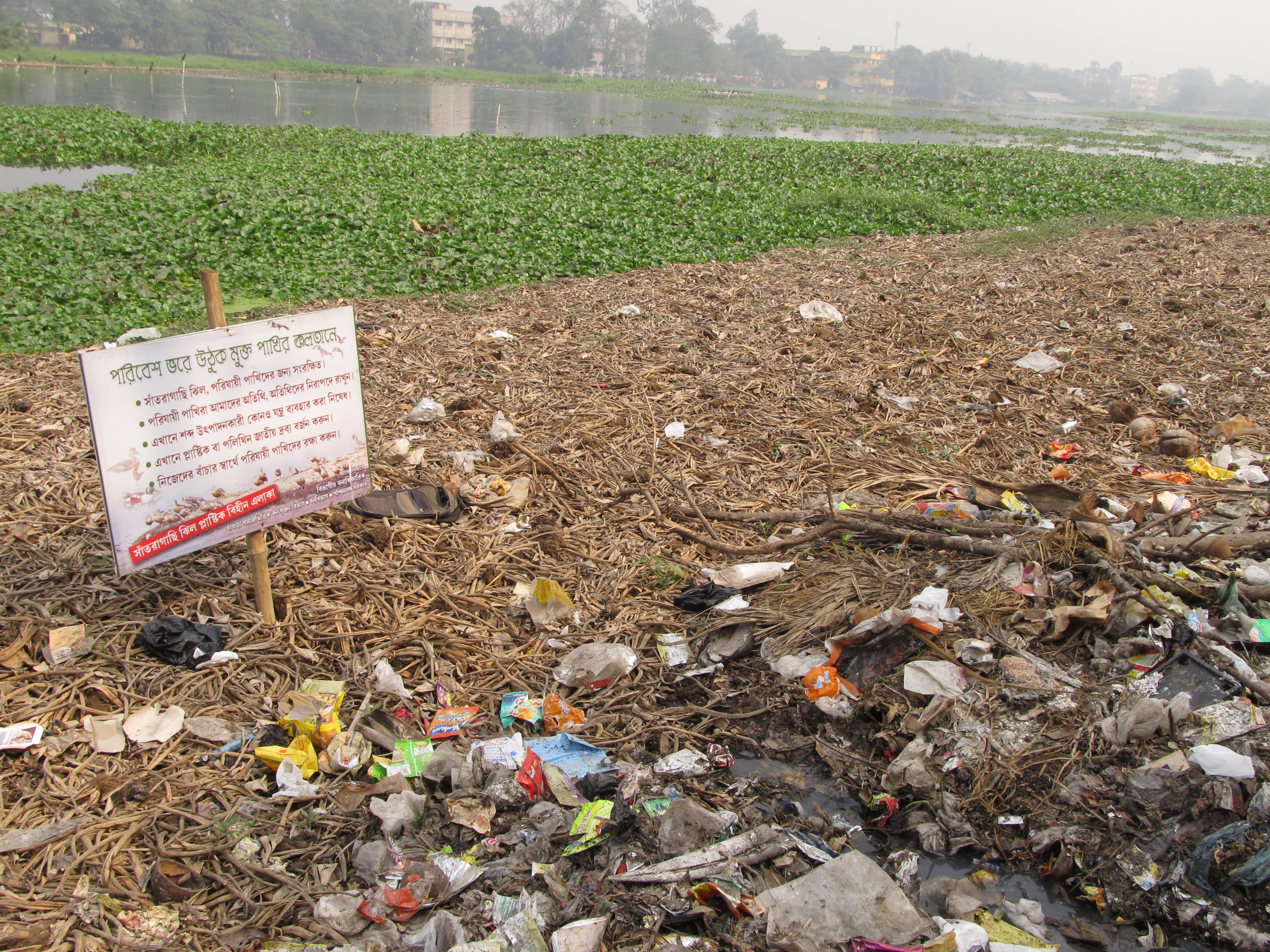
Canals, rivers and lakes in India often serve as dumping grounds for sewage, solid and liquid wastes. These are sources of water pollution, as illustrated in Tamil Nadu (above) and West Bengal (below).

Water pollution is a major environmental issue in India. India only holds about 4% of freshwater resources, yet nearly 70% of surface water in India is unfit for consumption. 163 million Indians lack access to safe drinking water and about 21% of communicable diseases are linked to poor quality water. The largest source of water pollution in India is untreated sewage. Other sources of pollution include agricultural runoff and unregulated small-scale industry. Most rivers, lakes and surface water in India are polluted due to industries, untreated sewage and solid wastes. Although the average annual precipitation in India is about 4000 billion cubic metres, only about 1122 billion cubic metres of water resources are available for utilization due to lack of infrastructure. Much of this water is unsafe, because pollution degrades water quality. Water pollution severely limits the amount of water available to Indian consumers, its industry and its agriculture.

== Water resources of India ==
India is one of the most water stressed countries in the world, with only 4% of freshwater resources. Water resources continue to dwindle, and while climate change is exacerbating this, there are issues of water pollution, which the following sections will tackle. In India, there are two main types of water resources: surface water and groundwater.

Surface water refers to the water in rivers, lakes, wetlands, and reservoirs. The main surface water bodies in India is the Ganges, Brahmaputra and the Barak, which account for 60% of the surface water in India. India divides its surface water into 22 basins. The Ganges is the longest river in India, flowing across 11 states, but India additionally has a variety of lakes, with nearly 1,000 large and medium-sized lakes. Groundwater refers to the water under the surface, stored in aquifers. This accounts for nearly 40% of usable water in India. Groundwater in India is classified into 14 system and these are subdivided into 42 major aquifers.

== Quality of water resources ==
=== The Ganges ===
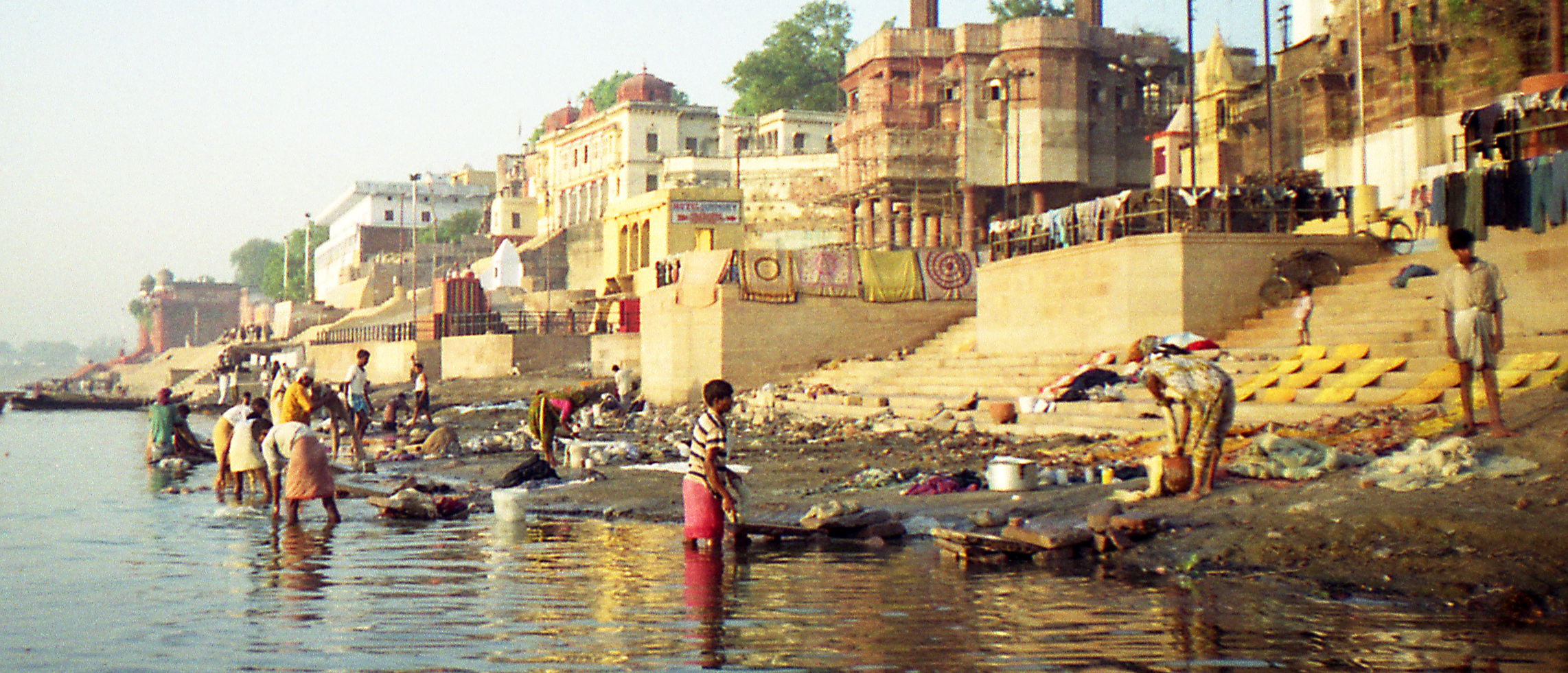
The ghats of river Ganges are polluted.

More than 500 million people live along the [Ganges] River. An estimated 2,000,000 persons ritually bath daily in the river, which is considered holy by Hindus. Ganges river pollution is a major health risk.

NRGBA was established by the Central Government of India, on 20 February 2009 under Section 3(3) of the Environment Protection Act, 1986. It also declared Ganges as the "National River" of India. The chair includes the Prime Minister of India and Chief ministers of states through which the Ganges flows.

=== The Yamuna ===
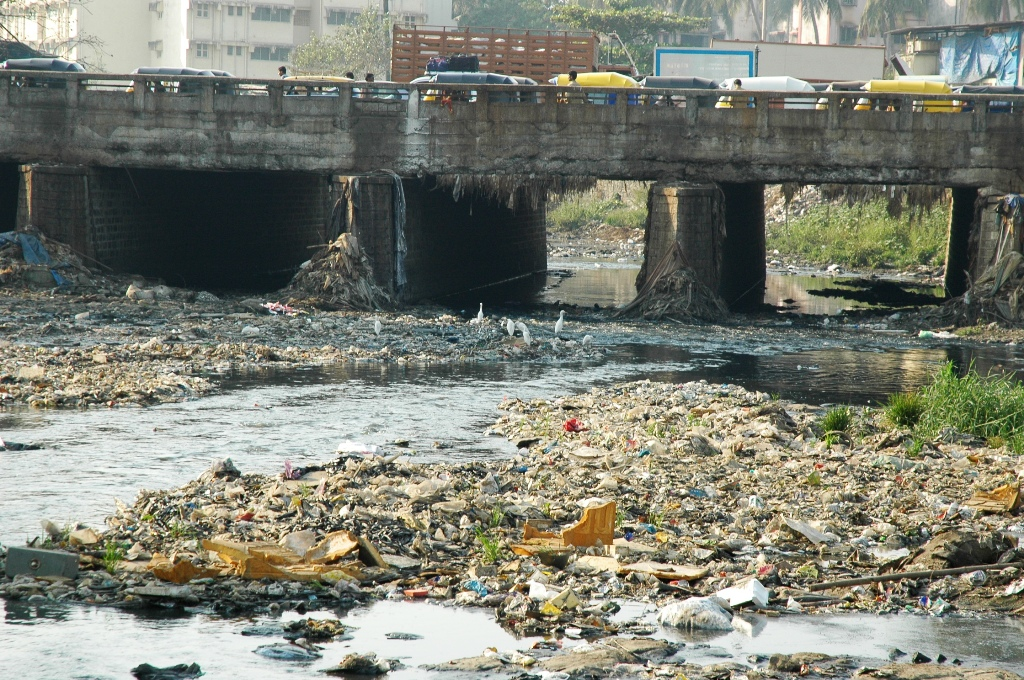
The Oshiwara River is severely polluted with solid and liquid waste generated by Mumbai.

By an estimate by 2012, Delhi's sacred Yamuna river contained 7,500 coliform bacteria per 100cc of water. A number of NGOs, pressure groups, eco-clubs, as well as citizens' movements, have been active in their task to clean the river.

Even though India revised its National Water Policy in 2002 to encourage community participation and decentralize water management, the country's complex bureaucracy ensures that it remains a "mere statement of intent." Responsibility for managing water issues is fragmented among a dozen different ministries and departments without any coordination. The government bureaucracy and state-run project department has failed to solve the problem, despite having spent many years and $140 million on this project.

=== Other Notable Rivers ===
- Buddha Nullah, a seasonal water stream, which runs through the Malwa region
- Jojari River, it is a river in Rajasthan polluted due to disposal of untreated industrial effluent in it
- Mithi River, which flows through the city of Mumbai, is heavily polluted.
- Mithi River, which has been degraded through industrial waste, but the Municipal Corporation of Mumbai has dedicated efforts to cleaning.
- Mula River, which has led to flash flooding due to the accumulation of waste at the banks of the river.
- Musi River, which is ranked the 22nd most polluted river in the world.
- Gomti River, which flows through numerous human settlements, contributing to pollution and waste.
- Vrishabhavathi River, which is heavily polluted because of the sewage drainage.

=== Organic matter ===
In 2010, the water quality monitoring found almost all rivers with high levels of BOD (a measure of pollution with organic matter). The worst pollution, in decreasing order, were found in river Markanda (490 mg/L BOD), followed by river Kali (364), river Amlakhadi (353), Yamuna canal (247), river Yamuna at Delhi (70) and river Betwa (58). For context, a water sample with a 5-day BOD between 1 and 2 mg O/L indicates a very clean water, 3 to 8 mg O/L indicates a moderately clean water, 8 to 20 indicates borderline water, and greater than 20 mg O/L indicates ecologically unsafe, polluted water.

The levels of BOD are severe near the cities and major towns. In rural parts of India, the river BOD levels were sufficient to support aquatic life.

=== Coliform levels ===
Coliform levels indicate possible contamination from sources such as animal waste and sewage, and the goal of drinking water is to have 0 coliform levels. Rivers Yamuna, Ganga, Gomti, Ghaghara, Chambal, Mahi, Vardha and Godavari, are amongst the other most coliform polluted water bodies in India. For context, coliform must be below 104 MPN/100 mL, preferably absent from water for it to be considered safe for general human use, and for irrigation where coliform may cause disease outbreak from contaminated-water in agriculture.

In 2006, 47 percent of water quality monitoring reported coliform concentrations above 500 MPN/100 mL. During 2008, 33 percent of all water quality monitoring stations reported a total coliform levels exceeding those levels, suggesting recent effort to add pollution control infrastructure and upgrade treatment plants in India, may be reversing the water pollution trend.

Treatment of domestic sewage and subsequent utilization of treated sewage for irrigation can prevent pollution of water bodies, reduce the demand for fresh water in the irrigation sector and become a resource for irrigation.

=== Toxic metal contamination ===
Toxic metal contamination from arsenic, lead, iron, and copper, is a common issue in India due to the geological composition and industrial waste. According to the Central Water Commission, in 2022, nearly 81 rivers and tributaries in India have found trace elements of heavy metal contamination. 43% of the river monitoring systems had alarming levels of one or more toxic metals. The Ganga River, was found to be the most polluted.

== Causes of pollution ==
In India, water pollution comes from a variety of point and non-point sources, affecting all bodies of water, including surface and groundwater. The main causes of pollution at industrial discharges, inadequate waste management, and agricultural runoff.

=== Untreated sewage ===
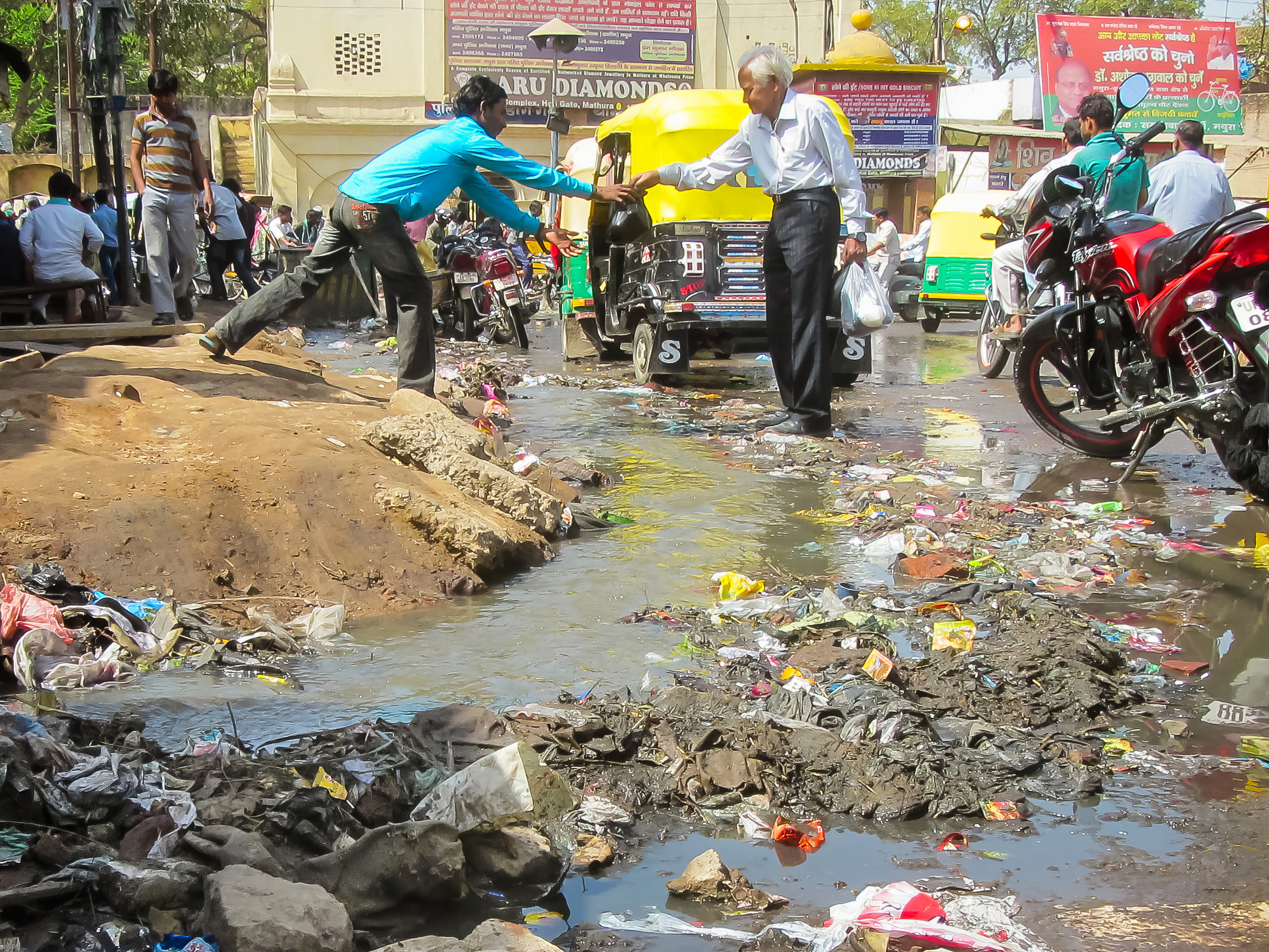
A street in Mathura overflowing with sewage and garbage in 2011

There is a large gap between generation and treatment of domestic waste water in India. The problem is not only that India lacks sufficient treatment capacity but also that the sewage treatment plants that exist do not operate and are not maintained. Sewage discharged from cities, towns and some villages is the predominant cause of water pollution in India. Investment is needed to bridge the gap between the sewage India generates and its treatment capacity of sewage per day. In urban India, everyday there is about 72.3 million litres of wastewater produced, but only 28% of this is actually treated. As these urban centers continue to grow, sewage systems in India will be unable to cope. The problem is compounded by a series of issues, mainly stemming from an inadequate waste management system. India generates approximately 62 million tonnes of waste in a year, which only about 80% is collected. The large amount of waste generated is unable to be processed, due to a lack of waste collection systems, lack of recycling facilities, and improper disposal practices. The rest of the waste ends up in the environment, including in water bodies in India. The sewage system and waste water treatment system is no better. The majority of the government-owned sewage treatment plants remain closed most of the time due to improper design or poor maintenance or lack of reliable electricity supply to operate the plants, together with absentee employees and poor management. The waste water generated in these areas normally percolates into the soil or evaporates. The uncollected waste accumulates in the urban areas causing unhygienic conditions and releasing pollutants that leach into surface and groundwater.

Sewage is not a waste product and it can be converted into wealth economically in a circular economy by using the aquatic life cycle of mosquitoes and non-biting midges. Organic matter in the sewage is consumed and transformed as adult mosquitoes and midges which can be used as fish/poultry meal.

When this waste gets into the water bodies, the high levels of carbon, nitrogen, and phosphorus stimulate microbial growth, which in turn depletes the oxygen leading to eutrophication, which is harmful to aquatic life. In the case of human health, the increased bacteria loads in water, can lead to dangerous diseases. A large number of Indian rivers are severely polluted as a result of discharge of domestic sewage, such as the Ganges, which is the largest river in India.

=== Agricultural run-off ===
Since the Green Revolution, pesticide and fertilizer use in India has become commonplace, increasing food production, but additionally contributing to water pollution. In nitrogen based fertilizers, runoff has significantly impacted the water quality of the groundwater in India. Nitrate pollution is a primary concern in India, particularly for farming states such as Rajasthan, Karnataka, and Tamil Nadu. The overuse of these fertilizers has led to nearly 56% of India's districts exceeding the safe limit of nitrate in their groundwater.

Pesticides are a major contaminant of water bodies in developing countries. Pesticides are chemicals that are used to combat against pests including weeds and insects. These chemicals contain large amounts of substances that are harmful to human and animal life, but additionally can last in soil and water bodies. Many pesticides have been banned all over the world due to their environmental damage such as Dichlorodiphenyltrichloroethane (DDT), Aldrin and Hexachlorocyclohexane (HCH), but are still commonly used as a cheap and easily available alternative to other pesticides in India. India has used over 350,000 million tonnes of DDT since 1985, even though DDT was banned in 1989. Only about 15% of pesticide reach their intended target due to leaching, sprays, and runoff. The introduction of agrochemicals like HCH and DDT into water bodies can cause bioaccumulation in water bodies, since these chemicals are resistant to degradation. These chemicals are a part of Persistent Organic Pollutants (POPs), which are potential carcinogens and mutagens. The levels of POPs found in several Indian rivers are well above the WHO permissible limit.

A study by the Punjab Pollution Control Board in 2008, revealed that in villages along the Nullah, fluoride, mercury, beta-endosulphan and heptachlor pesticide were more than permissible limit (MPL) in ground and tap water. Plus the water had high concentration of COD and BOD (chemical and biochemical oxygen demand), ammonia, phosphate, chloride, chromium, arsenic and chlorpyrifos pesticide. The ground water also contains nickel and selenium, while the tap water has high concentration of lead, nickel and cadmium.

=== Industrial wastewater and waste ===
India is one of the most attractive destinations for industrial investment due to its large consumer base and cheap labor. As a result, there has been a quick expansion of industry, but regulations have not kept pace with this expansion, leading to issues of water contamination. In India, there is a significant amount of industrial wastewater that is dispersed into rivers and water bodies, leading to increased processes of eutrophication and altering ecosystem services.

From 2016 to 2017, it is estimated that 7.17 million tonnes of hazardous waste was produced by industrial plants. The Central Pollution Control Board (CPCB) reported that as of 2016, there were 746 industries directly depositing wastewater into the Ganga, which is the largest river in India. This wastewater contains heavy metals such as lead, cadmium, copper, chromium, zinc, and arsenic, which negatively affect both aquatic life as well as human health. Bioaccumulation of these metals can cause several adverse effects on health such as impaired cognitive function, gastrointestinal damage, or renal damage.

Flooding during monsoons worsens India's water pollution problem, as it washes and moves solid waste and contaminated soils into its rivers and wetlands.

== Effects of water pollution in India ==
Water pollution in India has several detrimental effects on both the environment and public health.

=== Health impacts ===
Contaminated water is a significant cause of waterborne diseases such as cholera, typhoid, and hepatitis. These diseases lead to illness, hospitalization, and even death among the population exposed to polluted water sources. In a study conducted from 2011 to 2015 and from 2016 to 2020, it was reported that there was 263 deaths from cholera in India. The majority of the cases came from Maharashtra, Punjab, West Bengal, Karnataka and Madhya Pradesh. Other diseases from contaminated water include typhoid, which has a rate of 500-700 per 10,000 people in India, diarrhoea, which has an infant mortality rate of 9% for ages 0–59 months, and Hepatitis A.

In India, annually about 37.7 million are impacted by waterborne illness, and they have caused 10,738 deaths from 2017 to 2022.

=== Environmental degradation ===
Pollutants like heavy metals, pesticides, and industrial chemicals harm aquatic ecosystems. They disrupt the balance of ecosystems, leading to the decline of fish and other aquatic organisms, loss of biodiversity, and degradation of habitats.

Freshwater is important for biodiversity and the maintenance of vital ecosystem services in India. Water contamination tends to diffuse over a wide area, leading to various catchments and river systems to be contaminated. When species come into contact with these contaminants, they can be poisoned and concentrate toxic chemicals. In the case of agricultural fertilizers, this can cause a release of high amounts of nitrates and phosphate, which can lead to eutrophication in water bodies.

=== Economic costs ===
Water contamination in India has high economic costs, due to the health and environmental impacts of it. The cost of environmental degradation due to water contamination is estimated to be $80 billion a year, whereas the health costs are estimated to be $6.7-8.7 billion per year. The health impacts of water contamination can be extremely high for individual households. In Ludhiana, Punjab, the per capita cost for lower income households is approximately INR 3,385.90. In Kolkata, this amount on average in INR 1,168.08.

=== Impact on drinking water ===
Drinking water is a human right and vital for life. Yet, water contamination in India critically impedes safe drinking water, especially for vulnerable populations. In 2019, the Government announced the Jal Jeevan Mission, which aims to catalyze safe drinking water for every rural household by 2030, but progress has been slow. However, safe drinking water management in India has increased from 61% to 71% from 2001 to 2017.

One of the largest impacts on drinking water comes from the groundwater contamination. Nearly 85% of rural drinking water comes from the groundwater, and yet the groundwater is significantly contaminated with nitrates, heavy metals, microbes, and industrial toxins. This contaminants have been leading to an increase of developmental disorders and waterbourne illnesses among the rural populations in India.

=== Impact on agriculture ===
Agricultural runoff containing pesticides and fertilizers contaminates water sources and affects soil fertility. This leads to reduced crop yields and impacts food security.

Due to the increasing urbanization, many small-holder farmers are turning to irrigate their crops with untreated wastewater. Using contaminated water on crops has a significant impact on crop production, leading to the absorption of harmful substances and toxic residues. This can lead to an increase of food bourne illnesses, but additionally contribute to a declining productivity of farms in India.

=== Impact on vulnerable populations ===
Disparities in water access and contamination exist greatly in India, most notably along the rural-urban divide. For example, while about 90% of the urban population in India has access to safe water, this number decreases to approximately 50% in rural areas.

For these rural populations, access to safe water decreases significantly for tribal populations as well. Only about 20% of Scheduled Tribe households have access to drinking water on their premises, and 33% must travel far distances to receive this water.

For these households, the quality of water has been deteriorating—leading to developmental disorders and diseases. For example, in the village of Gangnauli, located approximately 180 km from the capital city of New Delhi, nearly 1/3 of youth are sick from water contamination. 71 people died from cancer between 2013 and 2018 in this village, and in 2017 the NGT, the environmental court of India, confirmed that the water was the source of the widespread illnesses in the village. This village does not have a piped water supply, and rather relies on water from handpumps. The water is contaminated from a wide variety of sources, including the industry located in the urban centers nearby, who dump their waste into the tributaries, leading to groundwater contamination. In the groundwater here, there were extremely high levels of mercury and lead at 0.115 mg/litre and 0.12 mg/litre, respectively. The water crisis is compounded by the lack of public health infrastructure in the region, which is not equipped to deal with an issue of this magnitude. Vulnerable populations such as rural and tribal groups in India are significantly more exposed to issues of water contamination due to these issues of lackluster public health services.

== Solutions ==
=== Restoration and conservation ===
Water conservation in India is gaining pace. The central government started the Namami Gange program in 2014 to clean up the Ganga river. The Chennai River Restoration Trust's efforts to clean the Cooum, Adyar rivers in Chennai and civil society efforts spearheaded by organizations like Environmentalist Foundation of India (E.F.I) to clean lakes and ponds in the country are seen as significant development towards water conservation. In Coimbatore, Tamil Nadu, Siruthuli was created in 2004 for the restoration of water bodies. They have launched a program called Waste Wise, to educate citizens on how to repurpose waste and are designing a system to limit liquid waste from getting into water bodies.

Nationally, the Ministry of the Environment and Forests launched the National River Conservation Plan to protect rivers from pollution and the National Lake Conservation Program to protect lakes. In 2019, the government of India additionally released the Jal Jeevan Mission, which aims to place taps of drinkable water into each rural household by 2024. While this initiative is not directly related to water pollution, drinkable water is an important issue in India due to the contamination of water bodies and sources.

=== Monitoring ===
The Central Pollution Control Board, a Ministry of Environment & Forests Government of India entity, has established a National Water Quality Monitoring Network comprising 1,429 monitoring stations in 28 states and 6 in Union Territories on various rivers and water bodies across the country. This effort monitors water quality year round. The monitoring network covers 293 rivers, 94 lakes, 9 tanks, 41 ponds, 8 creeks, 23 canals, 18 drains and 411 wells distributed across India. Water samples are routinely analysed for 28 parameters including dissolved oxygen, bacteriological and other internationally established parameters for water quality. Additionally 9 trace metals parameters and 28 pesticide residues are analysed. Biomonitoring is also carried out on specific locations. However, despite the advances in technology and networks, water contamination monitoring in India is severely hampered by funding, infrastructure, and data transparency.

=== Sewage and MSW treatment ===
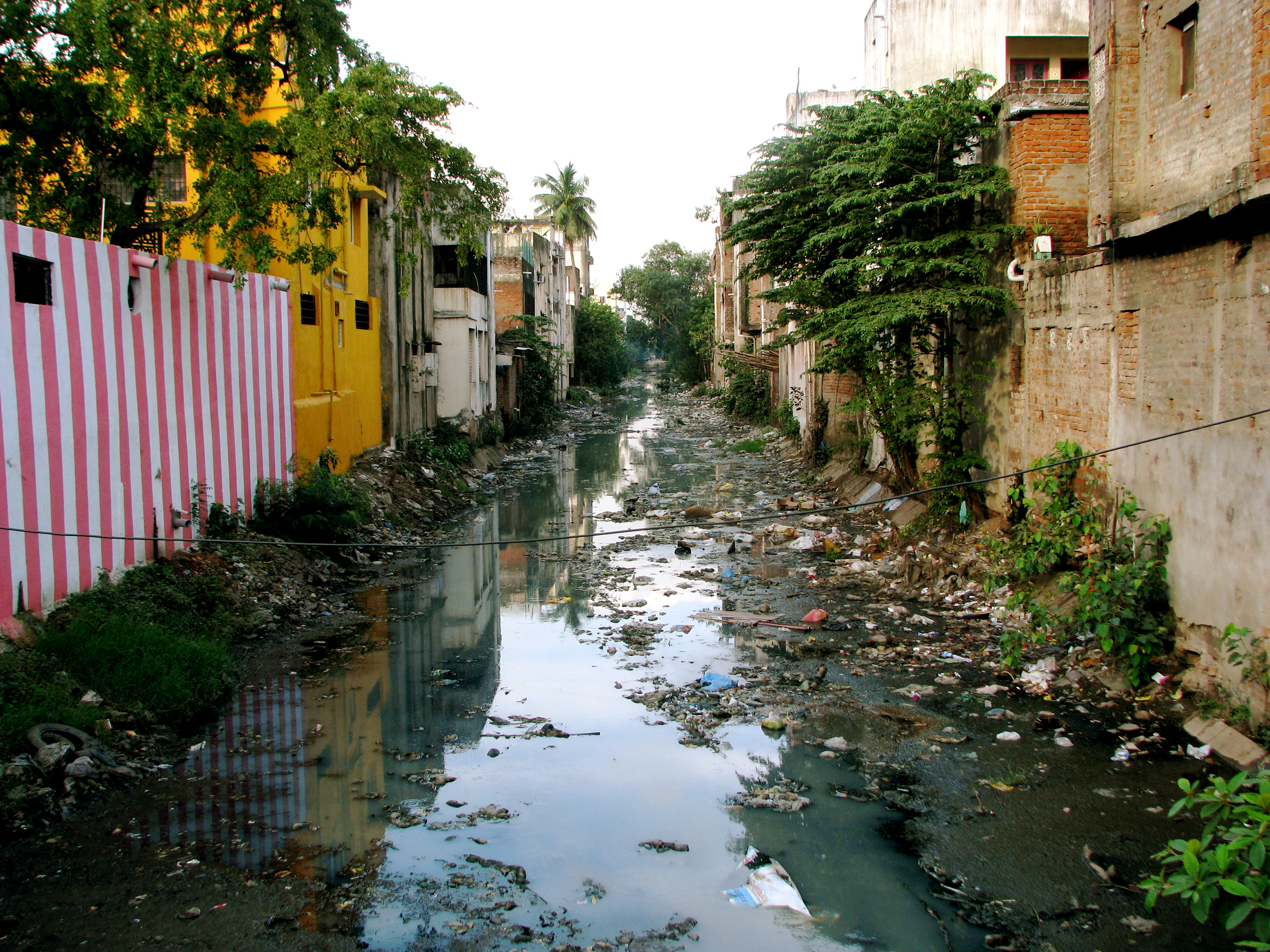
A polluted canal in a neighborhood in India.

There is a huge gap between the sewage generated in India and the sewage treatment capacity of the country. The central government has largely left it up to the state governments to manage wastewater treatments, which has led to huge disparity in the management of wastewater amongst the several states. However, approximately 815 sewage treatment plants (STPs) are under development or have been planned in the last six years. This has increased the percentage of urban sewage treated from 37% in 2015 to 50% in 2021. There has also been an effort to encourage the reuse or recycling of treated wastewater in agriculture or industrial purposes to reduce the strain on groundwater resources.

Other technologies to treat municipal wastewater have also been explored. Natural wetlands have shown to be a good alternative to STPs to remove 76-78% of organic waste, 77-97% of nutrients, and 99.5-99.9% of microbes from wastewater. Decentralised Wastewater Treatment Systems (DEWATS) have been adopted in some parts of India and have also shown to be an economically feasible alternative to STPs, considering the cost of installing and maintaining an STP is high. The quality of the effluent discharged by the plants was found to be within the permissible limits of the CPCB.

Since 2005, Indian wastewater treatment plant market has been growing annually at the rate of 10 to 12 percent. The United States is the largest supplier of treatment equipment and supplies to India, with 40 percent market share of new installation. At that rate of expansion, and assuming the government of India continues on its path of reform, major investments in sewage treatment plants and electricity infrastructure development, it was estimated India will nearly triple its water treatment capacity by 2015, and treatment capacity supply will match India's daily sewage water treatment requirements by about 2020.

=== Industrial wastewater treatment ===
Industrial wastewater is highly unregulated in India. However, several initiatives have been taken by the government to prevent industrial pollution of water resources. Zero liquid discharge (ZLD) is a water treatment process to eliminate liquid waste from industries that release very polluted wastewater, such as the fertiliser sector and distilleries. ZLD has been encouraged by the government and since implemented at some large industrial plants like Unilever and P&G, but installation costs and failure to process large amounts of dissolved solids in wastewater are a huge deterrent for industrial plants to adopt this technology.

== See also ==
- Alkali soil
- Environmental impact of irrigation
- Environmental issues in India
- Indian states and union territories ranked by prevalence of open defecation
- Ground water in India
- Interstate River Water Disputes Act
- Irrigation in India
- National Water Policy
- Water resources in India
- Water scarcity in India
- Water supply and sanitation in India
- Ghazipur landfill
- Bhalswa landfill
