= 2019 Chennai water crisis =

2019 water crisis in Chennai

The 2019 Chennai water crisis was a water crisis occurin India, most notably in the coastal city of Chennai in Tamil Nadu. On 19 June 2019, Chennai city officials declared that "Day Zero", or the day when almost no water was left, had been reached, as all the four main reservoirs supplying water to the city had run dry. Two years of deficient monsoon rainfall, particularly in late 2017 and throughout much of 2018, had led to this crisis. On this day, the 11.2 million people of Chennai went without any drinking water. Because tap water has stopped running, some families relied on alternative water sources such as distant, unreliable public water pumps, and costly private water tankers.

== Background ==
The four reservoirs

Chennai is a city of over 11 million people, around the size of New York City, and is the fourth largest city in India. The city is an automotive engineering hub and contains many automotive factories that are built around the reservoirs of the city. Chennai's population has increased from 500,000 people to more than 10 million in just the last century. Mismanagement of the city’s water resources and weak monsoons for the last four years reduced the city’s reservoirs to 0.1% of normal capacity in June 2019. Water became a valuable resource in Chennai and experienced exploitation as wealthier residents paid to dig deep bore wells on their land and sold water to other residents or businesses. This practice was allowed by the government and resulted in the groundwater aquifer to be drained dramatically at twice the level of annual recharge. Protests erupted over the Chennai government’s lack of action on the issue as the water was no longer a basic human right in Chennai. The government also faced pressure on their management of the city’s four main reservoirs; Poondi, Cholavaram, Redhills and Chembarambakkam. Factories and infrastructure built in the catchments of these reservoirs were unregulated and therefore much of the rain that fell ended up in the ocean or used in excess by these factories. This further exacerbated the issue and limited the amount of water that entered the reservoirs for public consumption. Monsoon rains in 2019 have been more plentiful than in years past and have raised the reservoir levels to around 30% capacity. Chennai has declared itself water secure because of the recent rains but concern remains about the future of water security in Chennai and many other Indian cities such as Bangalore which have similar regulation issues. An Indian government think tank predicted that 21 Indian cities will be out of groundwater by 2020, and the impact of future droughts in India brought upon by climate change will put the entire country at risk unless stronger regulations are put in place. Furthermore, Chennai faces extremely high levels of baseline water stress, indicating that in general and on average, over 80% of the available water supply is used every year by agriculture, industries, and individual consumers.

Chennai has historically relied on annual monsoon rains to replenish its water reservoirs since the rivers are polluted with sewage. However, when this crisis occurred and Day Zero was declared, the expected monsoon was still months away.

There are four reservoirs in the city, namely, Red Hills, Cholavaram, Poondi, and Chembarambakkam, with a combined capacity of 11,057 mcft. From December 2018 through January 2019, these four reservoirs were recorded to have 17% of their normal water storage. Additionally, the Poondi reservoir began receiving water deliveries in 2004; however, only a tenth of their normal amount of water was delivered in early 2019.

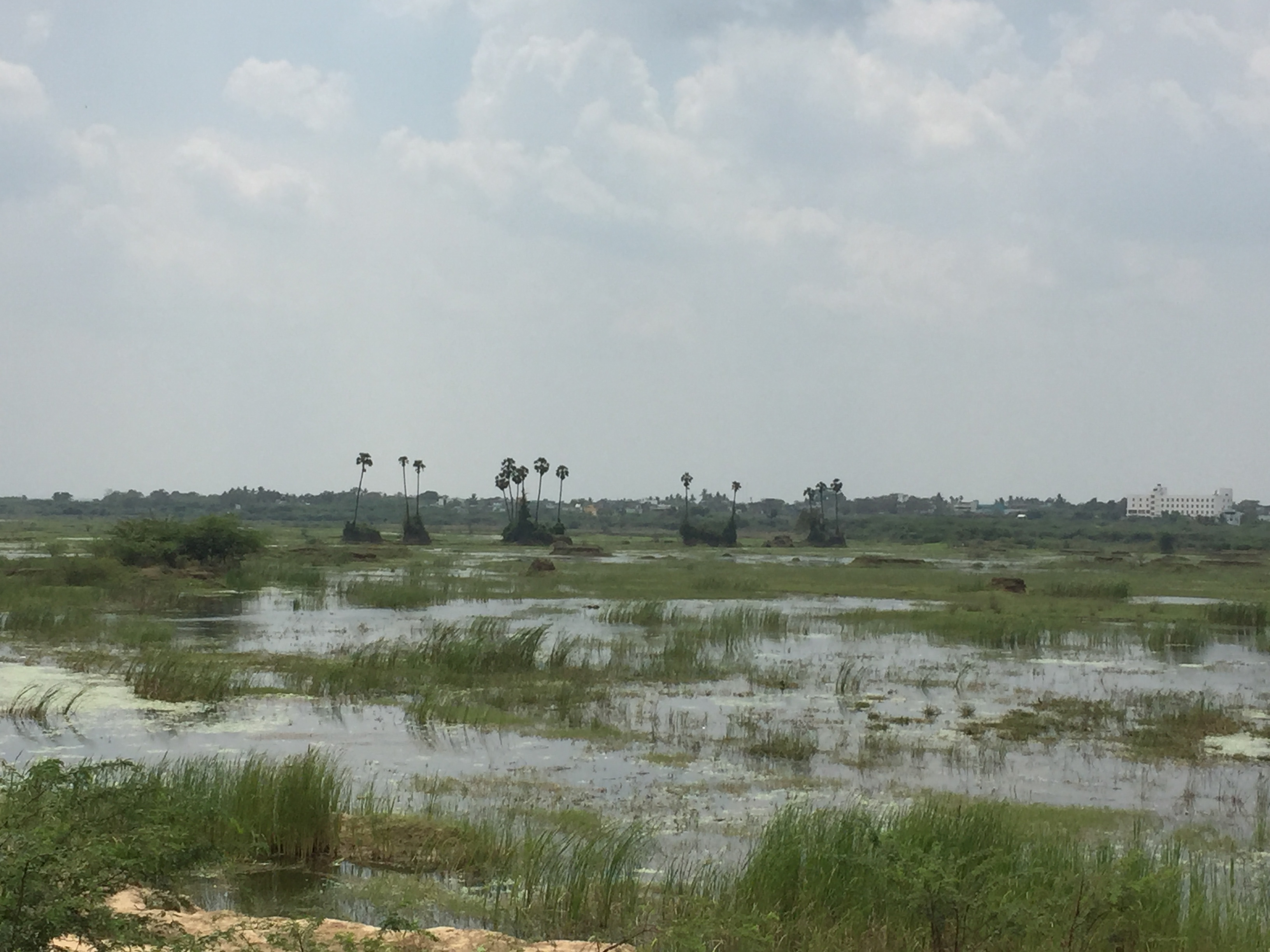
Water Level of Chembarambakkam Lake (15 March 2017)

=== Extreme drought ===
Leading up to this 2019 crisis, there were three years of failed monsoon in 2016, 2017, and 2018. The 2018 monsoon season was one of the driest ever recorded in Chennai, as only 343.7 mm of rain had fallen compared to an average of 757.6 mm, which was a 55% rainfall deficit. Additionally, the entire state of Tamil Nadu had recorded a 23% rainfall deficit in that season. A major heatwave in India from May to June 2019 further increasing the problem by evaporating any water still left in reservoirs. The 2019 crisis specifically followed multiple years of deficient monsoon rainfall in Chennai, with a sharp decline in late-summer rainfall and runoff noted in the years preceding this crisis.

=== Government mismanagement ===
Government mismanagement and unplanned construction has also been a factor to blame for this crisis. Bad city development and poor institutional control led to the pollution of the majority of surface water bodies with mass amounts of untreated sewage and therefore promoted the over-extraction of groundwater. Furthermore, the growing demand for water led to the uncontrolled extraction of groundwater within the city, estimated at 200 million liters per day. This is despite the Chennai Metropolitan Area Groundwater Act from 1987 which prohibited the extraction of groundwater in 302 villages. There has also been a large urban transformation of the water system to become decentralized as general irrigation wells are converted into private wells owned by individuals, and not under municipal authority.

== Impact ==
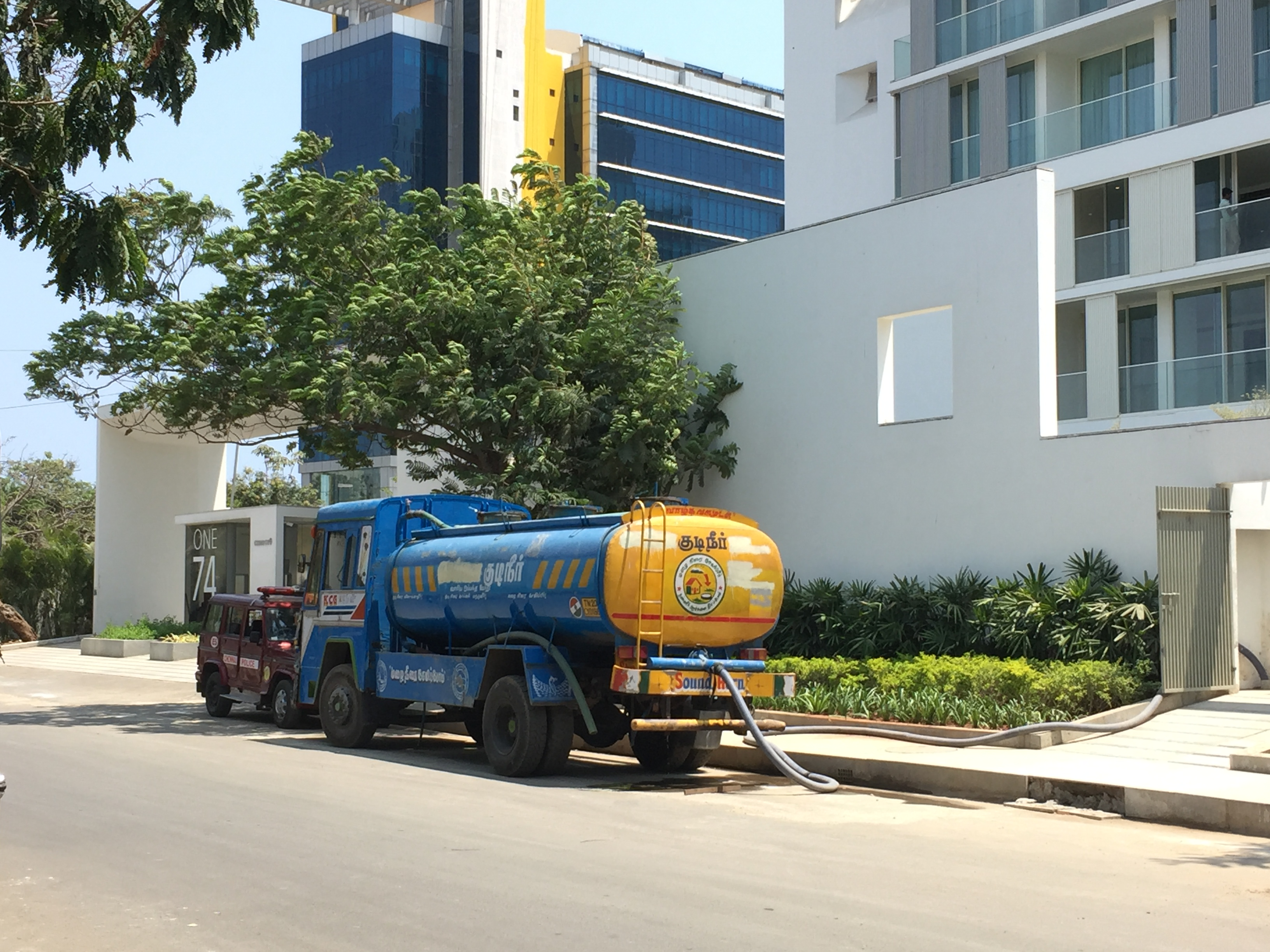
Private Water Tanker in Chennai (15 March 2017)

Millions of people were without consistent access to water. A lack of rainwater and groundwater left four reservoirs that supply water to the city completely dry. The inability to meet the demand for water forced businesses like hotels and restaurants to close. Water tankers from areas of Tamil Nadu unaffected by drought brought water into some areas of the city. However, government tankers took up to a month to appear after requested, so many families, wealthy residents, and business owners opted to pay for costly private water tankers. The poor who lived in slums did not have this option; a family in Chennai's slums received as little as 30 litres (7.9 US gallons) of water every day compared to an average American household which uses 1,150 litres (300 US gallons) of water a day. The tankers were entirely unable to reach some neighborhoods as well, including most of the Chennai slums, where approximately 820,000 people live.

Many fights over water also broke out due to the conflict. In one such conflict that occurred on 15 June 2019, a woman was stabbed and the perpetrator was turned in to the police. On just one day during this crisis, at least 550 people were arrested during protests.

== Solutions ==
In order to prevent a crisis like this from occurring again, a few Chennai-based innovators, including the City of 1,000 Tanks consortium and the Akash Ganga Trust Rain Center, have been working on building new and long term sustainable wastewater and rainwater treatment plans. The City of 1,000 Tanks is working to create a Water Balance Model that runs across the city, and functions by collecting rainwater, treating wastewater and runoff pollution with decentralized Nature-Based Solutions (NBS). Their hope is that this will prevent any future climate-change-induced droughts by increasing the groundwater reserves of the city. This project should mitigate risks associated with any high-frequency floods and any sewage pollution. The City of 1,000 Tanks aims to fix supply-side issues by creating water retention and supply capabilities of 200 to 250 Million Liters per Day.

Additionally, to build resilience to climate change and increase water availability, the Chennai Metropolitan Water Supply and Sewerage Board (CMWSSB) has been working to diversify Chennai's water supply through the use of desalination and sewage treatment. Furthermore, Chennai's government placed a mandate on rainwater harvesting and also became the first city in India to reuse 10% of the collected wastewater, with the hope to achieve a 75% reuse rate.

== See also ==
- Cape Town water crisis – a similar water crisis that occurred in Cape Town, South Africa in 2018
