= Indian water policy =

Government policy, 1987, 2002, 2012

National Water Policy is formulated by the Ministry of Water Resources of the Government of India to govern the planning and development of water resources and their optimum utilization. The first National Water Policy was adopted in September, 1987. It was reviewed and updated in 2002 and later in 2012.

India accounts for 18% of the world population and about 4% of the world’s water resources. One of the solutions to solve the country’s water woes is to create Indian Rivers Inter-link.c

India has been successful in creating live water storage capacity of about 253 billion cubic meter (BCM) so far. In a first, the ecological needs of river have also been taken into consideration.

== Salient features ==
The major provisions under the policy are:

1. Envisages to establish a standardized national information system with a network of data banks and data bases .
2. Resource planning and recycling for providing maximum availability.
3. To give importance to the impact of projects on human settlements and environment.
4. Guidelines for the safety of storage dams and other water-related structures.
5. Regulate exploitation of groundwater .
6. Setting water allocation priorities in the following order: Drinking water, Irrigation, Hydropower, Navigation, Industrial and other uses.
7. The water rates for surface water and ground water should be rationalized with due regard to the interests of small and marginal farmers.

The policy also deals with participation of farmers and voluntary agencies, water quality, water zoning, conservation of water, flood and drought management, erosion etc.

== National Water Policy 2012 ==
The main emphasis of National Water Policy 2012 is to treat water as economic good which the ministry claims to promote its conservation and efficient use. This provision intended for the privatization of water-delivery services is being criticized from various quarters. The policy also does away with the priorities for water allocation mentioned in 1987 and 2002 versions of the policy. The policy was adopted with a disapproval from many states.

== See also ==
- Interstate River Water Disputes Act
- Ground water in India
- Irrigation in India
- Water resources in India
- Water scarcity in India
- Water supply and sanitation in India
- Water pollution in India
