= Interstate River Water Disputes Act, 1956 =

1956 Act of the Parliament of India

The Interstate River Water Disputes Act, 1956 (IRWD Act) is an Act of the Parliament of India enacted under Article 262 of Constitution of India on the eve of reorganization of states on linguistic basis to resolve the water disputes that would arise in the use, and control or distribution of an interstate river or river valley. Article 262 of the Indian Constitution provides a role for the Union government in adjudicating conflicts surrounding interstate rivers that arise among the State governments. This Act (IRWD Act) has been amended subsequently, with the most recent amendment in 2002. This Act has evolved from the laws which were extant during the British Raj.

River waters use / harnessing is included in states jurisdiction (entry 17 of state list, Schedule 7 of Indian Constitution). However, the union government with parliament approval can make laws on regulation and development of interstate rivers and river valleys to the extent such water resources are directly under its ambit when expedient in the public interest (entry 56 of union list, Schedule 7 of Indian Constitution). Damodar Valley Corporation, NHPC, River Boards Act 1956, etc under the control of the union government, are referable to Entry 56 of the union list. Regulation means imposing restrictions or upper ceiling for certain types of water uses to prevent over exploitation of water or protect the ecology and productivity of an interstate river basin. Development means harnessing the water resources. Regulation and development (not administration, control or distribution of water, and ownership) shall be in the interest of public. When union government wants to take over an interstate river project under its control by law (as provided in the constitution) from states per entry 56 of the Union List, it has to take the approval of the riparian states' legislature assemblies before passing such bill in the Parliament per Article 252 of the constitution. The phrase 'by law' means all the applicable Articles of the Constitution shall be fulfilled/adhered. Otherwise, the rights of the Union per entries 53, 54 and 56 of the Union List are similar to a right given to the Union per the concurrent list. When public interest is served, President may also establish an interstate council as per Article 263 to inquire and recommend the dispute that has arisen between the states of India.

IRWD Act (section 2c2) validates the previous agreements (if any) among the basin states to harness the water of an interstate river/ river valley. This act is confined to states of India and not applicable to union territories. Only concerned state governments are entitled to participate in the tribunal adjudication and non-government entities are not permitted.

== Transboundary Rivers Water Sharing Treaties ==
Any river water sharing treaty made with other countries, has to be ratified by the Parliament per Article 253 after deciding the share of the Indian riparian states per Article 262 to make the treaty constitutionally valid or enforceable by the judiciary as India follows dualist theory for the implementation of international treaties/laws. The Indian government has signed Indus Waters Treaty with Pakistan, Ganga water sharing treaty with Bangladesh, etc. without the approval by the Parliament. In April 2025, India suspended unilaterally the Indus Waters Treaty while some disputes resolution proceedings of the Court of Arbitration (CoA) or Neutral Expert were ongoing. Implementation of any award rendered by an international tribunal/CoA against India can be challenged in the Indian Courts on the grounds that the treaty is not valid under the constitution of India since it was not formally ratified by the Parliament per Article 253 of the constitution. In the absence of required approval by the Parliament per Article 253 of the Indian Constitution, which is of fundamental importance, despite discussions on the subject in the Parliament, the ratified treaty is invalid per Article 46 (1) of VCLT.

The Interstate River Water Disputes Act, 1956

Parliament of India
- Long title: An Act to provide for the adjudication of disputes relating to waters of inter-State rivers and river valleys.
- Citation: Act No. 33 of 1956
- Enacted by: Parliament of India
- Assented to: 28 August 1956

Map of the major rivers in India

== Water disputes ==
IRWD Act is applicable only to interstate rivers/river valleys. Water disputes per section 2c of this Act means any dispute including interpretation and implementation of any agreement with respect to use, distribution or control of waters of an interstate river. An action of one state should affect the interests of one or more other states. Then only a water dispute is deemed to have arisen under IRWD Act (section 3). It can be divided into two independent parts for clarity purpose in understanding the techno-legal application of the IRWD Act.

=== Actions of a downstream state affecting the interest of an upstream state ===
A downstream state's action can affect the upstream state's interest only in one case. i.e. when a downstream state is building a dam/barrage near its state boundary and submerging the territory of an upstream state on permanent/temporary basis. Other than this action, no other action of a downstream state could affect the upstream state's interest which they have been using for economic, ecological and spiritual/ religious aspects. The meaning of the word ‘interest’ in this context is concern/importance/significance/relevance / consequence of losing the prevailing water use or purpose.

=== Actions of an upstream state affecting the interest of a downstream state ===
Whereas all the actions of an upstream state to use or control or distribute the water of an interstate river can affect the downstream states in one way or other. The following are some examples but not complete:

1. Consuming river water for any beneficial use such as irrigation, drinking water, industrial, recreation, recharging of groundwater, groundwater use, enhanced evaporation losses, enhancing rainwater use efficiency, obstructing non-flood flows of the river, transferring water to outside the river basin, etc. (i.e. any man-made /aided action of converting water into water vapor & losing to the atmosphere by evapotranspiration / evaporation processes and also transferring river water outside the river basin). This is generally done by constructing water storage reservoirs and subsequently using water for the above purposes.
2. Quality of water can also be diminished/altered/ controlled in the action of using water. It would take place by accumulating the dissolved salts in the remaining water after its use. The dissolved salts content of water increases due to its consumption and also the addition of more salts by anthropogenic activity. Also causing water more silt laden/turbid is a man-made water quality alteration that can be caused by mining and deforestation activities. Bringing water from other river basins for upstream states' use also affects water quality in downstream states.

Generally, river water is transferred to water deficit areas for use after creating the infrastructure for its storage (water reservoirs) and distribution network (canals, pipelines, groundwater charging, etc.). All these acts fall under the river water distribution and control category under IRWD Act. All the above actions of an upstream state are legal causes of water dispute to the downstream states since their existing interests are affected as given below:

- Decrease in water availability:- When an upstream state contemplates water use, it would block the lean season river flows initially by constructing low-cost barrages and tries to store the peak flood waters ultimately by constructing massive water storage reservoirs. In this process, the river flow regime is altered drastically converting it to ephemeral/dry in most of the time except during floods. It also alters the ecology of the river located in downstream states affecting its riverine vegetation and aquatic flora & fauna. Already the delta area of rivers is eroding/shrinking when adequate river water is not reaching the sea. This process of river water harnessing affects the downstream state's interests as they are deprived of constantly available river water which they had been using for their interests. Alternatively, the downstream state needs to store more flood water in reservoirs to cater to the existing water use.
- Deterioration in water quality:- If the water use is 75% of the total available water in the river, the concentration of the dissolved salts in the river water increases by four folds. Alteration in river water quality / alkalinity / salinity effects growth of traditionally cultivated crops as they are not best suitable with the enhanced soil alkalinity and or soil salinity. They either give a lesser yield or consume more saline water for the same yield. Also the aquatic flora & fauna would face survival threat / diminished growth with the enhanced water salinity and or alkalinity. If the river is blocked to reach the Sea (i.e. basin closure) in most of the years, the ecology/fisheries of the surrounding Sea/river mouth area is also affected. Also there is a threat of Sea water ingress into estuaries/delta of the river contaminating groundwater.

The use or control or distribution of river water in an upstream state is invariably denial of prevailing use/purpose in the downstream state as it is altering the natural flow regime of river water with respect to quantity, quality and time of availability in downstream states. Also dam failures in upstream states can create flash floods or further dam failures in downstream states causing unprecedented property damage and loss of human lives. IRWD Act (section 3) clearly stipulates that mere anticipation of a riparian state actions which can affect other riparian state interests is enough to raise interstate water dispute.

The activities of an upstream state without affecting downstream states' interests are peak flood control measures by impounding the flood waters only (not base flows) in 100% or more capacity storage reservoirs for use without affecting water quality appreciably and the run-off hydropower generation taken up in its territory.

== Procedure ==
This Act can be divided into two parts: up to section 5.1 is first part and from the Section 5.2 is later part. The purpose of first part (pre adjudication process) is for identifying, with the involvement of Supreme Court (SC) if needed, the valid water disputes which can be adjudicated by the tribunal. Whenever a water dispute is not in the scope of this Act, such water related disputes between the States is in the jurisdiction of SC per Article 131 of the constitution. Incase a water dispute raised by a State is contested by other riparian States, SC will decide whether such dispute is a valid water dispute falling in the scope of this Act.

Whenever a water dispute is raised by a State with the Union govt in the prescribed format per section 3 of this Act, Union govt shall consult with other riparian states to decide whether such water dispute is relevant to the scope given in sections 2c, proviso of 4(1) and 8 of this Act. After conducting negotiations with all the riparian States to resolve each water dispute amicably, Union govt shall inform all riparian States its decision whether a pending water dispute is falling in the scope of this Act. If the decision conveyed by the Union govt is not acceptable to a State/s, they can approach the SC for adjudication whether it is a valid water dispute referable to a tribunal formed under this Act. SC judgement is final and the dispute is resolved either by the SC or the water tribunal formed per this Act. It is not procedurally correct to form a tribunal by the Union govt without listing specific valid water disputes to it, and water disputes are framed later by the tribunal based on the complaints received from the riparian States. Water tribunal indulging in such procedure is trespassing into the jurisdiction of the apex court. Once the constituted tribunal is provided with the list of valid water disputes (along with details) by the Union govt per section 5.1 of this Act, the actual adjudication process of the valid water disputes referred to it would commence. In case the list of valid water disputes (along with details) are not provided to the tribunal, it shall ask the Union govt to comply with the requirements per section 5.1 of this Act. SC can also peruse the references to be made to the tribunal while nominating the judges per section 4(2) of this Act.

SC has declared that water of a interstate river is national asset and cannot be said to be located in any one State. A tribunal shall distribute an interstate river water on equitable basis among the riparian States subject to reasonable preservation of the ecology and productivity of the river basin as per applicable water policy of the Union govt. The jurisdiction of a new tribunal does not cover the interpretation of an earlier tribunal order/award per section 2c of this Act. Such water disputes involving interpretation of earlier tribunal order/award can only be adjudicated by the SC per Article 131 of the constitution.

== Constitution of a Tribunal ==
Whenever the riparian states are not able to reach amicable agreements on their own in sharing of interstate river waters, section 4 of the IRWD Act provides a dispute resolution process in the form of a Tribunal. As per section 5.2 of the Act, the tribunal shall not only adjudicate but also investigate the matters referred to it by the union government and forward a report setting out the facts with its decisions. It implies that the tribunal's responsibility is not limited to adjudication of issues raised by the concerned states and also the investigation of other aspects which are in the public domain such as water pollution, salt export requirement, water quality deterioration, flood control, sustainability of river basin productivity & its ecology, environmental flow requirements, climate change effects, etc. When the tribunal final verdict issued based on the deliberations on the draft verdict is accepted by the union government and notified in the official gazette, the verdict becomes law and binding on the states and union government for implementation. In case the constitutional rights of states are ingressed upon by the tribunal award in any manner, the union government is obliged to take the consent of parliament and all riparian states under Article 252 of the constitution before publishing the tribunal awards in the official gazette. When pronounced in the ambit of IRWD Act and the Indian constitution, the tribunal's verdict after its publication in the official gazette is equivalent to Supreme Court verdict as per section 6 of IRWD Act.

== Proposed amendments ==
A permanent water dispute tribunal, with its members from sitting/retired judges of Supreme Court or High courts (maximum five including chairman and vice chairman) and technical experts (maximum three), is proposed to resolve the growing number of interstate river water disputes expeditiously. A tribunal bench shall have one technical expert member and one judicial member with the chairman or vice chairman out of the members of the permanent water dispute tribunal.

Section 5 (2a) of the proposed amendment mandated that the tribunal report shall also prescribe for the distribution of water among the states during distress situations arising from a shortage in river water availability.

The Union government is contemplating bringing a new act in place of the River Boards Act, 1956 which is presently purely an advisory body of the union government. The new bill called "River basin Management Bill" would constitute River Basin Organisations for each interstate river basin with a two-tier structure. The lower tier 'Executive Board' of a river basin is represented by various relevant faculties from each riparian state including the union government. The top tier called the 'Governing Council' of a river basin will have all chief ministers of riparian states as its members to arrive at unanimous decisions. In case of no consensus decision, the dispute would be referred to the tribunal formed under Interstate River Water Disputes Act, 1956.

=== Amendment Act of 2002 ===
This amendment (second para of section 4 (1) of the Act) specifically does not permit altering the prevailing tribunal verdicts issued before the year 2002 (i.e. but not the tribunal awards issued after the year 2002). Thus this amendment bars the tribunals to give any time period/validity for constituting a new tribunal. This is to keep provision to resolve new water disputes which were not addressed by earlier tribunals/ agreements as and when they surface.

=== Amendment Bill of 2019 ===
Inter-State River Water Disputes Amendment Bill, 2019 : The Inter-State River Water Disputes Amendment Bill was introduced in Lok Sabha on 25 July 2019 by the minister of Jal Shakti. It proposes to amend the Inter-State River Water Disputes Act, 1956. The bill got lapsed since it was not approved in time before electing the new Lok Sabha in 2024.

- Under the Act, a state government may request the central government to refer an inter-state river dispute to a Tribunal for adjudication. If the central government is of the opinion that the dispute cannot be settled through negotiations, it is required to set up a Water Disputes Tribunal for adjudication of the dispute, within a year of receiving such a complaint. The Bill seeks to replace this mechanism.
- Disputes Resolution Committee: Under the Bill, when a state puts in a request regarding any water dispute, the central government will set up a Disputes Resolution Committee (DRC), to resolve the dispute amicably. The DRC will consist of a Chairperson, and experts with at least 15 years of experience in relevant sectors, to be nominated by the central government. It will also include one member from each state (at the Joint Secretary level), who is party to the dispute, to be nominated by the concerned state government.
- The DRC will seek to resolve the dispute through negotiations, within one year (extendable by six months), and submit its report to the central government. If a dispute cannot be settled by the DRC, the central government will refer it to the Inter-State River Water Disputes Tribunal. Such referral must be made within three months from the receipt of the report from the DRC.
- Tribunal: The central government will set up an Inter-State River Water Disputes Tribunal, for the adjudication of water disputes. This Tribunal can have multiple benches. All existing Tribunals will be dissolved, and the water disputes pending adjudication before such existing Tribunals will be transferred to the new Tribunal.
- Composition of the Tribunal: The Tribunal will consist of a Chairperson, Vice-Chairperson, three judicial members, and three expert members. They will be appointed by the central government on the recommendation of a Selection Committee. Each Tribunal Bench will consist of a Chairperson or Vice-Chairperson, a judicial member, and an expert member. The central government may also appoint two experts serving in the Central Water Engineering Service as assessors to advise the Bench in its proceedings. The assessor should not be from the state which is a party to the dispute.
- Time frames: Under the Act, the Tribunal must give its decision within three years, which may be extended by two years. Under the Bill, the proposed Tribunal must give its decision on the dispute within two years, which may be extended by another year. Under the Act, if the matter is again referred to the Tribunal by a state for further consideration, the Tribunal must submit its report to the central government within a period of one year. This period can be extended by the central government. The Bill amends this to specify that such extension may be up to a maximum of six months.

== River Boards Act, 1956 ==
This is an act passed by the Parliament under entry 56 of Union List to form River Boards to advice or recommend states in developing intrastate water resource projects which does not have interstate implications. Section 8 of Interstate River Water Disputes Act, 1956 stipulates that no reference shall be made to a Tribunal of any dispute that may arise regarding any matter which may be referred to arbitration under the River Boards Act, 1956.

== Dams Safety Act, 2021 ==
Parliament passed the Dams Safety Act, 2021 to monitor the safety of aging dams located on all rivers of India. As it is covering all the rivers in India instead of interstate rivers, a petition was filed in High Court against such law challenging its constitutional validity.The Act was not passed by law after taking the approval of State legislatures before the bill is passed by the Parliament as required under Article 252. The Act makes executive wing of states responsible in implementing the objectives of the Act. This legislation was made by the Parliament per item 56 of the Union List whose implementation per Article 73 and 162 is totally under executive powers of the Union and not by the States unless mutually agreed upon per Article 258.

== Tribunal awards ==
Till now three tribunal awards are notified in official gazette by the Government of India. These are water dispute tribunals allocating river water use by the riparian states for Krishna (tribunal 1), Godavari and Narmada rivers. All these tribunal awards were issued before the year 2002 which cannot be altered by the new tribunals. The tribunals formed on sharing water of Ravi & Beas rivers, Cauvery / Kaveri river, Vamsadhara River, Mahadayi / Mandovi River and Krishna River (tribunal 2 ) are either yet to pronounce the verdicts or the issued verdicts are to be accepted by the Government of India.

Ravi and Beas waters tribunal was set up in 1986 and the tribunal has not given its final report even after 38 years.

Cauvery water disputes tribunal order was notified by the GoI on 20 February 2013 and later Supreme Court changed the tribunal order altering water allocations.

The Vamsadhara tribunal pronounced its final verdict in September 2017 and permitted AP state to construct the side weir at Katragedda and Neradi barrage. The Union government issued the gazette order in 2026 to implement the tribunal award.

In March 2018, Mahanadi Water Disputes Tribunal is formed under the direction of the Supreme Court to adjudicate water sharing dispute between Odisha and Chhattisgarh states.

The Mahadayi Water Tribunal pronounced its final verdict in August 2018 and permitted Karnataka state to use water outside the basin for drinking water use. The tribunal has not vacated the stay order on the execution of works by Karnataka till the verdict is notified by a gazette order by the Union.

== Establishment of authorities to implement a tribunal verdict ==
Under Section 6A of this Act, central government may frame a scheme or schemes to give effect to the decision of a tribunal. Each scheme has a provision to establish an authority for the implementation of a tribunal verdict. However, every scheme and all its regulations shall be approved by the parliament. When a tribunal verdict, after formally gazetted by the union government, stipulates to establish the verdict implementation authority/board, the same shall be complied by the union government as the tribunal verdict is equal to Supreme Court verdict. As per Articles 53 & 142 of the constitution, it is the duty of the President to enforce the tribunal/supreme court order/verdict without time delay till the Parliament, under Section 6A of this Act, decides against or makes modifications to the already established implementation board/authority.

In the case of the Cauvery River basin, SC directed the GoI to set up a temporary Supervisory Committee to implement the tribunal order till the constitution of the Cauvery Management Board by GoI. GoI established the said temporary Supervisory Committee on 22 May 2013. In the case of Babli barrage dispute, SC itself constituted, as the sole legal interpreter of the Godavari Tribunal Award since a new tribunal is not permitted to interpret an earlier tribunal award per section 2c of this Act, the Supervisory Committee to implement the water sharing agreement between Maharashtra and Andhra Pradesh in middle Godavari sub-basin.

After nearly 7 years, the KRMB and Godavari River Management Board are notified by the central govt as autonomous bodies and their project-wise functions are stipulated for implementation. KRMB is applicable under River Boards Act, 1956 and not under IRWD Act. It was not formed by a complaint from a riparian state per IRWD Act or by amending IRWD Act accordingly by a Parliament resolution. A river boards (KRMB) decisions are advisory in role and not mandatory for implementation by the states.

Water dispute per section 2c of this Act does not include interpretation and non-implementation/adherence of a tribunal order duly notified by the Union government since an agreement is entirely different from a tribunal/court order. Such water disputes between states attract Article 131 where it is to be adjudicated by the Supreme Court. Since a tribunal order is equivalent to the Supreme Court order, non-implementation of tribunal order amounts to contempt of apex court punishable under criminal charges. State Governors/President of India are bound to implement a tribunal order in letter and spirit as per Article 142 of the Indian Constitution.

== Data bank and information system ==
Under Section 9A of this Act, the central government shall maintain a data bank and information system at the national level for each river basin. State governments shall provide all the data regarding water resources, land, agriculture and matters related thereto as requested by the central government. The central government is also vested with powers to verify the data supplied by the state governments. However, many state governments, e.g., Maharashtra, Chattishgarh, etc have not been furnishing the land use data in their states (Tables 14 to 16 of Integrated Hydrological Data Book, 2012) and Central Water Commission of MoWR is not pursuing the matter earnestly to get the data which is vital in water resources planning.

== See also ==
- Helsinki Rules
- Krishna Water Disputes Tribunal
- Godavari Water Disputes Tribunal
- Narmada Water Disputes Tribunal
- Kaveri River water dispute
- Water right
- Water law
- Environment of India
- Kalpasar Project
- List of rivers by dissolved load
- Ground water in India
- Indian Rivers Inter-link
- Irrigation in India
- List of drainage basins by area
- List of rivers of India by discharge
- List of rivers by discharge
- List of dams and reservoirs in India
- Pollution of the Ganges
- National Water Policy
- Saemangeum Seawall
- Water scarcity in India
- Water supply and sanitation in India
- Water pollution in India
