= List of Indian states and union territories by access to safe drinking water =

This is a list of Indian states and territories ranked by access to safe drinking water. The list is compiled from the 2011 India Census Report published by Government of India. The rank is based on the percentage of households which have access to safe drinking water.

Among states, Rajasthan ranked the highest with 97.6%, while Andhra Pradesh stood lowest with only 33.5% households having access to safe drinking water. Among union territories, Chandigarh stood highest, while Lakshadweep ranked lowest. The national average stood at 85.5%.

== List ==
All figures are from the 2011 Indian Census.

Rank	State	Percentage of households with access to safe drinking water (2011)
1	Rajasthan	97.6
2	Tamil Nadu	95.1
3	Bihar	94.0
4	Haryana	93.8
5	Himachal Pradesh	93.7
6	Maharashtra	92.5
7	Uttarakhand	92.2
8	West Bengal	92.2
9	Punjab	90.5
10	Gujarat	90.3
11	Karnataka	87.5
12	Chhattisgarh	86.3
13	Goa	85.7
** All India Average		85.5
14	Sikkim	85.3
15	Uttar Pradesh	83.4
16	Arunachal Pradesh	78.6
17	Kerala	78.1
18	Madhya Pradesh	78.0
20	Odisha	75.3
21	Assam	69.9
22	Tripura	67.5
23	Mizoram	60.4
24	Jharkhand	60.1
25	Nagaland	53.8
26	Manipur	45.4
27	Meghalaya	44.7
28	Andhra Pradesh	33.5
U/T	Chandigarh	99.3
U/T	Daman and Diu	98.7
U/T	Puducherry	97.8
U/T	Delhi	95.0
U/T	Dadra and Nagar Haveli	91.6
U/T	Andaman and Nicobar Islands	85.5
U/T	Jammu and Kashmir	76.8
U/T	Lakshadweep	22.8

== Trends ==
No	States & Union territory	1991			2001			2011		
No	States & Union territory	Total	Rural	Urban	Total	Rural	Urban	Total	Rural	Urban
1	Jammu & Kashmir	na	na	na	65.2	54.9	95.7	76.8	70.1	96.1
2	Himachal Pradesh	77.3	75.5	91.9	88.6	87.5	97.0	93.7	93.2	97.8
3	Punjab	92.7	92.1	94.2	97.6	96.9	98.9	97.6	96.7	98.9
4	Chandigarh	97.7	98.1	97.7	99.8	99.9	99.8	99.3	98.7	99.4
5	Uttarakhand	a	a	a	86.7	83.0	97.8	92.2	89.5	98.7
6	Haryana	74.3	67.1	93.2	86.1	81.1	97.3	93.8	92.0	96.7
7	Delhi	95.8	91.0	96.2	97.2	90.1	97.7	95.0	87.9	95.2
8	Rajasthan	59.0	50.6	86.5	68.2	60.4	93.5	78.1	72.8	94.3
9	Uttar Pradesh	62.2	56.6	85.8	87.8	85.5	97.2	95.1	94.3	97.9
10	Bihar	58.8	56.5	73.4	86.6	86.1	91.2	94.0	93.9	94.7
11	Sikkim	73.1	70.8	92.8	70.7	67.0	97.1	85.3	82.7	92.2
12	Arunachal Pradesh	70.0	66.9	88.2	77.5	73.7	90.7	78.6	74.3	91.3
13	Nagaland	53.4	55.6	45.5	46.5	47.5	42.3	53.8	54.6	51.8
14	Manipur	38.7	33.7	52.1	37.0	29.3	59.4	45.4	37.5	60.8
15	Mizoram	16.2	12.9	19.9	36.0	23.8	47.8	60.4	43.4	75.8
16	Tripura	37.2	30.6	71.1	52.5	45.0	85.8	67.5	58.1	91.9
17	Meghalaya	36.2	26.8	75.4	39.0	29.5	73.5	44.7	35.1	79.5
18	Assam	45.9	43.3	64.1	58.8	56.8	70.4	69.9	68.3	78.2
19	West Bengal	82.0	80.3	86.2	88.5	87.0	92.3	92.2	91.4	93.9
20	Jharkhand	a	a	a	42.6	35.5	68.2	60.1	54.3	78.4
21	Odisha	39.1	35.3	62.8	64.2	62.9	72.3	75.3	74.4	79.8
22	Chhattisgarh	a	a	a	70.5	66.2	88.8	86.3	84.1	93.9
23	Madhya Pradesh	53.4	45.6	79.4	68.4	61.5	88.6	78.0	73.1	92.1
24	Gujarat	69.8	60.0	87.2	84.1	76.9	95.4	90.3	84.9	97.0
25	Daman & Diu	71.4	56.9	86.8	96.3	94.9	98.9	98.7	97.8	99.0
26	Dadra & Nagar Haveli	45.6	41.2	91.0	77.0	70.5	96.1	91.6	84.3	98.4
27	Maharashtra	68.5	54.0	90.5	79.8	68.4	95.4	83.4	73.2	95.7
28	Andhra Pradesh	55.1	49.0	73.8	80.1	76.9	90.2	90.5	88.6	94.5
29	Karnataka	71.7	67.3	81.4	84.6	80.5	92.1	87.5	84.4	92.3
30	Goa	43.4	30.5	61.7	70.1	58.3	82.1	85.7	78.4	90.4
31	Lakshadweep	11.9	3.4	18.8	4.6	4.6	4.6	22.8	31.2	20.2
32	Kerala	18.9	12.2	38.7	23.4	16.9	42.8	33.5	28.3	39.4
33	Tamil Nadu	67.4	64.3	74.2	85.6	85.3	85.9	92.5	92.2	92.9
34	Puducherry	88.8	92.9	86.1	95.9	96.6	95.5	97.8	99.6	97.0
35	Andaman & Nicobar Islands	67.9	59.4	90.9	76.7	66.8	97.8	85.5	78.2	98.1
All India		62.3	55.5	81.4	77.9	73.2	90.0	85.5	82.7	91.4
