= Indian states ranking by prevalence of open defecation =

This is a list of Indian states and territories by the percentage of households which are open defecation free, that is those that have access to sanitation facilities, in both urban and rural areas along with data from the Swachh Bharat Mission (under the Ministry of Drinking Water and Sanitation), National Family Health Survey, and the National Sample Survey (under the Ministry of Statistics and Programme Implementation). The reliability of this information can be questioned, as it has been observed that there is still open defecation in some states claimed "ODF".

More Indians living in villages owned a latrine in 2018 than four years ago, yet 44% of them still defecate in the open, according to a survey covering Rajasthan, Bihar, Madhya Pradesh and Uttar Pradesh that was released on January 4, 2019. These four states together contain two-fifths of India's rural population and reported high open defecation rates, over 87% in 2016.

By 2016, three states/UTs namely Sikkim, Himachal Pradesh, Kerala had been declared ODF.

Rajasthan and Madhya Pradesh, two states that had declared themselves open defecation-free, are yet to achieve that goal. In Rajasthan and Madhya Pradesh 63% and 35% respectively were estimated to be defecating in the open.

Household toilet construction increased from 43.79% in 2014, to 65.74% in 2016, to 98.53 in 2018. On 2 October 2019, all 35 states and union territories were declared open defecation free.

== List ==
No.	State/ Union Territory	% Rural households with exclusive access to a toilet (NSS Jul-Dec 2018)	% of households with exclusive improved sanitation facility (NFHS 2019-2020)
1	A & N Islands	89.4	88
2	Andhra Pradesh	66	72.1
3	Arunachal Pradesh	–	–
4	Assam	95	68.4
5	Bihar	23.0	04.0
6	Chandigarh	–	–
7	Chhattisgarh	–	–
8	D & N Haveli	–	–
9	Daman and Diu	–	–
10	Goa	72.3	86.4
11	Gujarat	71.4	63.3
12	Haryana		
13	Himachal Pradesh	88.7	81.3
14	Jammu and Kashmir	76.6	72.3
15	Jharkhand	–	–
16	Karnataka	67.9	68.5
17	Kerala	97.2	98.5
18	Laskhadweep	100	100
19	Madhya Pradesh	–	–
20	Maharashtra	72.7	69.4
21	Manipur	91.4	67.5
22	Meghalaya	95.8	83.3
23	Mizoram	99.9	93.2
24	Nagaland	89.1	90.4
25	Odisha	–	–
26	Puducherry	–	–
27	Punjab	–	–
28	Rajasthan	–	–
29	Sikkim	96.8	89.3
30	Tamil Nadu	–	–
31	Telangana	69.7	72.9
32	Tripura	84.3	71.6
33	Uttar Pradesh	–	–
34	Uttarakhand	98.53	–
35	West Bengal	56	64.7
	India	–	–
