= Jukkal Assembly constituency =

Constituency of the Telangana legislative assembly in India

Coordinates: 18.36°N 77.60°E

Jukkal
- Constituency No. 13 for the Telangana Legislative Assembly
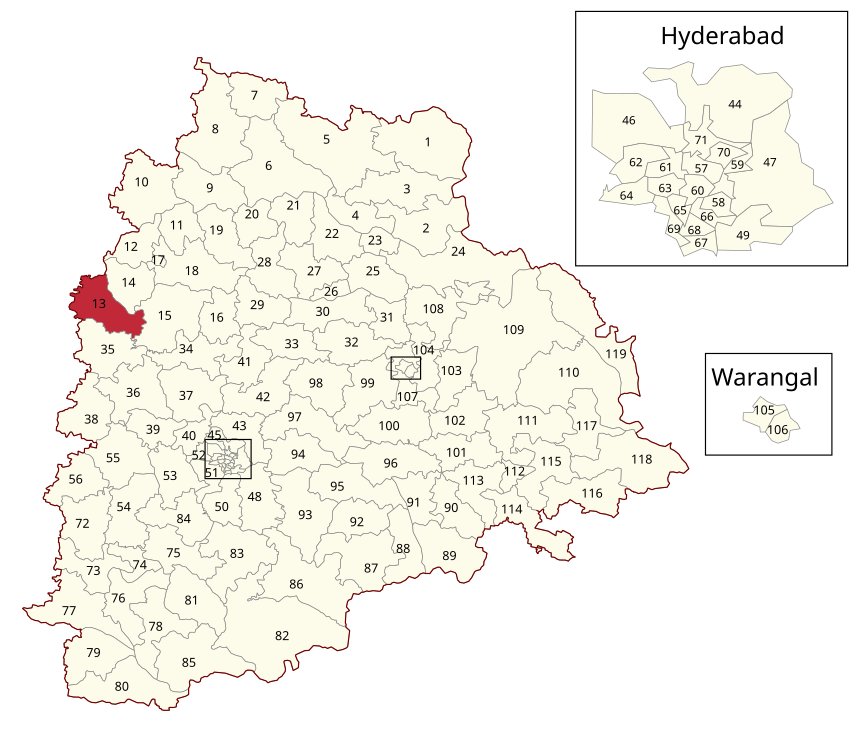
- Location of Jukkal Assembly constituency within Telangana

Constituency details
- Country: India
- Region: South India
- State: Telangana
- District: Kamareddy
- Lok Sabha constituency: Zahirabad
- Established: 1951
- Total electors: 1,56,317
- Reservation: SC

Member of Legislative Assembly
- 3rd Telangana Legislative Assembly
- Incumbent Thota Laxmi Kantha Rao
- Party: Indian National Congress
- Elected year: 2023

Jukkal Assembly constituency is a SC reserved constituency of Telangana Legislative Assembly, India. It is one of four constituencies in Kamareddy district. It is part of Zahirabad Lok Sabha constituency.

Currently the constituency is held by Indian National Congress leader Thota Laxmi Kantha Rao.

== Mandals ==
The Assembly Constituency presently comprises the following Mandals:

Mandal
Jukkal
Madnur
Bichkunda
Pitlam
Nizamsagar
Dongli
Pedda Kodapgal

== Members of Legislative Assembly ==
Duration	Member	Political party
Andhra Pradesh
1957-62	Madhav Rao	Independent politician
1962-67	Nagnath Rao	Indian National Congress
1967-72	V. Reddy	Independent politician
1972-78	Samal Vithal Reddy	Independent politician
1978-83	Soudagar Gangaram	Indian National Congress
1983-85	Soudagar Gangaram	Indian National Congress
1985-89	Begari Pandari	Telugu Desam Party
1989-94	Soudagar Gangaram	Indian National Congress
1994-99	Begari Pandari	Telugu Desam Party
1999-04	T.Aruna Thara	Telugu Desam Party
2004-09	Soudagar Gangaram	Indian National Congress
2009-14	Hanmanth Shinde	Telugu Desam Party
Telangana
2014-18	Hanmanth Shinde	Telangana Rashtra Samithi
2018-23	Hanmanth Shinde	Telangana Rashtra Samithi
2023-	Thota Laxmi Kantha Rao	Indian National Congress

== Election results ==
=== Telangana Legislative Assembly election, 2023 ===
Telangana Assembly Elections, 2023: Jukkal (Assembly constituency)
Party	Candidate	Votes	%	±%
INC	Thota Laxmi Kantha Rao	64,489	39.19	
BRS	Hanmanth Shinde	63,337	38.49	
BJP	T. Aruna Thara	28,437	17.28	
BSP	Ekambekar Pragna Kumar	1,809	1.10	
NOTA	None of the Above	469	0.29	
Majority		1,152	0.70	
Turnout		1,64,539		
INC gain from BRS		Swing		

=== Telangana Legislative Assembly election, 2018 ===
2018 Telangana Legislative Assembly election: Jukkal
Party	Candidate	Votes	%	±%
TRS	Hanmanth Shinde	77,584	51.20	
INC	Soudagar Gangaram	41,959	27.69	
BJP	T. Aruna Thara	18,840	12.43	
Independent	Karrolla Mohan	7,727	5.10	
NOTA	None of the Above	1,976	1.30	
Majority		29,625	23.8	
Turnout		1,51,522	85.56	
TRS hold		Swing		

=== Telangana Legislative Assembly election, 2014 ===
Telangana Assembly Elections, 2014: Jukkal (SC) (Assembly constituency)
Party	Candidate	Votes	%	±%
TRS	Hanmanth Shinde	72,901	52.00	
INC	Gangaram S.	37,394	27.00	
Independent	T. Aruna Tara	10,324	7.39	
TDP	Maddela Naveen Kumar	7,462	5.29	
BSP	Soudagar Gangaram	5,211	3.69	
Majority		35,507	25.00	
Turnout		1,41,189	78.17	
TRS gain from INC		Swing		

== See also ==
- List of constituencies of Telangana Legislative Assembly
