= Kamareddy Assembly constituency =

Constituency of the Telangana legislative assembly in India

Coordinates: 18.33°N 78.33°E

Kamareddy
- Constituency No. 16 for the Telangana Legislative Assembly
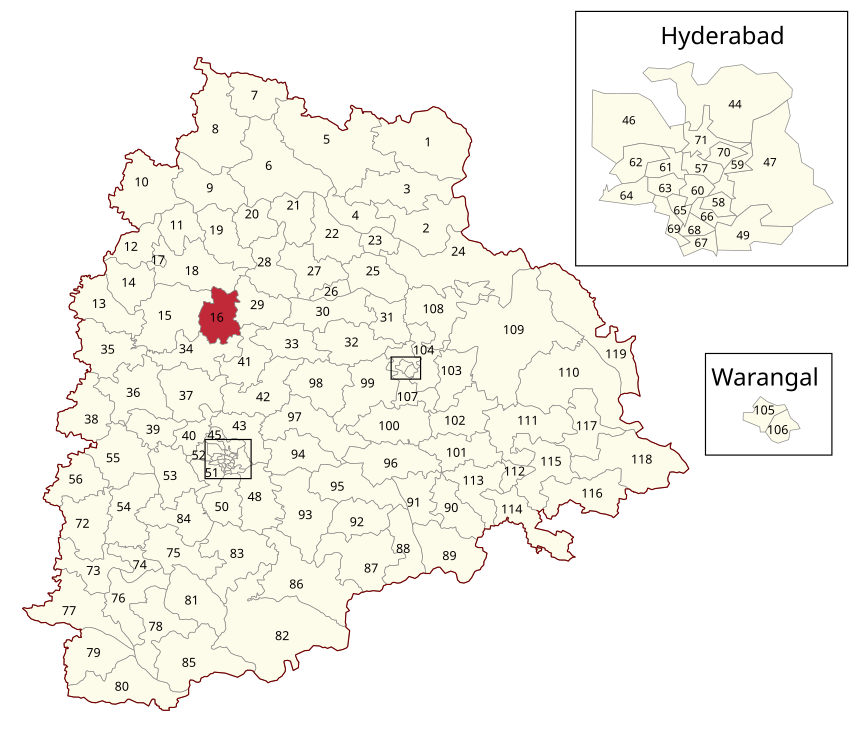
- Location of Kamareddy Assembly constituency within Telangana

Constituency details
- Country: India
- Region: South India
- State: Telangana
- District: Kamareddy
- Lok Sabha constituency: Zahirabad
- Established: 1951
- Total electors: 2,05,723
- Reservation: None

Member of Legislative Assembly
- 3rd Telangana Legislative Assembly
- Incumbent K. V. Ramana Reddy
- Party: Bharatiya Janata Party
- Elected year: 2023

Kamareddy Assembly constituency is a constituency of Telangana Legislative Assembly, India. It is one of four constituencies in Kamareddy district. It is part of the Zahirabad Lok Sabha constituency.

Katipally Venkata Ramana Reddy is Kamareddy's incumbent Member of the Telangana Legislative Assembly who assumed office on 3 December 2023. Preceded by Gampa Govardhan. Kamareddy Constituency member Katipally Venkata Ramana Reddy's personal details: Party- Bharatiya Janata Party (2018 - present) Other political affiliations: Indian National Congress (until 2014), Y. S. R. Congress (2014 - 2018). Katipally Venkata Ramana Reddy of the Bharatiya Janata Party won the election in 2023 defeating K. Chandrashekar Rao, BRS president and former chief minister of Telangana and Revanth Reddy, TPCC president and the current Chief Minister of Telangana.

== Mandals ==
The Assembly Constituency presently comprises the following Mandals:

Mandal
Kamareddy
Machareddy
Domakonda
Bhiknur
Bibipet
Rajampet

== Members of Legislative Assembly ==
Duration	Member	Political party
2023-Present	K. V. Ramana Reddy	Bharatiya Janata Party
2018-23	Gampa Govardhan	Telangana Rashtra Samithi
2014-18	Gampa Govardhan	Telangana Rashtra Samithi
2012-14	Gampa Govardhan	Telangana Rashtra Samithi
2009-12	Gampa Govardhan	Telugu Desam Party
2004-09	Mohammed Ali Shabbir	Indian National Congress
1999-04	Yousuf Ali	Telugu Desam Party
1994-99	Gampa Govardhan	Telugu Desam Party
1989-94	Mohammed Ali Shabbir	Indian National Congress
1985-89	A. Krishna Murthy	Telugu Desam Party
1983-85	Parsi Gangaiah	Telugu Desam Party
1978-83	B. Balaiah	Indian National Congress
1972-78	Y Sathyanarayana	Indian National Congress
1967-72	M.Reddy	Independent politician
1962-67	Vittalreddigari Venkatarama Reddy	Indian National Congress
1957-62	T. N. Sada Lakshmi	Indian National Congress
1952-57	V. Rama Rao	Indian National Congress
1952-57	G. Vithal Reddy	Indian National Congress

== Election results ==
=== Telangana Legislative Assembly election, 2023 ===
This election became high-profile because both the then-Chief Minister of Telangana, K. Chandrashekar Rao, and the current Chief Minister, Revanth Reddy (who was then the TPCC president), were defeated by BJP candidate. Their defeat became a major talking point in the state's political landscape.

2023 Telangana Legislative Assembly election: Kamareddy
Party	Candidate	Votes	%	±%
BJP	K. V. Ramana Reddy	66,652	34.55	+25.03
BRS	Kalvakuntla Chandrashekar Rao	59,911	31.06	−10.96
INC	Anumula Revanth Reddy	54,916	28.47	−10.74
Independent	Ravi Nayak Bhukya	1,823	0.95	
BSP	Udthawar Suresh Goud	1,201	0.62	
NOTA	None of the Above	474	0.25	−0.66
Majority		6,741	3.49	+0.68
Turnout		1,92,889	76.36	
BJP gain from BRS		Swing		

=== Telangana Legislative Assembly election, 2018 ===
2018 Telangana Legislative Assembly election: Kamareddy
Party	Candidate	Votes	%	±%
TRS	Gampa Govardhan	68,167	42.02	
INC	Mohammed Ali Shabbir	63,610	39.21	
BJP	K. V. Ramana Reddy	15,439	9.52	
NOTA	None of the Above	1,471	0.91	
Majority		5,007	2.81	
Turnout		1,62,228	78.83	
TRS hold		Swing		

=== Telangana Legislative Assembly election, 2014 ===
2014 Telangana Legislative Assembly election: Kamareddy
Party	Candidate	Votes	%	±%
TRS	Gampa Govardhan	81,961	41.53	
INC	Mohammed Ali Shabbir	63278	25.04	
BJP	Siddaramulu	13,938	8.82	
BSP	Erra Shivaraju A	3,862	2.44	
Majority		18,683	16.49	
Turnout		1,58,015	80.61	
TRS hold		Swing		

=== 2009 ===
2009 Andhra Pradesh Legislative Assembly election: Kamareddy
Party	Candidate	Votes	%	±%
TDP	Gampa Govardhan	86,986	60.03	
INC	Mohammed Ali Shabbir	39,278	27.10	
PRP	Dhatrika Vittal	8,802	6.07	
BJP	Uppunuthula Muralidhar Goud	3,082	2.13	
LSP	Shivarathri Prathap	2,133	1.47	
IND	Kodipyaka Mahender Goud	2,090	1.44	
PPOI	Boyini Ramulu	1,326	0.92	
BSP	Kyatham Sidha Ramulu	1,217	0.84	
Majority		47,708	32.93	
Turnout		144,914		
TDP gain from INC		Swing		

=== 2004 ===
2004 Andhra Pradesh Legislative Assembly election: Kamareddy
Party	Candidate	Votes	%	±%
INC	Mohammed Ali Shabbir	80,233	60.21	
BJP	V. Muralidhar Goud	27,470	20.61	
TRS	Venu Gopal Goud	18,258	13.70	
IND	D. Srinivas Mudiraj	2,886	2.17	
BSP	A. Shiva Raju	2,835	2.13	
IND	B. Balaiah	1,584	1.19	
Majority		52,763	39.59	
Turnout		133,266		
INC gain from TDP		Swing		

=== 1999 ===
1999 Andhra Pradesh Legislative Assembly election: Kamareddy
Party	Candidate	Votes	%	±%
TDP	Yousuf Ali	63,949	50.34	
INC	Mohammed Ali Shabbeer	60,178	47.37	
ATDP	Patha Bhairaiah	963	0.76	
IND	Ganta Babu	869	0.68	
BSP	Kotapathi Sudhakaru	403	0.32	
AJBP	T. Jithender	396	0.31	
IND	Neelam Venkaiah	280	0.22	
Majority		3,771	2.97	
Turnout		131,994	73.07	
TDP hold		Swing		

== See also ==
- List of constituencies of Telangana Legislative Assembly
