= Thota Laxmi Kantha Rao =

Indian politician

Member of the Telangana Legislative Assembly
- Incumbent
- Assumed office 2023
- Preceded by: Hanmanth Shinde
- Constituency: Jukkal Assembly constituency

Personal details
- Party: Indian National Congress (2023–present)
- Profession: Politician

Thota Laxmi Kantha Rao (born 1970) is an Indian politician from Telangana state. He is an MLA from Jukkal Assembly constituency which is reserved for SC community in Kamareddy district. He represents Indian National Congress Party and won the 2023 Telangana Legislative Assembly election.

== Early life and education ==
Rao was born in Vadnagar and resides at Jukkal, Kamareddy district. His father, Thota Yadagiri Rao, is a farmer. He is a postgraduate and runs his own business and farming.

== Career ==
Rao won from Jukkal Assembly constituency representing Indian National Congress in the 2023 Telangana Legislative Assembly election. He polled 64,489 votes and defeated his nearest rival, a three time MLA, Hanmant Shinde of Bharat Rashtra Samithi by a narrow margin of 1,152 votes.
