= Birkur =

Birkur Virpur
- Mandal/Town
- Location in Telangana, India
- Coordinates: 18.518028°N 77.783203°E
- Country: India
- State: Telangana
- Division: Banswada
- District: Kamareddy

Government
  - Gram Panchayat President: Arige Dharma Teja Sarpanch (2025- Present)
- Elevation: 371 m (1,217 ft)

Population
  - Total: 25,000

Languages
  - Official: Telugu
- Time zone: UTC+5:30 (IST)
- PIN: 503321
- Telephone code: 08466
- Vehicle registration: TS 17
- Lok Sabha constituency: Zahirabad
- Vidhan Sabha constituency: Banswada

Birkur is located in Kamareddy district on the Manjeera riverbed.

== Demographics ==
There is a population of approximately 25,000.

== Economy ==
Birkur's major economy is agrarian (85%) in nature. The rest is small businesses, the public and the private service sector.

== Schools ==
Birkur has a Govt. High School and some private secondary schools.

== Transportation ==
Birkur is well connected by TSRTC with cities and towns like Nizamabad, Bodhan, Banswada, Kotagiri. A Number of auto rickshaws are more than buses

== Crops ==
Birkur is home for many types of crops like Paddy, Sugarcane, sunflower, peanuts (groundnuts), soybean, vegetables and fruits.

== History ==
Prior to the merge with India after independence in 1947, it was ruled by the local king.
