= Mohammed Ali Shabbir =

Indian politician

Member of Legislative Assembly, Andhra Pradesh
- In office 2004–2009
- Preceded by: Yousuf Ali
- Succeeded by: Gampa Govardhan
- Constituency: Kamareddy
- In office 1989–1994
- Preceded by: A. Krishna Murthy
- Succeeded by: Gampa Govardhan

Personal details
- Born: 15 February 1957 (age 69) Machareddy, Nizamabad district, Telangana
- Party: Indian National Congress
- Spouse: Nafees Parveen

Mohammed Ali Shabbir (born 15 February 1957) is an Indian politician who served as the Leader of Opposition in the Telangana Legislative Council from 4 April 2015 to 22 December 2018.

Shabbir Ali comes from an agricultural family in Kamareddy. He began his political career with the National Students' Union of India (NSUI) in the late 1970s. His father, the late Mohammed Masoom, was a senior Congress leader who donated his house to establish a regional Congress office; the present Kamareddy DCC office is located in the same premises.

After graduating with a degree in Commerce, Shabbir Ali joined the Youth Congress and actively participated in party activities. In 1989, he, along with other Youth Congress members, was jailed for 29 days for storming the Legislative Assembly to protest against remarks made by a TDP minister against Rajiv Gandhi. That same year, he contested the Kamareddy Assembly seat on a Congress ticket and won with a large majority. At the age of 32, he was inducted as a minister in the cabinet of Dr. Marri Chenna Reddy, handling portfolios such as Wakf, Sugar, Fisheries, Khadi and Village Handicrafts.

In 1993, Shabbir Ali became India’s first Minorities Welfare Minister, after playing a key role in the creation of the country's first Minorities Welfare Department. For the first time, ₹2 crore was allocated in the 1993–94 budget under 'Welfare of Minorities'. This model was later adopted by other states and, in 2006, a dedicated Minority Affairs Ministry was established at the national level. In 1994, he initiated the proposal for reservations for the Muslim community and persuaded then Chief Minister Kotla Vijayabhaskar Reddy to issue a government order (G.O. MS No. 30, dated 25 August 1994) providing reservations for Muslims and 14 other backward classes. However, the initiative could not progress further after the Congress lost the 1994 and 1999 elections.

At Shabbir Ali's request through APCC in-charge Ghulam Nabi Azad, Congress President Sonia Gandhi included a promise of 5% reservation for Muslims in the party's 2004 election manifesto. Shabbir Ali won the 2004 elections from Kamareddy with a margin of over 52,000 votes and was inducted into Dr. Y. S. Rajasekhara Reddy's cabinet. The reservation policy was implemented within 58 days of assuming office, but the percentage was reduced to 4% following a High Court order, in line with the Supreme Court's 50% ceiling on reservations. The policy continues in both Telangana and Andhra Pradesh and has benefited nearly two million poor Muslims.

During his tenure from 2004 to 2009, Shabbir Ali held portfolios including Information & Public Relations, Energy, Coal, Minorities Welfare, Wakf, Urdu Academy, and NRI Affairs. He also served as the District In-charge Minister for Greater Hyderabad during the implementation of major infrastructure projects such as the international airport, the 162 km Outer Ring Road, and the 11 km expressway. He also oversaw development activities as In-charge Minister for Kadapa district for two years.

On 1 July 1997, Shabbir Ali survived an assassination attempt when Naxalites planted claymore bombs to prevent him, then MP M. Baga Reddy, and others from unveiling statues of Indira Gandhi and Rajiv Gandhi in Machareddy mandal. Five Congress workers were killed, and nine others were seriously injured in the attack.

Within the party, Shabbir Ali has served as State General Secretary and Vice-President of the AP Youth Congress, and as DCC President of Nizamabad for five years. He was later appointed General Secretary and Vice-President of the Andhra Pradesh Congress Committee, and in 2008, he became an executive member of the APCC and a member of the Pradesh Election Manifesto Committee.

Shabbir Ali was elected as a Member of the Andhra Pradesh Legislative Council on 14 March 2013 for a term lasting until March 2019. He served as Leader of Opposition in the Council from 4 April 2015 to 22 December 2018.

He was nominated as a star campaigner for elections in Goa (January 2017), Karnataka (2018), and Bihar (November 2020), and he actively participated in the Maharashtra Assembly elections.

On 3 June 2022, Telangana Congress leaders offered a "chadar" at the Dargah Hazrat Yousufain in Nampally to pray for Sonia Gandhi’s speedy recovery from COVID-19. Participants included Shaik Abdullah Sohail (Minorities Department chairman), Nuthi Srikanth (OBC cell chairman), Sameer Waliullah (former Hyderabad Congress Minorities Department chairman), Syed Nizamuddin (TPCC spokesperson), Feroz Khan, Osman Mohammed Khan, Mateen Shareef, and other senior leaders.

Shabbir Ali was nominated by the Congress to contest from the Nizamabad constituency for the 2023 Telangana Legislative Assembly elections. He was also appointed as SC, ST, OBC and Minority Affairs Advisor to the Telangana Government, with the rank and status of Minister of State.

== Electoral history ==
Year	Constituency	Party	Votes	Opponent		Result	Margin
1989	Kamareddy	INC	48,250	TDP	G. Venkata Ramana Reddy	Won	14,120
1994	Kamareddy	INC	35,410	TDP	Y. Lakshmikanth Reddy	Lost	-6,340
1999	Kamareddy	INC	52,140	TDP	Y. Lakshmikanth Reddy	Lost	-4,120
2004	Kamareddy	INC	78,450	TDP	Y. Lakshmikanth Reddy	Won	52,140
2009	Kamareddy	INC	45,120	TDP	Gampa Govardhan	Lost	-3,250
2010 (By-el.)	Yellareddy	INC	42,150	TRS	Eanugu Ravinder Reddy	Lost	-6,420
2014	Kamareddy	INC	59,200	TRS	Gampa Govardhan	Lost	-4,700
2018	Kamareddy	INC	67,100	TRS	Gampa Govardhan	Lost	-4,475
2023	Nizamabad Urban	INC	45,310	BJP	Dhanpal Suryanarayana Gupta	Lost	-15,280
