= Talamadla =

- Village
- Nickname: Talamadla
- Location in Telangana, India Talamadla (India)
- Coordinates: 18.2264056°N 78.354355°E
- Country: India
- State: Telangana
- District: Kamareddy
- Metro: Kamareddy district

Government
  - Body: Mandal Office

Languages
  - Official: Telugu
- Time zone: UTC+5:30 (IST)
- PIN: 503102
- Area code: 08468
- Vidhan Sabha constituency: Kamareddy
- Planning agency: Panchayat
- Civic agency: Mandal Office

Talamadla is a village located in the taluk of Kamareddy, mandal of Rajampet, district of Kamareddy, in the State of Telangana, India.
