= Karadpally =

Village in Telangana, India

- Village
- Location within Telangana Location within India
- Coordinates: 18°21′45″N 78°10′58″E
- Country: India
- State: Telangana
- District: Kamareddy
- Mandal: Tadwai
- Time zone: UTC+05:30 (Indian Standard Time)

Karadpally is a village and gram panchayat in Kamareddy district, Telangana, India. The main city for this village is Hyderabad, about 140 kilometres (87 mi) away.
