= Godavari Water Disputes Tribunal =

Tribunal created by the government of India

Godavari Water Disputes Tribunal is a common tribunal to solve river water disputes, created by the Government of India on 10 April 1969.

== Detailed information ==
The Government of India (GoI) constituted a common tribunal on 10 April 1969 to solve the river water utilization disputes about the river basin states of Godavari and Krishna rivers under the provisions of Interstate River Water Disputes Act – 1956. The common tribunal was headed by Sri RS Bachawat as its chairman with Sri DM Bhandari and Sri DM Sen as its members.

Godavari River basin spreads through the states of Telangana (TS), Maharashtra (MR), Odisha, old Madhya Pradesh {later bifurcated into present Madhya Pradesh (MP) and Chhattisgarh}, Karnataka (K) and Andhra Pradesh (AP). Krishna River basin states Maharashtra, Karnataka and Andhra Pradesh insisted on the quicker verdict as it had become more expedient for the construction of irrigation projects in Krishna basin. So the Godavari Water Disputes Tribunal (GWDT) could not proceed until the Krishna Water Disputes Tribunal final verdict was submitted, the verdict was submitted to the Government on 27 May 1976.

Before the reorganization of the states in 1956, the Planning Commission conducted a meeting on 27 July 1951 involving the then Godavari river basin states: Bombay State, Hyderabad State, Madras State, and Madhya Pradesh state, excluding Odisha state. The purpose of the meeting was to discuss and finalize the utilization of Godavari river water among the riparian states. A memorandum of agreement (found on page 105 of the draft GWDT report) was prepared and later ratified by the participating states. According to the agreement, water allocations were to be reviewed after 25 years, specifically on 27 July 1976.

As the old agreement was nearing expiration, all five states of the Godavari river basin, including Odisha, signed a new agreement on 19 December 1975. This new agreement pertained to the sanction and clearance of projects in accordance with certain bilateral agreements that were made between them after the formation of the GWDT.

This agreement, together with its annexures, was filed before the GWDT on 12 July 1976. The voluntary cooperation shown by the disputing states through this gesture made the process easier for the Tribunal. However, the states of Odisha and Chhattisgarh were unable to reach an agreement with Andhra Pradesh on various aspects related to the Polavaram dam, such as Full Reservoir Level (FRL)/Maximum Water Level (MWL), spillway design capacity, and flood gates operation schedule during the flood season. The GWDT adjudicated on this issue, and its decision can be found in clause VI of its final order (page 25 of the final GWDT report).

The remaining sections of the final order address the definition of 'water uses' (clauses I & II), 'water use measurement' (clause III A & B), 'water use and losses accounting in a water year from the storage in a reservoir' (clause III C), 'export of Godavari waters to other river basins' (clause IV), 'agreements related to the Godavari river' (clause V), 'Godavari waters' (clause VIII b), and other relevant aspects to interpret and implement the various agreements between the states.

The final report of the GWDT was submitted to the Government of India on 7 July 1980 for approval and notification. The Government of India accepted the verdict of the GWDT and made it legally binding on the river basin states in 1980. The agreements reached between the riparian states at the sub-basin level are reviewed and approved by all riparian states within the entire Godavari basin. Once the tribunal award is accepted, no state can withdraw from the total tribunal award.

The tribunal award applies in full to all riparian states, and no state can obstruct the construction of an agreed-upon or identified interstate project on any grounds by refusing to cooperate.

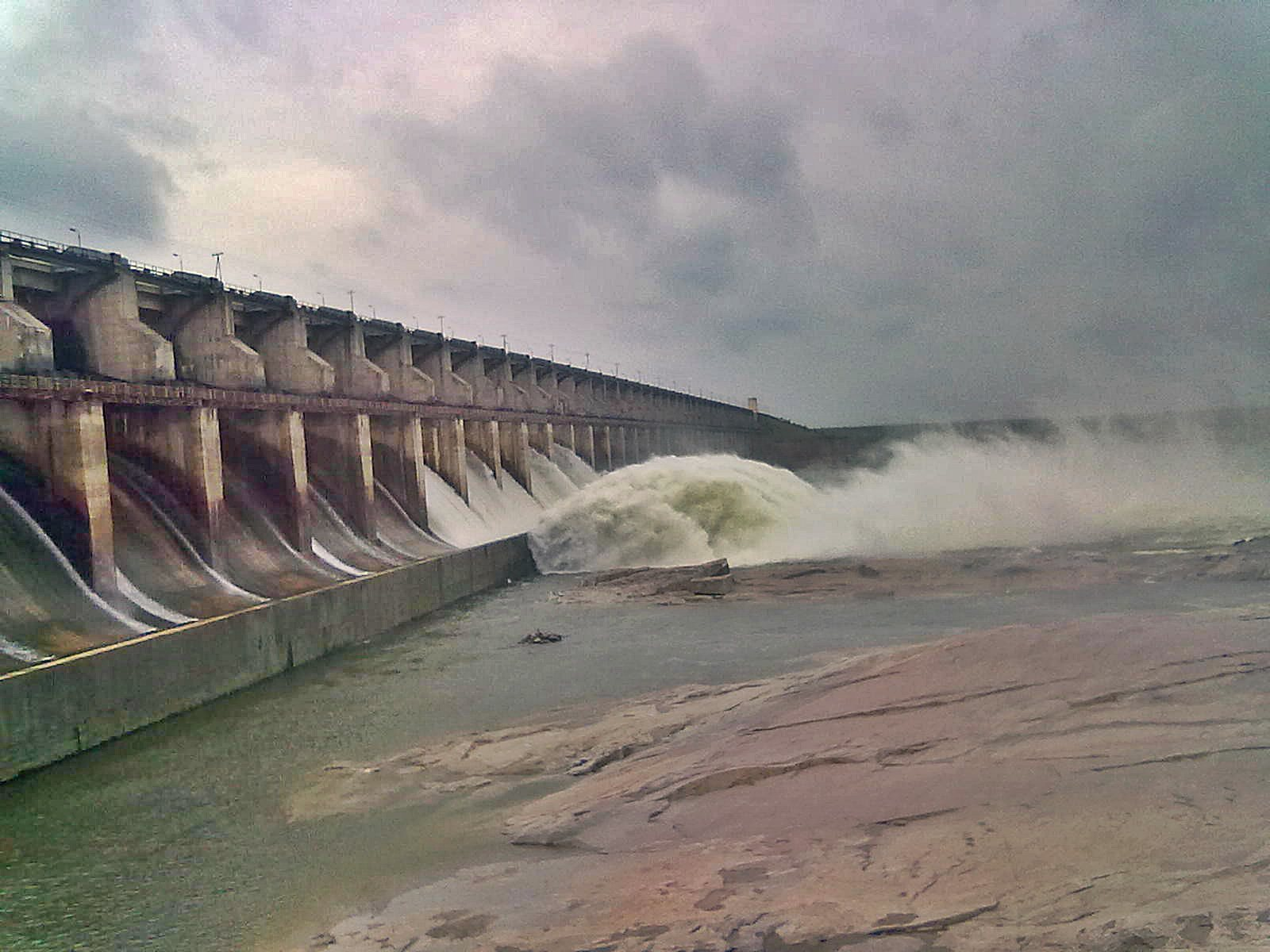
Sriram Sagar Project, an idling project for lack of water inflows in most of the years

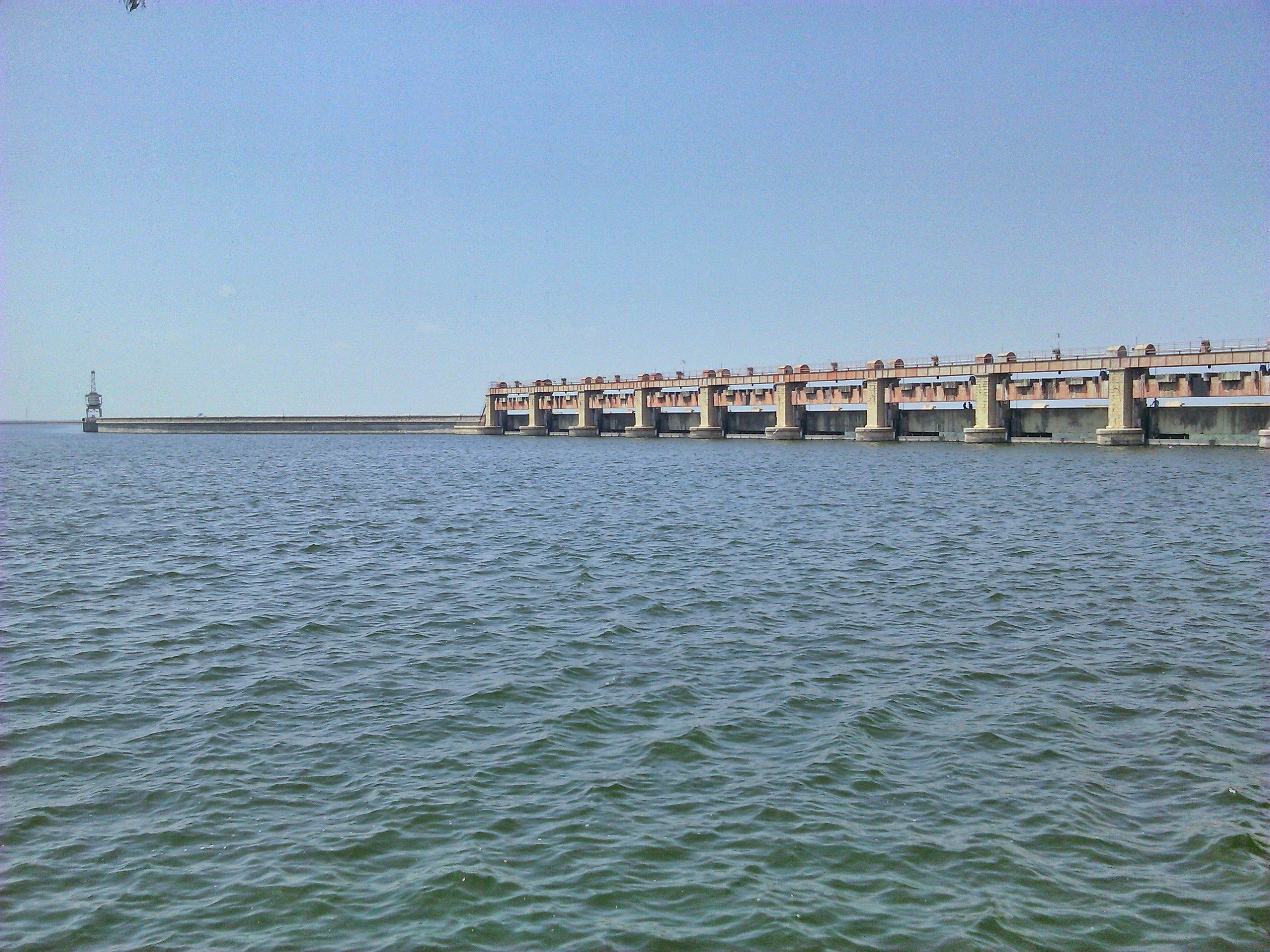
Nizam Sagar, another idling project for lack of water inflows in most of the years

== Water allocations ==
The water used under the existing / completed major, medium & minor irrigation projects up to 6 October 1975 is protected in all the states. The water use sanctioned / cleared up to 6 October 1975 for the major, medium & minor irrigation projects is also protected in all the states. The river basin is mainly bifurcated into the following broad areas to share the river water:

- The catchment area located upstream of Pochampadu dam site.
- Rest of the river downstream of Pochampadu dam site including major tributaries Pranhita, Indravati, and Sabari.

=== Upstream of Pochampadu dam site ===
This river basin area is further subdivided into the following areas:

- Catchment area upstream the Paithan dam site on Godavari: All the water available up to Paithan dam site is allotted to MR for its use.
- Catchment area upstream Siddheshwar Dam site on Purna tributary: All the water available up to Siddheswar dam site is allotted to MR for its use.
- Catchment area upstream Nizamsagar dam site on Manjira tributary: Karnataka can use 13.10 thousand million cubic feet (tmc) under Karanja Project and 1.17tmc under Chukinala Project (Page 86 of original GWDT)

MR can use 22 tmc up to Nizamsagar dam site on Manjira River (Page 90 of original GWDT)

AP can draw 4 tmc for drinking water of Hyderabad city. 58 TMC is agreed and protected water use under the existing Nizamsagar project. (Page 90 of original GWDT)

One tmc water lifting from the Manjira river is allowed by Karnataka. (Page 133 of original GWDT)

- Catchment area upstream of Pochampadu dam site but below Nizamsagar, Siddheswar and Paithan dam sites: MR should not use more than 60 tmc in a water year from the waters of this area. As submitted to the Supreme Court (section 19), MR was using / developing projects for 42 tmc water utilisation in this catchment area before 6 October 1975 agreement with AP, The total permitted water usage from the water generated in this catchment area by MR is 102 tmc. K should not use more than 2.5 tmc in a water year (Page 133 of original GWDT) and AP is at liberty to use remaining waters available at Pochampadu dam site.
- Supreme court verdict (section 83 ii b) on Babli Project dispute stipulated that the gates of Babhali barrage remain lifted during the monsoon season, i.e., 1 July to 28 October and there is no obstruction to the natural flow of Godavari river during monsoon season below the three dams (Paithan, Siddheshwar & Nizamsagar dams) mentioned in clause II (i) of the agreement dated 6 October 1975 towards Pochampad dam. Thus Pochampadu reservoir is accorded priority over any other reservoir (major, medium, minor, barrage, etc.) to receive the water generated from the Godavari basin area located below these three dams. As stipulated by Supreme court, central government has set up a monitoring committee to implement / supervise the water sharing as per the agreement dated 6 October 1975 and the supreme court verdict.

=== Downstream of Pochampadu dam site ===
MR, AP and old MP states can use 300 tmc each and Odisha can use 200 tmc for new projects / uses.

This river catchment area is further subdivided into the following areas (not complete list):

- Catchment area upstream Lower Penganga dam on Penganga tributary: All the water available up to Lower Penganga dam is allotted to MR subject to the condition that this project would be taken up as joint project of MR and AP.
- Warda sub basin: MP should not use more than 9 tmc for its existing, ongoing and proposed projects upstream of upper Warda project of MR. MP can also use additionally 1 tmc for its existing, ongoing and proposed projects located in the remaining sub basin.
- Indravati tributary: Odisha state can use all the water of Indravati tributary in its territory except 45 tmc subject to the condition that minimum 85 tmc is exported outside the Godavari basin from the Upper Indravati project. During the water years, when the water export is below 85 tmc, the water made available to Chhattisgarh state is proportionately reduced. Chhattisgarh state should not use more than 273 tmc upstream of Bhopalapatnam hydro electric project in Indravati sub basin.
- Sabari tributary: Odisha state can use all the water of Sabari (Kolab) tributary up to the point where Sabari river forms common boundary between Odisha and Chhattisgarh states. Additionally, Odisha can use not exceeding 40 tmc from the projects in its territory for its existing, ongoing and new projects. Further Odisha can use not exceeding 27 tmc by withdrawals from the Sabari main river up to Sileru river confluence point for its existing, ongoing and new projects.

Chhattisgarh state can use all the water of Sabari (Kolab) tributary up to the point where Sabari river forms common boundary between Odisha and Chhattisgarh states. Additionally, Chhattisgarh can use all the available water upstream of the listed projects (annexure F of GWDT report) in its territory for its existing, ongoing and new projects. Further, Chhattisgarh can use not exceeding 18 tmc by withdrawals from the Sabari main river up to Sileru river confluence point for its existing, ongoing and new projects.

- Sileru sub basin: The states of Odisha and AP shall continue to use as per the earlier agreement dated 4 September 1962 and 1946 Agreement between Madras and Odisha states.

== Interstate projects ==
These agreements also permit to construct various interstate projects such as Pochampadu project between MR and AP, Lower Penganga project between MR and AP, Pranhita barrages between MR and AP, Lendi project between MR and AP, Bhopalpatnam Hydro electric project between MR and Chhattisgarh, Inchampalli project between MR, Chhattisgarh and AP, Lower Sileru irrigation scheme between AP and Odisha, Polavaram Project between Odisha, Chhattisgarh and AP, future projects across Sabari river between Odisha and Chhattisgarh, Singoor project between Karnataka and AP, Storage projects located in MP for water use in MR, etc.

== Scientific approach ==
When rain falls on the land mass, soil absorbs a part of rain water and remaining part of the rain water joins the nearby stream by flowing on the surface of soil. Some of the water absorbed by the soil gets evaporated from the soil, some part of the remaining water in the soil emerges into the surface stream as seepage flows and rest of water collects in the underground aquifer as ground water. This process also takes place when the land is irrigated by surface water. The surface run off and the subsurface seepage out of the total rainfall is the available water in the river basin after deducting the natural evaporation loss from the naturally formed water bodies (both perennial and non perennial) in the river basin in a water year. The water thus available is called primary water supplies / flows in a river.

If there is no ground water extraction, over a period of time all ground water aquifers get saturated fully and further ground water percolation to the aquifers would join the river streams as enhanced seepage flows / base flows. Thus any underground water extraction / use from the river basin aquifers reduce the primary water flows in the river basin.

When river water is used in surface irrigation, the part of water joining the stream is termed as 'return flows' and the part of water joining the aquifer is termed as 'seepage loss' or manmade ground water charging. The total water available for use is the sum of primary water supplies and return (recycled) flows in a river basin. The total available water for use in a river basin is almost one-and-half times the primary water supplies if net ground water use is also accounted. If ground water use is intensive or close to ground water mining, the return flows would be during heavy rains period only which are below 10% of primary water supplies in the river basin. There would be negligible base flows into the river streams during the remaining period and good chance of river turning in to losing stream due to unsustainable ground water exploitation.

Both evaporation loss and seepage loss take place in manmade water works such as canals, reservoirs, ponds, tanks, percolation ponds / meadows, sewage treatment plants, water harvesting / ground water recharging works / contour bunding of fields, etc. Land is often used for enhanced ground water charging from rain water by constructing contour bunds to the fields for better soil moisture and salt's leaching from the top soil. All these works are either manmade reservoirs or manmade other works as explained in Clause III B & C of final order of GWDT.

Water reservoir creates space to store water for various requirements such as domestic, municipal, irrigation, industrial, power production, navigation, carryover storage for future year's use, pisciculture (fish rearing), wild life protection and recreation purposes. Clause II declares each of above purpose is water use along with the evaporation loss from the associated storage. The sum of all storages (without repetition) associated with all water uses is the total storage of all manmade reservoirs and other works. The loss of water by seepage is due to natural cause/ phenomenon from the manmade reservoirs and other manmade works.

Clause III A defines how the water use is quantified / measured for domestic, municipal, irrigation, industrial, production of power and diversions outside the Godavari river basin area. Clause III B defines how a water use from the manmade reservoirs and other works are measured for remaining uses (navigation, pisciculture, wild life protection and recreation purposes) which are not covered under Clause III A.

Every manmade reservoir's water is invariably used for pisciculture, wild life survival, navigation, recreation, etc. additionally though main water use is for irrigation or domestic or industrial requirements. So the actual seepage loss from the manmade reservoirs and other works are to be accounted under water uses for pisciculture, wild life protection, navigation, recreational purposes as per Clause III B.

Clause I declares that ground water use shall not be reckoned as river water use. In Godavari basin the ground water use exceeds surface / river water use in irrigation, etc. So the actual return flows available would not exceed 10% of primary water supply of the river. Thus as an exception in case of irrigation use, Clause II B aptly says that the extent of return flows shall not be deducted from the water lifted / diverted for the irrigation use (clause III A i). Also, it implies that return flows deduction is applicable for water uses under domestic & municipal water supply (clause III A iii) and industrial purpose (clause III A iv) at the rate of 80% and 97.5% respectively.

Clause III C very clearly says seepage and evaporation water losses to the extent of actual depletion from a manmade reservoir shall be accounted under water use in each water year whether stored water is put to use or not. The water diverted from a reservoir in a water year shall be considered water use only in that year. Mere creation of water storage in a reservoir in a water year is not reckoned as water use in that water year. Thus GWDT allows the creation of carry over storage in reservoirs for future years use when surplus river water is available in a water year to meet water shortfall in the river in future water deficit years up to the permitted water uses. This clause implies that the water use permits are from average annual water availability in the river.

Clause VIII b defines 'Godavari waters' as water of the main stream of the Godavari river, all its tributaries and all other streams contributing water directly or indirectly to the Godavari river. Clause III C implies that any temporary or permanent manmade bund constructed across any stream / point in Godavari river basin / system to obstruct and impound the natural flow of Godavari waters shall be considered as manmade reservoir whatever may be its storage capacity. It also very clearly says seepage and evaporation water losses to the extent of actual depletion from a manmade reservoir in a water year shall be accounted under water use in that water year.

=== Available water for use ===
From the above elaboration of clauses I to IV of GWDT final order, the total available water in a water year from the Godavari river is sum of

- Primary water supplies / flows in a water year,
- Carryover storages available in manmade reservoirs and other works at the beginning of the water year,
- Return flows from the domestic and municipal water supply within the basin at the rate of 80% in that water year and
- Return flows from the Industrial supply within the basin at the rate of 97.5% in that water year.

=== Total water use ===
From the above elaboration of clauses I to IV of GWDT final order, the total water use in a water year from the Godavari river shall be measured as sum of the following

- 100% of Irrigation water supplies made available to minor, supplementary irrigation (water pumped from nearby streams during rainy season for watering dry land crops), medium irrigation and major irrigation,
- 20% of domestic and municipal water supply made available in Godavari river basin
- 2.5% of water supplies made available for Industrial use within the Godavari river basin.
- 100% of water supplies made available for diversion outside the Godavari river basin.
- The extent of depletion of water as evaporation loss from the water storages in all man made reservoirs and other works which shall include canals, reservoirs, ponds, tanks, percolation ponds / meadows, sewage treatment plants, water harvesting / ground water recharging works / rainfed cultivated fields with contour bunds, etc.
- The extent of depletion of water as seepage loss from the water storage in all man made reservoirs and other works which shall include canals, reservoirs, ponds, tanks, percolation ponds / meadows, sewage treatment plants, water harvesting / ground water recharging works / rain fed cultivated fields with contour bunds, etc.

There is surplus water available in the river in 75% of water years after meeting the total water use allocations by GWDT, present and future ground water use, for the moderate environmental flow requirements and salt export or alkalinity control in Godavari river.

The manner water drawl and losses are considered under water uses and measured in a scientific way as incorporated in the GWDT final order by the jury chaired by Sri RS Bachawat and its technical advisers is highly commendable when the present understanding in India of a river basin's development phases and its implications are esoteric even after three decades from the notification of GWDT verdict.

== Ongoing controversies ==
To resolve the disputes between Telangana and AP states, the Godavari River Management Board (GRMB) is notified on 15 July 2021 by the central govt as an autonomous body, and its project wise functions are identified.

Kaleswaram/Pranahita Chevella lift irrigation scheme

Nizamsagar project and Singoor reservoir.

Polavaram Project

Balimela project and Jalaput project

== See also ==
- Indian Rivers Inter-link
- Inchampalli project
- Godavari River Basin Irrigation Projects
- Kaveri River water dispute
- Basalt rock weathering
