= K. V. Ramana Reddy =

Indian politician

Katipally Venkata Ramana Reddy
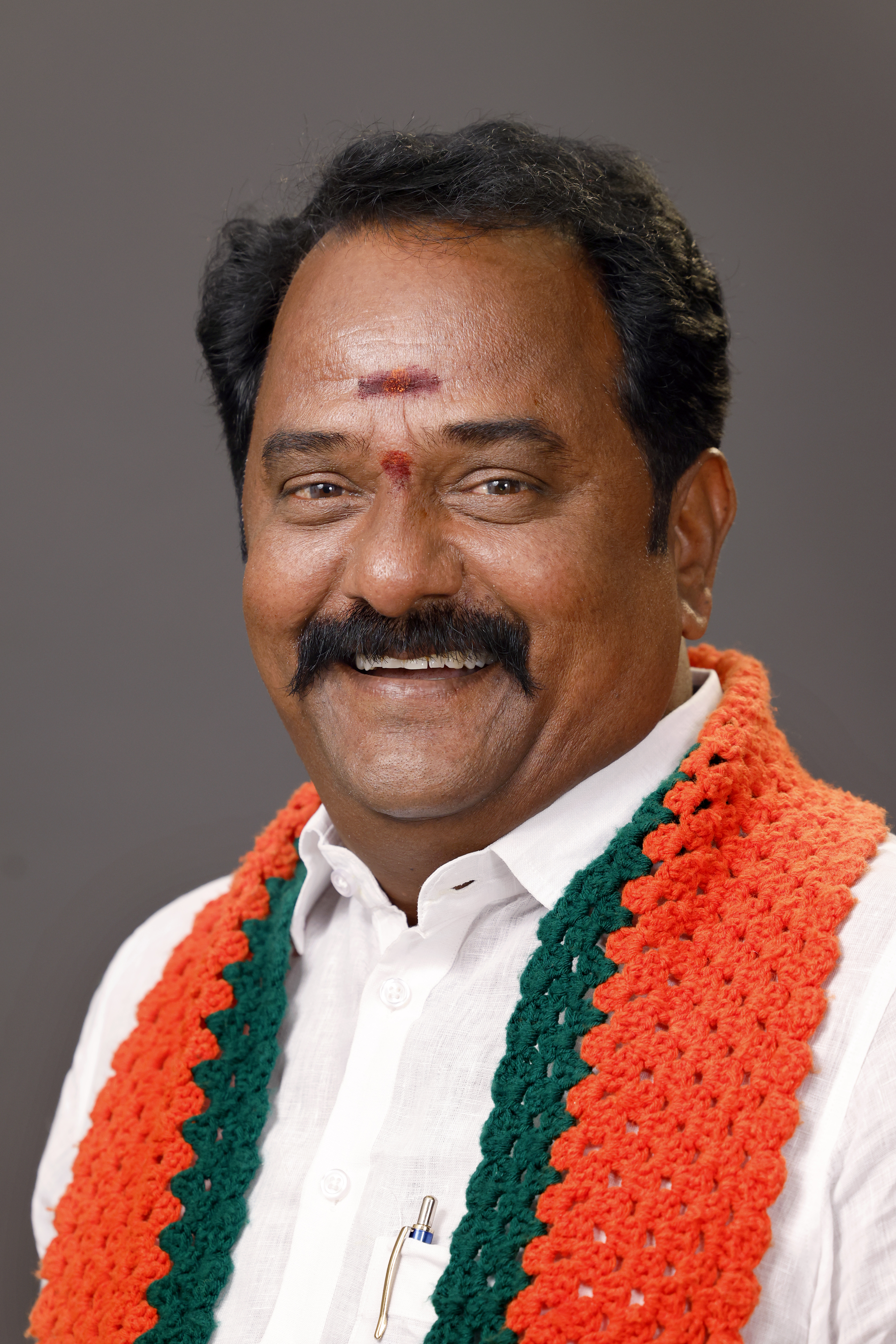

Member of Telangana Legislative Assembly
- Incumbent
- Assumed office 3 December 2023
- Preceded by: Gampa Govardhan
- Constituency: Kamareddy

Personal details
- Party: Bharatiya Janata Party (2018 - present)
- Other political affiliations: Indian National Congress (until 2014); Y. S. R. Congress (2014 - 2018)

Katipally Venkata Ramana Reddy (born 1970) is an Indian politician from Telangana. He is a member of the Telangana Legislative Assembly from Kamareddy Assembly constituency representing the Bharatiya Janata Party. In the 2023 Telangana Legislative Assembly election, he defeated both the incumbent chief minister K. Chandrashekar Rao and the then to-be-elected chief minister Revanth Reddy. He defeated his nearest rival, KCR, by 6741 votes.

Ramana Reddy was appointed the BJP Legislature Party deputy leader on 14 February 2024.

== Personal life ==
Ramana Reddy is a businessperson from Kamareddy, Telangana. He dropped out of formal education after his Class 12. His father, Katipally Raji Reddy, was a Kamareddy panchayat samiti president. In an affidavit filed to the Election Commission of India, he declared assets amounting to ₹49 crore (US$5.1 million).

== Career ==
Reddy worked as a Zilla Parishad member in the undivided Nizamabad district in 2004 and became ZP chairman. Earlier, he worked in the Indian National Congress and when Y. S. Rajasekhara Reddy, the then chief minister of undivided Andhra Pradesh died, he joined YSR Congress Party.Before the 2018 elections, he joined BJP and contested as MLA but finished a distant third. In recent years, he is credited with taking up local issues. His donations and support in supplying building materials for the construction of temples in the constituency is said to be one of the reasons that helped him gain a voter base. He also spearheaded the agitation to oppose the 'Master Plan' for Kamareddy that was mooted by the then BRS government.

In the 2023 Telangana Legislative Assembly election, he ran as Bharatiya Janata Party candidate for the Kamareddy Assembly constituency seat. He defeated both Bharat Rashtra Samithi's incumbent chief minister K. Chandrashekar Rao, and Indian National Congress's chief minister candidate Revanth Reddy who became chief minister following the election. BJP won in the Kamareddy Assembly constituency seat for the first-time .

== Election results ==
Year	Office	Constituency	Party	Result	Votes gained	Vote share%	Margin	Ref
2023	Member of the Legislative Assembly	Kamareddy Assembly constituency	BJP	Won	66,652	34.55%	6741	
2018	Member of the Legislative Assembly	Kamareddy Assembly constituency	BJP	Lost	15439	9.52%	52728	
