= Nizam Sagar Dam =

Nizam Sagar
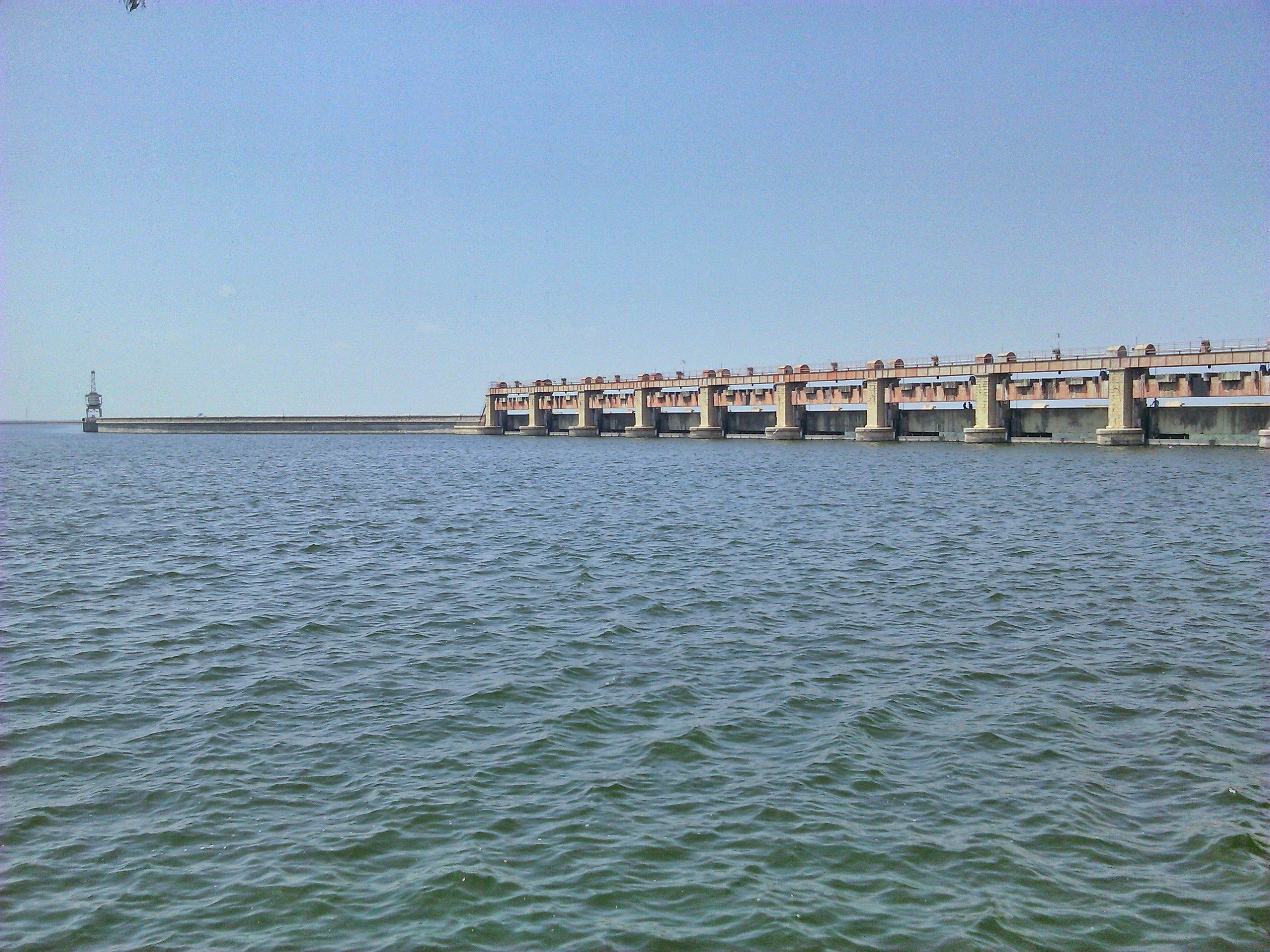

- Location within Telangana Location within India
- Location: Kamareddy, Telangana, India
- Coordinates: 18°12′09″N 77°55′26″E
- Construction began: 1923
- Opening date: 1931; 95 years ago

Dam and spillways
- Impounds: Manjira River
- Height: 95.72 m (314.0 ft)
- Length: 3 km (1.9 mi)

Reservoir
- Total capacity: 29.72 tmc ft

Nizam Sagar Dam is an Indian dam named after the Nizam of Hyderabad. It is a reservoir constructed across the Manjira River, a tributary of the Godavari River, between Achampet and BanjePally villages of the Kamareddy district in Telangana, India. It is located at about 144 km (89 mi) north-west of Hyderabad. Nizam Sagar is the oldest dam in the state of Telangana.

== History ==
Nizamsagar dam was constructed in 1923 by Mir Osman Ali Khan - the 7th Nizam of the erstwhile Hyderabad State. It was made by emptying over 40 villages length:3 km (1.9 mi).. The dam has an effective storage capacity of 724.9 Mcm (million cubic meters) or 25.6 tmc ft

== The dam ==
Before Nizam Sagar was built, the Manjira River was not properly harnessed and little water was being used by diverting water at Ghanpur Anicut for Irrigating about 5,000 acres (2,000 ha) and an open Channel called Mahaboob Nagar (Right Canal) in Medak District. The Ghanpur Anicut was the first scheme constructed across Manjira river in 1904 at a cost of Rs.18.00 Lakhs. Some years later, Nawab Ali Nawaj Jung Bahadur as Superintending Engineer added Fatch Nahar (Left canal) to increase the utility of the river later. The ayacut of 17,308 acres (7,004 ha) was being irrigated under this Ghanpur Anicut that subsequently increased to 30,000 acres (12,000 ha) as per actuals.

Nizam sagar Project is the second irrigation scheme on Manjira river and the largest in the then Hyderabad state taken up during the year 1923 and completed by the year 1931. This Project was originally contemplated for utilization of 58.00 TMC of water to irrigate275,000 acres (111,000 ha) acres in Banswada, Bodhan, Nizamabad and Armoor Taluks of Nizamabad District. After reorganization of States in 1956, the Manjira basin was distributed among the three states viz., Maharashtra, Karnataka and Telangana.

Different irrigation schemes have come up in above three states. Some of them to mention are:

Manjira Barrage and Singur Project in Telangana to meet the drinking water needs of twin cities of Hyderabad and Secunderabad in Telangana.

Karanja Project, Choukinala Project in Karnataka, Lower Tiruna Project, Manjira Project in Maharashtra State. Therefore, the inflows into Nizamsagar Project and as well as the low flows at Ghanpur Anicut during lean periods have dwindled considerably. Added to this the silting of reservoir has been at greater pace than designed for. From the investigation conducted by the A,.P.E.R.L. (Andhra Pradesh Engineering and Research Laboratories) Hyderabad in 1973, it was shown that the capacity of 29.7 TMC at original FRL of RL + 1,400.50 ft (426.87 m) has been reduced to 11.8 TMC. In the remodeling proposals F.R.L. has been raised from +1,400.50 ft (426.87 m) to +1,405.00 ft (428.24 m) and the capacity at this new FRL of + 1,405.00 ft (428.24 m) is 17.80 TMC.

Apart from the above changes, out of the total localized ayacut of 275,000 acres (111,000 ha), 28,085 acres (11,366 ha) have come under submergence of Sreeramsagar Project, 8,296 acres (3,357 ha) have come in the command of Lakshmi canal and Kakatiya Canal of Sreeramsagar Project, and 7,260 acres (2,940 ha) ayacut has not been getting water since inception of Nizamsagar Project. Thus, the settled ayacut of 275,000 acres (111,000 ha) has come down to 231,339 acres (93,620 ha).

The local people believe that everyone should visit this place at least once in whole life to make it complete.

In view of the above enumerated facts, the inflows into Nizamsagar Project not only reduced but also delayed resulting in not only in the delayed commencement of agricultural operations in the ayacut but also some times loss of crop due to insufficient water supply. The problem has become more acute during the years 1972–73, 1993–94 and 1994–95.Babli dam

== Salient features ==
Location: Achampet (Vill), Nizamsagar (Mandal) Kamareddy Dist. (Telangana)

Longitude: 76° –56’ East Latitude: 18° – 10’ North River/Basin: Manjira / Godavari 21,694 km (8376 Sq.Miles.)

i) Maharashtra: 10,474 km (6,508 mi)

ii) Karnataka: 4,015 km (2,495 mi)

ii) Andhra Pradesh: 7,205 km (4,477 mi)

Water spreads:

a) At MWL: 146.36 km (56.51 Sq.Miles)

b) At FRL: 129.50 km (50.00 Sq.Miles)

RESERVOIR DATA OLD NEW A) F.R.L. : +1400.50 +1405.00 B) M.W.L. : +1405.00 +1405.00 C)MDDL : +1376.00 D)Sill of regulator : +1364.00 E) TBL : +1412.00 1) ORIGINAL DESIGNED M.F.D. 1) Computed M.F.D. from C.A.: 5,25,000 C/s. 2) Proposed disposal: 4,73,577 C/s.

Area Irrigated:

i) Cultivatable command area: 2.75 Lakhs Acres.

ii) Area localized: 2.31 Lakhs Acres.

CAPACITY OF THE RESERVOIR. A) Gross: 29,716 Mcft. B) Live: 25,600 Mcft. C) Present capacity at +1405’: 17,803 Mcft. D) Present capacity @MDDL +1376’: 786 Mcft. Height of dam above River Bed: 115.50 ft. Top width of dam: 14’-0" i) Gravity: 10,100 ft. ii)Composite: 5,200 ft Scouring sluice: 9 V. 8’x12’ Regulator sluices: 11 V.8’x10.5’ Main Canal: Off tae at R/F. Saddla Power House

== Interstate Dispute ==
The water use entitlement of this project is 58 thousand million cubic feet (tmc) at 75% dependability (i.e. sufficient water is available in 3 out of 4 years) under Godavari Water Disputes Tribunal (GWDT). However the water dependability has reduced to 33% (i.e. sufficient water is available only once in 3 years) in last decade due to more water utilization by Maharashtra and Karnataka by developing excessive water use potential beyond their water use entitlements given by GWDT. Karnataka has constructed four barrages across the Manjira river and three more are under construction. Similarly, Maharashtra state constructed at least 30 barrages on main tributaries of Manjira river downstream of major dams for recharging ground water, drinking water and irrigation purposes. This very old major irrigation project has become unproductive for want of water inflows. Also the water quality / salinity & alkalinity of inflows into this reservoir is becoming unsafe for irrigation use and human & cattle consumption. The ground water is also turning into high salinity & alkalinity water.

Recently, the water scarcity problem of Pochampadu irrigation system is some extent resolved by supreme court but acute water scarcity faced by Nizam sagar irrigation project is not yet addressed. Supreme court verdict (section 83 ii b) on Babli Project dispute stipulated that the gates of Babhali barrage remain lifted during the monsoon season, i.e., 1 July to 28 October and there is no obstruction to the natural flow of Godavari river during monsoon season below the three dams (Paithan, Siddheshwar & Nizamsagar dams) mentioned in Clause II (i) of the agreement dated 06.10.1975 towards Pochampad dam. Thus Pochampadu reservoir is accorded first priority over any other reservoir (major, medium, minor, barrage, etc.) to receive the water generated from the Godavari basin area located below these three dams. As stipulated by Supreme court, central government has set up monitoring committee to implement / supervise the water sharing as per agreement dated 06.10.1975 and supreme court verdict. Telangana government shall take the dispute to supreme court to resolve the water scarcity problem of Nizam sagar irrigation project at the earliest as Maharashtra and Karnataka states are using in excess of permitted water by building new projects and the water availability is becoming more and more grim in the downstream Telangana state.

== See also ==
- Godavari River Basin Irrigation Projects
- List of dams and reservoirs in India
- Sriram Sagar Project
- Icchampally Project
- Krishna Water Disputes Tribunal
