= Venkampally =

Venkampally is a village in Kamareddy district in the state of Telangana in India.
