= Singur Reservoir =

Reservoir in Telangana, India

Coordinates: 17.82°N 77.88°E

Singur Reservoir is a reservoir formed by back waters of Singur Dam located on Manjira River in Medak District, Telangana, India. It is a sustained drinking water source of Hyderabad city.

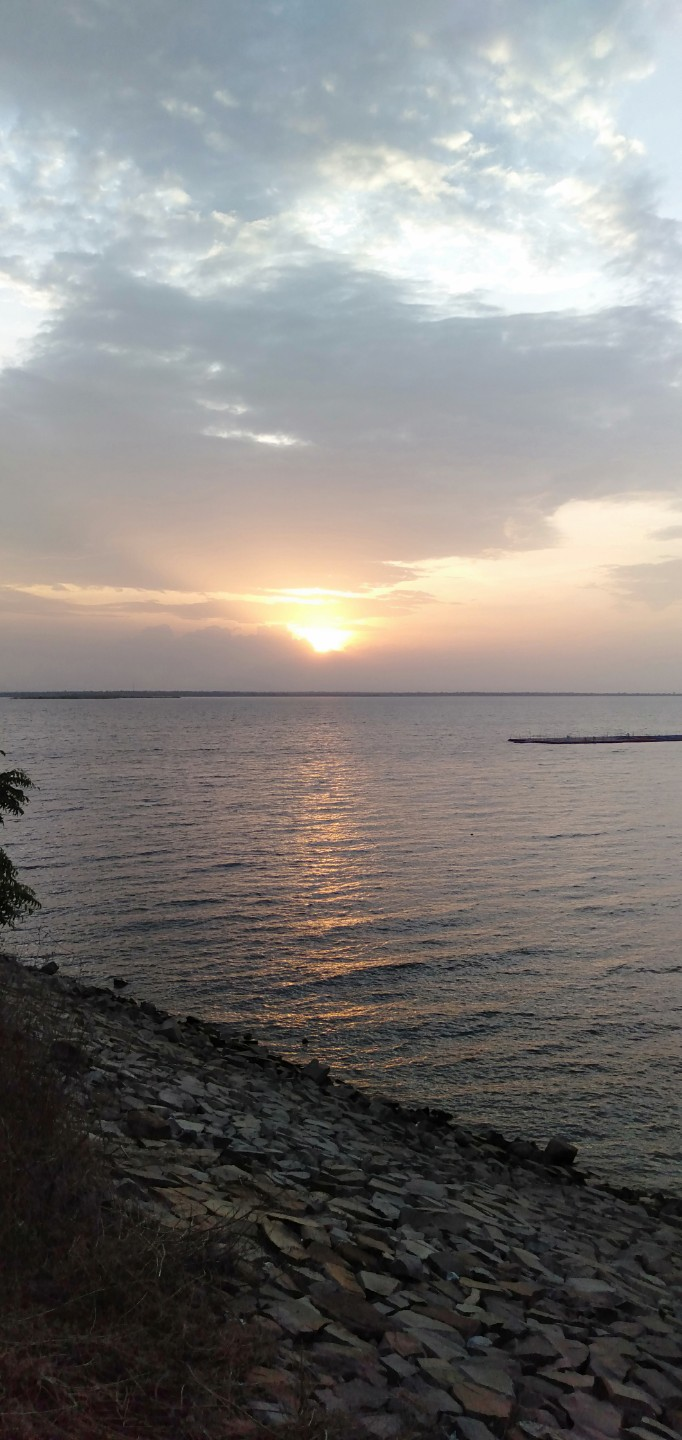
Sunset at Singoor Reservoir
