= Banswada =

- Town
- Location in Telangana state, India Banswada (India)
- Coordinates: 18.3833°N 77.8833°E
- Country: India
- State: Telangana
- District: Kamareddy

Government
  - Type: Municipality
  - Body: Municipal council
  - MLA: (Pocharam Srinivas Reddy) (INC)

Area
  - Total: 15.96 km^{2} (6.16 sq mi)
- Elevation: 371 m (1,217 ft)

Population (2011)
  - Total: 28,384
  - Density: 1,778/km^{2} (4,606/sq mi)

Languages
  - Official: Telugu, Urdu
- Time zone: UTC+5:30 (IST)
- PIN: 503187,503190,503194
- Telephone code: 08466
- Vehicle registration: TG 17
- Lok Sabha constituency: Zahirabad
- Vidhan Sabha constituency: Banswada
- Website: telangana.gov.in

Banswada is a Town and Revenue division in Kamareddy district of the Indian state of Telangana.

== Geography ==
Banswada is located at 18.3833°N 77.8833°E. It has an average elevation of 371 meters (1220 feet).

== Politics ==
Earlier, Banswada was a major Grama Panchayat with 20 election wards. Then, after 11 January 2018, Banswada was upgraded to municipality grade 3 .MCB (Purapalaka Sangam Banswada). It was also the filming location for the film Fidaa. In July 2019 Banswada municipality is divided in to 19 election wards, Banswada municipality electors are above 20000, total municipality population above 34000.

== Transport ==
Banswada is situated on Hyderabad-Medak-Bodhan- Bhainsa National Highway No. 765D. The nearest railway stations are at Nizamabad, Bodhan and Kamareddy. The Telangana State Road Transport Corporation operates bus services from Banswada to many cities and towns. Banswada (BSWD) has a TSRTC depot, which opened on 6 March 1993. Many buses from Banswada to Warangal (via Nizamabad), Adilabad, Bidar, Aurad, Hanegaon, Malegaon-Chandegaon, Hyderabad, JBS, Pitlam-JBS, Bichkunda-JBS, Bodhan-Hyderabad, Nizamabad-Hyderabad, Kamareddy-JBS, Medak-Hyderabad, Medak-Jbs, Deglore, Udgir, Kangti, Zehirabad, Sangareddy, Patancher, and Degulwadi.

== Assembly constituency ==
Banswada is an assembly constituency in Telangana. Pocharam Srinivas Reddy from the Telangana Rashtra Samithi was elected in the 2018 Assembly Elections as a Member of the Legislative Assembly (MLA), earlier he resigned for the cause of Separate State of Telangana and joined the Bharat Rashtra Samithi party on 25 March 2011. The Election Commission has re-conducted bypoll elections. This time Pocharam Srinivas Reddy has won the elections from the Bharat Rashtra Samithi party with a huge majority of nearly 50,000 votes on 17 October 2011.

== Health services ==
There is one area hospital under Telangana Vaidya Vidhana Parishad in Kamareddy district.

- Anvita Hospital
- Babu Shinde Hospital
- Jivan Reddy Hospital
- Balaji Hospital
- Global dental Hospital
- Bindu shree Hospital
- Jagruti Hospital
- Manjeera Multi Speciality Hospital
- 7 Hills Hospital
- Samskar Naturecure Manthena Ashram.

== In popular culture ==
Some parts of the movie Fidaa was shot in Banswada, which made the place a tourist spot for sometime.
