= Tadwai =

Coordinates: 18°21′16″N 78°13′01″E

- Mandal
- Interactive map of Tadwai
- Country: India
- State: Telangana
- District: Kamareddy

Languages
  - Official: Telugu
- Time zone: UTC+5:30 (IST)
- Vehicle registration: TS 17
- Nearest city: Kamareddy

Tadwai is a village and a mandal in Kamareddy district in the state of Telangana in India, located between Kamareddy and Nijamsagar.

Tadwai is home to the Sri Sadguru Shri Shabari Mathaji Ashram. Every year, several Lakhs of devotees gather here to celebrate Rama Navami and Datta Jayanthi. It is a spiritual center of the Telangana region and also Central India. People from various parts of the world visit this ashram throughout the year.
