= Machareddy =

Coordinates: 18°21′35″N 78°24′53″E

Machareddy మాచారెడ్డి
- Village
- Interactive map of Machareddy
- Country: India
- State: Telangana

Government
  - Type: Assembly constituency
  - Body: Kamareddy Assembly constituency

Population
  - Total: 5,053

Languages
  - Official: Telugu
- Time zone: UTC+5:30 (IST)
- Postal code: 503111
- Area code: 08468
- Vehicle registration: TS 17
- Website: telangana.gov.in

Machareddy is a village and a mandal in Nizamabad district in the state of Telangana. It is located 20 km towards from district headquarters Kamareddy. The majority of speakers speak Telugu. The locals call Machareddy "మాచారెడ్డి" in Telugu. The city is a part of the Kamareddy Assembly Constituency and it and other towns in the district have elected Katipally Venkata Ramana Reddy as the person to represent them in India's paralimentary system. Its PIN code is 503111.

== Climate ==
The climate of Machareddy is not very humid while being hot. Temperatures average 20 to 30 degrees Celsius. The sky will most often look clear, however there can be times where clouds can be overcast or broken up.

== Census Data ==
51% of the population are females, and 49% are males. Only about half of the population are literate and consequently, only half are eligible to work most jobs. Even then, most people prefer to work in the farms or the fields. 1173 houses exist within the village, implying that on average every house contains four to five people.

== Schools ==
Zilla Parishad High School (girls)

Zilla Parishad High School Jangam Palli

Zilla Parishad High School Machareddy

Zilla Parishad High School Chukkapoor

Zilla Parishad High School Boys Bhiknoor

== Agriculture ==
Paddy is the main source of growing agriculture where commodities grow in this village. Beedies are the main product manufactured in this village. The total irrigated area in this village consists of 224.4 hectares, of which 74.8 hectares are from boreholes/tube wells, 115.6 hectares from lakes or tanks, and 34 hectares from rain water.
