= Babli project =

Coordinates: 18°51′12″N 77°49′14″E

The Babli project / barrage is a controversial reservoir project being constructed by Maharashtra across the river Godavari, disputed by Telangana. The Supreme Court of India delivered a ruling after seven years in favour of Maharashtra with the Andhra Pradesh government expected to appeal against it.

== History ==
The dispute arises from the fact that S.B. Chavan and Jalagam Vengal Rao reached an agreement in October 1975, which was later made part of the Godavari Water Disputes Tribunal (GWDT) Award. As per the terms of the pact, Maharashtra could utilise 60 tmcft (thousand million cubic feet) of Godavari water while Andhra Pradesh could go ahead with building the Sriram Sagar Project (SRSP) and utilise the rest of the water.

== Water Allocation ==
Telangana contended that Maharashtra has used up its quota in course of time by building four projects. Yet, in an action without precedent, Maharashtra began construction of the Babli project on the foreshores of SRSP and many small projects upstream.

Eighteen lakh acres under the SRSP ayacut in the Telangana state will become barren if Maharashtra is allowed to have its way.

== Legal battle ==
As per a report, dated 30 Jan 2012 even when Andhra Pradesh is waging a legal battle against Maharashtra's Babli barrage and eleven other barrages across the Godavari river, Maharashtra has agreed to Andhra Pradesh's proposal for constituting an Inter State Board (ISB) for implementing the Rs 403 billion mega Pranahita Chevella lift irrigation scheme. With this green signal, Andhra Pradesh has overcome a major hurdle in making its dream project a reality.

== 2013 Supreme Court ruling ==
The Supreme Court ruled in favour of Maharashtra, with safeguards contained in the judgment included the stipulation to open Babli gates during the monsoon period (July to October ) to allow inflows to SRSP. The Union Cabinet on 17 October 2013 gave its approval for Constitution of the 3-Members Supervisory Committee on the Babhali Barrage to implement the directions of the Supreme Court.

== See also ==
- Sriram Sagar Project
- Nizam Sagar
