= Kaveri River water dispute =

Water conflict in India

Kaveri river basin

The sharing of waters of the Kaveri river has been the source of conflict between the Indian states of Tamil Nadu and Karnataka. The 802 km (498 mi)–long Kaveri river originates at Talakaveri in the Western Ghats in Karnataka, and flows for about 320 km (200 mi) before entering Tamil Nadu. It flows further eastward in Tamil Nadu for 416 km (258 mi) before flowing into the Bay of Bengal near Poompuhar in Tamil Nadu. The basin area consists of 44,000 km^{2} in Tamil Nadu and 32,000 km^{2} in Karnataka.

The conflict stems from the agreements made in 1892 and 1924 between the Kingdom of Mysore and the Madras Presidency during the British Raj. After the Indian Independence in 1947, the states were re-organised, with the erstwhile Madras Presidency being split between various states, majorly Tamil Nadu and Andhra, and parts of the Kaveri basin became part of Kerala and Puducherry. After the expiry of the 1924 agreement in 1974, Karnataka demanded its due share of water from the river stating that the pre-Independence agreements are invalid and favored the Madras Presidency due to its expanse at the time, and demanded a renegotiated settlement. However, Tamil Nadu argued that it has about 3 million acres of land under cultivation, which is heavily dependent on the river water, and any change in the existing water sharing pattern would adversely affect the livelihood of millions of farmers in the state.

Two decades of negotiations between the parties yielded no result. In 1990, the Supreme Court of India directed the Government of India to constitute the Cauvery Water Disputes Tribunal. The tribunal gave an interim award in June 1991 that was based on its 10-year calculation of average inflow of water into Tamil Nadu, and though deemed unfair by Karnataka, it adhered to it as the Supreme Court upheld the same. The tribunal gave its final allocation on 5 February 2007, which was only announced by the Indian government on 20 February 2013. The final award made an annual allocation of 419 tmcft to Tamil Nadu, 270 tmcft to Karnataka, 30 tmcft to Kerala, and 7 tmcft to Puducherry. Karnataka was also specified to release a certain amount of water as designated every month.

In 2013, the Supreme Court issued a direction to the union government to establish an supervisory committee to implement the order. Following further litigation, on 16 February 2018, the Supreme Court pronounced its verdict, allocating 404.25 tmcft to Tamil Nadu and 284.75 tmcft to Karnataka, while the allocations for the others remained the same. As per the orders, the Cauvery Water Management Authority was created by the union government on 1 June 2018, and the Cauvery Water Regulation Committee was created three weeks later. The dispute, however, did not end there, and further review petitions and request for clarifications have been filed with the committee and the courts. Over the years, the dispute has also resulted in widespread protests, demonstrations, and riots in Karnataka and Tamil Nadu.

== Kaveri river ==
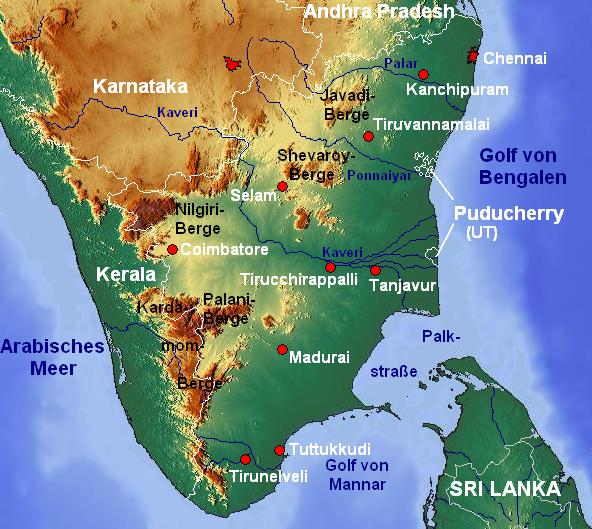
The Kaveri originates in Karnataka and later flows through Tamil Nadu

The Kaveri river system is one of the major river systems in South India. It arises at Talakaveri in the Brahmagiri Hills of the Western Ghats in Karnataka. Once it leaves the Kodagu hills, it flows eastwards onto the Deccan Plateau and widens to 900–1,200 ft (270–370 m) before flowing south-east. At Shivanasamudra, the river drops 91 m (299 ft) and forms the Shivanasamudra Falls, after which it passes through the Mekedatu gorge. After flowing for 320 km (200 mi) in Karnataka, the river flows for about 64 km (40 mi) along the Karnataka-Tamil Nadu border.

The river enters Tamil Nadu and forms the Hogenakkal Falls. After the falls, the river flows southwards towards Mettur Dam and joins its main right bank tributary Bhavani at Kooduthurai. The river flows eastwards and widens further before splitting into two branches near Tiruchirappalli. After flowing for 16 km (9.9 mi), the two branches converge around the Srirangam island. The river further branches off into 36 different channels before emptying into the Bay of Bengal near Poompuhar in Mayiladuthurai district. The river traverses for about 416 km (258 mi) in Tamil Nadu for a total length of about 800 km (500 mi). The basin area of the river is spread over 44,000 km^{2} in Tamil Nadu and 32,000 km^{2} in Karnataka.

== British era ==
The early precursor for the dispute arose during the British Raj in 1807 when the Madras Presidency wrote to the princely state of Mysore regarding the usage of the Kaveri water by Mysore, which it considered as detrimental to Madras. In 1881, the princely state of Mysore planned irrigation projects using water from the Kaveri river, but was met with resistance from the Madras Presidency. A conference held in 1890 between the two parties resulted in an agreement signed in 1892 which aimed to meet the needs of both states.

In 1910, Krishnaraja Wodeyar, the ruler of Mysore, drafted a plan to construct a dam at Kannambadi with a capacity to hold up to 41.5 tmcft of water. However, Madras opposed the plan as it had its own plans of building a dam at Mettur which could hold up to 80 tmcft of water. While the British Raj gave permission to Mysore to build a dam that could store 11 tmcft, the dam was designed to hold the 41.5 tmcft as per the original plan. This led to further dispute amongst the two parties and the British government sent the matter to arbitration under the 1892 Agreement. The award was declared on 12 May 1914, which allowed Mysore to construct the dam with a permitted capacity of 11 tmcft. The decision was appealed by the Madras Presidency which eventually led to a new agreement in 1924. As per the agreement, Mysore was allowed to construct the Krishna Raja Sagara dam and Madras was let to build the Mettur Dam. It was agreed to give 75% of the surplus water of the Kaveri to Madras, with Mysore getting 23%, and the remaining to Travancore-Cochin.

== Post-Independence ==
=== 1950s ===
After Indian independence in 1947, and the reorganisation of the Indian states based on linguistic lines in 1956, the regions of the ertswhile territories of Mysore and Madras largely became part of Mysore State (which was renamed as Karnataka later) and Madras State (which was renamed as Tamil Nadu later) respectively. Parts of the Kaveri basin which earlier formed part of Madras Presidency went to Kerala, and the union territory of Puducherry. The reorganisation also resulted in some of the river's tributaries to be in Kerala. As a result, both Kerala and Puducherry became invested in the sharing of the waters of the Kaveri river. In the late 1950s, Madras planned to implement three new projects based on the river, which was objected to by Mysore on the grounds that they were not permitted as per the 1924 agreement.

=== 1970s ===
Dispute arose when Mysore took on new projects on the river, which was opposed by Madras. As the 1924 agreement came closer to its end date, differences arose between Karnataka and Tamil Nadu regarding the interpretation of the same. Karnataka believed that the agreement had to expire as did not address water issues pertaining to the time as the state boundaries had changed. Tamil Nadu believed that the agreement was meant to be reviewed after 50 years, and it should not be let to expire because it served as a foundation for developmental projects for both states and if altered, it would harm both the states. Tamil Nadu wanted a tribunal established under the Interstate River Water Disputes Act of 1956 to address the conflict, which was turned down by the union government. A subsequent report on the union-state relations was created by the Government of Tamil Nadu, which recommended that the Supreme Court of India should handle the interstate water disputes and ensure that its decisions are implemented.

In 1971, petitions were submitted to the Supreme Court requesting that the union government should send the dispute to a tribunal under the Interstate River Water Disputes Act of 1956. In May 1972, Kerala, Mysore, and Tamil Nadu agreed to discussions on the matter, and let the union government establish a Cauvery fact finding committee, the results of which were deliberated during further discussions. In August 1976, the three parties agreed to a share of 489 tmcft to Tamil Nadu, 177 tmcft to Karnataka, and 5 tmcft to Kerala. Of the surplus water, Karnataka was entitled to 53%, Tamil Nadu to 30%, and the remaining was awarded to Kerala. It was also agreed to form a Cauvery Valley Authority which would be headed by a Central Water Commission member, but this committee was never established due to political reasons. In 1977, Tamil Nadu rejected the draft agreement stating that the 1924 agreement be allowed for an extension but not a review and that the 1892 and 1924 agreements should be reinstated.

=== 1980s ===
Despite having 26 meetings mediated by the union government between 1968 and 1990 to resolve the Kaveri water dispute, an agreement could not be reached. After the lapse of the previous agreement, a crisis management system was established for 15 years, with Tamil Nadu requesting more water annually to support agriculture. In 1983, the Society for the Protection of the Irrigation and Agricultural Rights of the Tamil Nadu Farmers of the Cauvery filed a petition with the Supreme Court requesting the union government to establish a Cauvery Water Disputes Tribunal (CWDT). During the initial hearing of the petition, the Supreme Court encouraged the states to negotiate a water sharing deal, but they were unable to agree to a solution. The case remained pending with the Supreme Court for nearly seven years, and in 1989, the Tamil Nadu government passed a resolution that the dispute be referred to a tribunal if no agreement can be reached.

=== 1990s ===
On 4 May 1990, the Supreme Court instructed the union government to set up the CWDT. The three-man tribunal was constituted on 2 June 1990 and was headed by Chittatosh Mookerjee. The tribunal was later formed and heard arguments from all four parties–three states and Puducherry. Tamil Nadu and Karnataka requested for 566 and 465 tmcft respectively, with Kerala asking for a share of 99.8 tmcft, and Puducherry requested 9.3 tmcft. The tribunal gave an interim award on 25 June 1991 that was based on its 10-year calculation of average inflow of water from Karnataka into Tamil Nadu. It instructed Karnataka to provide 205 tmcft to Tamil Nadu annually and specified the weekly and monthly stipulations for the same. It also stipulated that the crop area irrigated by the Kaveri waters should not exceed 1.12 million hectares in Karnataka. Karnataka deemed the order as inimical to its interests and issued an ordinance seeking to annul the tribunal's award. The Supreme Court stepped in to strike down the ordinance and upheld the tribunal's award which was subsequently gazetted by the union government on 11 December 1991. As Karnataka was forced to accept the interim award, widespread demonstrations and violence broke out in parts of Karnataka, which resulted in targeting of Tamil families, with many forced to flee from Bangalore in fear of being attacked and lynched by pro-Kannada activists with the behest of the state government. The violence continued in the Tamil populated parts of Bangalore for nearly a month before it was brought in control.

In 1995, after a poor monsoon, Karnataka was not able to fulfill the obligations of the interim order of CWDT, and had a cumulative deficit of 26.6 tmcft in May and June. Tamil Nadu approached the Supreme Court demanding the immediate release of at least 30 tmcft of water, and the Supreme Court asked the state to approach the tribunal. The tribunal recommended that Karnataka release 11 tmcft of water by December and 17.4 tmcft by May next year. Tamil Nadu now went back to the Supreme Court demanding that Karnataka be forced to obey the tribunal's order, and the court recommended that the prime minister intervene to find a solution. The prime minister convened a meeting with the chief ministers of the two states on 30 December, after which it was agreed that Karnataka would release 6 tmcft instead of the 11 tmcft that the tribunal ordered, and the state complied with it.

In 1997, the union government proposed to set up the Cauvery River Authority (CRA), with powers to take control of the reservoirs in the states. This was opposed by Karnataka, as it argued that the authority had too much powers, which intruded into the state's jurisdiction. Hence, in 1998, the CRA was established with limited powers to adjudicate the river water dispute with the prime minister as the chairperson and the chief ministers of the four states and union territories as members. A Cauvery Monitoring Committee was constituted, headed by the union secretary of water resources and consisting of engineers, and other officers, which was to provide periodical report to the CRA. After the formation of the CRA, the Tamil Nadu government withdrew its case regarding the implementation of the tribunal award before the Supreme Court.

=== 2000s ===
In the summer of 2002, due to low rainfall, reservoirs levels fell in Karnataka and Tamil Nadu. This led to the flare up of the issue again, and the CRA could not find an effective solution. Tamil Nadu blamed Karnataka for the failure of crops in the state, while Karnataka retorted that it did not have enough water in the Kaveri river to irrigate the lands in the state. The order passed during a similar crisis in 1995-96, had not addressed how future conflicts would be handled. With Tamil Nadu demanding that Karnataka honour the interim award and release to Tamil Nadu its proportionate share, and Karnataka on the other hand refusing to do so given that the water levels were hardly enough to meet its own demands, the case went to the CRA, and later the Supreme Court.

After the CRA meeting on 27 August was inconclusive, the Supreme Court ordered Karnataka to release 1.25 tmcft of water every day unless the CRA revised it. The issue led to protests, agitations, and riots in both Karnataka and Tamil Nadu. The CRA revised the order and asked Karnataka to release 0.8 tmcft daily, after a meeting on 8 September, which was boycotted by Tamil Nadu. As the Karnataka government defied the order, and did not release the water as stipulated, the Tamil Nadu government filed a petition with the Supreme Court. After the Supreme Court condemned the Karnataka government for defying the orders of the court and the CRA, Karnataka was ordered to comply with the award. It was also critical of Tamil Nadu's decision to approach the court, and the lack of confidence in the CRA.

The term of the CWDT was initially set to expire in August 2005, and was extended by one year, following the amendment to the Inter-state water disputes Act. The tribunal concluded the final hearing and arguments in April 2006, and was given another extension in August 2006 as it had not reached a verdict. The CWDT announced its final verdict on 5 February 2007. According to its verdict, Tamil Nadu was awarded 419 tmcft of the Kaveri river waters while Karnataka got 270 tmcft, with Kerala and Puducherry getting 30 tmcft and 7 tmcft respectively. It also laid down the terms for monthly release of water from Karnataka to Tamil Nadu. The tribunal directed that the upper riparian states should not engage in any activities detrimental to the other parties. It also laid down that, in case of a reduction in water levels, the allocation of the states shall be reduced proportionately. However, unhappy with the award, both Tamil Nadu and Karnataka filed a revised petition, and challenged the same before the Supreme Court.

=== 2010s ===
==== 2012 ====
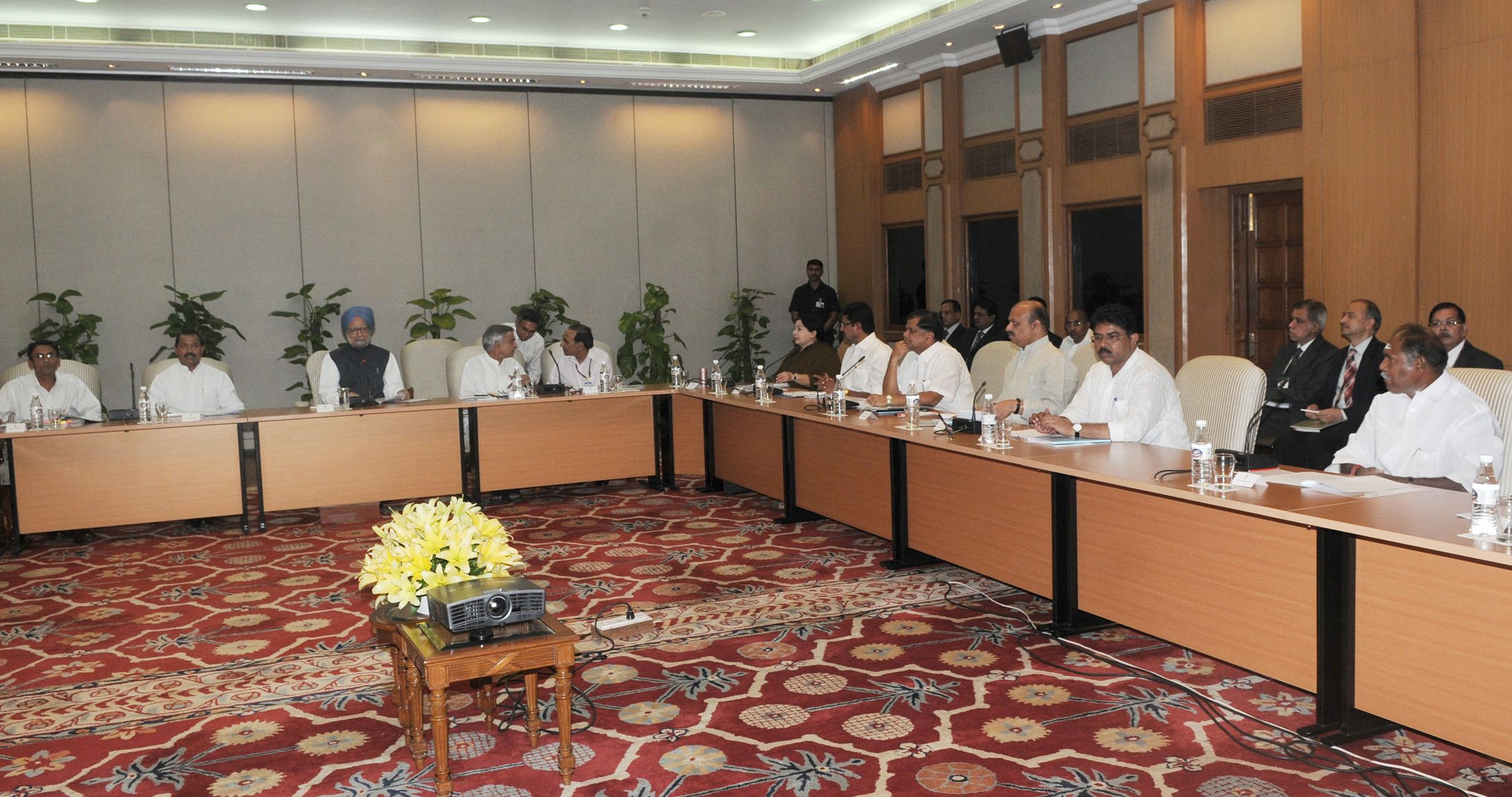
Cauvery River Authority meeting chaired by then prime minister Manmohan Singh at New Delhi in September 2012

On 19 September 2012, the CRA ordered Karnataka to release 9,000 cusecs of water per day to Tamil Nadu. However, Karnataka felt that this was impractical due to the drought conditions prevailing because of the failed monsoon, and filed a review petition before the authority on 21 September, seeking review of its 19 September ruling. On 28 September 2012, the Supreme Court criticized the Karnataka government for failing to comply with the directive of the CRA. Karnataka complied with the order, which led to wide protests and violence in parts of Bengaluru. On 4 October 2012, the Karnataka government filed a review petition before the Supreme Court seeking a stay on its 28 September order directing it to release 9,000 cusecs of water everyday to Tamil Nadu, until 15 October. On 6 October, several pro-Kannada organisations, called for a bandh in protest against the Cauvery water release.

On 8 October, the Supreme Court ordered that the release of 9,000 cusecs had to be continued and asked the CRA to ensure the same. However, after the CRA rejected the review plea from Karnataka, the Karnataka government stopped the release of Kaveri water to Tamil Nadu on the same day. On 17 October, Tamil Nadu made a fresh plea in the Supreme Court, reiterating its demand for appropriate directions to be issued to Karnataka to release the shortfall of 48 tmcft of water as per the distress sharing formula stipulated by the CWDT. On 15 November 2012, the CRA directed the Karnataka government to release 4.81 tmcft of water to Tamil Nadu between 16 and 30 November. On 6 December, the Supreme Court further directed Karnataka to release 10,000 cusecs of water to Tamil Nadu. It further questioned the union government as to why the final decision of CWDT, which was given in February 2007, was yet to be officially gazetted.

On 29 November 2012, Tamil Nadu Chief Minister J. Jayalalithaa met Karnataka Chief Minister Jagadish Shettar, following the Supreme Court's suggestion to resolve the dispute through bilateral talks. It was the first such meeting between the chief ministers of the two states since 1997. However, the meeting failed to resolve the deadlock, and both states subsequently continued engaging in legal proceedings to sort the dispute.

==== 2013 ====
On 20 February 2013, the union government notified the final award of CWDT. The award divided the annual allocation of 740 tmcft for water among four parties. In case of water availability of 50% or below from a normal water year when the total water availability in the basin was 740 tmcft, the allocation would be reduced proportionately. The allocation would be calculated along with unused water in the reservoirs at the beginning of the year in the basin. While Karnataka was to release stipulated amount of water monthly to meet the allocation of 419 tmcft of water to Tamil Nadu, Tamil Nadu was stipulated to release at least 10 tmcft of water for maintaining minimum environmental flows downstream of Lower Coleroon Anicut and supply 7 tmcft to Puducherry in a normal water year. Kerala was allowed to use 21 tmcft from Kabini River basin, 6 tmcft from Bhavani River basin and 3 tmcft from Pambar River basin in a normal year. The award also let Karnataka and Tamil Nadu use all the excess water available in its area after the stipulated allocation during a normal year. Any water going waste to sea in excess of 4 tmcft (other than 10 tmcft minimum environmental flows) forms part of the utilisable water share of Tamil Nadu.

Based on the river basin water data available from the year 1934 to 1971, the tribunal had estimated the average water yield in the total river basin as 767 tmcft with 47% dependability. The water used in the Kaveri delta in Tamil Nadu and Puducherry was nearly 280 tmcft annually which is the tail end water use in the river basin and its regenerated water either goes to sea or outside the basin. In response to the petition filed by Tamil Nadu earlier, the Supreme Court on 10 May 2013 issued an interim direction to the union government to establish an interim supervisory committee to implement the tribunal order till the constitution of the Cauvery Management Board (CMB) as stated in the tribunal order. The union government issued the gazette notification on 22 May 2013 establishing the supervisory committee. As per the Interstate River Water Disputes Act, the committee has powers similar to an authority/board established by the Indian parliament.

==== 2016 ====
Karnataka later proposed a dam project at Mekedaatu, which led to Tamil Nadu raising objections to it. In August 2016, Tamil Nadu approached the Supreme Court, seeking direction to Karnataka to release 50.052 tmcft of water, which was pending as per the order of the CWBT. Karnataka had declined to release water and cited low reservoir levels. On 2 September, the Supreme Court asked Karnataka to consider Tamil Nadu's plea on humanitarian grounds and release water and advised both states to maintain harmony. On 5 September, Karnataka informed the Supreme Court that it can release 10,000 cusecs of water per day, while Tamil Nadu demanded 20,000 cusecs per day. The Supreme Court ordered Karnataka to release 15,000 cusecs per day to Tamil Nadu for the next ten days. However, violence erupted in Karnataka following a bandh called by pro-Kannada organisations, which resulted in wide spread arson, and rioting. The violence resulted in two deaths, and curfew was imposed in parts of Bengaluru.

On 12 September 2016, Karnataka cited the violence as a reason for its inability to release water before the Supreme Court. The Supreme Court modified the 5 September order, directing Karnataka to release 12,000 cusecs of water till 20 September 2016, and ordered the formation of a Cauvery Supervisory Committee within the next five days. On 19 September 2016, the committee ordered Karnataka to release 3,000 cusecs per day from 21 September 2016 to 30 September 2016. On 20 September 2016, the Supreme Court directed Karnataka to further release 6,000 cusecs of water from 21 September 2016 to 27 September 2016 and directed the union government to set up the Cauvery Management Board in order to provide a permanent solution for the dispute. However, in a special session of the Karnataka Legislative Assembly held on 23 September, a resolution was passed not to release water to Tamil Nadu, defying the Supreme Court's order. On 27 September, the Supreme Court passed a revised order to Karnataka to give 6000 cusecs of water to Tamil Nadu for three days, which was not honoured by Karnataka.

On 30 September, the Supreme Court gave Karnataka an ultimatum and ordered 6,000 cusecs of water to be released during the next six days. It asked the union government to set up the Cauvery Water Management Board (CWMB) by 4 October and report back on 6 October with assessment of water levels. On 1 October 2016, Karnataka filed for review petition against the order. After a special legislature session on 3 October, the Karnataka government decided to release water for agricultural purposes. On 4 October, the Supreme Court directed Karnataka to further release 2,000 cusecs of water daily to Tamil Nadu from 7 to 18 October.

==== 2018 ====
As instructed by the Supreme Court, the Cauvery Water Management Authority (CWMA) was created by the union government on 1 June 2018. The nine-member Cauvery Water Regulation Committee was created three weeks later. The Supreme Court on 9 January 2018 declared that it would pronounce its verdict clearing all the pending cases related to river water dispute within a month. On 16 February 2018, the Hon'ble Supreme Court pronounced its verdict, and allocated 404.25 tmcft to Tamil Nadu and 284.75 tmcft to Karnataka, while the allocations for the others remained the same. It also mandated the union government to formally constitute the Cauvery River Management Board (CRMB) within 40 days for implementing the CWDT award and its verdict. Headquartered in Delhi, the CWMA became the sole body to adjudicate the river water dispute, and to oversee the allocation. The authority was assisted in the discharge of its functions by regulatory committee consisting of senior judges of the Supreme Court.

=== 2020s ===
In August 2023, Tamil Nadu requested Karnataka to release 24,000 cusecs of water per day, citing the need to irrigate crops. However, Karnataka refused, citing water shortage. Protests erupted in Karnataka, with agitators demanding that Karnataka stop releasing more water, while farmers in Tamil Nadu protested against Karnataka, demanding the release of water. In September 2023, the CWMA directed Karnataka to release 5,000 cusecs of water per day for 15 days. Karnataka complied, but refused to release any further water after the period. Tamil Nadu filed a contempt petition against Karnataka in the Supreme Court, alleging that the state had violated the court's orders. The Supreme Court the state to approach the CWMA and asked the CWMA to submit a report on the situation. Later, the Karnataka government appealed against the CWMA decision to provide 3,000 cusecs of water per day, and said that it is open to discuss with Tamil Nadu to arrive at a mutually agreeable solution.The government has also said that it is willing to negotiate with Tamil Nadu to find a mutually agreeable solution.

On 20th November 2026, the Supreme Court denied an application filed by the Government of Tamil Nadu seeking it to direct Karnataka to release 3,500 cusecs of water per day for 15 days from the Kabini and Krishna Raja Sagara reservoirs, contending that Karnataka had failed to release 4.5 tmcft of water by 12 August, as directed by the Cauvery Water Management Authority on 30 July.

== Summary ==
Particulars	Tamil Nadu	Karnataka	Kerala	Puducherry	Total
Basin Area up to Lower Coleroon Anicut site (in km^{2})	44,016 (54%)	34,273 (42%)	2,866 (4%)	—N/a	81,155
Drought area in the basin (in km^{2})	12,790 (36.9%)	21,870 (63.1%)	—N/a	—N/a	34,660
Inflow from basin (in tmcft)	252 (32%)	425 (54%)	113 (14%)	—N/a	790
Share as per CWDT order (2007)	419 (58.2%)	270 (37.2%)	30 (4.1%)	7 (1.0%)	726
Share as per Supreme Court verdict (2018)	404.25 (55.7%)	284.75 (39.2%)	30 (4.1%)	7 (1.0%)	726

== See also ==
- Godavari Water Disputes Tribunal
- Krishna Water Disputes Tribunal
- Right to water
- Water law
- Water Resources in India
- Water right
