= Hanmanth Shinde =

Indian politician

Hanmanth Shinde (born 1968) is an Indian politician from Telangana state. He was a former three time Member of the Legislative Assembly from Jukkal Assembly constituency which is reserved for Scheduled Caste community in Kamareddy district. In 2009 he won, representing the Telugu Desam Party, and in 2014 and 2018 representing the Telangana Rashtra Samithi.

== Early life ==
Shinde is from Dangaon village, Jukkal mandal, Kamareddy district, Telangana state. He is the son of Hanmanth Madhappa. He completed his Bachelor of Engineering in 1988 at University College of Engineering, Osmania University, Hyderabad. He declared assets worth Rs.1 crore in 2018 and Rs.4 crore in 2023, in his affidavit to thee Election Commission of India.

== Career ==
Shinde won the Jukkal Assembly constituency in the 2018 Telangana Legislative Assembly election representing the Telangana Rashtra Samithi. He polled 77,584 votes and defeated his nearest rival, S. Gangaram of the Indian National Congress, by a margin of 35,625 votes. He started his political career with the Telugu Desam Party, and first became an MLA from Jukkal in the 2009 Andhra Pradesh Legislative Assembly election where he polled 72,971 votes and defeated his closest opponent, S. Savithri of the Indian National Congress, by a margin of 34,124 votes. He retained the Jukkal seat for the Telugu Desam Party winning in the 2014 Andhra Pradesh Legislative Assembly election, which were held concurrently for both Andhra Pradesh and Telangana after the bifurcation of the states. In 2014, he polled 72,901 votes and defeated his neares rival, S. Gangaram of the Indian National Congress, by a margin of 35,507 votes.

From 2016 to 2018, he worked as chairperson of the Committee on Welfare of Scheduled Castes in the Telangana Legislative Assembly.
