= Gampa Govardhan =

Indian politician and legislator

Member of the Telangana Legislative Assembly
- In office 2009–2023
- Constituency: Kamareddy, Telangana

Personal details
- Born: 5 February 1964 (age 62) Baswapur
- Party: Telangana Rashtra Samithi.
- Spouse: G Rani
- Children: G Shashank, G Sushma

Gampa Govardhan (born 5 February 1964) is an Indian politician and a legislator of Telangana Legislature. Born in Baswapoor village Bhiknoor mandal, Kamareddy district.

He belongs to Puragiri Kshatriya/Perika community. He won Kamareddy assembly constituency on Telugu Desam Party ticket in 1994, 2009 and Telangana Rashtra Samithi ticket in 2012, 2014 and 2018 opposite to Shabbir Ali.
