= Telangana Vaidya Vidhana Parishad =

Department of Health Medical & Family Welfare

Agency overview
- Formed: 2 June 2014
- Jurisdiction: Government of Telangana
- Headquarters: DM&HS Campus, Sultan Bazar, Hyderabad, Telangana
- Minister responsible: Damodar Raja Narasimha, Ministry of Medical & Health
- Agency executive: Sri Dr J Ajaya Kumar, Commissioner of Health & Family Welfare
- Website: http://vvp.telangana.gov.in/

Telangana Vaidya Vidhana Parishad (TGVVP) is one of the divisions of Health and Family Welfare Department of Telangana Government

It was separated from Andhra Pradesh Vaidya Vidhana Parishad, which was established by an act of legislation in 1986. TVVP formed effective 2 June 2014.

It exclusively deals with the middle level hospitals of bed strengths ranging from 30 to 350. The posting of the Doctors and the other staff in these hospitals will be carried through the TGVVP.

District Hospitals and Area Hospitals of the Telangana also falls under the category of TGVVP.

Under this 103 area level hospitals, 8 district level hospitals, 233 Ayurvedic and 260 Unani hospitals spread over state.
