= Jukkal =

Coordinates: 18°22′08″N 77°37′01″E

- Village
- Interactive map of Jukkal
- Country: India
- State: Telangana
- District: Kamareddy district

Government
  - Body: Mandal Headquarters
  - MLA: Sri Thota Laxmi Kantha Rao

Population (2011)
  - Total: 45,165

Languages
  - Official: Telugu
- Time zone: UTC+5:30 (IST)
- PIN: 503305
- Vehicle registration: TS
- Lok Sabha constituency: Zaheerabad
- Vidhan Sabha constituency: Jukkal
- Civic agency: Mandal Headquarters
- Website: telangana.gov.in

Jukkal is a Town in the Kamareddy revenue division of Kamareddy district in the Indian state of Telangana.

== Demographics ==
Telugu is the official language in Jukkal. Apart from Telugu, Marathi, Kannada and Urdu are also spoken by a minor section of population. Total population of Jukkal Mandal is 45,168 living in 8,250 houses, spread across total 43 villages and 22 panchayats. Males are 23,076 and females are 22,092.
