= Bhiknur =

Coordinates: 18°12′54″N 78°26′12″E

Bhiknoor
- Village
- Interactive map of Bhiknoor
- Country: India
- State: Telangana

Government
  - Body: Sarpanch

Languages
  - Official: Telugu
- Time zone: UTC+5:30 (IST)
- Postal code: 503101
- Vehicle registration: TS 16
- Website: telangana.gov.in

Bhiknur is a village and a Mandal in Kamareddy district in the state of Telangana in India.
