= Singur Dam =

Dam in Telangana, India

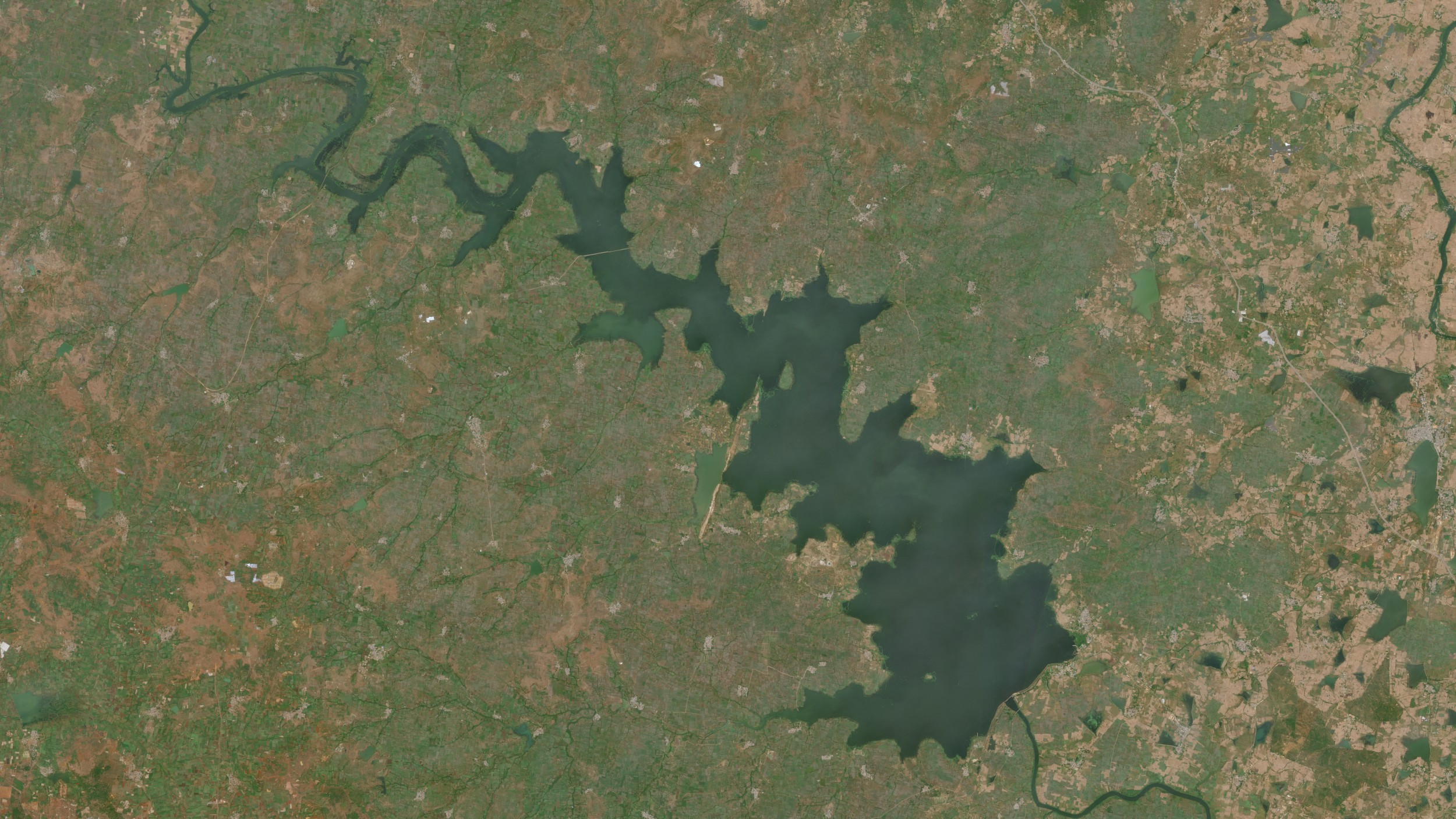
- Singur Lake Satellite image
- Interactive map of Singur Dam
- Official name: M BhagaReddy Singur Project
- Country: India
- Location: Sangareddy
- Coordinates: 17.7496°N 77.9278°E
- Construction began: in 1979
- Opening date: 1998; 28 years ago

Dam and spillways
- Type of dam: Earthen \ Gravity Dam
- Height (foundation): 33 m
- Length: 7,520 m (24,670 ft)
- Dam volume: 30 tmc ft

Reservoir
- Total capacity: 30 tmc ft
- Active capacity: 20 tmc ft

Singur Dam also written as Singoor (సింగూర్ in Telugu) is an irrigation, hydroelectric and drinking water project located in Singooru village near Sangareddy district in Telangana, India. It is a major source of drinking water for Hyderabad city.

The dam is built on the river Manjira. The construction was completed in 1998. Singur reservoir has live storage capacity of 29 Tmcft

It is a popular tourist destination.

This pipeline scheme is an inter river basin transfer link by feeding Godavari River water to Krishna River basin for Hyderabad city drinking water and subsequent regeneration/sewage flows generated (80%) for irrigation purpose. Nearly 10 tmcft water is supplied to Hyderabad city from this reservoir.

== History ==
It has history of series of delays since its inception. The irrigation component of this dam in Medak district is not yet implemented. In October 1999, 1 of 17 radial spillway gates failed on the Singur Dam in Andhra Pradesh, India. This failure occurred during initial filling of the reservoir when the water level was 9.8 feet (3.0 meters) below design level. The gate became dislodged due to a detachment of the left side trunnion girder. The right side arm supported the gate for 22 hours before becoming completely dislodged and washing away. The Andhra Pradesh State authorities attributed the failure of the gate to inadequate welding between the trunnion girder and the tie flats (Mande et al., 2000). There is no mention of downstream damage resulting from this failure.

Singur Dam Facts
| Dam Name | Singur dam |
| State Name | Telangana |
| Type of dam | Earthen / Gravity |
| Nearest City | Sangareddy |
| Impounds | Manjira River |
| Mandal | Pulkal |
| District Name | Sangareddy |
| Area | Information is not available |
| Lat / Long | 17.802194, 77.892981 |
| Total Capacity | 30 Tmc ft |
| Purpose | Irrigation, Hydroelectric and Drinking Water |
| Construction began | In 1979 |
| Opening date | In 1989 |
| Height | 33 meters |
| Length | 7520 meters |
| Spillway Gates | 17 |
| Spillway Discharge Capacity | 8.16 Lakh Cusecs |
| Type of Spillway Gates | Radial |
| Project | The Singur Project |

== See also ==
- Nizamsagar
- Sriram Sagar Project
