= Kamareddy district =

- District
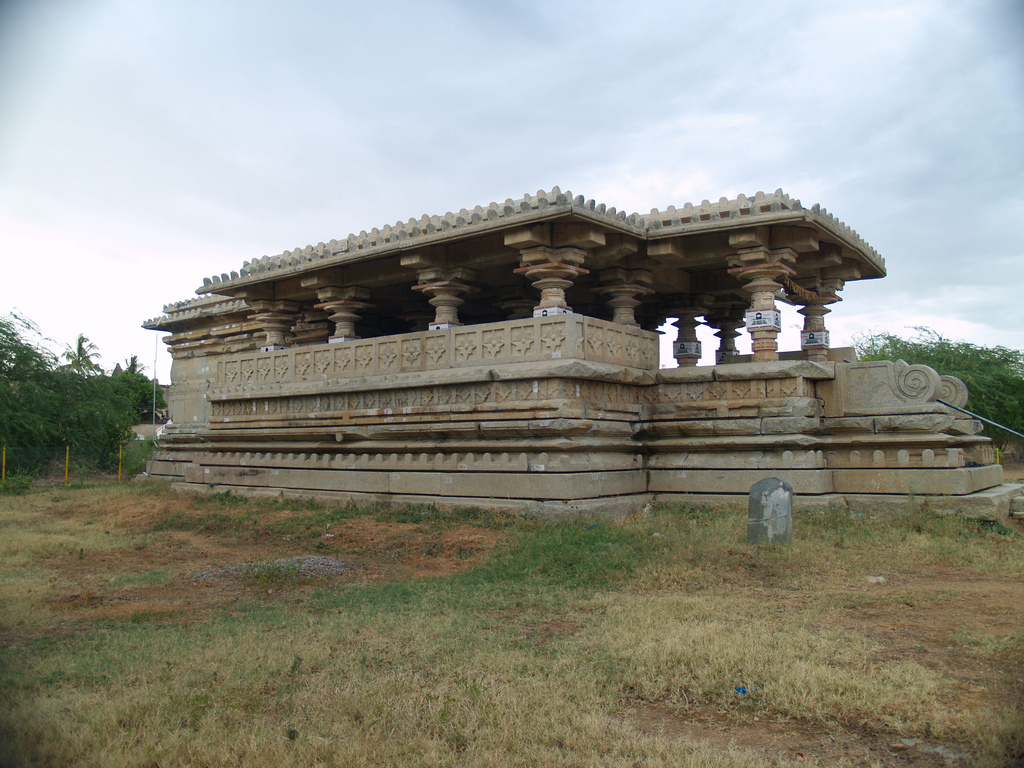
- Temple at Domakonda fort
- Interactive map of Kamareddy district
- Country: India
- State: Telangana
- Headquarters: Kamareddy
- Mandalas: 23

Government
  - District Collector: Shri Jithesh V Patil IAS

Area
  - Total: 3,652 km^{2} (1,410 sq mi)

Population (2015)
  - Total: 1,004,259
  - Density: 277.2/km^{2} (718/sq mi)

Demographics
  - Literacy: 56.51
  - Sex ratio: 1033
- Time zone: UTC+05:30 (IST)
- Vehicle registration: TG–17
- Website: kamareddy.telangana.gov.in

Kamareddy district is a district located in the western region of the Indian state of Telangana. The district shares boundaries with Medak, Nizamabad, Sangareddy, Siddipet and Rajanna Sircilla districts and with the state boundary of Maharashtra and Karnataka. Also it has 23 mandals under its administrative division. The district headquarters is Kamareddy.

== Geography ==
The district is spread over an area of 3,652.00 square kilometres (1,410.05 sq mi) making it the 15th largest district in the state. Kamareddy is bounded by Nizamabad district on North, Rajanna Sircilla and Siddipet districts to the east respectively, it is bounded on South by Sangareddy district and Medak district and on the West and South West by Nanded district and Bidar district of Maharashtra and Karnataka states respectively.

== Demographics ==
Religion in Kamareddy district (2011)
Hinduism	88.86%
Islam	10.22%
Christianity	0.43%
Other or not stated	0.49%
Religion

As of 2011 Census of India, the district has a population of 974,227. Kamareddy district has a sex ratio of 1033 females per 1000 males and a literacy rate of 56.48%. 111,966 (11.50%) was under 10 years of age. 123,622 (12.69%) lived in urban areas. Scheduled Castes and Scheduled Tribes made up 153,678 (15.77%) and 81,956 (8.41%) respectively.

Languages of Kamareddy district (2011)
1. Telugu (73.9%)
2. Urdu (9.73%)
3. Lambadi (7.57%)
4. Marathi (3.89%)
5. Kannada (3.23%)
6. Others (1.71%)

At the time of the 2011 census, 72.87% of the population spoke Telugu, 9.73% Urdu, 8.57% Lambadi, 3.89% Marathi and 3.23% Kannada as their first language.

== Administrative divisions ==
The district has three revenue divisions of Kamareddy and Banswada and Yellareddy are sub-divided into 23 mandals. Dr. A. Sharath is the present collector of the district. village Babulgaon formerly under Sangareddy district was restored to Kamareddy district.

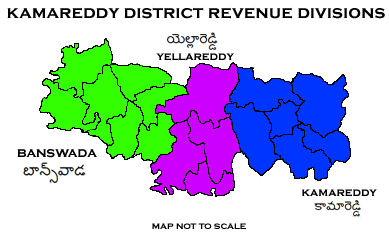
Kamareddy District Revenue divisions

Mandals in Kamareddy district
No.	Kamareddy	Banswada	Yellareddy
1	Kamareddy	Banswada	Yellareddy
2	Bhiknoor	Birkur	Nagireddypet
3	Tadwai	Nasrullabad	Lingampet
4	Rajampet	Bichkunda	Gandhari
5	Domakonda	Jukkal	
6	Bibipet	Pitlam	
7	Machareddy	Pedda Kodapgal	
8	Sadashivnagar	Madnoor	
9	Ramareddy	Nizamsagar	
10	Palvancha		

== See also ==
- List of districts in Telangana
