= Kamareddy =

- Town
- Kamareddy (Telangana) Kamareddy (India)
- Coordinates: 18.320500°N 78.337000°E
- Country: India
- State: Telangana
- District: Kamareddy

Government
  - Type: Municipality
  - Body: Municipal Council
  - MLA: K. Venkata Ramana Reddy (Bharatiya Janata Party)

Area
  - Total: 14.10 km^{2} (5.44 sq mi)
- Elevation: 546 m (1,791 ft)

Population (2011)
  - Total: 80,519
  - Density: 5,711/km^{2} (14,790/sq mi)

Languages
  - Official: Telugu
- Time zone: UTC+5:30 (IST)
- PIN: 503111 & 503112
- Telephone code: 08468
- Vehicle registration: TG 17
- Website: kamareddymunicipality.telangana.gov.in

Kamareddy is a city and headquarters of the Kamareddy district in Telangana state in India. It is located about 117 kilometres (73 mi) north of the state capital Hyderabad, 56 kilometres (35 mi) from Nizamabad and 96 kilometres (60 mi) from Karimnagar.

== Geography ==
Kamareddy is located at 18.3167°N 78.3500°E. It covers an area of 14.11 km^{2}. It is 110 km northwards from the state capital Hyderabad and 55 km south from the erstwhile district headquarters of Nizamabad. After formation of Telangana state in 2014, Kamareddy became district headquarters.

== Demographics ==
According to 2011 census and the statistical information by the Government of Telangana, the population of the town stood at 80,379. Kamareddy had a population of 64,496. Males constitute 51% of the population and females 49%. Kamareddy has an average literacy rate of higher than 65%, male literacy is greater than 74%, and female literacy is more than 56%. In Kamareddy, 13% of the population is under 6 years of age.

== Language ==
Major language spoken in the town is Telugu, Urdu and Hindi.

== Government and politics ==
Kamareddy Municipality was constituted in 1987 and is classified as a second grade municipality with 33 election wards. The jurisdiction of the civic body is spread over an area of 14.10 km^{2} (5.44 mi^{2}). After Telangana's General elections surrounding villages merged in Kamareddy municipality. Adloor, Tekriyal, Lingapoor, Devunipally, Sarampally and Chinnamallareddy added to Kamareddy municipality. Since 2010, the mayor of the town was Kamireddy Max Reddy.

Kamareddy comes under the Zahirabad parliamentary constituency. The town shelters 17 notified slums with a population of 35,197 and 4,853 BPL households.

== Economy ==
Kamareddy's main source of income is Agriculture, most of the families here are dependent on agriculture.The crops produced in Kamareddy are paddy, sugar, jaggery, different vegetables, maize and turmeric. There are around 318 textile business centers. Telangana's biggest poultry farms are in Kamareddy's rural and urban areas. One of the major agriculture market yard is located in Kamareddy. Kamareddy is the major center for the surrounding towns and villages. Kamareddy has agriculture based industries like Gayathri Sugars and Several rice mills which produces large scale of food products like Sugar, Rice and many more.

Kamareddy has been seeing a rapid growth in real estate, shopping malls and residential apartments that are currently under construction. It is also prime location for all medical speciality and Superspeciality hospitals which give service to surrounding districts also. Well known doctors like late Dr Anjalreddy, late Dr Bhairaiah, late Dr Eswardas, Dr Dattaiah established hospitals since 50 years.

== Transport ==
Kamareddy has two bus stands, and a railway station with connectivity to most major cities in Telangana, Andhra Pradesh and Maharashtra. Kamareddy is connected to major highways like NH44 (Srinagar- Kanyakumari Highway) which is the longest highway in India. Kamareddy has many roads which is connected to all major cities in India. State Highway 11 (Telangana) passes through this town.

=== Rail ===
Kamareddy has a major railway line : Secunderabad-Manmad railway line. Kamareddy railway connects to major cities in India.
