= Water supply and sanitation in India =

Data
- Access to an at least basic water source: 98.7% (2018)
- Access to at least basic sanitation: 98.7% (2018): Safely managed sanitation: 97%; Basic sanitation: 99%; Limited sanitation: 7%; No access to sanitation (open defecation): 1%
- Share of collected wastewater treated: 27% (2003)
- Average urban water use (L/person/day): 126 (2006)
- Share of household metering: 55% in urban areas (1999)
- Annual investment in WSS: US$5 / capita (2012)

Institutions
- Decentralization to municipalities: Partial
- National water and sanitation company: No
- Water and sanitation regulator: No
- Responsibility for policy setting: State governments; Ministry of Housing and Urban Poverty Alleviation, Ministry of Urban Development and Ministry of Drinking Water and Sanitation at the central level
- Sector law: No
- No. of urban service providers: 3,255 (1991)
- No. of rural service providers: about 100,000

In 2018, 98.7% of Indians had access to the basic water and sanitation facilities. India faces challenges ranging from sourcing water for its megacities to its distribution network which is intermittent in rural areas with continuous distribution networks just beginning to emerge. Non-revenue water is a challenge.

The share of Indians with access to improved sources of water increased significantly from 72% in 1990 to 88% in 2008 and stood at 98.7% in 2018. However, many people still lack access to water and sewage infrastructure.

== Water supply ==
=== Cities ===
In 2005, none among 35 Indian cities with populations above one million distributed water more than a few hours per day, despite generally sufficient infrastructure. Due inadequate water pressure, people struggled collecting water even when available. Service benchmarking carried out 2006 across 28 cities found average supply duration around 3.3 hours daily, ranging from one hour every three days up 18 hours daily. A 2007 study showed that 20 cities recorded average supply duration only 4.3 hours daily. Longest duration reached 12 hours daily at Chandigarh, while lowest remained 0.3 hours at Rajkot. By 2015, 88% total population had access at least basic water, (Note: Term "at least basic water" introduced new, related previous term "improved water source". Under Indian norms, access improved water supply exists when at least 40 litres (8.8 imp gal; 11 US gal) per person daily safe drinking water available within 1.6 kilometres (0.99 mi) distance or 100 metres (330 ft) elevation difference, relaxed as per field conditions. One pump required per 250 persons.) reaching 96% urban and 85% rural areas. Thus, nearly 163 million people lacked access to clean water close to their homes.

In Delhi land usage for residential area varies widely from planned colonies to unplanned slums. Despite the large piped network, with some areas receiving intermittent water supply, there are large areas that lack coverage. Reliance on dubious private water vendors is costly. For example, in Delhi water trucks get water from illegal wells on the banks of the Yamuna River for ₹200 per cubic metre or ₹0.75 per US gallon ($2.6/m^{3} or 1 ¢/US gal).

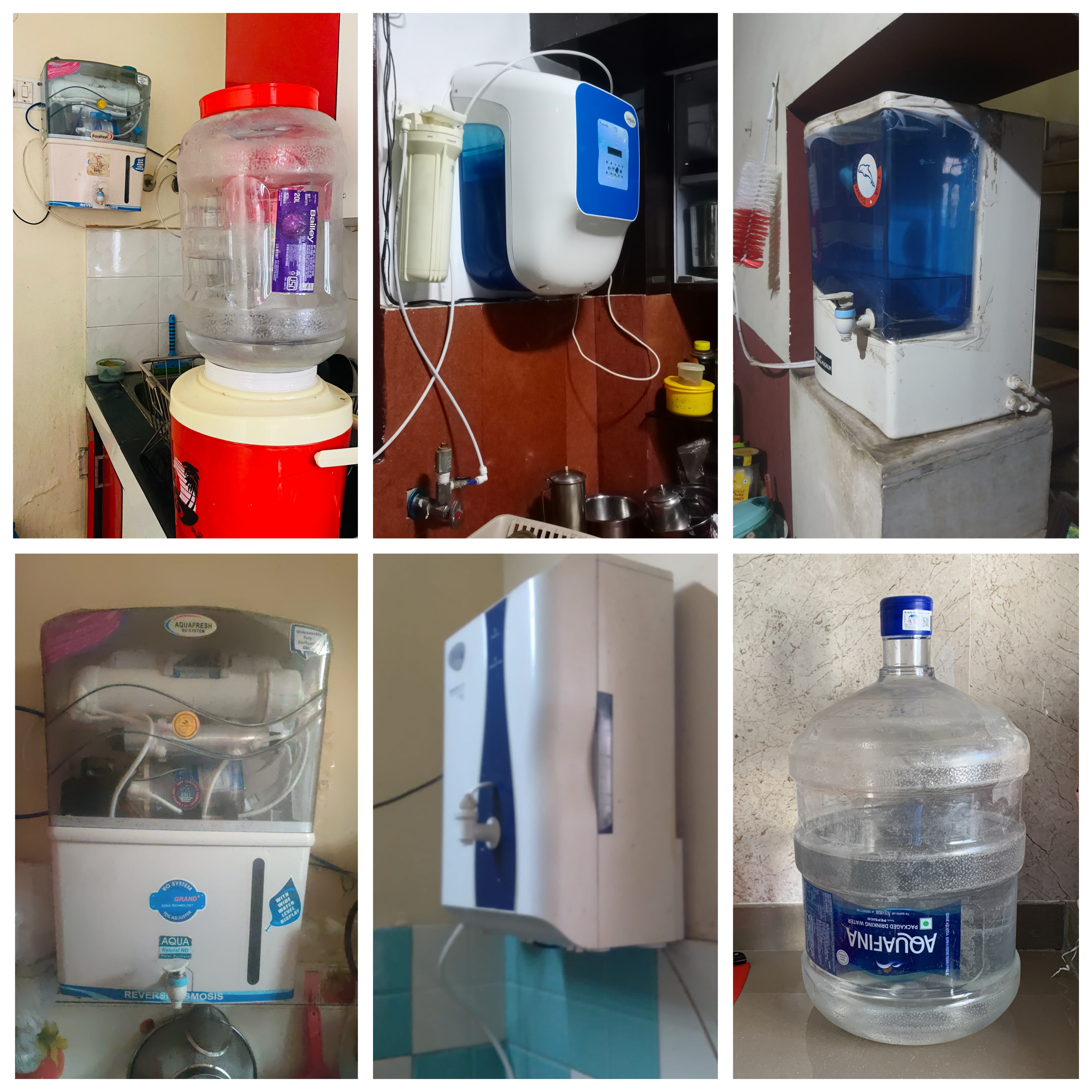
In India, Delhi has the highest usage of household water purifiers/filters. Basic gravity water filter, electric reverse osmosis and ultraviolet filters visible. Standard 20 L bottled water visible.

The supply of cities that depend on surface water is threatened by pollution, increasing water scarcity and conflicts among users. For example, Bangalore depends to a large extent on water pumped since 1974 from the Kaveri river, whose waters are disputed between the states of Karnataka and Tamil Nadu. As in other Indian cities, the response to water scarcity is to transfer more water over large distances at high costs. In the case of Bangalore, 500,000 cubic metres (18,000,000 cu ft) of water is pumped per day over a distance of 100 km (62 mi), thus increasing the city's supply by two-thirds.

Jamshedpur provided 25% of its residents with continuous water supply in 2009. In 2021, some parts of Mumbai got 24 hour supply, others got 19 hours supply or less. Puri became the first city in India to get a piped 24 hour continuous drinking water quality water supply. Trivandrum is the largest Indian city and the only million agglomeration that enjoys uninterrupted hygienic water supply. Chennai has two desalination plants: the Nemmeli and Minjur.

=== Towns ===
Malkapur is the first Indian town to provide 24/7 water supply with 100 per cent coverage. The programme started in 2008 as a pilot project and soon covered the entire city. The connection is 100 per cent metered with telescopic tariff.

=== Other water sources ===
==== Rainwater harvesting ====
In the early 21st century, India began heavily investing in rainwater harvesting infrastructure and policy as an urgent response to water scarcity. In 2001, Tamil Nadu became the first Indian state to make rainwater harvesting compulsory in every building to avoid groundwater depletion. In Rajasthan, rainwater harvesting has traditionally been practised by the people of the Thar Desert. Increase in rainwater harvesting efforts across the nation have revived ancient water harvesting systems in Rajasthan, such as the chauka system from the Jaipur district. Other large cities like Pune, Mumbai and Bangalore all have varying rules for mandatory rainwater harvesting, especially in new buildings. In 2002, the Municipal Corporation of Greater Mumbai required all new buildings over 1,000 square metres (11,000 sq ft) to have rainwater harvesting infrastructure. The law was expanded in 2007 to 300 square metres (3,200 sq ft). The goal was to ensure buildings had enough water to last them through non-monsoon seasons. The process included a catchment system, an initial flush, and extensive filtering. As of 2021, the Brihanmumbai Municipal Corporation (BMC) reported 3000 newly constructed or redeveloped buildings with rainwater harvesting infrastructure. However, many residents have complained that the stored water is contaminated, turning saline and brackish. Experts and residents argue that BMC authorities have done little to take implementation seriously, and the actual effectiveness of the rainwater harvesting mandate is unknown.

While rainwater harvesting in an urban context has gained traction in recent years, evidence points toward rainwater harvesting in rural India since ancient times. The type of system varied depending on the geography and culture of the region. Himachal Pradesh, for example, relied on kuhls, a community-owned rainwater irrigation system. Maharashtra predominately used bhandara phads, a check dam which lowers the velocity of flow from rivers and reduces erosion. On the onset of British rule in the early 19th century, many of these systems were abandoned. Environmentalists and scholars now believe that agricultural communities should revive ancient techniques to allow for rainwater harvesting to source the water needs of the community.

== Sanitation ==
This chart depicts the decrease in open defecation from 2000 to 2024 in countries sharing a land border with India. According to the WHO/UNICEF Joint Monitoring Programme (JMP), as reported by Our World in Data, the number of people practising open defecation fell from 73.2% to 6.7% from 2000 - 2024. About 157 million (15.7 crore), or approximately 11% of India's population, still practised open defecation in 2022.

A formal sanitation programme was first launched in 1954, followed by Central Rural Sanitation Programme in 1986, Total Sanitation Campaign (TSC) in 1999, Nirmal Bharat Abhiyan in 2012 and Swachh Bharat Mission in 2014. The growth of sanitation policy also reflected a broader shift in how water and sanitation were understood in India. Conditions that had often been treated as household or local matters came to be framed more clearly as public health and development concerns, especially in rural areas where infrastructure remained weak. Coming to light after the Total Sanitation Campaign in 1999, the link between rural sanitation and toilet coverage to national policy targets became very clear

In 2020, according to the World Bank data, 72% Indians, 68% Pakistanis, and 54% Bangladeshi have access to the basic sanitation facilities. In 2015, 44% had access to basic sanitation, or 65% in urban areas and 34% in rural areas. In 2017, at least basic sanitation increased to 59.5%. Between 2014 and 2019, the Government in India has built around 110 million toilets, all across India, due to which the basic sanitation coverage went up from 38.7% in October 2014 to 93.3% in 2019.

However, official coverage figures do not necessarily reflect the reliability or sustained use of services. In urban areas, many cities continue to receive water only for a few hours per day, while in rural areas access may exist on paper but remain uneven in practice because of irregular supply, weak maintenance, or limited long-term functionality. Studies of sanitation in rural India have also noted that toilet construction does not automatically eliminate open defecation, meaning that infrastructure growth and lived access do not always move at the same pace.

For years, most Indians depended on on-site sanitation facilities, mainly pit latrines in rural areas. The government has been investing heavily in building sanitation units, in a nation-wide campaign called the Swachh Bharat Mission. Between 2014 and 2020, the Indian government managed to make household toilets accessible to over 99% of the population. This translates to a total of 110 million toilets build since 2014, according to Statista. Preceding this success is the success of the Slum Sanitation Programme in Mumbai that has provided access to sanitation for a quarter million slum dwellers. Sewage, where available, is often in a bad state. In Delhi the sewage network has lacked maintenance over the years and overflow of raw sewage in open drains is common, due to blockage, settlements and inadequate pumping capacities. The capacity of the 17 existing wastewater treatment plants in Delhi is adequate to cater a daily production of waste water of less than 50% of the drinking water produced. Of the 892 million people in the world that defecate openly, some 15 million live in India, making it the country with the highest number of people who defecate in the open. This has serious public health implications.

For this reason, scholars and policy analysts have argued that the limits of sanitation policy in India cannot be understood through construction totals alone. They have pointed instead to uneven implementation, differences between regions, and the continued importance of local social conditions in shaping whether new facilities are used, maintained, and trusted. In this view, the central problem is not only expanding infrastructure, but ensuring that services remain usable and meaningful in everyday life.

A specific Indian problem is also the (officially prohibited) "manual scavenging" which is connected to the officially banned caste system, and relates to unsafe and undignified emptying of toilets and pits, as well as handling of raw, untreated human excreta.

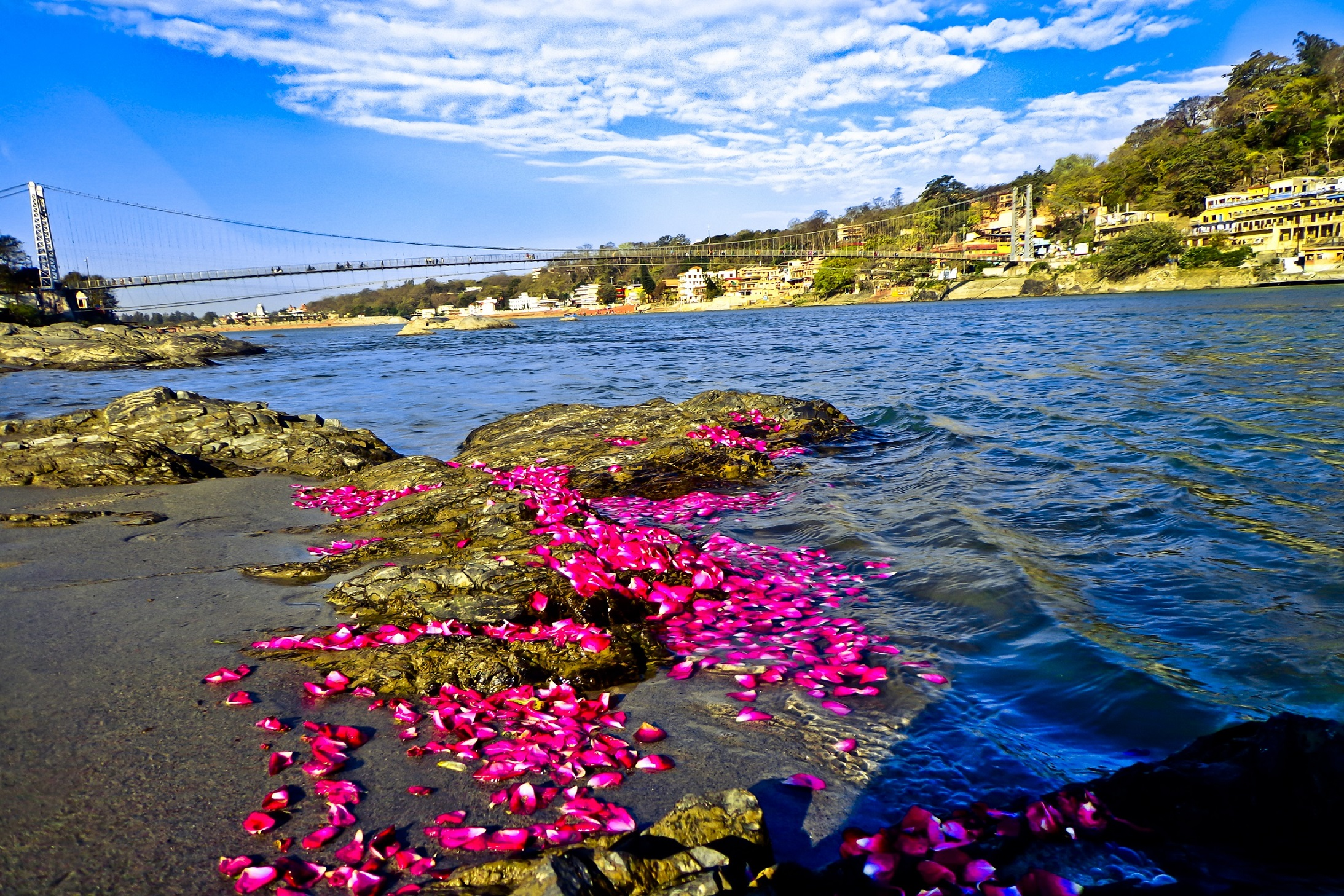
Millions depend on the Ganga river

As of 2003, it was estimated, that only 27% of India's wastewater was being treated, with the remainder flowing into rivers, canals, groundwater or the sea. For example, the sacred Ganges river is infested with diseases and in some places "the Ganges becomes black and septic. Corpses, of semi-cremated adults or enshrouded babies, drift slowly by." In 2008, NewsWeek described Delhi's sacred Yamuna River as "a putrid ribbon of black sludge" where the concentration of fecal bacteria is 10,000 times the recommended safe maximum despite a 15-year programme to address the problem. Cholera epidemics are not unknown.

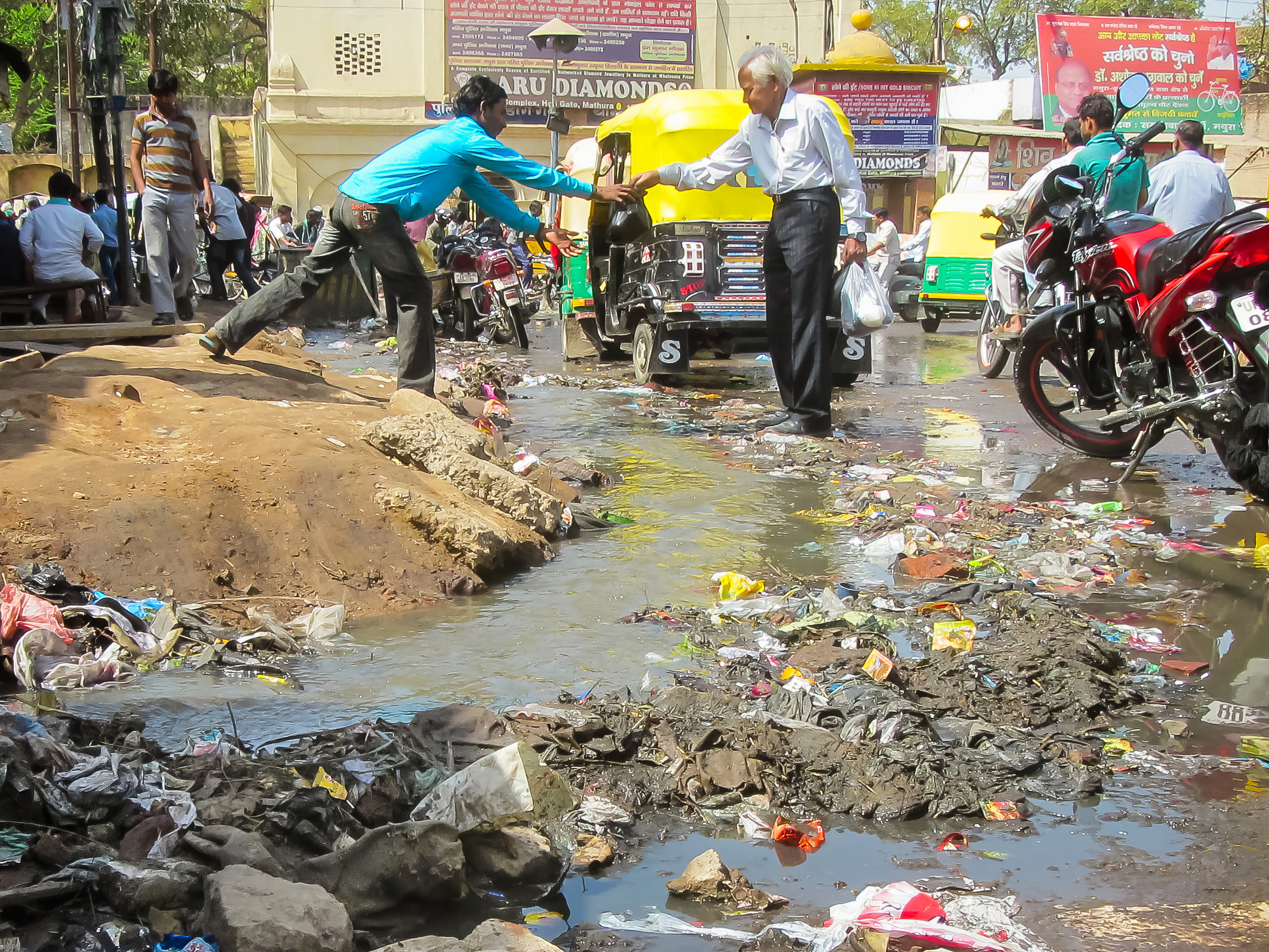
A street in Mathura overflowing with sewage and garbage in 2011

=== East Kolkata wetlands ===
In 2018, The Hindu reported that the East Kolkata wetlands, the world's largest biological sewage treatment facility, had been used to clean the sewage of Kolkata for several decades through the use of algae. This natural system, in use since the 1930s, was discovered by Dhrubajyoti Ghosh, an ecologist and municipal engineer in the 1970s, while he was working in the region. Ghosh worked for decades to protect the wetlands. It had been a practice in Kolkata, one of the five largest cities in India, for the municipal authorities to pump sewage into shallow ponds (bheris). Under the heat of the tropical sun, algae proliferated in these bheris, converting the sewage into clean water, which in turn was used by villagers to grow paddy and vegetables. This almost 100-year-old system treats 750 million litres of wastewater per day, providing livelihoods for 100,000 people in the vicinity. For his work, Ghosh was included in the UN Global 500 Roll of Honour in 1990 and received the Luc Hoffmann award in 2016.

== Health impact ==
The lack of adequate sanitation and safe water has significant negative health impacts including diarrhoea, referred to by travellers as the Delhi Belly (Travelers' diarrhea), and experienced by about 10 million visitors annually. The dismal working conditions of sewer workers are another concern. A survey of the working conditions of sewage workers in Delhi showed that most of them suffer from chronic diseases, respiratory problems, skin disorders, allergies, headaches and eye infections. Various other cities in India have a record of unsafe drinking water. Municipal water in Visakhapatnam is contaminated with too much chlorine and pharmaceuticals which cause headache, short-term memory loss and loss of focus.

== Responsibility for water supply and sanitation ==
According to the Indian Constitution, legislating regarding matters related to provision of drinking water supply and sanitation is responsibility of the State governments as it falls in the state list included in its seventh schedule. The 73rd and the 74th Amendment to the constitution required the state governments to devolve provision of drinking water and sanitation services to the Panchayati Raj Institutions (PRI) in rural areas or municipalities in urban areas, called Urban Local Bodies (ULB). At present, the arrangements for provision of these services vary. However, the transfer of responsibilities has not always implied a transfer of authority. In many states, technical approval, planning and financing continue to remain at higher administrative levels, while local bodies are expected to assume operation and maintenance responsibilities. Further, within states, different arrangements are also observed for rural and urban areas. For example, in urban and rural areas of Kerala, drinking water is supplied by the Kerala Water Authority a parastatal agency. In Maharashtra on the other hand, ULBs provide drinking water supply in most urban areas, but Maharashtra Jeevan Pradhikaran provides drinking water in most rural areas and a few urban areas as well.

Highly centralised decision-making and approvals at the state level, which are characteristic of the Indian civil service, affect the management of water supply and sanitation services. For example, according to the World Bank in the state of Punjab the process of approving designs is centralised with even minor technical approvals reaching the office of chief engineers. A majority of decisions are made in a very centralised manner at the headquarters. This has led to an uneven pattern of decentralisation across states. It has also contributed to the continuing debate over how decentralisation in the sector has changed decision-making in practice or redistributed the administrative responsibilities. In 1993 the Indian constitution and relevant state legislations were amended in order to decentralise certain responsibilities, including water supply and sanitation, to municipalities. Since the assignment of responsibilities to municipalities is a state responsibility, different states have followed different approaches. According to a Planning Commission report of 2003 there is a trend to decentralise capital investment to engineering departments at the district level and operation and maintenance to district and gram panchayat levels.

=== Policy and regulation ===
The responsibility for water supply and sanitation at the central and state level is shared by various Ministries. At the central level three Ministries have responsibilities in the sector: the Ministry of Drinking Water and Sanitation (until 2011 the Department of Drinking Water Supply in the Ministry of Rural Development) is responsible for rural water supply and sanitation; the Ministry of Housing and Urban Poverty Alleviation and the Ministry of Urban Development share the responsibility for urban water supply and sanitation. Except for the National Capital Territory of Delhi and other Union Territories, the central Ministries only have an advisory capacity and a limited role in funding. Sector policy thus is a prerogative of state governments.

National Urban Sanitation Policy. In November 2008 the government of India launched a national urban sanitation policy with the goal of creating what it calls "totally sanitised cities" that are open-defecation free, safely collect and treat all their wastewater, eliminate manual scavenging and collect and dispose solid waste safely. As of 2010, 12 states were in the process of elaborating or had completed state sanitation strategies on the basis of the policy. 120 cities are in the process of preparing city sanitation plans. Furthermore, 436 cities rated themselves in terms of their achievements and processes concerning sanitation in an effort supported by the Ministry of Urban Development with the assistance of several donors. About 40% of the cities were in the "red category" (in need of immediate remedial action), more than 50% were in the "black category" (needing considerable improvement) and only a handful of cities were in the "blue category" (recovering). Not a single city was included in the "green category" (healthy and clean city). The rating serves as a baseline to measure improvements in the future and to prioritise actions. The government intends to award a prize called Nirmal Shahar Puraskar to the best sanitation performers.

==== Wastewater treatment ====
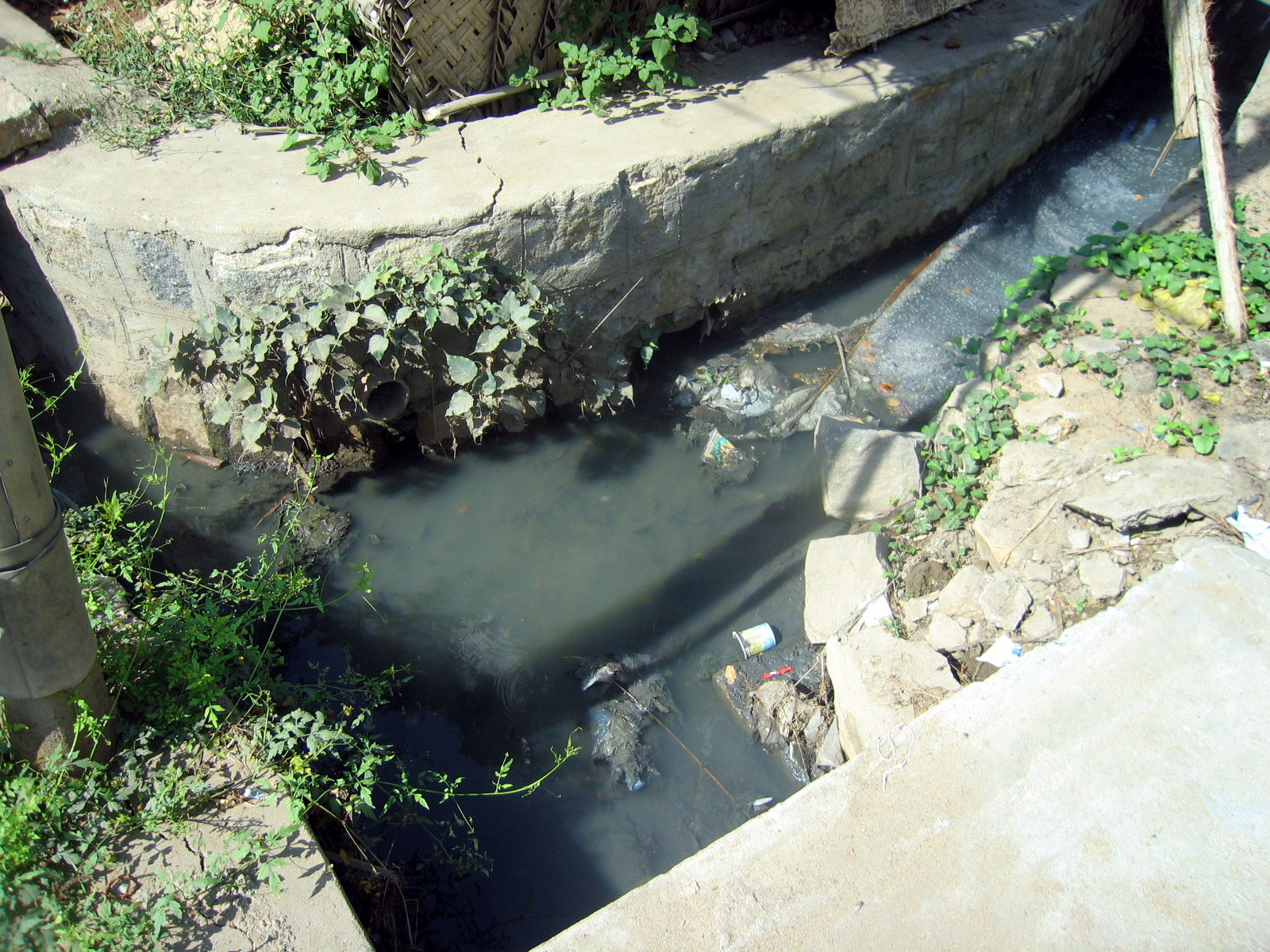
Picture of a wastewater stream

In India, wastewater treatment regulations come under three central institutions, the ministries of forest, climate change housing, urban affairs and water. The various water and sanitation policies such as the "National Environment Policy 2006" and "National Sanitation Policy 2008" also lay down wastewater treatment regulations. State governments and local municipalities hold responsibility for the disposal of sewage and construction and maintenance of "sewerage infrastructure". Their efforts are supported by schemes offered by the Government of India, such as the National River Conservation Plan, Jawaharlal Nehru National Urban Renewal Mission, National Lake Conservation Plan. Through the Ministry of Environment and Forest, India's government also has set up incentives that encourage industries to establish "common facilities" to undertake the treatment of wastewater.

Recent initiatives include the 'National Water Policy 2012' that promotes efficient use and water management, recycling and reuse of wastewater, water supply and sanitation, and efficient water pricing.

=== Service provision ===
Urban areas. Institutional arrangements for water supply and sanitation in Indian cities vary greatly. Typically, a state-level agency is in charge of planning and investment, while the local government (Urban Local Bodies) is in charge of operation and maintenance. Some of the largest cities have created municipal water and sanitation utilities that are legally and financially separated from the local government. However, these utilities remain weak in terms of financial capacity. In spite of decentralisation, ULBs remain dependent on capital subsidies from state governments. Tariffs are also set by state governments, which often even subsidise operating costs. Furthermore, when no separate utility exists, there is no separation of accounts for different activities within a municipality. Some states and cities have non-typical institutional arrangements. For example, in Rajasthan the sector is more centralised and the state government is also in charge of operation and maintenance, while in Mumbai the sector is more decentralised and local government is also in charge of planning and investment. In 2012 the Delhi Jal Board contracted out operations and management in three zones of the city to private companies under performance-based contracts to reduce non-revenue water. The Vasant Vihar-Mehrauli zone is operated by SMPL Infrastructure of India, Malviya Nagar by Suez Environnement and the Nangloi zone by Veolia Environnement.

Private sector participation. The private sector plays a limited, albeit recently increasing role in operating and maintaining urban water systems on behalf of ULBs. For example, the Jamshedpur Utilities & Services Company (Jusco), a subsidiary of Tata Steel, has a lease contract for Jamshedpur (Jharkhand), a management contract in Haldia (West Bengal), another contract in Mysore (Karnataka) and since 2007 a contract for the reduction of non-revenue water in parts of Bhopal (Madhya Pradhesh). The French water company Veolia won a management contract in three cities in Karnataka in 2005. In 2002 a consortium including Thames Water won a pilot contract covering 40,000 households to reduce non-revenue water in parts of Bangalore, funded by the Japan Bank for International Cooperation. The contract was scaled up in 2004. The Cypriot company Hydro-Comp, with two Indian companies, won a 10-year concession contract for the city of Latur City (Maharashtra) in 2007 and an operator-consultant contract in Madurai (Tamil Nadu). Furthermore, the private Indian infrastructure development company SPML is engaged in build-operate-transfer (BOT) projects, such as a bulk water supply project for Bhiwandi (Maharashtra). In 2023, NeeRain a government supported start-up was able to save 60,000 liters of water each year through innovation by installing their patented technologies across multiple location in India.

Rural areas. There are about a 100,000 rural water supply systems in India. At least in some states, responsibility for service provision is in the process of being partially transferred from State Water Boards and district governments to Panchayati Raj Institutions (PRI) at the block or village level (there were about 604 districts and 256,000 villages in India in 2002, according to Subdivisions of India. Blocks are an intermediate level between districts and villages). Where this transfer has been initiated, it seems to be more advanced for single-village water schemes than for more complex multi-village water schemes. Despite their professed role Panchayati Raj Institutions, play only a limited role in provision of rural water supply and sanitation as of 2006. Responsibility has been transferred, however, Panchayati Raj Institutions and user groups do not necessarily control technical design, financing or long-term priorities. As a result, participation in rural water supply has often remained limited to consultation or cost-sharing rather than decision-making authority. There has been limited success in implementing decentralisation, partly due to low priority by some state governments. Rural sanitation is typically provided by households themselves in the form of latrines.

== Innovative approaches ==
A number of innovative approaches to improve water supply and sanitation have been tested in India, in particular in the early 2000s. These include community-led total sanitation, demand-driven approaches in rural water supply, a public-private partnerships to improve the continuity of urban water supply in Karnataka, and the use of microcredits in water supply and sanitation to women in order to improve access to water.

=== Total Sanitation Campaign ===
In 1999 a demand-driven and people-centred sanitation programme was initiated under the name Total Sanitation Campaign (TSC) which has some similarities with community-led total sanitation (CLTS), but is not the same. It evolved from the limited achievements of the first structured programme for rural sanitation in India, the Central Rural Sanitation Programme, which had minimal community participation. The main goal of Total Sanitation Campaign is to eradicate the practice of open defecation by 2017. Community-led total sanitation is not focused on building infrastructure, but on preventing open defecation through self-awareness and shame. In Maharashtra where the programme started more than 2000 Gram Panchayats have achieved "open defecation free" status. Villages that achieve this status receive monetary rewards and high publicity under a programme called Nirmal Gram Puraskar.

A new sanitation campaign was launched as Swachh Bharat Abhiyan (Clean India Mission) in October 2014.

As of 1 December 2017, Total Sanitation Coverage throughout India has risen to 73% up from 42% on 2 October 2014, the day Swachh Bharat Abhiyan was launched.

=== Demand-driven approaches in rural water supply ===
Most rural water supply schemes in India use a centralised, supply-driven approach, i.e. a government institution designs a project and has it built with little community consultation and no capacity building for the community, often requiring no water fees to be paid for its subsequent operation. Since 2002 the Government of India has rolled out at the national level a programme to change the way in which water and sanitation services are supported rural areas. The programme, called Swajaldhara, decentralises service delivery responsibility to rural local governments and user groups. Under the new approach communities are being consulted and trained, and users agree up-front to pay a tariff that is set at a level sufficiently high to cover operation and maintenance costs. It also includes measures to promote sanitation and to improve hygiene behaviour. The national programme follows a pilot programme launched in 1999. The programme thus marked a shift away from the earlier supply-driven approach, under which projects were designed and implemented largely by government agencies. However, the extent to which this shift altered actual control over rural water supply has varied across states.

According to a 2008 World Bank study in 10 Indian states, Swajaldhara results in lower capital costs, lower administrative costs and better service quality compared to the supply-driven approach. In particular, the study found that the average full cost of supply-driven schemes is ₹38 per cubic metre or ₹1.1 per cubic foot (87 ¢/m^{3} or 2.5 ¢/cu ft), while it is only ₹26/m^{3} or ₹0.74/cu ft (60 ¢/m^{3} or 1.7 ¢/cu ft) for demand-driven schemes. These costs include capital, operation and maintenance costs, administrative costs and coping costs incurred by users of malfunctioning systems. Coping costs include travelling long distances to obtain water, standing in long queues, storing water and repairing failed systems. Among the surveyed systems that were built using supply-driven approach system breakdowns were common, the quantity and quality of water supply were less than foreseen in designs, and 30% of households did not get daily supply in summer. The poor functioning of one system sometimes leads to the construction of another system, so that about 30% of households surveyed were served by several systems. As of 2008 only about 10% of rural water schemes built in India used a demand-driven approach. Since water users have to pay lower or no tariffs under the supply-driven approach, this discourages them to opt for a demand-driven approach, even if the likelihood of the systems operating on a sustainable basis is higher under a demand-driven approach. The limited spread of demand-driven schemes also suggests that institutional reform in the sector has been uneven. Even where these approaches have been adopted, their success has depended on continued support from higher levels of government and the capacity of local institutions to manage systems over time.

=== Achieving continuous water supply in Karnataka ===
In the cities of Hubli, Belgaum and Gulbarga in the state of Karnataka, the private operator Veolia increased water supply from once every 2–15 days for 1–2 hours, to 24 hours per day for 180,000 people (12% of the population of the 3 cities) within 2 years (2006–2008). This was achieved by carefully selecting and ring-fencing demonstration zones (one in each city), renovating the distribution network, installing meters, introducing a well-functioning commercial system, and effective grass-roots social intermediation by an NGO, all without increasing the amount of bulk water supplied. The project, known by its acronym as KUWASIP (Karnataka Urban Water Sector Improvement Project), was supported by a US$39.5 million loan from the World Bank. It constitutes a milestone for India, where no large city so far has achieved continuous water supply. The project is expected to be scaled-up to cover the entire area of the three cities. Karnataka Urban Infrastructure Development & Finance Corporation (KUIDFC) has taken up North Karnataka Urban Sector Investment Programme (NKUSIP) covering 25 towns. Ilkal is one of the Project town, where 24 X 7 water supply project was implemented. The construction activities commenced in February 2013 and 24 X 7 water supply is commissioned in September 2015. The system is running successfully since then.

=== Microcredit for water connections in Tamil Nadu ===
In Tiruchirapalli in Tamil Nadu, the NGO Gramalaya, established in 1987, and women self-help groups promote access to water supply and sanitation by the poor through microcredit. Among the benefits are that women can spend more time with their children, earn additional income, and sell surplus water to neighbours. This money contributes to her repayment of the WaterCredit loan. The initiative is supported by the US-based non-profit Water Partners International.

=== Jamshedpur Utilities and Services Company ===
The Jamshedpur Utilities and Services Company (JUSCO) provides water and sanitation services in Jamshedpur. Until 2004 a division of Tata Steel provided water to the city's residents. However, service quality was poor with intermittent supply, high water losses and no metering. To improve this situation and to establish good practices that could be replicated in other Indian cities, JUSCO was set up as a wholly owned subsidiary of Tata Steel in 2004.

Efficiency and service quality improved substantially over the following years. The level on non-revenue water decreased from an estimated 36% in 2005 to 10% in 2009; one quarter of residents received continuous water supply (although the average supply remained at only 7 hours per day) in 2009; the share of metered connections increased from 2% in 2007 to 26% in 2009; the number of customers increased; and the company recovered its operating costs plus a portion of capital costs. Identifying and legalising illegal connections was an important element in the reduction of non-revenue water. The utility prides itself today of the good drinking water quality provided and encourages its customers to drink from the tap. The utility also operates a wastewater treatment plant that meets discharge standards. The private utility pays salaries that are higher than civil service salaries and conducts extensive training programmes for its staff. It has also installed a modern system to track and resolve customer complaints. Furthermore, it conducts independent annual customer satisfaction surveys. Together with Ranhill Malaysia it won a 25-year concession contract for providing the water supply in Haldia City, West Bengal.

=== Fecal sludge management ===
Many small and medium towns in India have started deploying fecal sludge management (FSM) for dealing with human excreta instead of waiting for sewerage systems. It deals with excreta contained in on-site sanitation systems like pits and septic tanks (called as fecal sludge). It involves removal of fecal sludge from on-site sanitation system its conveyance to a facility where it is treated. In sewerage systems, sizeable share of the capital expenditure is towards laying network. In deploying FSM, the waste is conveyed through vacuum emptier trucks or other vehicles using existing road network, thereby drastically reducing the capital expenditure. Already 30 towns have FSM services operational and they are at various stages of planning in 700 other towns across the country. It is rapidly being adopted in the states of Maharashtra, Rajasthan, Uttar Pradesh, Odisha, Andhra Pradesh, Telangana, and Tamil Nadu with support of members of the NFSSM Alliance.

== Efficiency of utilities ==
There are only limited data on the operating efficiency of utilities in India, and even fewer data on the efficiency of investments. Two indicators of operating efficiency are non-revenue water and labour productivity.

Non-revenue water. According to the results of a service level benchmarking (SLB) programme carried out by the Ministry of Urban Development (MoUD) in 2006 in 28 cities, the average level of non-revenue water (NRW) was 44 per cent. Another study of 20 cities by the Jawaharlal Nehru National Urban Renewal Mission with the support of the Asian Development Bank showed an average level of non-revenue water (NRW) of 32%. However, 5 out of the 20 cities did not provide any data. For those that provided data there probably is a large margin of error, since only 25% of connections are metered, which makes it very difficult to estimate non-revenue water. Also, three utilities in the sample show NRW levels of less than 20%, two of which have practically no metering, which indicates that the numbers are not reliable and actual values are likely to be higher. In Delhi, which was not included in the ADB study, non-revenue water stood at 53% and there were about 20 employees per 1000 connections. Furthermore, only 70% of revenue billed was actually collected.

Labour productivity. Concerning labour productivity, the 20 utilities in the sample had on average 7.4 employees per 1,000 connections, which is much higher than the estimated level for an efficient utility. A survey of a larger sample of Indian utilities showed an average ratio of 10.9 employees per 1,000 connections.

== Tariffs, cost recovery and subsidies ==
Water and sewer tariffs in India are low in both urban and rural areas. In urban areas they were set at the equivalent of about 10 ¢/m^{3} (0.28 ¢/cu ft) in 2007 and recovered about 60% of operating and maintenance costs, with large differences between cities. Some cities such as Kolkata do not bill residential users at all. In rural areas the level of cost recovery often is even lower than in urban areas and was estimated at only 20% in rural Punjab. Subsidies were estimated at US$1.1 billion per year in the mid-1990s, accounting to 4% of all government subsidies in India. 70% of those benefiting from the subsidies are not poor.

=== Urban areas ===
Metering. Water metering is the precondition for billing water users on the basis of volume consumed. Estimates of the share of customers metered vary depending on the study quoted. According to the results of a service level benchmarking (SLB) rogram carried out by the Ministry of Urban Development in 2006 in 28 cities, the share of metering was 50 per cent. According to a 1999 survey of 300 cities about 62% of urban water customers in metropolitan areas and 50% in smaller cities are metered (average 55%). However, meters often do not work so that many "metered" customers are charged flat rates. Bangalore and Pune are among the few Indian cities that meter all their customers. Many other cities have no metering at all or meter only commercial customers. Users of standposts receive water free of charge. A 2007 study of 20 cities by the Jawaharlal Nehru National Urban Renewal Mission with the support of the Asian Development Bank (ADB) showed that only 25% of customers of these utilities were metered. Most other customers paid a flat tariff independent of consumption. Some utilities, such as the one serving Kolkata, actually do not bill residential users at all.

Tariff levels. According to the same ADB study the average tariff for all customers – including industrial, commercial and public customers – is ₹4.9 per cubic metre or ₹0.14 per cubic foot (12 ¢/m^{3} or 0.34 ¢/cu ft). According to a 2007 global water tariff survey by the OECD the residential water tariff for a consumption of 15 m^{3} (530 cu ft) was equivalent to $0.15/m^{3} ($0.0042/cu ft) in Bangalore, $0.12/m^{3} ($0.0034/cu ft) in Calcutta, $0.11/m^{3} ($0.0031/cu ft) in New Delhi and $0.09/m^{3} ($0.0025/cu ft) in Mumbai. Only Bangalore had a sewer tariff of $0.02/m^{3} ($0.00057/cu ft). The other three cities did not charge for sewerage, although the better-off tend to be the ones with access to sewers.

Tariff structure. The tariff for customers that are effectively metered is typically a uniform linear tariff, although some cities apply increasing-block tariffs.

Affordability. Urban water tariffs were highly affordable according to data from the year 2000. A family of five living on the poverty line which uses 20 cubic metres (710 cu ft) of water per month would spend less than 1.2% of its budget on its water bill if it had a water meter. If it did not have a water meter and was charged a flat rate, it would pay 2.0% of its budget. This percentage lies below the often used affordability threshold of 5%. However, at that time the average metered tariff was estimated at only $0.03/m^{3} ($0.00085/cu ft), or less than three times what it was estimated to be in 2007. Apparently no more up-to-date estimates on the share of the average water bill in the budget of the poor are available.

Cost recovery. According to a 2007 study of 20 cities the average rate of cost recovery for operating and maintenance costs of utilities in these cities was 60%. Seven of the 20 utilities generated a cash surplus to partially finance investments. Chennai generated the highest relative surplus. The lowest cost recovery ratio was found in Indore in Madhya Pradesh, which recovered less than 20% of its operating and maintenance costs. According to the results of a service level benchmarking (SLB) programme carried out by the Ministry of Urban Development in 2006 in 28 cities, cost recovery was 67% on average.

Delhi example. Between 2011 and 2013 Delhi Jal Board (DJB) has increased its revenues by 50 per cent and reduced operating subsidies from the National Capital Territory of Delhi. It owes ₹350 billion (US$3.6 billion) in debt, but hopes that the debt will be converted into a grant. The utility focuses on improving its customer database, meter reading through hand-held devices, billing and bill collection under a new manager, Debashree Mukherjee, who took the helm of the utility in 2012. As of 2004, in Delhi revenues were just sufficient to cover about 60% of operating costs of DJB; maintenance was, as a result, minimal. In the past, the Delhi utility has relied heavily on government financial support for recurrent and capital expenditures in the magnitude of ₹3 billion (US$31.2 million) per year and ₹7 billion (US$72.7 million) respectively. Accounts receivable represent more than 12 months of billing, part of it being non-recoverable. The average tariff was estimated at US$0.074/m^{3} in 2001, compared to production costs of US$0.085/m^{3}, the latter probably being a very conservative estimate that does not take into account capital costs.

Challenges faced in attempting to increase tariffs. Even if users are willing to pay more for better services, political interests often prevent tariffs from being increased even to a small extent. An example is the city of Jabalpur where the central government and the state government financed a ₹130 million (US$1.3 million) water supply project from 2000–2004 to be operated by the Jabalpur Municipal Corporation, an entity that collected only less than half of its operational costs in revenues even before this major investment. Even so, the municipal corporation initially refused to increase tariffs. Only following pressure from the state government it reluctantly agreed to increase commercial tariffs, but not residential tariffs.

=== Rural areas ===
Cost recovery in rural areas is low and a majority of the rural water systems are defunct for lack of maintenance. Some state governments subsidise rural water systems, but funds are scarce and insufficient. In rural areas in Punjab, operation and maintenance cost recovery is only about 20%. On one hand, expenditures are high due to high salary levels, high power tariff and a high number of operating staff. On the other hand, revenue is paid only by the 10% of the households who have private connections. Those drawing water from public stand posts do not pay any water charges at all, although the official tariff for public stand post users is ₹15 (16¢ US) per month per household.

=== Subsidies and targeting of subsidies ===
There are no accurate recent estimates of the level of subsidies for water and sanitation in India. It has been estimated that transfers to the water sector in India amounted to ₹54,708 million (US$568.1 million) per year in the mid-1990s, accounting for 4% of all government subsidies in India. About 98% of this subsidy is said to come from State rather than Central budgets. This figure may only cover recurrent cost subsidies and not investment subsidies, which are even higher (see below). There is little targeting of subsidies. According to the World Bank, 70% of those benefiting from subsidies for public water supply are not poor, while 40% of the poor are excluded because they do not have access to public water services.

== Investment and financing ==
Investment in urban water supply and sanitation has increased during the first decade of the 21st century, not least thanks to increased central government grants made available under Jawaharlal Nehru National Urban Renewal Mission under the Congress government until 2014 and the Swachh Bharat Abhiyan (Clean India Mission) under the BJP government since 2014, alongside loans from the Housing and Urban Development Corporation.

=== Investment ===
The Eleventh Five-Year Plan (2007–2012) foresaw investments of ₹1,270.25 billion (US$13.2 billion) for urban water supply and sanitation, including urban (stormwater) drainage and solid waste management.

=== Financing ===
The funding of government programmes for water supply and sanitation is shared by the central government, states and other contributors, with the share contributed by various stakeholders varying between programmes and over time. For example, as of 2016 the states pay 60% and the central government pays 40% for investments financed under the Clean India Mission and the National Rural Drinking Water Programme. Until 2015 the central government had funded 75% of the Clean India Mission.

Under the 11th Plan (2007–12) 55% of the investments were to be financed by the central government, 28% by state governments, 8% by "institutional financing" such as HUDCO, 8% by external agencies and 1.5% by the private sector. Local governments were not expected to contribute to the investments. The volume of investments was expected to double to reach 0.7% of GDP. Also, it implied a shift in financing from state governments to the central government. During the 9th Plan only 24% of investments were financed by the central government and 76% by state governments. Central government financing was heavily focused on water supply in rural areas.

=== Institutions ===
The current system of financing water supply and sanitation is fragmented through a number of different national and state programmes. This results in simultaneous implementation with different and conflicting rules in neighbouring areas. For example, in rural areas different programmes undermine each other, adversely affecting demand driven approaches requiring cost sharing by users.

State budgets the major source of financing for water supply and sanitation. State Financing Corporations (SFC) play an important role in making recommendations regarding the allocation of state tax revenues between states and municipalities, criteria for grants, and measures to improve the financial position of municipalities. According to the Planning Commission, SFCs are in some cases not sufficiently transparent and/or competent, have high transactions costs, and their recommendations are sometimes not being implemented. An important source of financing are loans from Housing and Urban Development Corporation Ltd (HUDCO), a Central government financial undertaking. HUDCO loans to municipal corporations need to be guaranteed by state governments. HUDCO also on-lends loans from foreign aid, including Japanese aid, to states. The Jawaharlal Nehru National Urban Renewal Mission (2005–2014) played an important role in financing urban water supply and sanitation through central government grants. However, its grants were limited to the 35 largest cities in the country and 28 other selected cities, so that most cities with less than 1 million inhabitants were not eligible to receive grants from this mission. It was replaced by the Atal Mission for Rejuvenation and Urban Transformation (AMRUT), the new government's flagship programme for urban development.

In addition, in 2014 the new government announced its high-profile Swachh Bharat Abhiyan (Clean India Mission) that aims at eradicating open defecation by 2019, covering 4,041 cities and towns. The programme has received funding and technical support from the World Bank, corporations and state governments under the Sarva Shiksha Abhiyan and Rashtriya Madhyamik Shiksha Abhiyan schemes. Swachh Bharat Abhiyan is expected to cost over ₹620 billion (US$7.3 billion). An amount of ₹90 billion (US$1.1 billion) was allocated for the mission in 2016 Union budget of India. In 2015 the government introduced a 0.5% service tax on air travel, telephony, eating out and banking to finance the Clean India Campaign. A budget tracking study revealed that the shift of policy focus from water to sanitation as part of the Clean India Campaign has resulted in a cut in government spending on rural water supply. A Parliamentary Standing Committee report found that the government would be unable to achieve its 2017 target of providing 50% rural households with piped water.

During the 2019 Independence Day address, Prime Minister Narendra Modi confirmed that the target of providing piped water to half of the country's households had not been reached. He also announced that the Government had decided to promote the Jal Jeevan Mission with a starting endowment fund of Rs 3.5 trillion and the goal "to provide to all households in rural India safe and adequate water through individual household tap connections by 2024". The mission reflected a wider pattern of centrally announced welfare plans under the modi government, in which basic services were presented as direct benefits to individual households and monitored more closely from the central level. The Jal Jeevan Mission subsumed the older National Rural Drinking Water Programme (NRDWP), preserving the goal "to provide Functional Household Tap Connection (FHTC) to every rural household" by 2024. At the 107th Indian Science Congress held in January 2020 in Bengaluru, Modi declared that "technology is the strength of the Jal Jeevan Mission" and young Indian scientists have the "responsibility to develop cheap and effective technology for the recycling of water", which represents a new frontier for all of them.

The Jal Jeevan Mission marked a similar shift in rural water policy from broad access goals toward direct household service. While the programme expanded attention to piped water connections, later research has argued that connection counts alone do not capture whether service is reliable or sustainable. Questions of source conditions, service quality, village capacity, and long-term maintenance remain central to whether household tap connections provide durable access over time.

== External cooperation ==
In absolute terms India receives almost twice as much development assistance for water, sanitation and water resources management as any other country, according to data from the Organisation for Economic Co-operation and Development. India accounts for 13 per cent of commitments in global water aid for 2006–07, receiving an annual average of about US$830 million (€620 million), more than double the amount provided to China. India's biggest water and sanitation donor is Japan, which provided US$635 million, followed by the World Bank with US$130 million. The annual average for 2004–06, however, was about half as much at US$448 million, of which Japan provided US$293 million and the World Bank US$87 million. The Asian Development Bank and Germany are other important external partners in water supply and sanitation.

In 2003 the Indian government decided it would only accept bilateral aid from five countries (the United Kingdom, the United States, Russia, Germany and Japan). A further 22 bilateral donors were asked to channel aid through nongovernmental organisations, United Nations agencies or multilateral institutions such as the European Union, the Asian Development Bank or the World Bank.

=== Asian Development Bank ===
India has increased its loans from the Asian Development Bank (ADB) since 2005 after the introduction of new financing modalities, such as the multitranche financing facility (MFF) which features a framework agreement with the national government under which financing is provided in flexible tranches for subprojects that meet established selection criteria. In 2008 four MFFs for urban development investment programmes were under way in North Karnataka (US$862 million), Jammu and Kashmir (US$1,260 million), Rajasthan (US$450 million), and Uttarakhand (US$1,589 million). Included in these MFFs are major investments for the development of urban water supply and sanitation services.

=== Germany ===
Germany supports access to water and sanitation in India through financial cooperation by KfW development bank and technical cooperation by GIZ. Since the early 1990s both institutions have supported watershed management in rural Maharashtra, using a participatory approach first piloted by the Social Centre in Ahmednagar and that constituted a fundamental break with the previous top-down, technical approach to watershed management that had yielded little results. The involvement of women in decision-making is an essential part of the project. While the benefits are mostly in terms of increased agricultural production, the project also increases availability of water resources for rural water supply. In addition, GIZ actively supports the introduction of ecological sanitation concepts in India, including community toilets and decentralised wastewater systems for schools as well as small and medium enterprises. Many of these systems produce biogas from wastewater, provide fertiliser and irrigation water.

=== Israel ===
Israel is providing advanced water management technology and expertise to India.

=== Japan ===
As India's largest donor in the sector the Japan International Cooperation Agency (JICA) finances a multitude of projects with a focus on capital-intensive urban water supply and sanitation projects, often involving follow-up projects in the same locations. Projects approved between 2006 and 2009 cover parts of Assam, Kerala, the Hogenakkal Water Supply and Fluorosis Mitigation Project in Tamil Nadu, Goa, Agra, Punjab, Orissa, and Bangalore.

Evaluation of past projects. An ex-post evaluation of one large programme, the Urban Water Supply and Sanitation Improvement Programme, showed that "some 60%–70% of the goals were achieved" and that "results were moderate". The programme was implemented by the Housing and Urban Development Corporation from 1996 to 2003 in 26 cities. The evaluation says that "state government plans were not based on sufficient demand research, including the research for residents' willingness to pay for services", so that demand for connections was overestimated. Also fees (water tariffs) were rarely increased despite recommendations to increase them. The evaluation concludes that "HUDCO was not able to make significant contributions to the effectiveness, sustainability, or overall quality of individual projects. One of the reasons that not much attention was given to this problem is probably that there was little risk of default on the loans thanks to state government guarantees."

=== World Bank ===
The World Bank finances a number of projects in urban and rural areas that are fully or partly dedicated to water supply and sanitation. This includes support targeted towards the Ganga River Basin, municipal development in Andhra Pradesh, Karnataka, Tamil Nadu and in rural areas of Uttarakhand and Punjab. There are multiple projects and loans that go into hundreds of millions and billions of US dollars.

Evaluation of past projects. A study by the World Bank's independent evaluation department evaluated the impact of the World Bank-supported interventions in the provision of urban water supply and wastewater services in Mumbai between 1973 and 1990. It concluded that water supply and sewerage planning, construction and operations in Bombay posed daunting challenges to those who planned and implemented the investment programme. At the outset, there was a huge backlog of unmet demand because of underinvestment. Population and economic growth accelerated in the following decades and the proportion of the poor increased as did the slums which they occupied. The intended impacts of the programme have not been realised. Shortcomings include that "water is not safe to drink; water service, especially to the poor, is difficult to access and is provided at inconvenient hours of the day; industrial water needs are not fully met; sanitary facilities are too few in number and often unusable; and urban drains, creeks and coastal waters are polluted with sanitary and industrial wastes."

== See also ==
- Cleanest cities in India
- Climate of India
- Environment of India
- Kalpasar Project
- Interstate River Water Disputes Act
- List of drainage basins by area
- List of rivers of India by discharge
- List of rivers by discharge
- List of rivers by dissolved load
- List of dams and reservoirs in India
- List of water supply and sanitation by country
- National Water Policy
- Polavaram Project
- Pollution of the Ganges
- Sanitation worker
- Saemangeum Seawall
- Water scarcity in India
- Water pollution in India
