= Nadigar Sangam =

Trade union in India

South Indian Artistes' Association
- தென்னிந்திய நடிகர் சங்கம்
- Formation: 1952; 74 years ago
- Founder: M. G. Ramachandran; N. S. Krishnan; K. Subrahmanyam
- Headquarters: 17 Habibullah Road; Chennai 600017; Tamil Nadu, India
- Official language: Tamil
- President: M Nassar
- General Secretary: Vishal
- Vice President: Poochi S Murugan
- Vice President: Karunas
- Website: nadigar-sangam.org

The Nadigar Sangam (English: Actors' association), officially known as the South Indian Artistes' Association (Tamil: தென்னிந்திய நடிகர் சங்கம்), is a union for film, television, and stage actors in the Indian state of Tamil Nadu, based in Chennai. Formed in 1952, the group has a charitable trust fund to provide pensions to retired actors, voices support for actors caught in controversy, and has collectively protested socio-political issues.

Elections in the Nadigar Sangam, which is made up of over 3,000 members, are held every three years to determine the president of the union. R. Sarathkumar, who had been elected unopposed three times since 2006 when former president Vijayakanth stepped down, was ousted by Nassar in an election on 18 October 2015. The election held in 2019 was under the scrutiny of the court and a special officer appointed by the government looked into the administrative roles of the association.

== History ==
=== Formation and early history ===
Film director K. Subrahmanyam, who had helped Sri Sathyamurthy start the South Indian Film Chamber of Commerce, was approached by actors R. M. Somasundaram, T. N. Sivathanu, N. N. Kannappa and Sattampillai Venkatraman to create a representative organization in Tamil Nadu for professional actors from South Indian cinema, since many filming studios of Telugu, Malayalam, and Kannada cinema industries were also based in Madras (now Chennai) at the time. Subsequently, in August 1952, they launched the Junior Actors Association (Thunai Nadigar Sangam) for junior artistes. Thereafter, M. G. Ramachandran expressed his desire to join this group and insisted that there should be no difference amongst actors on the basis of seniority, and hence, it came to be called the Nadigar Sangam. As films from all the four southern languages were shot in Madras during that period, it was later renamed Thenn Indhiya Nadigar Sangam (South Indian Artistes Association). On 15 November 1952, it was registered as a society with rules and bylaws in place. K. Subrahmanyam and MGR donated money to help run this association, and began recruiting members. The founder-president was T. V. Sundaram, while the vice-presidents were MGR, S. D. Subbulakshmi, S. D. Sundaram and K. Vembu. The secretaries were T. N. Sivathanu and R. M. Somasundaram, while R. S. Manohar was appointed as the treasurer. The first member on its rolls, as of 1955, was N. N. Kannappa, and the next was M. R. Santhanam. In November 1955, a magazine, Nadigan Kural (The Voice of the Artiste) was started by MGR, who served as its first editor.

Over the following years, the society began to function and in February 1954, the first elections were held. The Sanga, organized railway concessions for drama artistes and paved the way for the introduction of bus services to the Kodambakkam studios, through the bus, 12B (Santhome to Kodambakkam) in 1955. A fund-raiser for cyclone relief was organized in December 1955 and at the event, plays and light music performances were organized.

The team purchased over 2,000 square feet (190 m^{2}) of land on Habibulla Road in T Nagar, an affluent neighborhood in Madras (now Chennai). Upon Ramachandran's appointment as Chief Minister of Tamil Nadu in 1977, he approved the Nadigar Sangam's construction of a new building, comprising a preview theatre, a gym and an office space. Subsequently, upon opening of the Sankardas Swamigal auditorium, Sivaji Ganesan became its president and Major Sunderrajan, its secretary. By generating income through the building, Sivaji administered regular payment to poor artistes in the organization.

On 5 May 1987, a public charitable trust called the Nadigar Sangam Charitable Trust was registered, with founders of the trust being R. S. Manohar, N. S. Krishnan, and Radha Ravi. The trust was established to provide educational, medical and other forms of monetary assistance to needy members of the Nadigar Sangam.

=== Debt, fundraising events and protests ===
During the late 1990s, pressure began to grow on incumbent leader Radharavi after allegations of financial wrongdoing. In October 1997, the film industry had a protest against the leadership.

Vijayakanth was elected unopposed as the President of the Nadigar Sangam in August 2000, while R. Sarathkumar was appointed as the General Secretary. Although members had called for a new committee to replace the existing group, several experienced members stayed on in roles. Vijayakanth's initial task was to clear up debt totalling over ₹2 crore. Soon after gaining power, the group's leaders met Tamil Nadu's Chief Minister M. Karunanidhi, and later asked their members not to work on films which may hurt the feelings of politicians, citing Iruvar (1997) and Desiya Geetham (1998) as examples. The remark was widely criticised for restricting freedom of expression.

Vijayakanth retained presidency of the Nadigar Sangam after defeating Devi by 972 to 124 votes in December 2002. Sarathkumar continued as the General Secretary, while Napolean, Radharavi and S. S. Chandran were made Vice Presidents. Vijayakanth organized "Star Night" stage shows in Malaysia and Singapore to fundraise for the Nadigar Sangam's accumulated debt, which was at approximately ₹4.5 crore. Later on in the year, the Sangam staged a 5000 people-strong an anti-Karnataka demonstration in Neyveli, demanding stoppage of power supply to that state, as a result of the Kaveri River water dispute. Again in 2004, shows were done in Dubai and Abu Dhabi for fundraising.

Following the launch of his political party Desiya Murpokku Dravida Kazhagam, Vijayakanth opted to step down as the President of the Nadigar Sangam and called for elections. Both Sarathkumar and Napolean were expected to run for presidency, but following his loss at the 2006 state elections, the latter pulled out. Prabhu and Nassar had also considered running for the presidential post, but opted against doing so. Eventually, Sarathkumar was elected unopposed, while Radharavi was elected as General Secretary and Manorama and Vijayakumar as vice-presidents.

In May 2008, the group organized a one-day hunger strike opposing the Karnataka government's controversial plan of the Hogenakkal Integrated Drinking Water Project and the abuse of Tamils in the state of Karnataka. In September 2008, Sarathkumar called for a one-day hunger strike, protesting the deaths of several Tamils in Sri Lanka and the ongoing Sri Lankan Civil War. It was among the first of a series of protests against the Sri Lankan Civil War that occurred the following year across the world. Sarathkumar was elected unopposed in June 2009, with Vagai Chandrasekhar joining the incumbent team as a treasurer. On 7 October 2009, the Nadigar Sangam launched a rally against the Tamil Nadu-based newspaper Dina Malar for publishing a news article claiming Indian pornographic actress Bhuvaneshwari had alleged several Tamil actresses involved in illegal sex-work. The actresses listed in the article were Namitha, Seetha, Nalini, Anju, Shakeela, Manjula Vijayakumar and Sripriya. General secretary Radha Ravi filed a defamation complaint to Chennai Police, resulting in the arrest of the newspaper's editor B. Lenin. Journalists, including The Hindu editor N. Ram, condemned Lenin's arrest as only being done to appease film stars and demanded his release. Lenin was later released on bail. In 2010, Sarathkumar and his wife Radhika, who were respectively the star and co-producer of the film Jaggubhai, held a press conference condemning the act of giving films unauthorized distribution on the Internet, after it was discovered that an unedited full-length version of the film had been uploaded online.

=== Building controversy and 2015 election ===
In 2010, the Nadigar Sangam announced the idea to demolish its existing building in T. Nagar, Chennai and construct a new one. On 6 August 2010, Radha Ravi allowed a long-term lease of the land, which was approximately 18 grounds and worth ₹150 crore at the time, to R. Sarathkumar. A 29-year, 11-month land lease agreement was signed by Sarathkumar on 25 November 2010 to Sathyam Cinemas (now known as SPI Cinemas), who planned commercial developments, including a multiplex and office space. Demolition of the building began in March 2011. Sarathkumar was elected unopposed for a third consecutive term in June 2012. Radharavi, Vijayakumar and Vagai Chandrasekhar continued as General Secretary, Vice President and Treasurer respectively, while K. N. Kaalai replaced Manorama as a vice president. On 30 November 2012, a case was filed at the Madras High Court by film actor Poochi Murugan and P. A. Kaja Mohideen against Sarathkumar and Ravi to stop the land lease to SPI Cinemas. Murugan alleged that the initial leasing of land by Ravi was done illegally and unilaterally without consulting the nine-member board of trustees or seeking approval from the rest of the association before deciding to lease. Murugan also claimed that the land rent set for SPI Cinemas was far less than market value and alleged that both Sarathkumar and Ravi were involved in a conflict of interest due to the fact that the two were brothers-in-law, accusing them of trying to take full control of the trust.

In 2013, a few members including Vishal and Nassar questioned the intent behind demolishing the building and leasing the land to a private company. Sarathkumar justified his acts claiming that leasing the land would generate income for the association, which would be used to assist members in need. Vishal insisted that the lease to SPI Cinemas be cancelled and that the association should construct its own building. Comedy actor Kumarimuthu was expelled from the Nadigar Sangam over allegations of speaking negatively about the association, after he questioned the intent behind the land lease and building demolition. In November 2014, Vishal submitted a complaint against Radha Ravi and Kaalai, who both remarked that anyone speaking out against Sarathkumar are dogs. Vishal alleged that leasing the land to construct a multiplex was money-motivated. Sarathkumar later accused Vishal of stating negative remarks about the Nadigar Sangam and that the association "will take action against him and he may also be removed from the Nadigar Sangam" which Vishal later denied and stated, "Questioning why the construction of the building hasn't started yet is not wrong according to me, and I will continue to do that. I just want all younger actors to join this good cause, and that too, I had clearly said, 'under the leadership of Sarathkumar only'." In June 2015, Vishal announced his intention to contest in the upcoming elections with a team against Sarathkumar if the lease agreement to SPI Cinemas was not retracted.

Sarathkumar was backed by Radha Ravi, who was seeking another term for secretary. Along with the two were S. S. R. Kannan who contested for treasurer, while Silambarasan and Vijayakumar ran for vice presidents. Their opposition, collectively named the Pandavar team after the Pandava from the Mahabharata, was led by Vishal running for secretary, Nassar running for president, Karthi running for treasurer, and both Karunas and Ponvannan running for vice presidents. Originally set for 15 June 2015, the election was issued an interim stay by the Madras High Court and pushed to 18 October 2015 after members of the Pandavar team requested that the election venue should be held at a private location with a former chief of justice observing the election process. Between June and October 2015, both teams campaigned vehemently against each other across Tamil Nadu and encouraged actors to vote. While both teams vowed to commence the construction of the new building, Sarathkumar promised increased pension from the state government, houses for those with over 20 year memberships, and workshops for aspiring actors. Vishal and the Pandavar team advocated for change in administration and democracy in the association. Their campaigns eventually came to be noted in the media as a battle between older generation actors (referring to Sarathkumar's team) and younger generation actors (referring to the Pandavar team), although both teams had supporters of all age groups. Actors Sivakumar, Khushbu, Prakash Raj, Kamal Haasan, Vadivelu, Sathyaraj, and Jayam Ravi openly expressed their support to the Pandavar team while Cheran, S. J. Suryah, S. Thanu, Shaam, Mumtaj, and Varalaxmi Sarathkumar were among the group of actors supporting Sarathkumar. Silambarasan labelled Vishal as "someone new coming in and breaking the film fraternity." Following Haasan's support to the Pandavar team, Sarathkumar accused him of being ungrateful after he had helped Haasan during the release controversy of Uttama Villain (2015). During a campaign speech on 17 October 2015, Sarathkumar mocked Haasan and berated Sivakumar, which led to negative criticism of Sarathkumar over social media.

The election took place at St. Ebbas Girls' Higher Secondary School in Mylapore, Chennai on 18 October 2015 peacefully amid a strong police presence, despite a brief altercation between Vishal and Sarathkumar. Eventually, the five contestants of the Pandavar team were victorious. Vishal was victorious for the General Secretary position over Radha Ravi by 307 votes, while Nassar beat Sarathkumar to become president by 113 votes.

== Administrative teams ==
Years	President	Committee	Ref.
1952	T. V. Sundaram Iyengar	M. G. Ramachandran, S. D. Subbulakshmi, S. D. Sundaram, K. Vembu, T. N. Sivathanu, R. M. Somasundaram, R. S. Manohar	
1956	V. Nagayya		
1957	N. S. Krishnan		
1957	M. G. Ramachandran		
1959	Anjali Devi		
1960	R. Nagendra Rao		
1961	M. G. Ramachandran		
1963–1966	S. S. Rajendran		
1967	M. V. Swaminathan		
1967–1971	K. R. Ramasamy		
1971–1977	Sivaji Ganesan		
1977	V. K. Ramasamy	Sivaji Ganesan, Major Sundarrajan	
1977–1985	Sivaji Ganesan	Major Sundarrajan	
1985–2000	Radharavi		
2000–2006	Vijayakanth	R. Sarathkumar, Radharavi, Napolean, S. S. Chandran	
2006–2015	R. Sarathkumar	Vijayakumar, Manorama, Radharavi, Vagai Chandrasekhar, K. N. Kaalai	
2015–incumbent	Nassar	Vishal, Karthi, Ponvannan, Karunas	

== See also ==
- Film Employees Federation of South India
- Tamil Film Producers Council
