= Hogenakkal =

Hogenakkal may refer to:

- Hogenakkal (village), a village in Tamil Nadu
- Hogenakkal Falls, a waterfall on the Cauvery river in Tamil Nadu.
- Hogenakkal Integrated Drinking Water Project
- Hogenakkal Falls water dispute
