= Tamil Nadu Water Supply and Drainage Board =

Public agency serving Tamil Nadu, India

- Type: Government of Tamil Nadu
- Industry: Water Supply, Sewerage
- Founded: Apr, 14, 1971
- Headquarters: TWAD House, No-31, Kamarajar Salai, Chepauk, Chennai - 600 005.
- Area served: Tamil Nadu, India (Except Chennai)
- Website: https://www.twadboard.tn.gov.in/

Tamil Nadu Water Supply and Drainage Board (TWAD Board) is a public agency formed by the Government of Tamil Nadu, under the Municipal Administration and Water Supply Department, assigned with the task of implementing all water supply and sewerage schemes to the state of Tamil Nadu (except the Chennai Metropolitan Area).

TWAD Board coordinates with the Government of India's Ministry of Rural Development and Departments of Drinking Water Supply, Ministry of Water Resources, National River Conservation Directorate, Rajiv Gandhi National Drinking Water Mission, Central Ground Water Board, Non Government Organisations (NGOs), academic institutions, etc., to implement the water supply and sewerage schemes in Tamilnadu.

== History ==
The local bodies were entrusted with the task of providing the amenities of water supply and drainage schemes initially. Then arose the necessity for an organisation of fully trained and experienced personnel on the Government side for the execution and maintenance of water supply and drainage schemes at satisfactory standards and minimum cost.

Hence the Sanitary Engineering Branch of the Madras Public Works Department was entrusted with the task of the investigation, design, execution and maintenance of the water supply and drainage schemes of all the local bodies in the state.

In the year 1962, the Sanitary Engineers circle and the Public Health Execution Circle were brought under the control of a separate Public Health Engineering and Municipal Works Department.

In the year 1966, the Public Health Engineering Department was reorganised on a territorial basis, with a view to cope with the increased work load and to ensure speedy execution of the schemes, when a number of water supply and drainage schemes were taken up.

Accordingly two Public Health Engineering circles were formed at Madras and Madurai, headed by separate Superintending Engineers, with exclusive jurisdiction to investigate, design, execute and maintain all urban water supply and drainage schemes.

The Government of Tamil Nadu constituted, the Tamilnadu Water Supply and Drainage (TWAD) Board as a non-statutory body during 1969. Statutory status was given to the Board with effect from 14.4.1971 by an enactment passed by the Tamil Nadu State Legislature.

== Functions ==
TWAD Board undertakes investigation, execution and maintenance of any scheme for the provision of watersupply and sewerage facilities, to meet the needs of any industries or institutions within the area of the local authority on the direction of state Government.

The watersupply and sewerage schemes undertaken by TWAD Board are handed over to the respective local bodies for maintenance on completion. However schemes of composite nature covering more than one local body are maintained by TWAD Board.

== Funding Agencies ==
- Govt of India, under JnNURM, UIDSSMT AMRUT, IUDM
- Govt of Tamil Nadu under Minimum Needs Programme
- World Bank aided through TNUDP III
- KfW (German Bank aid)
- JICA (Japan aid).

== Structure ==
The headquarters at Chennai co-ordinates with all the regional offices and government agencies for effective implementation of various watersupply and sewerage projects through the following units :

- Project Development Cell (PDC)
- Contract Management (CoM) Wing
- Project Management (PM) Wing
- Mega Project Monitoring wing
- Operation & Management (O&M)
- Research, Development, Training & PMC (RDT & PMC) Wing
- Communication and Capacity Development (CCDU) Unit

Region	Headquarters	Districts Covered	Circles	No. of Divisions
Coimbatore Region	Coimbatore	Coimbatore, Nilgiris, Erode, Tirupur, Karur Salem, Namakkal	1.) Coimbatore - Nilgiris Circle, 2.) Erode - Tiruppur - Karur Circle, 3.) Salem - Namakkal Circle.	8 8 7
Vellore Region	Vellore	Kanchipuram, Tiruvallur, Vellore, Tiruvannamalai, Cuddalore, Villupuram, Dharmapuri, Krishnagiri	1.) Kanchipuram - Tiruvallur Circle, 2.) Vellore-Tiruvannamalai Circle, 3.) Cuddalore - Villupuram Circle, 4.) Dharmapuri - Krishnagiri Circle, 5.) Project Maintenance Circle, Dharmapuri	3 6 4 1 3
Madurai Region	Madurai	Madurai, Dindigul, Theni, Sivagangai, Ramanathapuram, Thoothukudi, Virudhunagar, Thirunelveli, Kanyakumari	1.) Madurai - Dindigul - Theni Circle, 2.)Sivagangai - Ramanathapuram cum Project Maintenance Circle, 3.) Thoothukudi - Virudhunagar Circle, 4.) Thirunelveli, Kanyakumari 5.) Sewerage Circle, Madurai	8 4 6 6 5
Thanjavur Region	Thanjavur	Thanjavur, Thiruvarur, Nagapattinam, Trichy, Perambalur, Pudukottai	1.) Thanjavur - Thiruvarur - Nagapattinam Circle, 2.) Trichy - Perambalur Ariyalur - Pudukottai Circle 3.) Sewerage Circle, Thanjavur 4.) Sewerage Circle, Tindivanam	5 7 2 2

== Combined Water Supply Schemes (CWSS) ==
S.No	Name of the scheme	River	Location	Beneficiaries	Capacity (MLD)	Districts Served
1	Hogenakkal Integrated Drinking Water Project	Cauvery	Hogenakkal	3 Municipalities 17 Town Panchayats 7639 Rural Habitations.	120	Dharmapuri and Krishnagiri
2	Ramanathapuram Mega Drinking Water Supply Project	Cauvery	Mutharasanallur & Kadiakurichi in Trichy District	5 Municipalities 11 Town Panchayats 3163 rural habitations	100	Ramnathapuram, Sivaganga and Pudukottai
3	CWSS to Vellore Corporation, 11 Municipalities, 5 Town Panchayats & 944 wayside Rural habitations in Vellore district	Cauvery	Thottilpatti Village near Mettur Dam	Vellore Corporation 11 Municipalities 5 Town Panchayats 944 Rural habitations	181	Vellore
4	Augmentation of water supply to Palladam Municipality, 23 town panchayats and 965 rural habitations in Coimbatore and Tiruppur District	Bhavani	Pillur reservoir	Palladam Municipality 23 Town panchayats 965 rural habitations	125	Coimbatore and Tiruppur
5	CWSS to Melur, Avaniapuram, Thirumangalam Municipalities, Thirunagar, Vilangudi, Paravai, A.Vellalapatti, Alanganallur, Palamedu Town Panchayats and 1430 rural habitations in 8 unions of Madurai District and Singampunari Town Panchayat in Sivagangai District.	Cauvery	Near Kulithalai	3 Municipalities 7 Town Panchayats 1430 Rural Habitations.	84	Madurai Sivagangai
6	CWSS to 1153 Habitations in 9 Unions and Peravurani, Perumagalur And Adiramapattinam Town Panchayats in Thanjavur District	Kollidam		7 Town Panchayats 1153 Rural Habitations	38.11	Thanjavur
7	CWSS to Natham & 2 Town Panchayats and 1276 Rural Habitations with Bulk Provision to 2 Town Panchayats and 354 Rural Habitations in Dindigul District and Bulk Provision to 135 Habitations in Trichy District	Cauvery		5 Town Panchayats 1765 Rural Habitations	48.10	Dindigul Trichy
8	CWSS To 1751 Rural Habitations in Kunnandarkoil (Part), Gandarvakottai, Karambakudi, Thiruvarangulam, Aranthangi , Viralimalai (Part), Annavasal (Part) and Pudukkottai (Part) Unions of Pudukkottai District and Vallam Town Panchayat in Thanjavur District.	Kollidam	Near Thiruchennampoondi	1 Town Panchayats 1751 Rural Habitations	23.23	Pudukkottai Thanjavur
9	Providing CWSS To 1766 Rural Habitations In Viralimalai (Part), Annavasal (Part), Ponnamaravathy, Tthirumayam, Arimalam, Kunnandarkoil (Part) And Pudukottai (Part) Of Pudukottai District And 125 Habitations In S.pudur And Sakottai Panchayat Union In Sivagangai District	Cauvery	near Thirupparaithurai village.	1766 Rural Habitations	23.12	Pudukottai Sivagangai
10	Providing CWSS To Attur And Narasingapuram Municipalities, 20 Town Panchayats And 1,345 Rural Habitations In 12 Panchayat Unions Of Salem District.	Cauvery	Thottilpatti Village near Mettur Dam	2 Municipalities 20 Town Panchayats 1345 Rural Habitations.	84.134	Salem

== Sewerage schemes ==
S.No.	Name of the scheme
1	Chinnamanur Municipality
2	Maraimalainagar Municipality
3	Namakkal Municipality
4	Ramanathapuram Municipality
5	Dharmapuri Municipality
6	Perambalur Municipality
7	Thiruvannamalai Municipality
8	Thiruvarur Municipality
9	Villupuram Municipality
10	Mamallapuram Town Panchayat
11	Theni- Allinagaram Municipality
12	Thiruchendur Town Panchayat
13	Orathanadu Town Panchayat
14	Cuddalore Municipal Corporation
15	Udumalpettai Municipality
16	Nagapattinam Municipality
17	Pudhukkottai Municipality
18	Thiruvallur Municipality
19	Krishnagiri Municipality
20	Ariyalur Municipality
21	Septage Management in Karunguzhi Town Panchayat
22	Periyakulam Municipality
23	Thoothukkudi Municipal Corporation
24	Virudhunagar Municipality
25	Sivagangai Municipality
26	Nagerkoil Municipal Corporation
27	Mettur Municipality
28	Arakkonam Municipality
29	Thirupathur Municipality
30	Bodinayakkanaur Municipality
31	Rasipuram Municipality
32	Karaikkudi Municipality
33	Chidambaram Municipality
34	Sathur Municipality
35	Sathiyamangalam Municipality
36	Pollachi Municipality
37	Palanichettipatti Town Panchayat
38	Ulundhurpettai Municipality
39	Perundhurai Town Panchayat
40	Thirupporur Town Panchayat
41	Ponneri Municipality
42	Vallam Town Panchayat
43	Mettupalayam Municipality

== See also ==
- Chennai MetroWater Supply and Sewage Board
- Water supply and sanitation in India
