= Water supply and sanitation in Uttar Pradesh =

Water and Sanitation in Uttar Pradesh
- Seal of Uttar Pradesh

Data
- Access to an improved water source: 99.2% (2019-21)
- Access to improved sanitation: 68.7% (2019-21)
- Access to basic drinking water service: 98% (2019-21)
- Percentage of Wastewater treated: 39%

Budget (in crores)
- Annual Budget: 28,054

Water supply and sanitation in Uttar Pradesh, India has seen recent advancements in ensuring comprehensive access and quality. The northern state has a historical record of falling below the national average on critical metrics, leading to sanitation and water access becoming a political focal point, particularly in regions like Bundelkhand. Issues such as unequal resource distribution and water contamination present ongoing challenges.

Government-led initiatives, often in partnership with private sector entities and grassroots organizations, have been created to address the issues of access to safe water and sanitation facilities.

== Access ==
According to the National Family Health Survey 2 (NFHS2) conducted in Uttar Pradesh in 2000, only 85.6% of the population had access to an improved water source. A further 26.7% of respondents had access to a latrine.

Following significant progress, subsequent surveys conducted from 2019 to 2021 indicate that access to improved water sources has increased substantially to 99.2%. Access to latrines has also shown a significant improvement, now reaching 68.7% of the population.

Despite significant progress in improving access to sanitation facilities, Uttar Pradesh still grapples with Open defecation, particularly in rural areas, where approximately 29% of the population continues to defecate in the open. Challenges such as widespread Water scarcity further complicate efforts to provide adequate sanitation and promote hygiene practices.

As of 2019, the Centre for Science and Environment reported that, in some cities of Uttar Pradesh, approximately 80% of containment systems are frequently not connected to functional soak pits.

== See also ==
- Water supply and sanitation in India
- Water resources in India
