= East Calcutta Wetlands =

Complex of natural and human-made wetlands lying east of Kolkata

Coordinates: 22.555°N 88.451°E

Designations

Ramsar Wetland
- Official name: East Calcutta Wetlands
- Designated: 19 August 2002
- Reference no.: 1208

East Kolkata Waterlands

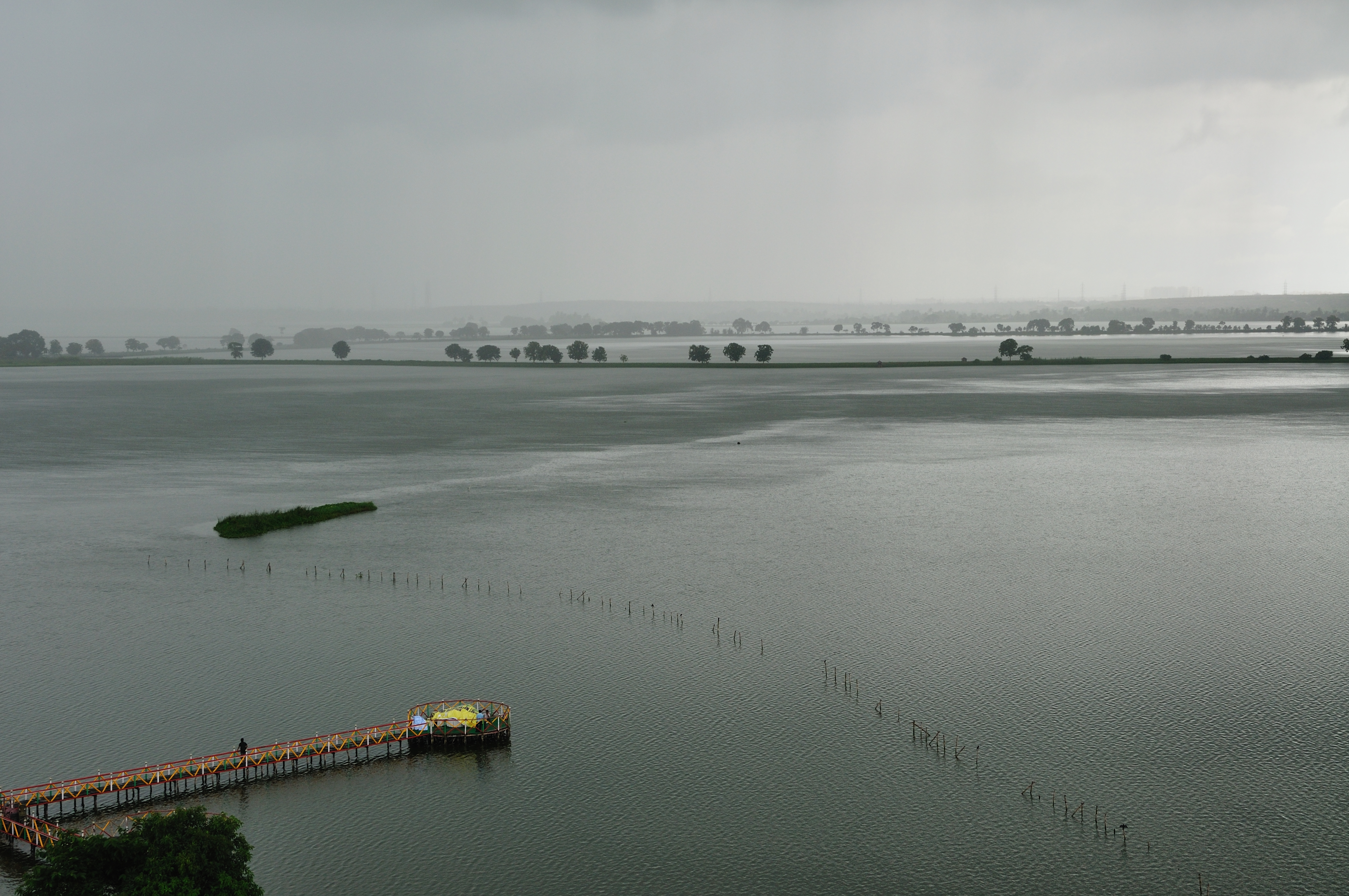
Nalban, a part of the East Kolkata Wetlands.

The East Kolkata Wetlands (officially known as East Calcutta Wetlands) (22 0 27' N 88 0 27' E), are a complex of natural and human-made wetlands lying east of the city of Calcutta (Kolkata), of West Bengal in India. The wetlands cover 125 square kilometres and include salt marshes, and agricultural fields, sewage farms and settling ponds. The wetlands are also used to treat Kolkata's sewage, and the nutrients contained in the wastewater sustain fish farms and agriculture.

EKW treats about 60–80% of Kolkata's sewage naturally as the world's largest organic sewage management system, supporting around 50,000 agro-workers and supplying about one-third of Kolkata's fish requirement.

The name East Calcutta Wetlands was coined by late Dhrubajyoti Ghosh, Special Advisory (Agricultural Ecosystems), Commission on Ecosystem Management, IUCN, who reached this incredible but neglected part of the city when, while working as an engineer for the Government of West Bengal's Water & Sanitation Department, he was searching for an answer to the question: What exactly happens to the city sewage? These natural water bodies which were known just as fisheries provided the answer. Devised by local fishermen and farmers, these wetlands served, in effect, as the natural sewage treatment plant for the city. The East Kolkata Wetlands host the largest sewage fed aquaculture in the world.

It's not widely known that Wetlands Day originated in Kolkata on June 16, 1990, seven years prior to the establishment of World Wetlands Day by the Ramsar Secretariat in 1997.

== Reduction in size of Wetlands ==
Despite protective legislation enacted since 2006, the East Kolkata Wetlands have experienced severe physical reduction: their total area declined from approximately 65 sq km to 41 sq km within just thirty years. This loss has been driven by illegal land conversion for real estate development and infrastructure expansion as Kolkata's urban footprint extended eastward into peri-urban areas. Located in zones of high land value, the wetlands have been consistently subjected to unauthorized occupation and conversion. The continuing reduction in wetland area has directly harmed the livelihoods of fishing communities and sewage farmers who depend on the ecosystem for their economic survival. The resilience of the wetland system has also been compromised, reducing its capacity to absorb flood events and maintain the wastewater treatment services on which the city depends.

== Protecting the East Kolkata Wetlands ==
In 1991 the West Bengal Government accepted an offer by a non-resident Indian to build a World Trade Centre and allotted 227 acres of wetlands for this purpose. As a result, the NGO People United for Better Living in Calcutta (PUBLIC) filed a public interest litigation in the Calcutta High Court arguing for the importance of the wetlands and why they should be left as they were. The order of Justice Umesh Chandra Banerjee on this matter is considered a landmark judgment. Not only did it go into the definition of wetlands and a review of their status in countries such as Australia and the US, he also brought to bear his own research on their functional values and role in "maintaining micro-climatic conditions, absorbing pollution...habitat for aquatic flora fauna... providing a spill basin, and the fragility of the ecosystem." The outcome was that the proposal for the World Trade Centre was turned down in its original form and strict conditions were laid: "I do not find any justiciable reason to disagree with the opinion expressed by the environmentalists that wetland should be preserved and no interference or reclamation should be permitted."

Following the order of the Calcutta High Court in 1992, to its credit, the State Government did not appeal but accepted the ruling. In fact, the Environment Secretary, Kalyan Biswas, applied for the East Calcutta Wetlands to be designated a "wetland of international importance" under the Ramsar Convention. This was obtained in 2002. Finally, in 2006, as a reflection of state and civil society partnership, the East Kolkata Wetlands (Management & Conservation) Act was passed - the first such case of a major environmental legislation being enacted by a state - as distinct from the central - government.

Over the years, these wetlands have faced continuing threats and encroachment. In many instances, the original petitioner, PUBLIC, has had to go to court (High Court, Supreme Court, the National Green Tribunal) to argue on the basis of the 1992 judgment and the later EKW Act to ward off project proposals that were in fact disguised attempts at land-grabbing. While minor encroachments continue even today, the East Kolkata Wetlands still survive. Conservation Methods: 1. To demarcate the boundaries of the East Kolkata wetlands on the field. 2. To take measures or make an order to stop, undo and prevent any unauthorised development project in, or unauthorised use of, or unauthorised act on, the East Kolkata wetlands. 3. To make an order directing demolition or alteration of any hoarding, frame, post, kiosk, structure, neon-signed or sky-sign, erected or exhibited illegally for the purpose of advertisement on any land within the East Kolkata wetlands. 4. To make an order to prevent, prohibit or restrict any mining, quarrying, blasting, or other operations for the purpose of protecting or conserving the East Kolkata wetlands. 5. To take measures to abate pollution in the East Kolkata wetlands and conserve the flora, fauna and biodiversity in general. 6. To prepare action plans conforming to the resolutions taken and recommendations made, from time to time, under the Ramsar Convention and to update the land use maps of the East Kolkata wetlands. 7. To implement and monitor the activities specified in the action plans. 8. To promote research and disseminate findings of such research among the stakeholders; 9. To raise awareness about the utility of the wetlands in general and the East Kolkata wetlands in particular. 10. To promote basic conservation principles like sewage fed pisciculture and eco-tourism in the East Kolkata wetlands. 11. To enforce land use control in the substantially water body-oriented areas and other areas in the East Kolkata wetlands. 12. To detect changes of ecological character and in land use in the East Kolkata wetlands. 13. To establish network with other Ramsar Sites in India. 14. To conduct inquiry or scientific study within the scope of this project. 15. To constitute expert committee within the scope of this project. 16. To enter any land or premises, including to collect samples of air, water, soil and other biological resources, within the scope of this project. 17. To call for relevant records and documents and information from any department, organisation or local body within the scope of this project. 18. To do such act, or pass such order, which may be necessary and expedient for the purpose of conservation and management of the East Kolkata wetlands.

== Flora ==
There are about 100 plant species, which have been recorded in and around the East Calcutta Wetlands, including Sagittaria montividensis, Cryptocoryne ciliata, Cyperus spp., Acrostichum aureum, Ipomoea aquatica, etc. The Sunderbans used to extend up to Patuli in the 1950s.

Several kinds of water hyacinths grow across these wetlands. Local farmers and fisher folk use water hyacinth to create a buffer between land and water to minimise erosion.

The area is also home to large numbers of coconut and betel nut trees. Many varieties of vegetables are farmed here, including cauliflower, eggplant, pumpkin, sunflower and sacred basil. Tracts of land are dedicated to paddy cultivation as well.

== Fauna ==
Numerous species of fish are farmed in the sewage-fed ponds called bheris in the East Kolkata wetlands. These include silver carp and tilapia. The area is also home to the marsh mongoose and small Indian mongoose. Palm civet and small Indian civet are significant in and around East Calcutta Wetlands. Approximately 20 mammals are reported from this region. Snakes found in the East Calcutta Wetland include the checkered keelback (Fowlea piscator), smooth water snake (Enhydris enhydris), buff striped keelback (Amphiesma stolata) and Common bronzeback or Daudin's bronzeback (Dendrelaphis tristis). It is the type locality of a mammalian species called the Salt Lake marsh mongoose. Over 40 species of birds can be spotted at the wetlands. The process of urbanisation however, is leading to the disappearance of many bird species from the area. (Ghosh, A.K., 2004)

== Sewage treatment ==
Kolkata is an example of how natural wetlands are sometimes being utilised in developing countries. Using the purification capacity of wetlands, the Indian city of Kolkata has pioneered a system of sewage disposal. Originally built to house one million (10 lakh) people, Kolkata is now home to over 10 million (over 1 crore) people, with nearly one-third of them living in slums. But the 8,000-hectare East Kolkata Wetlands Ramsar Site, a patchwork of tree-fringed canals, vegetable plots, rice paddies and fish ponds – and the 20,000 people that work in them – daily transform one-third of the city's sewage and most of its domestic refuse into a rich harvest of fish and fresh vegetables. For example, the Mudially Fishermen's Cooperative Society is a collective of 300 families that lease 70 hectares into which wastewater from the city is released. Through a series of natural treatment processes – including the use of Eichhornia crassipes and other plants for absorbing oil, grease and heavy metals – the Cooperative has turned the area into a thriving fish farm and nature park.

== Controversy ==
Recently illegal landfills are on the rise and the wetlands are being slowly assimilated in the stream city. This unprecedented land development and urbanisation are creating concerns about the impact on the environment. Wetlands are under threat due to exponential expansion of real-estate projects in eastern Kolkata especially in the Salt Lake and Rajarhat sectors. Nowadays, land encroachment and land alteration are the important aspect of threats for East Kolkata Wetland (EKW). Transformation from wetland to fishing pond, i.e., aquaculture field are become a potential threat to EKW (Ghosh et al. 2018).

== Microbial Biodiversity ==
Microbial Diversity is an integral part of biodiversity which includes bacteria, archaea, fungi, algae, protozoa and protists (Ghosh, A., 2007). East Kolkata Wetland shows an immense diversity of flora and fauna both at the macro and micro level. Microbial richness of a region is its unseen asset that needs to be explored and conserved. Soil samples collected from ECW shows the presence of various new strains of microbes which are not only ecologically important but also have commercial value (Ghosh, A., 2007). These include Actinobacteria which are responsible for the degradation of nitrophenol, nitroaromatic compounds, pesticides and herbicides; Proteobacteria related to the bioremediation of heavy metals, degradation and recycling of woody tissues of plants, oil contaminated soil and toxic compounds and nitrogen fixation along with the cyanobacters; other bacteria playing important roles in metal accumulation, oil degradation, antimicrobial compound production, enzyme production etc. (Ghosh, A., 2007).

== Role in climate change mitigation ==
Sewage fed aquaculture based artificial wetland, like East Kolkata Wetland (EKW), is a robust example of potential carbon sink and spin-off. EKW can sequester ~1.9 Mg C/ha/year, mitigating at least ~118 Gg atmospheric CO_{2}/year. Plus, carbon uptake by harvested fish crop corresponds to ~61 Gg CO_{2}/year - rewarding US$3.6/kg blue C harvested.

== Conservation and Management Act ==
The East Kolkata Wetlands are managed by the East Kolkata Wetlands Management Authority, established under the East Kolkata Wetlands (Conservation and Management) Act, 2006 - legislation enacted to align domestic law with India's international commitments under the Ramsar Convention.

The act represents an important landmark as it paved way for establishment of the East Kolkata Wetlands Management Authority (EKWMA) for conservation and management of the EKW. The EKWMA is constituted under Section 3 of the Act, 2006. In 2017 Section 3(2) of the Act, 2006 has been amended and the composition of the EKWMA has been changed. The EKWMA is a thirteen (13) member body with the Chief Secretary, Government of West Bengal, Secretaries of different Departments of State Govt. as well as four experts nominated by the State Govt. under the chairmanship of Minister-in-Charge, Department of Environment, Government of West Bengal. The EKWMA is guided by the East Kolkata Wetlands (Conservation and Management) Act, 2006, the East Kolkata Wetlands (Conservation and Management) Rules, 2006, and the Wetlands (Conservation and Management) Rules, 2017. This is probably only wetland which has state enacted laws as well as Central enacted laws applicable.

However, critical governance gaps have been identified in the authority's institutional composition: of the seventeen positions on the management body, fourteen are reserved for government officials, politicians, and bureaucrats, while only one is designated for a representative of the fishermen's cooperatives who must be nominated by the state government. Researchers have argued that this under-representation of primary stakeholders - including fishing communities, sewage farmers, and waste collectors - constitutes a fundamental structural deficit. These communities, who are most directly affected by wetland degradation and who actively sustain the wetland through indigenous knowledge and practice, are effectively marginalized from the governance process.

== Sources ==
1. Urban Wastewater: Livelihoods, Health and Environmental Impacts in India: The Case of the East Calcutta Wetlands by Gautam Gupta, Jadavpur University (see: www.iwmi.cgiar.org/ ... /Urban%20Wastewater%20WS_Kolkata.pdf ).

2. S.Ray Choudhury, A. R. Thakur. Microbial Genetic Resource Mapping of East Kolkata Wetland. Current Science, Vol. 91, No. 2, 2006 25 July.

3. Ghosh, A., Maity, B., Chakrabarti, K., Chattopadhyay, D. (2007). Bacterial diversity of East Calcutta Wet land area: possible identification of potential bacterial population for different biotechnological uses. Microb Ecol. Oct;54(3):452-9.
