= Dhrubajyoti Ghosh =

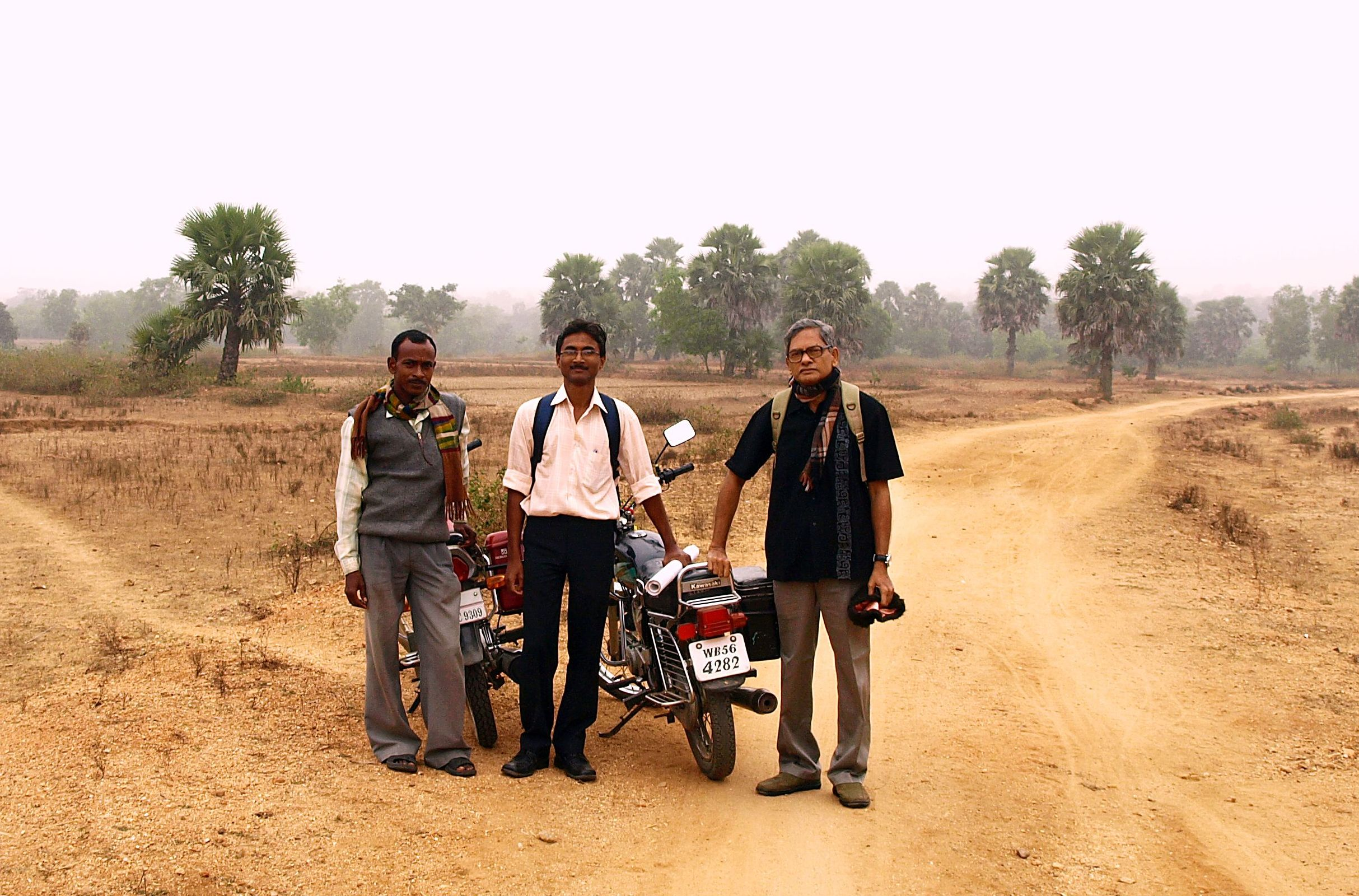
- Dhrubajyoti Ghosh (right) accompanied by two others
- Born: 1947
- Died: 16 February 2018 (aged 70–71)
- Occupation(s): Engineer, ecologist

Dhrubajyoti Ghosh (1947 – 16 February 2018) was a UN Global 500 laureate, special advisor on agricultural ecosystems, part of the Commission on Ecosystem Management, and regional chair for South Asia of the IUCN. He is most credited for devoting his life for the survival of the East Kolkata Wetlands, naming it, and creating the world's only fully functioning organic sewage management system.

== Early life ==
He attended the University of Calcutta in West Bengal, India, and was the first engineer of the university to graduate with a PhD in ecology. He went on to become a sanitation engineer for the West Bengal government, which brought the issues of the Kolkata Wetlands to his sites.

== Work ==
Advocating nature-based solutions, Ghosh's work in the East Kolkata Wetlands showed it could be used for free-of-charge sewage work, fertile aquatic gardens and fisheries, and flood defences with minimal harm to the environment.

Using his position in Ramsar, he secured the protection of the wetlands under the Ramsar Convention. This land soon became the world's only fully functional organic sewage management system, treating 750 million litres/day, using solar UV radiation to purify canals leading into the wetlands. The wetlands are now under threat by developers, which Ghosh constantly resisted during his life. His main complaint on the upkeep of this project is that there is no large scale management or municipal ownership of the system to keep quality control, and there is currently no plans to change that.

His work included being chief of the Department of Environment of the Government of West Bengal, member of the board of trustees of the India World Wide Fund for Nature, fellow of the National Institute of Sciences within the Government of India, member of the management board of the Ramsar Convention, and a member of the National Wetland Committee.

He died in Kolkata on February 16, 2018.

== Other accomplishments ==
- 2005 - Published the book Ecology and Traditional Wetland Practice: Lessons from Wastewater Utilisation in the East Calcutta Wetlands. In it he coined the term "cognitive apartheid", meaning the systematic exclusion of the knowledge of the poor by the elite. ISBN 9788190128155
- August 2016 - First Indian to earn the Luc Hoffmann Award, credited for his work on East Kolkata Wetland.
- 2017 - Published the book The Trash Diggers, exploring the lives of individuals living in a dump site on the fringes of eastern Kolkata. ISBN 9780199474141
- Recognized as an Ashoka Fellow.
