= Hogenakkal Falls water dispute =

Water project implementation conflict in India

The Hogenakkal Water Dispute is a conflict between the Indian states of Tamil Nadu and Karnataka over the implementation of Hogenakkal Integrated Drinking Water Project, whose foundation stone was laid in February 2008. The Rs. 13.34 billion project envisages water supply to 4040,000 people in the fluorosis affected Dharmapuri and Krishnagiri districts of Tamil Nadu.

== Background ==
=== Kaveri water dispute ===
Water from Kaveri river has been a bone of contention between the states of Karnataka and Tamil Nadu and its erstwhile Kingdom of Mysore and Madras Presidency and thus a century old dispute. As part of several reconciliation measures taken to ease the crisis the Union Water Resource Ministry of Government of India convened a meeting between the representatives of the states in which Governments of Karnataka and Tamil Nadu agreed on two projects, drinking water for Bangalore city in Karnataka drawn from KRS Dam and other in Hogenakkal in Tamil Nadu. According to the project, at a particular spot in the waterfall water from the Cauvery is to be drawn and distributed to people of Tamil Nadu. Karnataka agreed to abide by the conditions imposed by the Union Water Resources Ministry if Tamil Nadu withdrew its objections to Cauvery water being used to augment supply to Bangalore for which Tamil Nadu had voiced objections but Tamil Nadu later withdrew its objections to Karnataka using its share of Cauvery water for supply to Bangalore. The project was put on hold after widespread protests in Karnataka.

=== Hogenakkal island (unnamed) ownership dispute ===
Hogenakkal is part of Koothapadi panchayat village within the Pennagaram sub-district of Dharmapuri district., but the ownership of a piece of an uninhabited island near the waterfalls is contested by Karnataka and this further strains the relationship between the states.

== Karnataka perspective ==
Karnataka is opposed to the project on the grounds that its share of the Kaveri waters will be affected and that the picturesque waterfall belongs to it (based on erstwhile topographical map of Madras Presidency), thereby alleging that the drinking water project at Hogenakkal is illegal.

== Tamil Nadu perspective ==
The Hogenakkal project was approved in 1998 by Union government of India. The project just like the Bangalore project an extra demand on the neighbouring state for Cauvery water since each state would use its share. The Hindu – Karnataka gave consent in 1998 to Hogenakkal project: Tamil Nadu

== Timeline ==
- May 1997 – States of Karnataka and Tamil Nadu agree on two projects to be set for both power and irrigation, with one in Mekedatu in Karnataka and other in Hogenakkal in Tamil Nadu.
- 26 February 2008 – Chief Minister of Tamil Nadu, M. Karunanidhi laid the foundation stone for the project.
- 16 March 2008 – Chief Minister of Karnataka, B.S. Yeddyurappa organised a protest at Hogenakkal against the project.
- 27 March 2008 – the Tamil Nadu Assembly adopted a resolution, urging the centre to extend "full cooperation and help" in executing the project.
- 31 March 2008 – Karnataka state government requested Tamil Nadu to stop all development projects at Hogenakkal. It sought Central Government's intervention to resolve the controversy.
- 2 April 2008 – Widespread protests across Karnataka against the project.
- 5 April 2008 – Chief Minister Karunanidhi announced that the project would be put on hold until a new government assumes charge in Karnataka.
- 17 June 2008 – unit office of the Hogenakkal water supply project was opened at Oddapatti near Dharmapuri .

== See also ==
- Hogenakkal Falls
- Hogenakkal Integrated Drinking Water Project
- Kaveri River Water Dispute
