= Hogenakkal Integrated Drinking Water Project =

Fluorosis mitigation project in Tamil Nadu, India

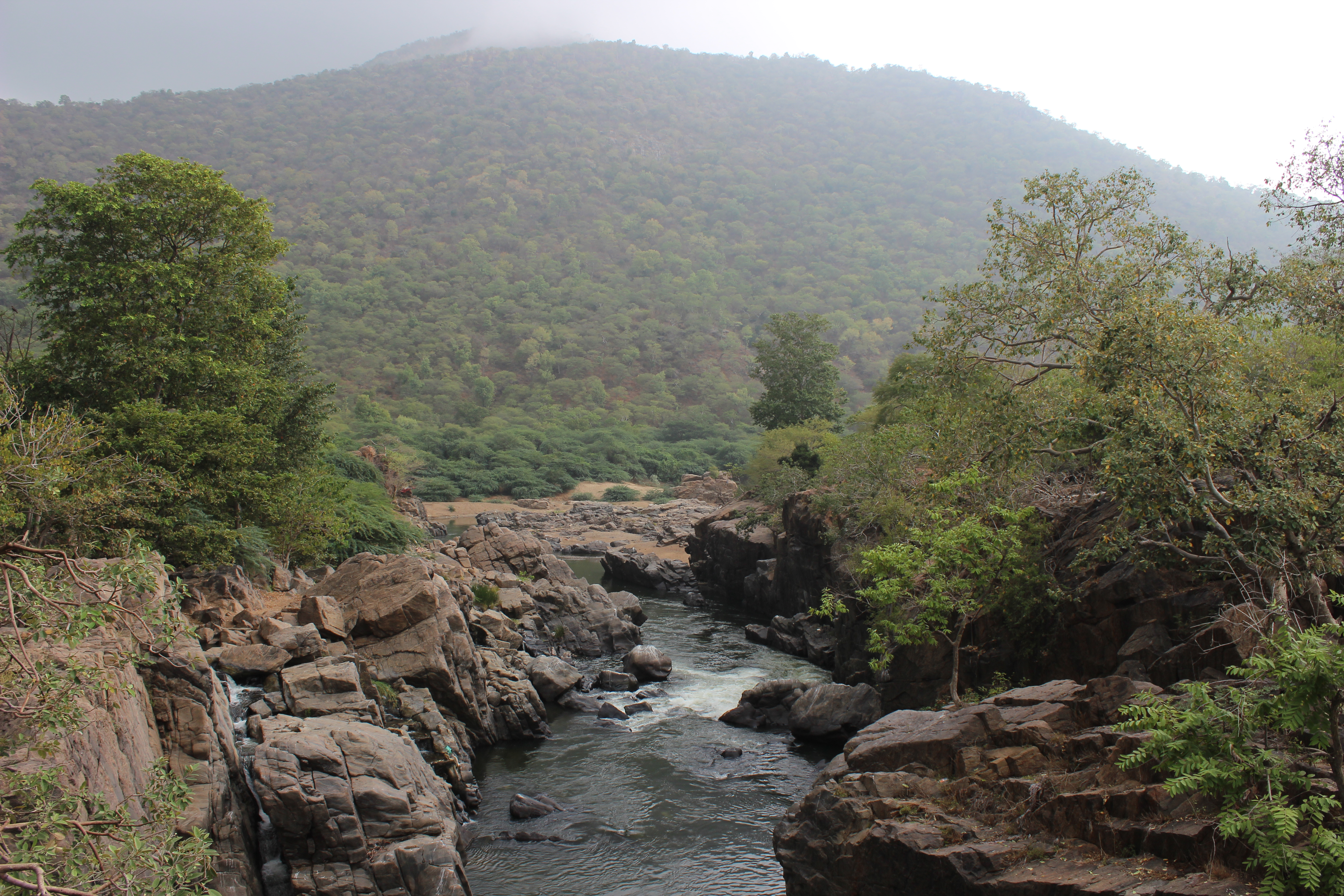
Mountain near the Hogenakkal falls

Hogenakkal Integrated Drinking Water Project is a fluorosis mitigation drinking water project being undertaken at Hogenakkal, Dharmapuri district, state of Tamil Nadu, India. It is scheduled to be executed by Tamil Nadu Water Supply and Drainage Board (TWAD), with funding from Japan Bank for International Cooperation (JBIC) using Tamil Nadu's share of Cauvery river water. The project aims to supply safe drinking water to drought prone & fluorosis affected Dharmapuri and Krishnagiri districts of Tamil Nadu.

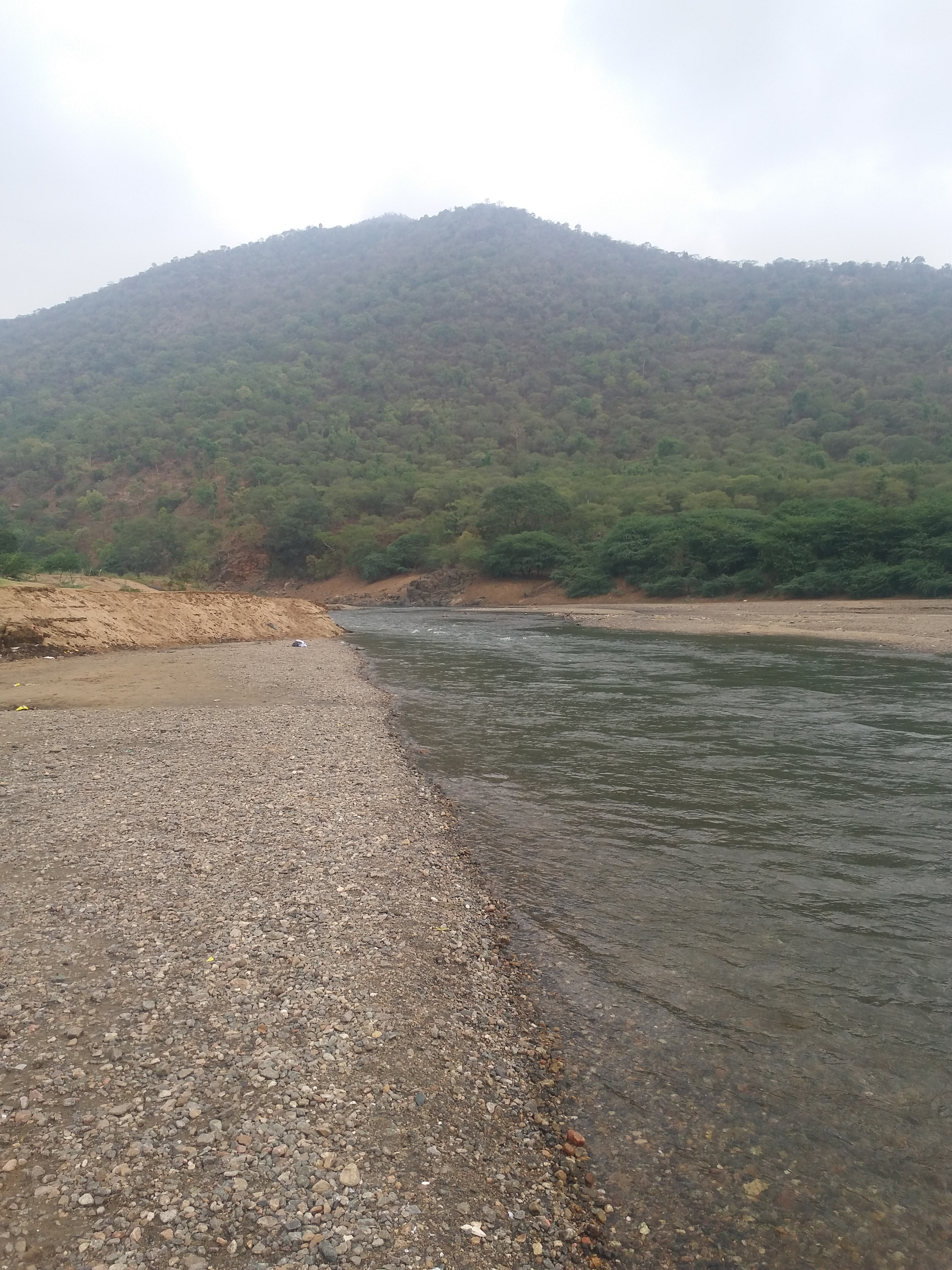
Water flow near Hogenakkal falls in Tamil Nadu

== Background ==
Dharmapuri and Krishnagiri districts of Tamil Nadu are drought prone and had been the cause of high political debates and riots. Although the Kaveri river enters the state at Biligundulu in Krishnagiri district, it does not contribute to irrigation or drinking water purposes there. With 10 of the 29 constituent districts in Tamil Nadu affected by fluorosis, Dharmapuri district has the highest concentration of endemic fluoride in the State.

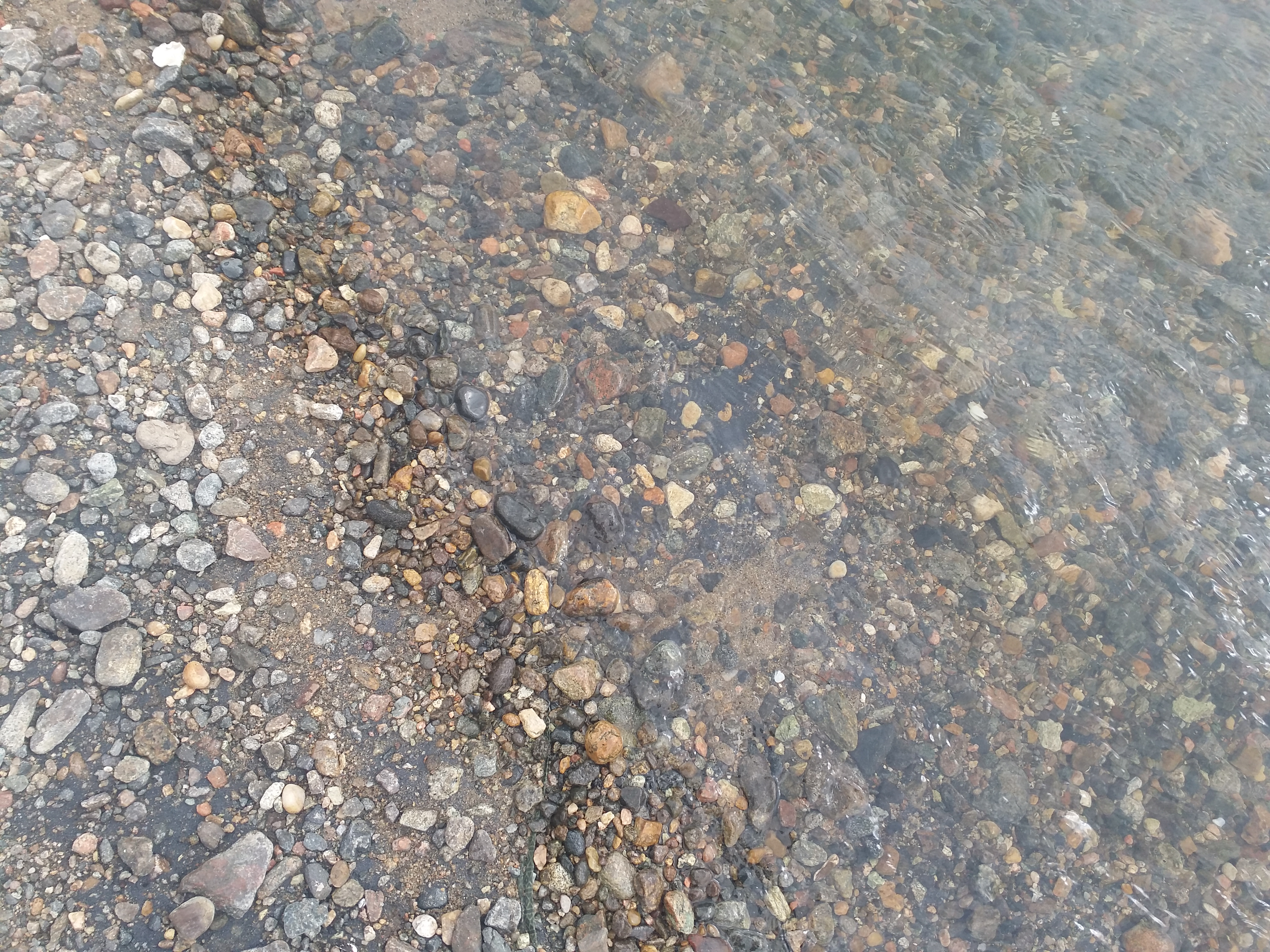
Clear water in Hogenakkal falls in Tamil Nadu

== Project details ==
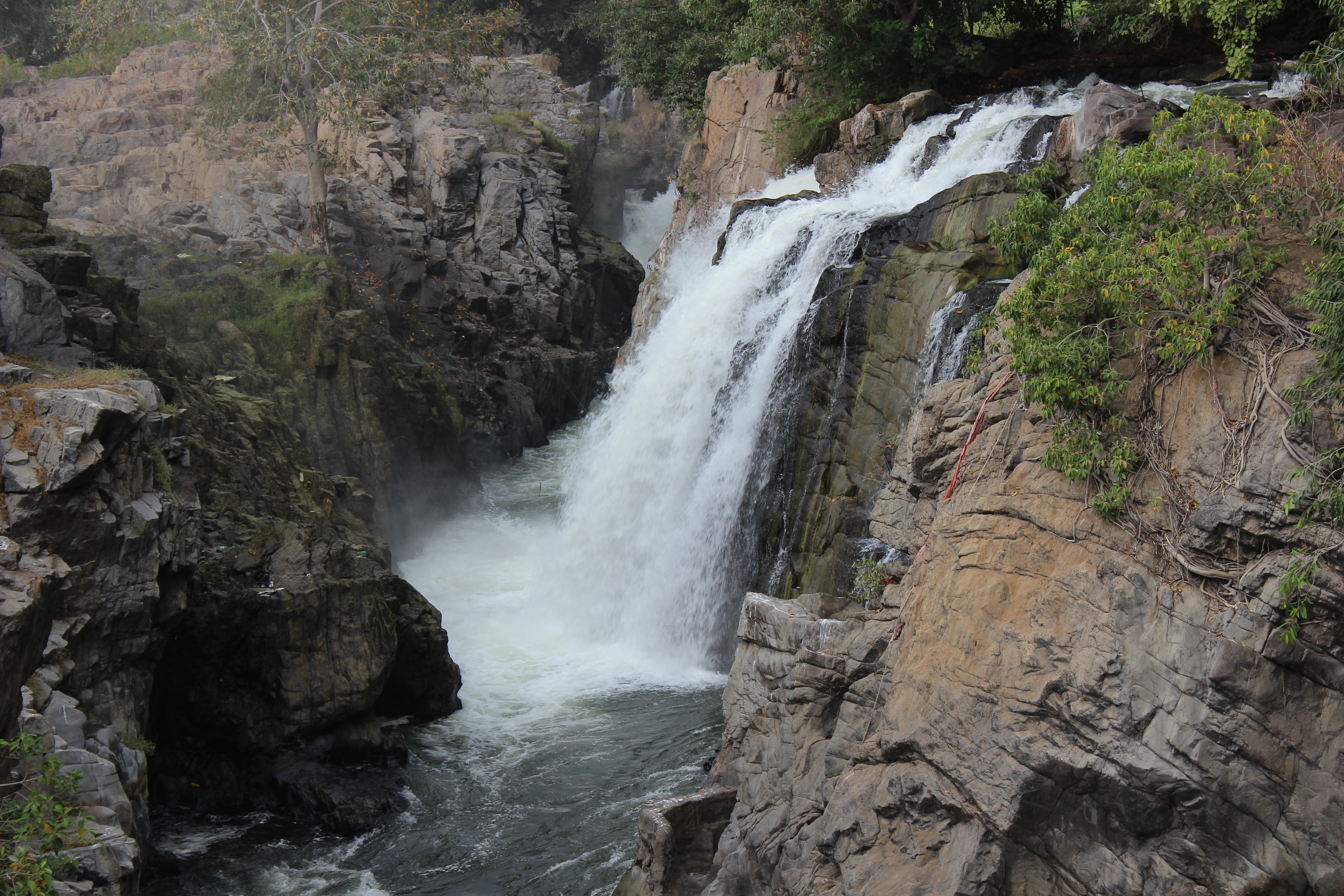
View of hogenakkal falls from hanging bridge

The total cost of this entire fluorosis mitigation project is Rs. 13.34 billion. 1.4 tmc feet of water is to be utilised for the Hogenakkal drinking water project. It will be from Tamil Nadu's share of Cauvery water, thereby placing no extra demand on Karnataka.

=== 1998 Pact on Bangalore & Hogenakal Projects ===
The Tamil Nadu government has received a no objection certificate from the central government for the Hogenakkal drinking water scheme. A similar agreement with the J. H. Patel led government of Karnataka in 1998 was based on the premise that both states won't obstruct drinking water schemes from Cauvery as long as the water drawn for such a project is sourced from the respective state's share of Cauvery water, whose proceedings have been recorded. A copy of the letter given to the then Tamil Nadu Government Chief Secretary from the Union Ministry of Water Resources can be found here.

=== Areas covered ===
The project is expected to cover 6,755 households in three municipal areas, 17 panchayats and 18 town panchayats, benefiting about three million people. Drinking water will be pumped to a master balancing reservoir at Madam, about 11 km from Hogenakkal. After treatment, water will be pumped for 145 km to cover areas such as Palakkodu, Marandahalli and Hosur in Tamil Nadu. Remaining areas in Krishnagiri and Dharmapuri districts will be covered by taking advantage of altitude gradient.

== Status of the project- Timeline ==
=== 29 June 1998 ===
In 1998, Karnataka agreed to abide by the conditions imposed by the Union Water Resources Ministry if Tamil Nadu withdrew its objections to the Cauvery water being used to augment supply to Bangalore, according to the minutes of a meeting convened by the Union Secretary (Water Resources) and attended by officers of the Cauvery basin States on drinking water supply schemes of Karnataka and Tamil Nadu on 29 June 1998.

=== 26 February 2008 ===
Chief Minister of Tamil Nadu, M. Karunanidhi laid the foundation stone for the project on 26 February 2008.

=== May, 2008 ===
The Tamil Nadu government's proposed project was undertaken in the Karanataka state’s revenue land. Also, the government was not ready to abide by the earlier agreement as not to disrupt the drinking water projects. If TN government is ready to abide by the agreement and allow Karnataka government to proceed with its Mekedatu project, both these issues may find an end. Yeddiurappa, Chief Minister of Karnataka claimed that the proposed drinking water project site in Hogenakkal is situated in Karnataka and thus sparked controversy. Soon after Yeddiurappa's claim other political parties in Karnataka followed suit. The agitations that followed in Karnataka targeted the Tamils until the Assembly elections got over there. As a result of the protests, Government of Tamil Nadu announced on 5 April 2008 that it will wait till a new government takes charge in Karnataka. M Karunanidhi, the chief Minister of Tamil Nadu reportedly said, "the project will not be shelved".

=== June, 2008 ===
As a first step toward the implementation of the project, the unit office of the Hogenakkal water supply project was opened at Oddapatti near Dharmapuri on 17 June 2008.

=== May, 2013 ===
On Wednesday (29/05/2013) Chief Minister J Jayalalithaa launches the Hogenakkal Drinking Water Scheme through videoconferencing from Chennai.

== See also ==
- Hogenakkal Water Dispute
- Hogenakkal Falls
