= Pirana Landfill =

Landfill in Ahmedabad, India

Coordinates: 22.980°N 72.566°E

Pirana Landfill (also called Pirana Dump Yard) is a large municipal solid waste site located in Ahmedabad, Gujarat, India. In use since 1982, it is one of the largest and oldest landfills in India. The site has become infamous for its towering garbage mounds, health hazards and environmental challenges.

The Pirana landfill was established in 1982 to receive solid waste generated by the Ahmedabad Municipal Corporation (AMC). For decades, it served as the primary waste disposal site for the city. As urban waste generation increased, the landfill became severely overburdened. Despite reaching full capacity, it continued to operate into the 2020s.

== Impact and remediation efforts ==
As of 2023, the landfill had received over 126 lakh metric tonnes of waste. Waste from the city has been dumped in an unsegregated form, leading to massive accumulations of garbage, including non-biodegradable materials like plastic and rubber. The landfill's expansion led to environmental degradation and health issues for nearby residents.

Pirana Landfill has been linked to severe public health problems in surrounding areas. Residents have reported illnesses due to air pollution, noxious odors, and contaminated groundwater<. Additionally, water used to control dust and fires at the site has led to significant water wastage—reportedly up to 48,000 liters daily.

== Fires ==
The Pirana Landfill has experienced frequent fires over the years. These fires are often caused by the accumulation of methane gas from decomposing waste and the presence of flammable materials like plastic and rubber. They release thick smoke and toxic fumes, lowering air quality in Ahmedabad and causing health problems for people nearby.

In April 2017, the landfill caught fire again, producing large plumes of smoke and a foul smell across the city. The same month, another report stated that thousands of residents were affected by the smoke, and the municipal corporation struggled to control the fire.

Fires have occurred close together in time. In October 2016, two major fires happened just five days apart. In October 2017, the landfill was still burning several days after a fire started, causing continuing smoke and fumes.

In another October 2016 incident, firefighters took nine hours to control a large fire, which officials said could have turned into a disaster similar to Mumbai's Deonar landfill fire.

These fires release harmful gases. Residents near the landfill report breathing problems, and some health experts have warned about long-term cancer risks. In December 2016, fireworks and flammable waste after Diwali caused another fire, described in media reports as turning Pirana into a "fiery pit of hell."

One cause of these fires is the dumping of already burning garbage by trucks. In some cases, open flames are introduced by accident during unloading.

After a fire in October 2019, the Pirana area recorded the city's worst air quality index (AQI). However, some residents reported that pollution monitoring systems like SAFAR did not reflect the severity of the smoke.

== Current Status ==
As of early 2024, AMC has reported significant progress in remediation. The landfill remains partially active, with sections still under processing. City officials expect full reclamation of the site within the next three to five years, though concerns persist regarding long-term environmental sustainability.

== See also ==
- Deonar dumping ground
- Ghazipur landfill
- Mavallipura
- Okhla landfill
- Waste management in India
