= Bandhwari Landfill =

Landfill in Gurugram, Haryana, India

Coordinates: 28.4025°N 77.1716°E

An image of the landfill photographed from Gurgaon.

Bandhwari Landfill is a large municipal solid waste site located near Gurugram, Haryana, India. Established in 2008, it serves as the primary dumping ground for waste from Gurugram and Faridabad. Over the years, it has drawn criticism for frequent fires, groundwater contamination, and encroachment into the ecologically sensitive Aravalli Range.

== History ==
The Bandhwari landfill was commissioned in 2008 to manage growing waste from Gurugram and Faridabad. Initially designed to handle around 1,200 tonnes of waste per day, it currently receives approximately 2,000 tonnes daily.

A municipal waste composition analysis in 2025 revealed that plastic comprises approximately 25% of total waste entering the landfill, significantly contributing to its bulk and fire risk.

== Environmental impact ==
=== Groundwater contamination ===
Studies by the Central Pollution Control Board have found that leachate from the landfill has polluted local groundwater. Nearby residents report the water is unfit for drinking and may pose serious health risks. A 2023 study in the Journal of Water and Health concluded that ingestion of groundwater from the surrounding area posed potential health risks due to heavy metal contamination.

In 2025, leachate was reported to have been illegally sprayed outside the landfill compound to settle dust pollution, prompting a government inquiry.

=== Aravalli degradation ===
The landfill borders the Aravalli Range, a fragile ecological zone. Environmentalists warn that dumping and spillage have harmed native flora and fauna. Fires and unregulated operations have affected forest patches adjacent to the site.

== Fires ==
Bandhwari has witnessed frequent landfill fires, with over 70 incidents reported between March and June 2024. Fires are primarily caused by methane accumulation from decomposing organic waste. In April 2025, major fires occurred on 3, 6, 21, and 26 April, producing thick smoke and noxious fumes.

Firefighting efforts have been difficult; officials report that extinguishing one blaze often leads to another smouldering ember reigniting. The Supreme Court of India has expressed concern over the situation, noting the severe environmental and health implications.

Following criticism, the National Green Tribunal (NGT) ordered the installation of methane sensors, fire safety equipment, patrolling teams, and fencing at the site.

== See also ==
- Waste management in India
- Ghazipur landfill
- Deonar dumping ground
- Aravalli Range
