= Environmental issues in India =

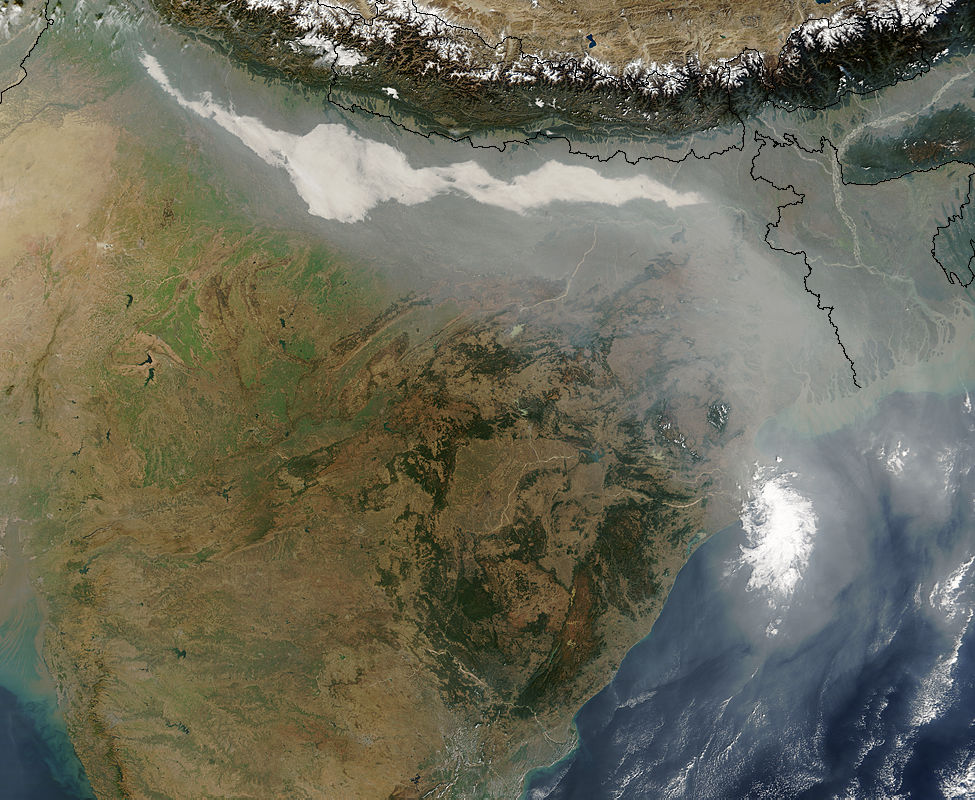
A satellite picture, taken in 2004, shows thick haze and smog along the Ganges Basin in northern India. More sources of aerosols in this area are believed to be smoke from biomass burning in the northwest part of India, and air pollution from large cities in northern India since the 1980s. Dust from deserts in Pakistan and the Middle East may also contribute to the mix of aerosols.

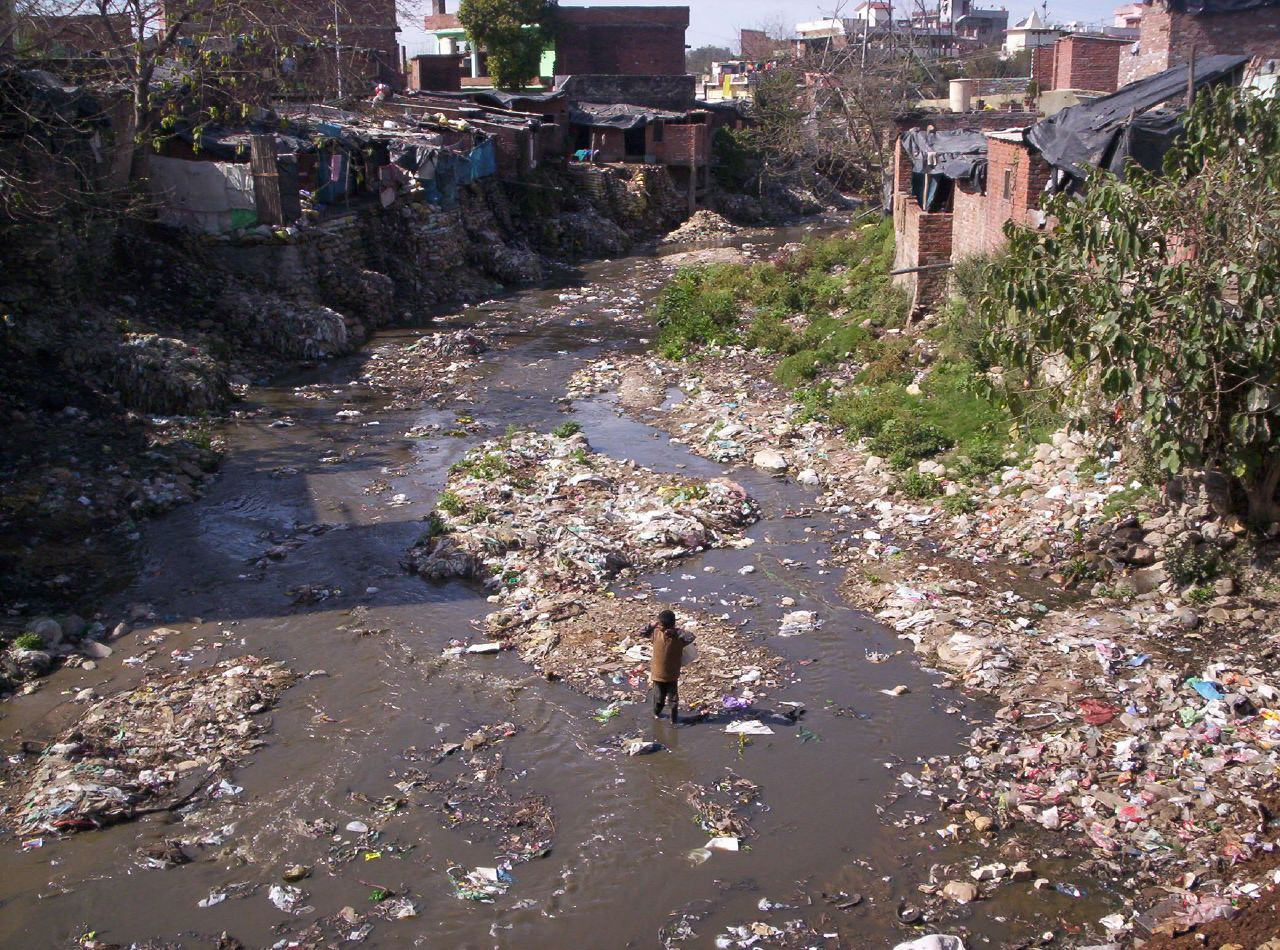
Solid waste adds to water pollution in India, 2005.

There are multiple environmental issues in India. Air pollution, water pollution, garbage, domestically prohibited goods and pollution of the natural environment are all challenges for India. Nature is also causing some drastic effects on India. Environmental issues are one of the primary causes of disease, health issues and long term livelihood impact for India.

The situation was worse between 1947 through 1995. According to data collected and environmental assessments studied by World Bank experts, between 1995 through 2010, India has made some of the fastest progress in addressing its environmental issues and improving its environmental quality in the world. However, pollution still remains a major challenge and opportunity for the country.

== Law and policies ==
The British Raj saw several laws related to environment conservation. Amongst the earliest ones were the Shore Nuisance (Bombay and Kolkata) Act of 1853 and the Oriental Gas Company Act of 1857. The Indian Penal Code of 1860, imposed a fine on anyone who voluntarily fouled the water of any public spring or reservoir. In addition, the Code penalised negligent acts. British India also enacted laws aimed at controlling air pollution. Prominent amongst these were the Bengal Smoke Nuisance Act of 1905 and the Bombay Smoke Nuisance Act of 1912. Although these laws had limited effectiveness, they laid the foundation for the development of environmental regulations in India.

Upon independence from Britain, India adopted a constitution and numerous British-enacted laws, without any specific constitutional provision on protecting the environment. India amended its constitution in 1976. Article 48(A) of Part IV of the amended constitution, read: The State shall endeavour to protect and improve the environment and to safeguard the forests and wildlife of the country. Article 51 A (g) imposed additional environmental mandates on the Indian state.

Other Indian laws from recent history include the Water (Prevention and Control of Pollution) Act of 1974, the Forest (Conservation) Act of 1980, and the Air (Prevention and Control of Pollution) Act of 1981. The Air Act was inspired by the decisions made at the Stockholm Conference. The Bhopal gas tragedy triggered the Government of India to enact the Environment (Protection) Act of 1986. India also enacted a set of Noise Pollution (Regulation & Control) Rules in 2000.

In 1985, the Indian government created the Ministry of Environment and Forests. This ministry is the central administrative organisation in India for regulating and ensuring environmental protection.

Despite the active passage of laws by the central government of India, the reality of environmental quality mostly worsened between 1947 and 1990. Due to poverty, most people in rural regions had no choice but to sustain life in whatever way possible. This led to consecutively increasing levels of air, water and soil pollution. However, starting in the 1990s, reforms were introduced. Since then, for the first time in Indian history, major air pollutant concentrations have dropped in every 5-year period. Between 1992 and 2010, satellite data confirms India's forest coverage has increased for the first time by over 4 million hectares, a 7% increase. In August 2019, the Indian government imposed a nationwide ban on single-use plastics that would take effect on 2 October.

== Possible causes ==
Some have cited economic development as the cause regarding the environmental issues. It is suggested that India's growing population is the primary cause of India's environmental degradation. Empirical evidence from countries such as Japan, England and Singapore, each with population density similar to or higher than that of India, yet each enjoying environmental quality vastly superior to India's, suggests population density may not be the only factor affecting India's issues.

== Major issues ==
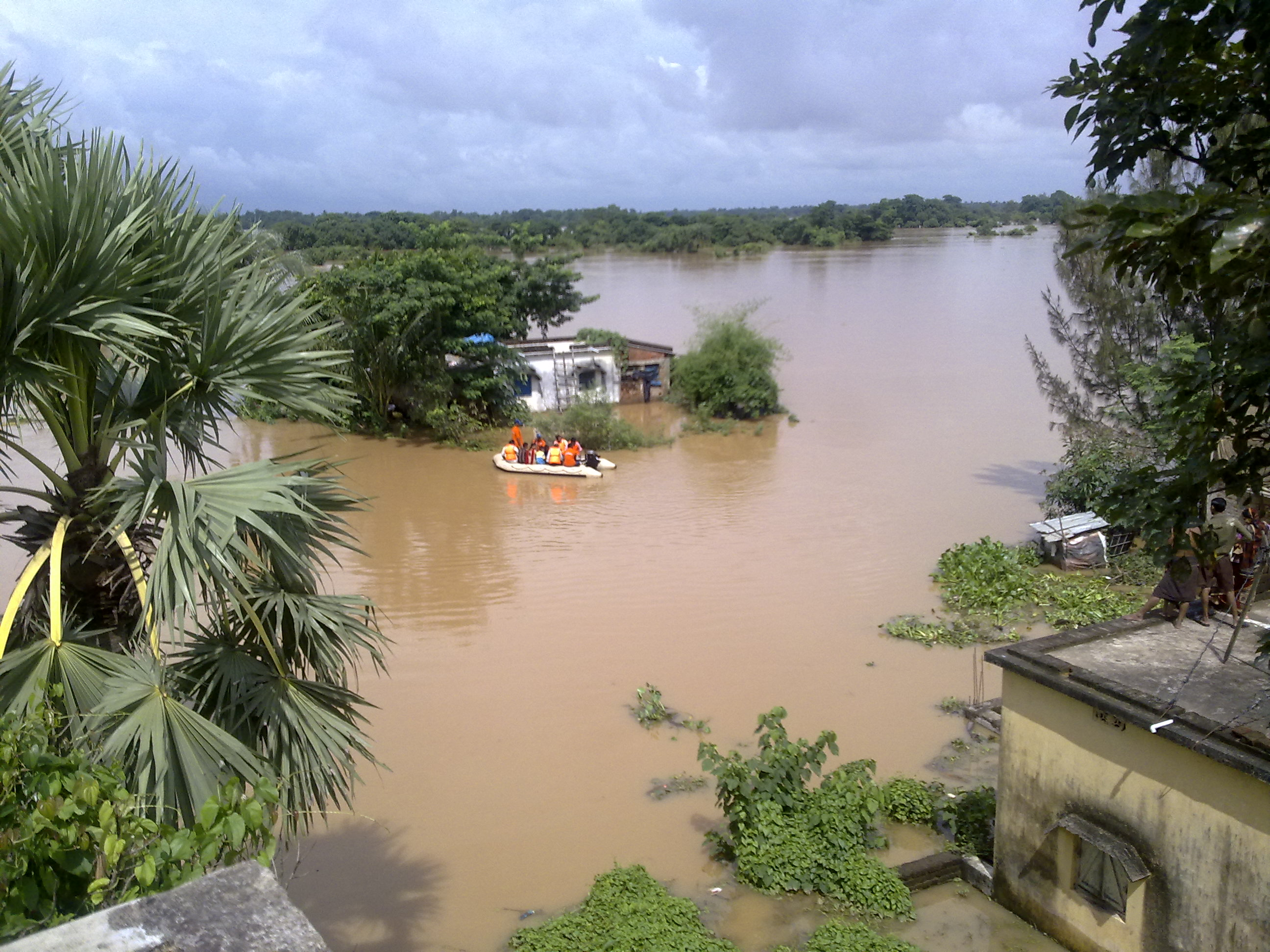
Floods are a significant environmental issue for India. It causes soil erosion, destruction of wetlands and wide migration of solid wastes.

Development of carbon dioxide emissions.

Major environmental issues are forests and agricultural degradation of land, resource depletion (such as water, mineral, forest, sand, and rocks), environmental degradation, public health, loss of biodiversity, loss of resilience in ecosystems, livelihood security for the poor.

The major sources of pollution in India include the rapid burning of fuelwood and biomass such as dried waste from livestock as the primary source of energy, lack of organised garbage and waste removal services, lack of sewage treatment operations, lack of flood control and monsoon water drainage system, diversion of consumer waste into rivers, using large land area for burial purposes, cremation practices near major rivers, government mandated protection of highly polluting old public transport, and continued operation by Indian government of government-owned, high emission plants built between 1950 and 1980.

Air pollution, poor management of waste, growing water scarcity, falling groundwater tables, water pollution, preservation and quality of forests, biodiversity loss, and land/soil degradation are some of the major environmental issues India faces today.

India's population growth adds pressure to environmental issues and its resources. Rapid urbanization has caused a buildup of heavy metals in the soil of the city of Ghaziabad, and these metals are being ingested through contaminated vegetables. Heavy metals are hazardous to people's health and are known carcinogens.

=== Population growth and environmental quality ===
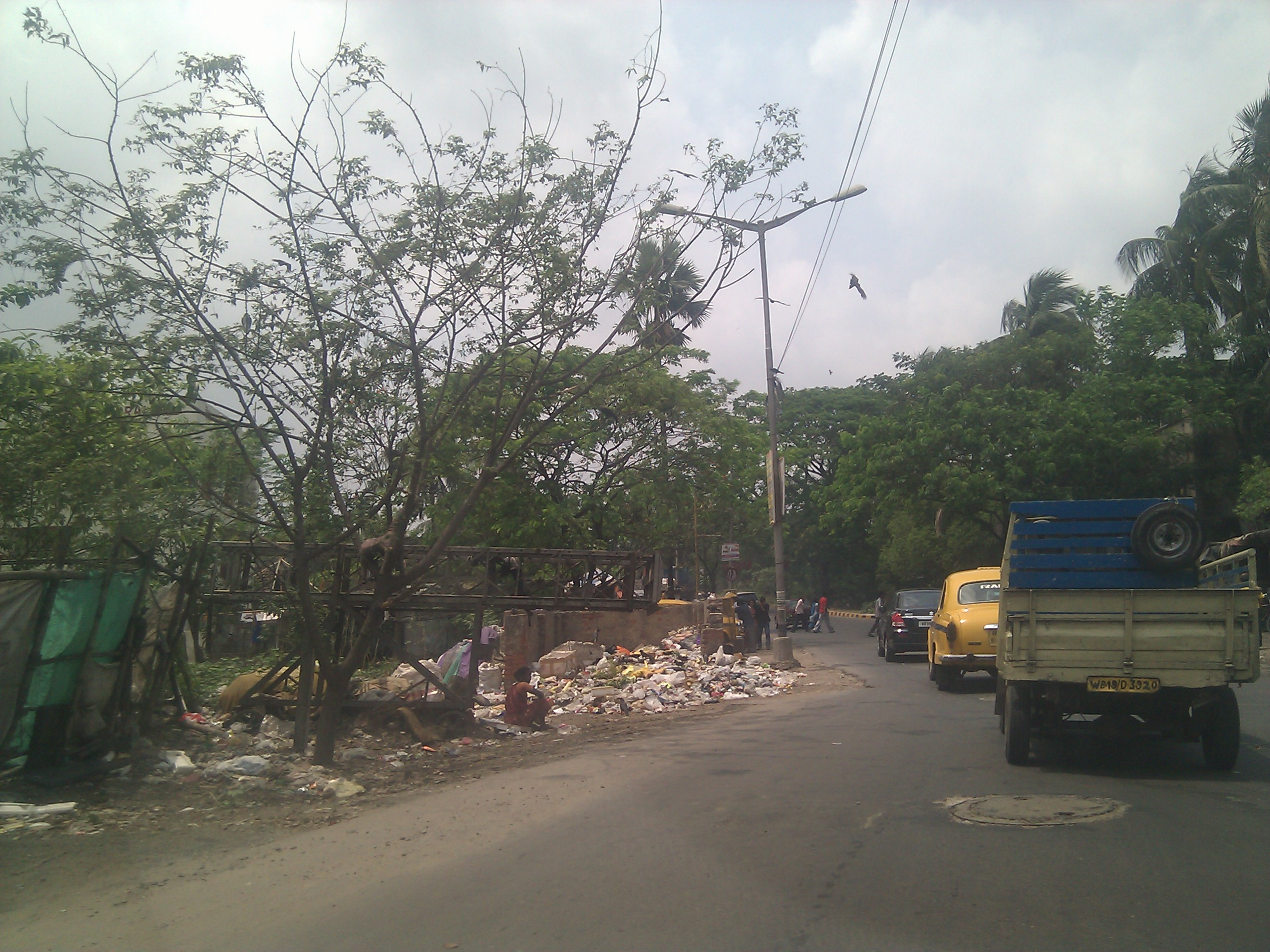
Public dumping of garbage alongside a road in Kolkata.

There is a long history of study and debate about the interactions between population growth and the environment. According to Thomas Robert Malthus, a growing population exerts pressure on agricultural land, causing environmental degradation, and forcing the cultivation of land of higher as well as poorer quality. This environmental degradation ultimately reduces agricultural yields and food availability, famines and diseases and death, thereby reducing the rate of population growth.

Population growth, because it can place increased pressure on the assimilative capacity of the environment, is also seen as a major cause of air, water, and solid-waste pollution. The result, Malthus theorised, is an equilibrium population that enjoys low levels of both income and Environmental quality. Malthus suggested positive and preventative forced control of human population, along with abolition of poor laws.

Malthus theory, published between 1798 and 1826, has been analysed and criticised ever since. The American thinker Henry George, for example, observed with his characteristic piquancy in dismissing Malthus: "Both the jayhawk and the man eat chickens; but the more jayhawks, the fewer chickens, while the more men, the more chickens." Similarly, the American economist Julian Lincoln Simon criticised Malthus's theory. He noted that the facts of human history have proven the predictions of Malthus and of the Neo-Malthusians to be flawed. Massive geometric population growth in the 20th century did not result in a Malthusian catastrophe. The possible reasons include: increase in human knowledge, rapid increases in productivity, innovation and application of knowledge, general improvements in farming methods (industrial agriculture), mechanisation of work (tractors), the introduction of high-yield varieties of rice and wheat among other plants (Green Revolution), the use of pesticides to control crop pests.

More recent scholarly articles concede that whilst there is no question that population growth may contribute to environmental degradation, its effects can be modified by economic growth and modern technology. Research in environmental economics has uncovered a relationship between environmental quality, measured by ambient concentrations of air pollutants and per capita income. This so-called environmental Kuznets curve shows environmental quality worsening up until about $5,000 of per capita income on purchasing parity basis, and improving thereafter. The key requirement, for this to be true, is continued adoption of technology and scientific management of resources, continued increases in productivity in every economic sector, entrepreneurial innovation and economic expansion.

Other data suggest that population density has little correlation to environmental quality and human quality of life. India's population density, in 2011, was about 368 human beings per square kilometre. Many countries with population density similar or higher than India enjoy environmental quality as well as human quality of life far superior than India. For example: Singapore (7148 /km^{2}), Hong Kong (6349 /km^{2}), South Korea (487 /km^{2}), Netherlands (403 /km^{2}), Belgium (355 / km^{2}), England (395 /km^{2}) and Japan (337/ km^{2}).

=== Water pollution ===
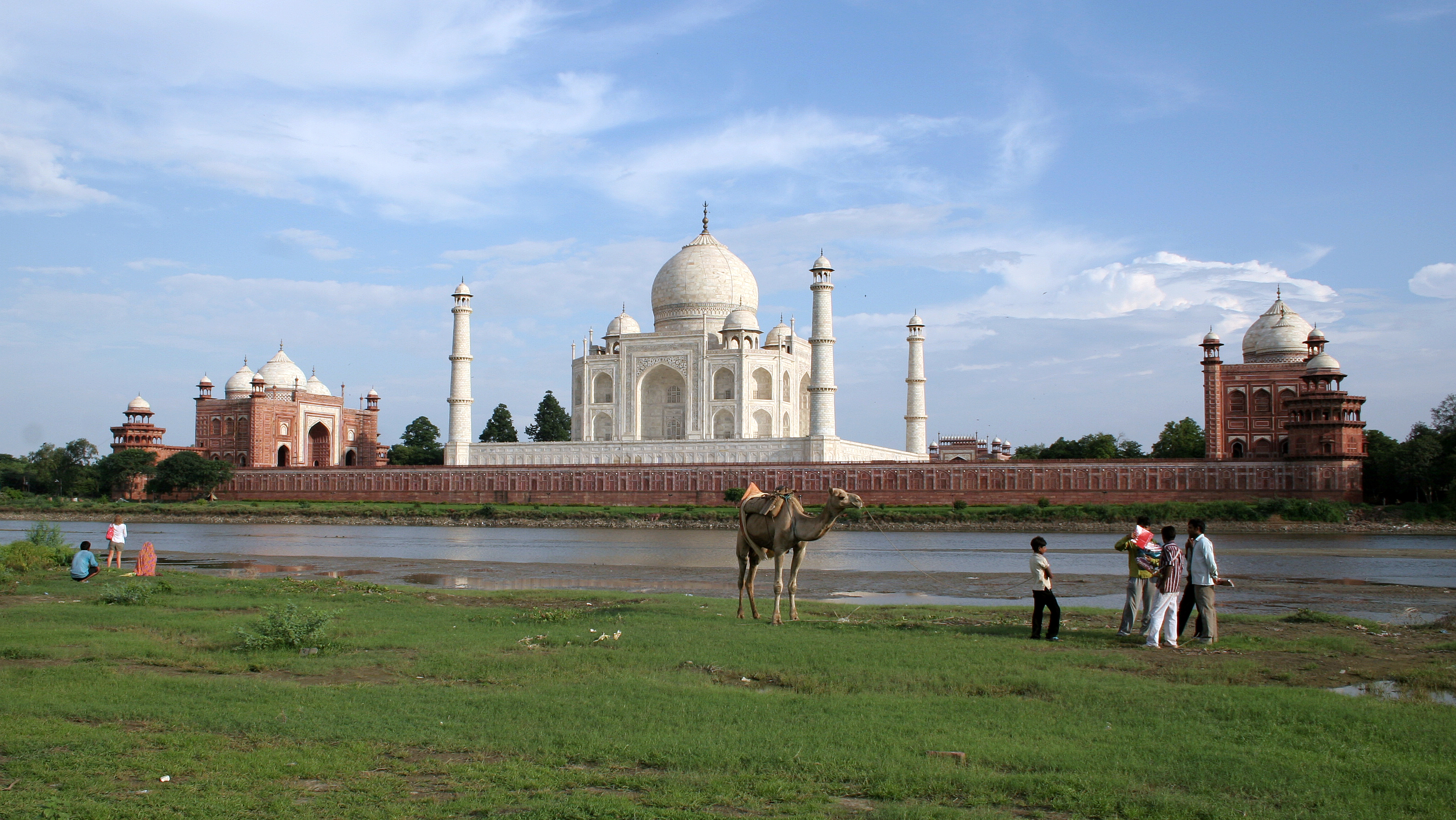
The Taj Mahal next to the Yamuna river.

India has major water pollution issues. Discharge of untreated sewage is an important cause for pollution of surface and ground water in India, since there is a large gap between the generation and treatment of domestic waste water. The problem is not only that India lacks sufficient treatment capacity but also that the sewage treatment plants that exist do not operate and are not maintained. The majority of government-owned sewage treatment plants remain closed most of the time due to improper design, poor maintenance, or lack of reliable electricity supply, along with severe understaffing. The waste water generated in these areas normally percolates in the soil or evaporates. The uncollected waste accumulates in urban areas, causing unhygienic conditions and releasing pollutants that reach to surface and groundwater.

According to a World Health Organization study, out of India's 3,119 towns and cities, just 209 had partial sewage treatment facilities, and only 8 have full wastewater treatment facilities (1992). Over 100 Indian cities dump untreated sewage directly into the Ganges River. Investment is needed to bridge the gap between 29,000 million litre per day of sewage India generates, and a treatment capacity of mere 6000 million litre per day.

Other sources of water pollution include agriculture runoff and small scale factories along the rivers and lakes of India. Fertilizers and pesticides used in agriculture in northwestern India have been found in rivers, lakes and ground water. Flooding during monsoons worsens India's water pollution problem, as it washes and moves all sorts of solid garbage and contaminated soils into its rivers and wetlands.

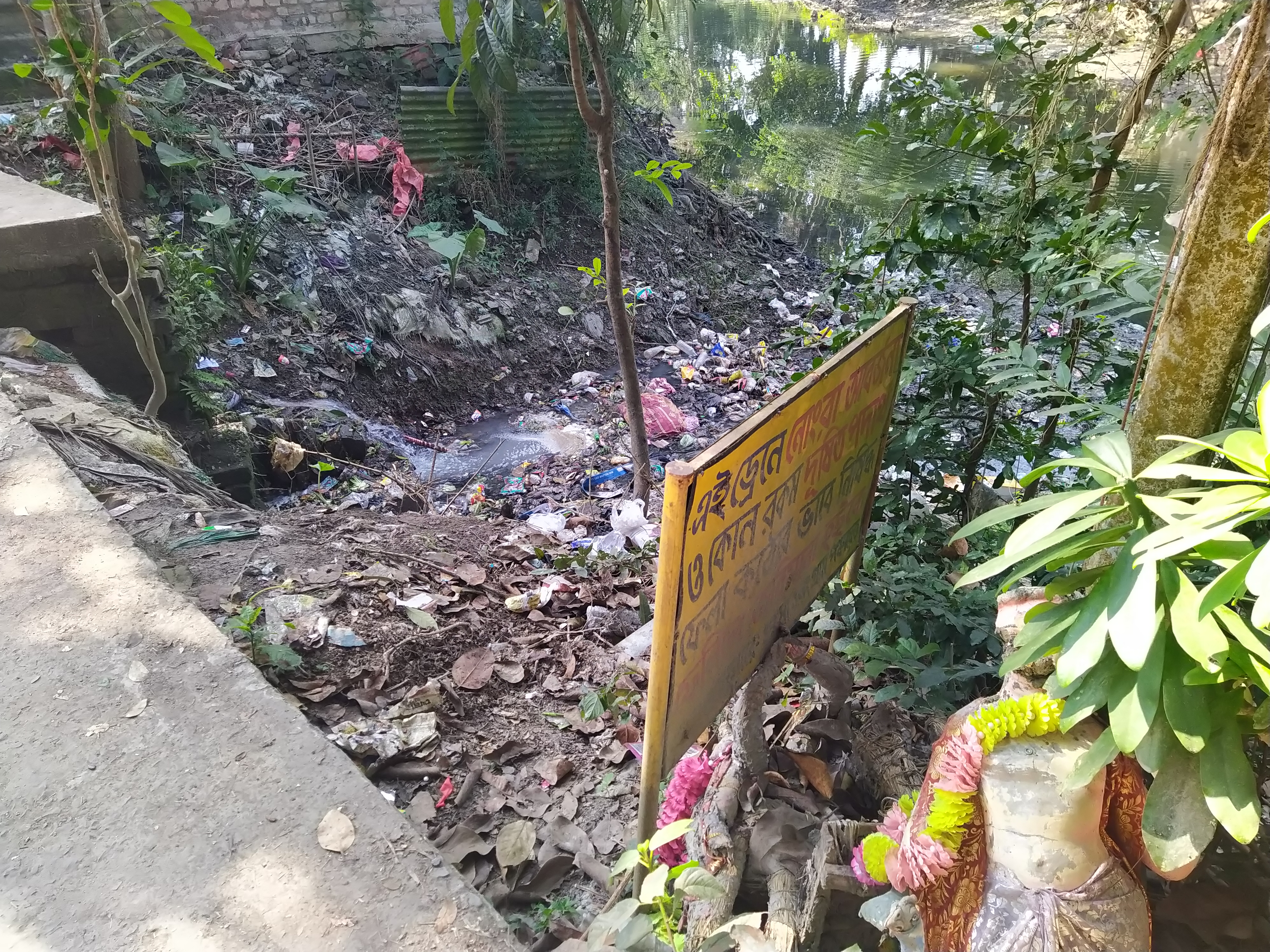
Sewage and polluted solid waste mix up with Bidyadhari River, Guma, India 2022.

==== Water resources ====
According to NASA groundwater declines are highest on Earth between 2002 and 2008 in northern India. Agricultural productivity is dependent on irrigation. A collapse of agricultural output and severe shortages of potable water may influence 114 million residents in India. In July 2012, about 670 million people or 10% of the world population lost power blame on the severe drought restricting the power delivered by hydroelectric dams.

=== Air pollution ===
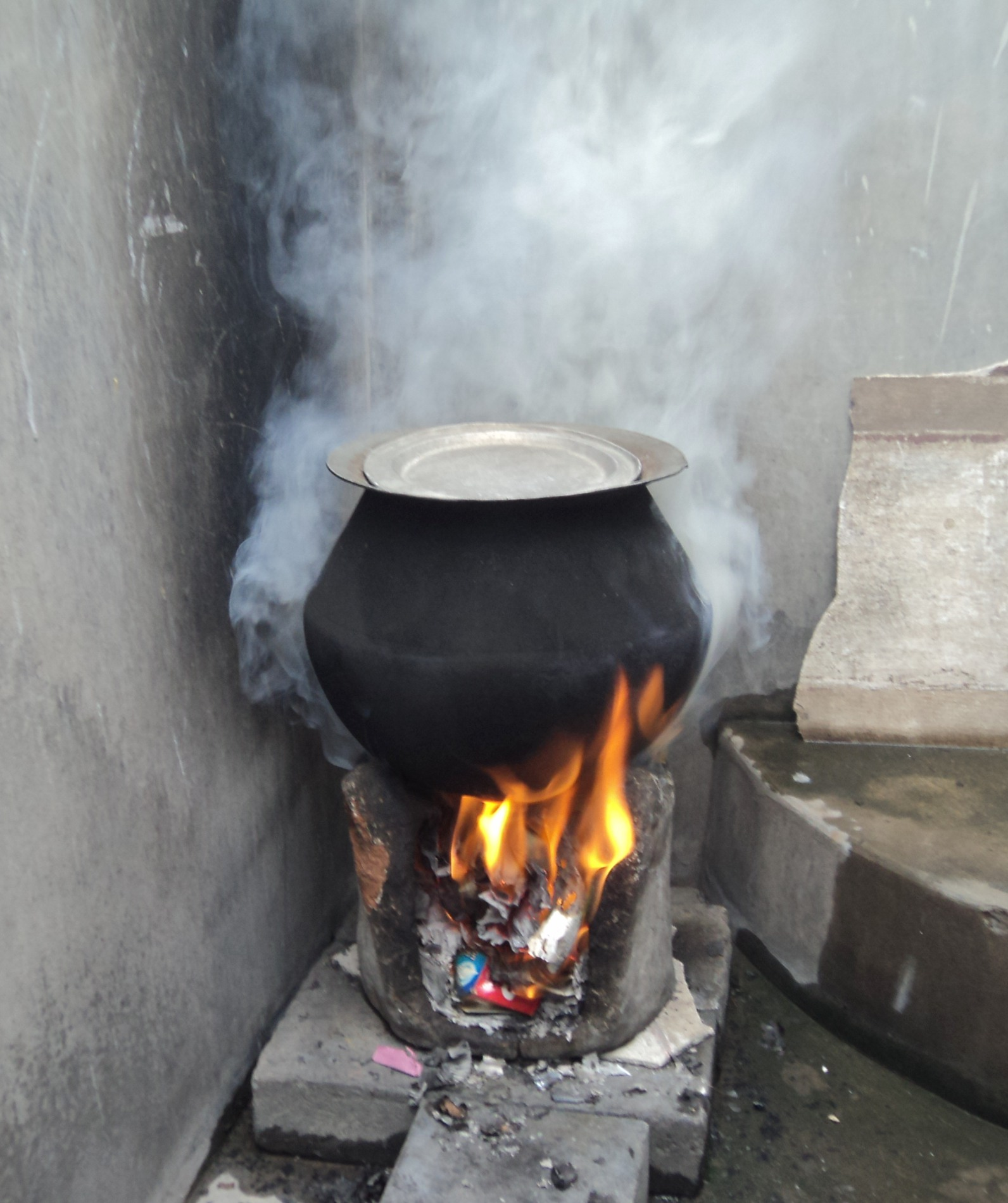
A rural stove using biomass cakes, fuelwood and trash as cooking fuel. Surveys suggest over 100 million households in India use such stoves (chullahs) every day, 2–3 times a day. It is a major source of air pollution in India, and produces smoke and numerous indoor air pollutants at concentrations 5 times higher than coal. Clean burning fuels and electricity are unavailable in rural parts and small towns of India because of limited and deteriorating infrastructure.

Air pollution in India is a serious issue, with the major sources being biomass burning, fuel adulteration, vehicle emission, and traffic congestion. Air pollution is also the main cause of the Asian brown cloud, which has been causing the monsoon season to be delayed. India is the world's largest consumer of fuelwood, agricultural waste, and biomass for energy purposes. Traditional fuel (fuelwood, crop residue and dung cake) dominates domestic energy use in rural India and account for about 90% of the total. In urban areas, traditional fuel constitutes about 24% of the total. Fuel wood, agricultural waste and biomass cake burning release over 165 million tonnes of combustion products every year. These biomass-based household stoves in India are also a leading source of greenhouse emissions, which contribute to climate change.

The annual crop burning practice in northwest India, north India and eastern Pakistan, before and after monsoons, from April and May to October to November, are a major seasonal source of air pollution since the 1980s. Approximately 500 million tons of crop residue are burnt in the open, releasing NOx, SOx, PAHs and particulate matter into the air. This burning has been found to be a leading cause of smog and haze problems through the winter over Punjab, cities such as Delhi, and major population centers along the rivers through West Bengal. In other states of India, rice and wheat crop residue straw burning in open is a major source of air pollution.

Vehicle emissions are another source of air pollution. Vehicle emissions are worsened by fuel adulteration and poor fuel combustion efficiencies from traffic congestion and low density of quality, high speed road network per 1000 people. A lot of this comes from motorbikes. Motorbikes are common in large cities like Delhi, Mumbai, and Kolkata. In order to reduce air pollution effects India is introducing hybrid and electric vehicles as per the Faster Adoption and Manufacturing of Electric vehicles in India scheme. While challenges are slowing down the development cleaner combustion fuels are being use in motor vehicles. As of now Delhi Transport Corporation is the world's largest operator of CNG bus fleet. Many Indian cities are testing out with cleaner fossil fuels mostly CNG fuel and renewable biofuels such as biodiesel and E85 blended petroleum. In June 2020, the supreme court promised that in order to improve emissions from vehicles all BS4 vehicles will be upgraded to BS6 standards.

On per capita basis, India is a small emitter of carbon dioxide greenhouse. In 2009, IEA estimates that it emitted about 1.4 tons of gas per person, in comparison to the United States’ 17 tons per person, and a world average of 5.3 tons per person. However, India was the third largest emitter of total carbon dioxide in 2009 at 1.65 Gt per year, after China (6.9 Gt per year) and the United States (5.2 Gt per year). With 17 percent of world population, India contributed some 5 percent of human-sourced carbon dioxide emission; compared to China's 24 percent share.

The Air (Prevention and Control of Pollution) Act was passed in 1981 to regulate air pollution and there have been some measurable improvements. However, the 2012 Environmental Performance Index ranked India at 177th position out of 180 countries in 2018, as having the poorest relative air quality out of 132 countries. Of the world's 30 most polluted cities, India is home to 21 as of 2020. As per the World Air Quality Report 2024, India ranked 5th among the most polluted countries worldwide. Methodological issues have also arisen while monitoring agricultural stubble burning. During the 2026 harvest season, independent satellite analyzes revealed that approximately 34,000 farm fires occurred throughout Punjab and Haryana through early November—much higher than official counts—because farmers moved burning times to the late afternoon, outside the overpass windows of conventional polar-orbiting satellites.

=== Solid waste pollution ===
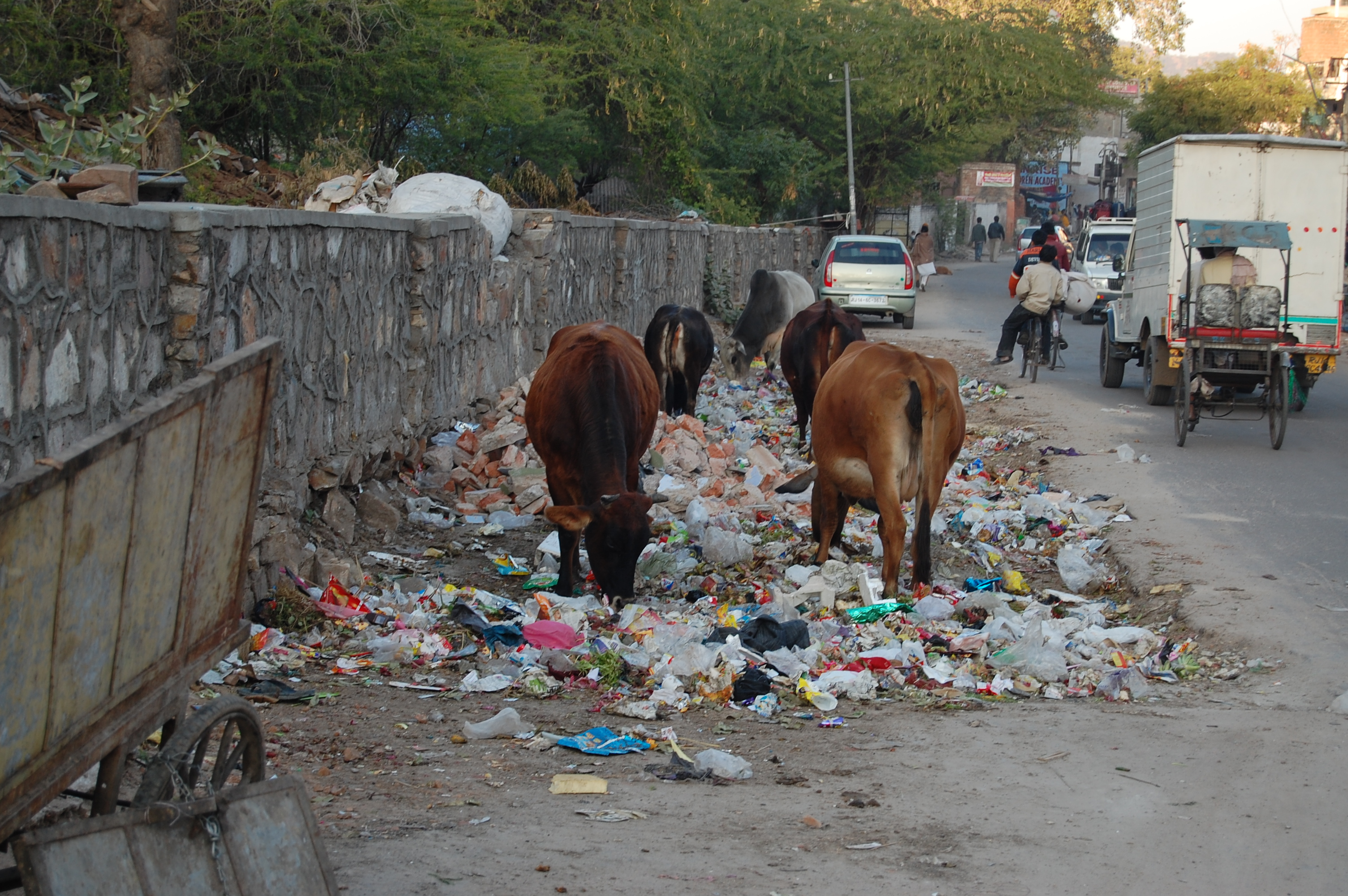
Solid waste pollution along a street in Jaipur. Trash and garbage disposal services, which are the responsibility of local government workers in India, are ineffective. Solid waste is routinely seen along India's streets and shopping plazas.

Trash and garbage are a common sight in urban and rural areas of India and are a major source of pollution. Indian cities alone generate more than 100 million tons of solid waste a year. Street corners are piled with trash. Public places and sidewalks are despoiled with filth and litter, rivers and canals act as garbage dumps. In part, India's garbage crisis is from rising congestion. The tourism regions in the country mainly hill stations are also facing this issue in the recent years.

In 2000, India's Supreme Court directed all Indian cities to implement a comprehensive waste-management programme that would include household collection of segregated waste, recycling and composting. These directions have simply been ignored. No major city runs a comprehensive programme of the kind envisioned by the Supreme Court.

Indeed, forget waste segregation and recycling directive of the India's Supreme Court, the Organisation for Economic Cooperation and Development estimates that up to 40 percent of municipal waste in India remains simply uncollected. Even medical waste, theoretically controlled by stringent rules that require hospitals to operate incinerators, is routinely dumped with regular municipal garbage. A recent study found that about half of India's medical waste is improperly disposed of.

Municipalities in Indian cities and towns have waste collection employees. However, these are unionised government workers and their work performance is neither measured nor monitored.

Some of the few solid waste landfills India has, near its major cities, are overflowing and poorly managed. They have become significant sources of greenhouse emissions and breeding sites for disease vectors such as flies, mosquitoes, cockroaches, rats, and other pests.

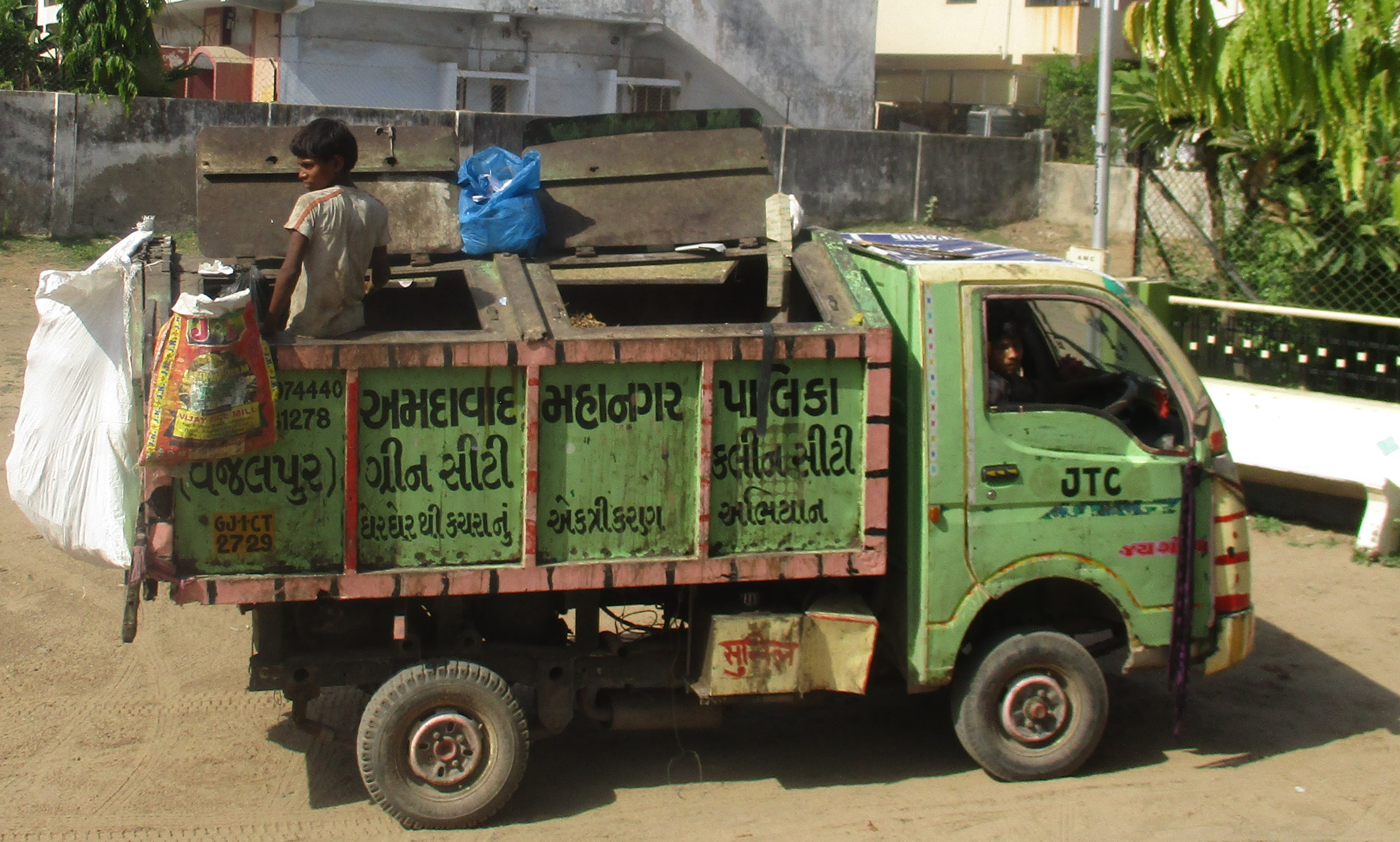
Waste collection truck in Ahmedabad, Gujarat.

In 2011, several Indian cities embarked on waste-to-energy projects of the type in use in Germany, Switzerland and Japan. For example, New Delhi is implementing two incinerator projects aimed at turning the city's trash problem into electricity resource. These plants are being welcomed for addressing the city's chronic problems of excess untreated waste and a shortage of electric power. They are also being welcomed by those who seek to prevent water pollution, hygiene problems, and eliminate rotting trash that produces potent greenhouse gas methane. The projects are being opposed by waste collection workers & local unions who fear changing technology may deprive them of their livelihood and way of life.

In 2019, a garbage cafe opened in Ambikapur, India, in an attempt to tackle plastic pollution and hunger. In the cafe, a person can exchange plastic garbage for a meal.

=== Noise pollution ===
Noise pollution or noise disturbance is the most efficiently changing and disturbing or excessive noise that may harm the activity or balance of human or animal life. The source of most outdoor noise worldwide is mainly caused by machines and transportation systems, motor vehicles, aircraft, and trains. In India the outdoor noise is also caused by loud music during festival seasons. Outdoor noise is summarized by the word environmental noise. Poor urban planning may give rise to noise pollution, since side-by-side industrial and residential buildings can result in noise pollution in the residential areas.

Indoor noise can be caused by machines, building activities, and music performances, especially in some workplaces. Noise-induced hearing loss can be caused by outside (e.g. trains) or inside (e.g. music) noise.

=== Erosion of sands ===
In March 2009, the issue of Punjab attracted press coverage. It was alleged to be caused by fly ash ponds of thermal power stations, which reportedly lead to severe birth defects in children in the Faridkot and Bhatinda districts of Punjab. The news reports claimed the uranium levels were more than 60 times the maximum safe limit. In 2012, the Government of India confirmed that the ground water in Malwa belt of Punjab has uranium metal that is 50% above the trace limits set by the United Nations' World Health Organization. Scientific studies, based on over 1000 samples from various sampling points, could not trace the source to fly ash and any sources from thermal power plants or industry as originally alleged. The study also revealed that the uranium concentration in ground water of Malwa district is not 60 times the WHO limits, but only 50% above the WHO limit in 3 locations. This highest concentration found in samples was less than those found naturally in ground waters currently used for human purposes elsewhere, such as Finland. Research is underway to identify natural or other sources for the uranium.

=== Greenhouse gas emissions ===
India was the third largest emitter of carbon dioxide, a major greenhouse gas, in 2009 at 1.65 Gt per year, after China and the United States. With 17 percent of world population, India contributed some 5 percent of human-sourced carbon dioxide emission; compared to China's 24 percent share. On per capita basis, India emitted about 1.4 tons of carbon dioxide per person, in comparison to the United States’ 17 tons per person, and a world average of 5.3 tons per person.

=== Deforestation ===
India had a 2018 Forest Landscape Integrity Index mean score of 7.09/10, ranking it 58th globally out of 172 countries.

== See also ==
- Ghazipur landfill
- Bhalswa landfill
- Deforestation in India
- Drought in India
- Environmental impact of irrigation
- Water scarcity in India
- Alkali soils
