= Pay as you throw =

Waste management payment model

Pay as you throw (PAYT) (also called trash metering, unit pricing, variable rate pricing, or user-pay) is a usage-pricing model for disposing of municipal solid waste. Users are charged a rate based on how much waste they present for collection to the municipality or local authority.

A variety of models exist depending on the region and municipality. Waste can be measured by weight or size, or by unit counts, identified using different types of bags, tags, containers or even RFID. Services for waste diversion, like recycling and composting, are often provided free of charge where pay-as-you-throw systems are implemented.

There are three main types of pay-as-you-throw programmes: - Full-unit pricing: users pay for all the garbage they want collected in advance by purchasing a tag, custom bag, or selected size container. - Partial-unit pricing: the local authority or municipality decides on a maximum number of bags or containers of garbage, with collection paid for by taxes. Additional bags or containers are available for purchase should the user exceed the permitted amount - Variable-rate pricing: users can choose to rent a container of varying sizes (some programs offer up to five), with the price corresponding to the amount of waste generated.

== Rationale ==
The two most traditional approaches to disposing of municipal solid waste are a flat-rate system or municipal taxes. All users pay the same flat rate or tax regardless of how much waste they present for pickup. Under the flat-rate system there is no incentive to reduce waste produced. When promoting the PAYT scheme, by emphasizing the responsibility for paying for waste produced rather than a flat-rate fee, there is increased public preference for the PAYT scheme.

PAYT is based on two guiding principles of environmental policy: the polluter pays principle and the shared responsibility concept. The rationale for PAYT can be divided into three broad categories:

=== Economic ===
Under a PAYT scheme, some or all of the costs of waste management can be removed from property tax bills, providing more independence in the management and financial of residential waste system. Waste management services are then treated just like other utilities such as electricity or water that are charged by unit of consumption.

=== Environmental ===
The PAYT programs are an effective tool in increasing waste separation, recycling, and waste minimization. The result is significant energy savings from transportation, increases in material recovery from recycling, and reduction in pollution from landfills and incinerators. Therefore, it reduces the load of landfills. Additionally, PAYT programs also indirectly encourage producers to develop more efficient designs and environmentally friendly product life cycles.

=== Social ===
Waste collections costs are distributed more fairly among the population, and in proportion to the amount of waste each user generates. Free riders are no longer able to have their behavior subsidized, and PAYT is said to promote community sustainability. Lower-income families tend to produce less waste and thus pay lower waste collection fees.

== Diversion effects and risks ==
Charging for waste often results in illegal dumping (also known as "fly-tipping") or the waste being passed to unlicensed or illegal disposal methods. Studies have found that unit pricing, which involves charging a set price per bag of garbage thrown out, contribute to illegal dumping. Although the intent of unit pricing is to encourage people to use other forms of waste disposal such as recycling and composting, people often turn to disposing of waste in unauthorized areas to save money. Municipalities in Massachusetts have typically observed a reduction in trash larger than the increase in recycling, but this is believed to be due to people formerly bringing in trash from other communities (where presumably there is no free pickup) to the homes of friends and relatives.

The bin/container method and tag/sticker method can also be at risk of theft.

== Political opposition ==
When there is a change to any established municipal service, public resistance is common. The Massachusetts Department of Environmental Protection recommends making PAYT programs revenue-neutral by reducing taxes at the same time as introducing trash fees so residents don't see the latter as a new cost.

== Implementation ==
Urban communities usually offer curbside collection while rural communities provide drop-off collection service. Both the European Union and the US Environmental Protection Agency have published handbooks for introducing PAYT.

=== North America ===
PAYT programs operated in California, Michigan, New York and Washington as early as the 1970s, although The City of San Francisco "had practiced a kind of PAYT scheme since 1932." By 2000, 6,000 communities in the U.S. (20%) and 200 in Canada had implemented user fees for waste management. In 2002 North Americans disposed of 24 million tonnes of waste, with residential sources accounting for 9.5 million tonnes. PAYT programs resulted in residential waste declining from 9 - 38% and increased recycling from 6 – 40%.

=== Europe ===
Austria was the first country to implement individual waste charging in 1945, but PAYT did not catch on until the 1980s when efficient and secure systems became available to account for usage of disposal services electronically. The first city in Europe to implement an electronic identification and billing system for waste charges was Dresden, Germany, in 2004. The first experience in Spain was in 2003. Since 1991, the European Waste Policy has required that "part of the costs not covered by revenues from material reuse must be recovered on the polluter-pays principle." Versions of PAYT are present in municipalities all over Europe.

For example, a study conducted in Ferrara, Italy discovered that the implementation of the PAYT policy lead to a 30% overall reduction in waste production. Furthermore accompanying this, it was discovered that there was also a 40% increase in recycling uptake. This overall waste reduction resulted in overall cost savings of approximately 3.6 million euros within the municipality of Ferrara.

=== Asia ===
After being introduced in the 1970s, 954 municipalities (30%) in Japan have implemented PAYT programs. The city of Taipei currently runs a scheme where households and companies purchase specially printed blue bin bags, and place waste in it. The municipal waste management department collects only rubbish placed within these special bags. Called the "Per Bag Trash Collection Fee", this scheme encourages usage of recyclable packaging, as those do not need a special bag and are disposed free of charge. As a result, Taipei's waste volume is down 35.08%, and recycling has increased 2.6-fold from 1999. PAYT is also implemented in Korea, Thailand, Vietnam, China, and Republic of China (Taiwan). Starting in April 2024, Hong Kong will implement its PAYT programme.

PAYT pricing has also been recently introduced in parts of Bangalore through the wastepicker cooperative Hasiru Dala, founded by Nalini Shekar. The organization followed the 2-bin 1-bag segregation method, and charged differently for compost-able waste and landfill rejects, while paying for recyclables. Apartments serviced through this pricing mechanism showed a significant reduction in their garbage footprint.

In rural China, the Rural Revitalization PAYT Strategy, launched in 2018, has been found to improve farmers' living standards, incomes, and quality of life. The policy adapts methods used in cities so they better fit rural areas, rather than copying them directly. However, because participation is voluntary and there are no strict penalties for non-compliance, its overall impact is limited.

== See also ==
- Waste management law
- Polluter pays principle
