= Okhla landfill =

Landfill in Delhi, India

Coordinates: 28.512°N 77.283°E

Okhla landfill is a dumping ground in Okhla, Delhi. Spread across an area of 40 acres, the site was commissioned in 1996 for the use of South Delhi Municipal Corporation (SDMC). Of the 3,500 tonnes of waste collected by SDMC everyday, 1,200 tonnes were being dumped in the Okhla Landfill despite the site was declared exhausted in 2010. After reaching a height of 55 meters, thrice the permissible limit, the site was finally decommissioned in 2018. The civic agency now aims to complete the remediation of the Okhla landfill within one-and-a-half years to convert it into a green cover.

In 2025, the Municipal Corporation of Delhi (MCD) authorities have set a target to clear and flatten the Okhla landfill by July 2026 as part of a broader plan to eliminate major landfill mounds in the city and reclaim them for future use. The MCD has been conducting biomining and scientific waste-processing operations at Okhla, inckuding other sites such as Bhalswa and Ghazipur, and has invited proposals for the reuse of reclaimed landfill land for greener, sustainable developments for when the cleanup is completed. Administrative oversight and periodic inspections by the municipal officials aim to maintain progress and ensure that the July 2026 deadline is met, while consultations continue to identify additional sites for diverting fresh waste to accelerate legacy-waste removal.

== See also ==
- Bhalswa landfill
- Mavallipura
