= Waste management in India =

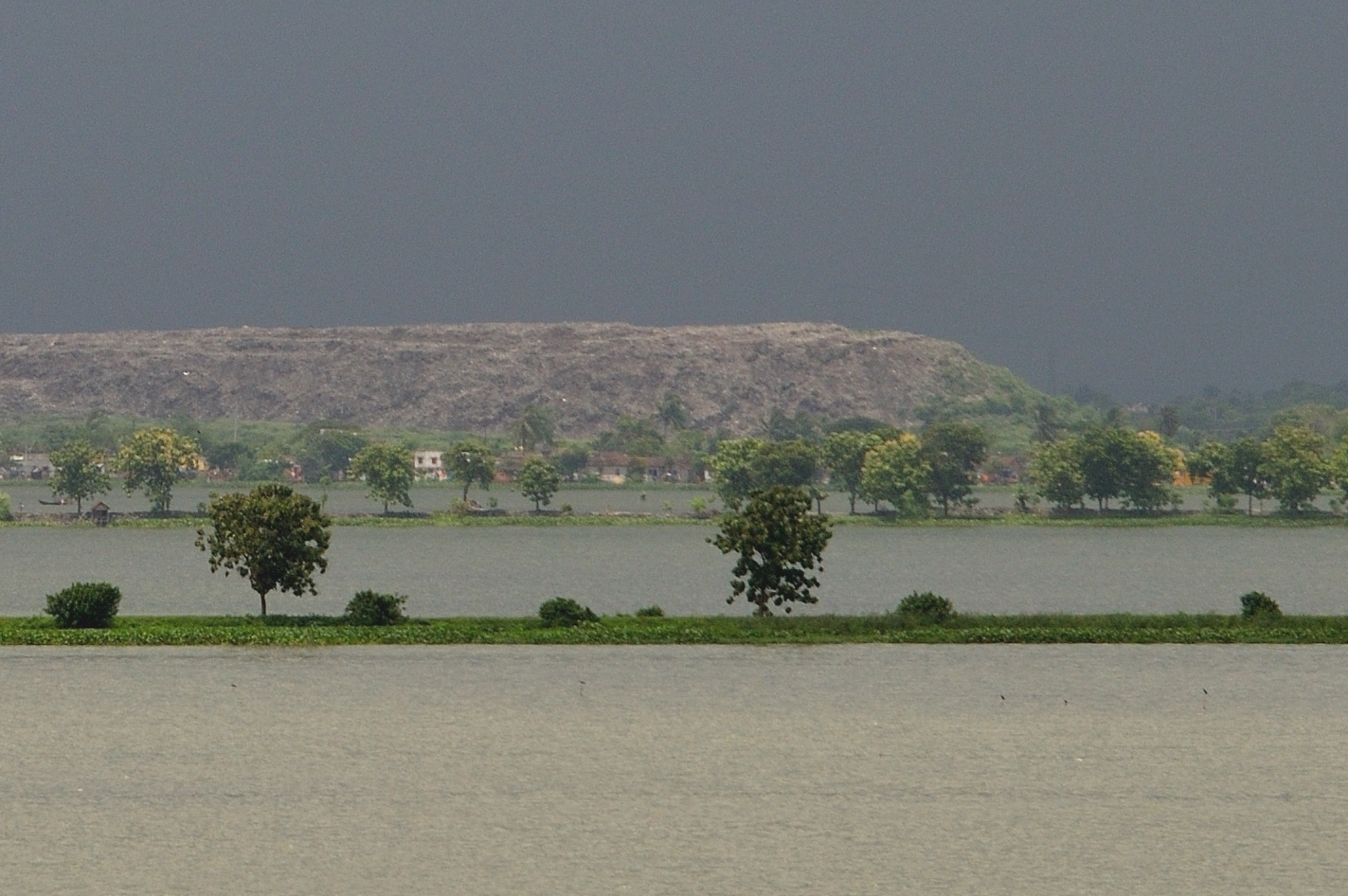
Solid Waste Disposal Ground in Kolkata

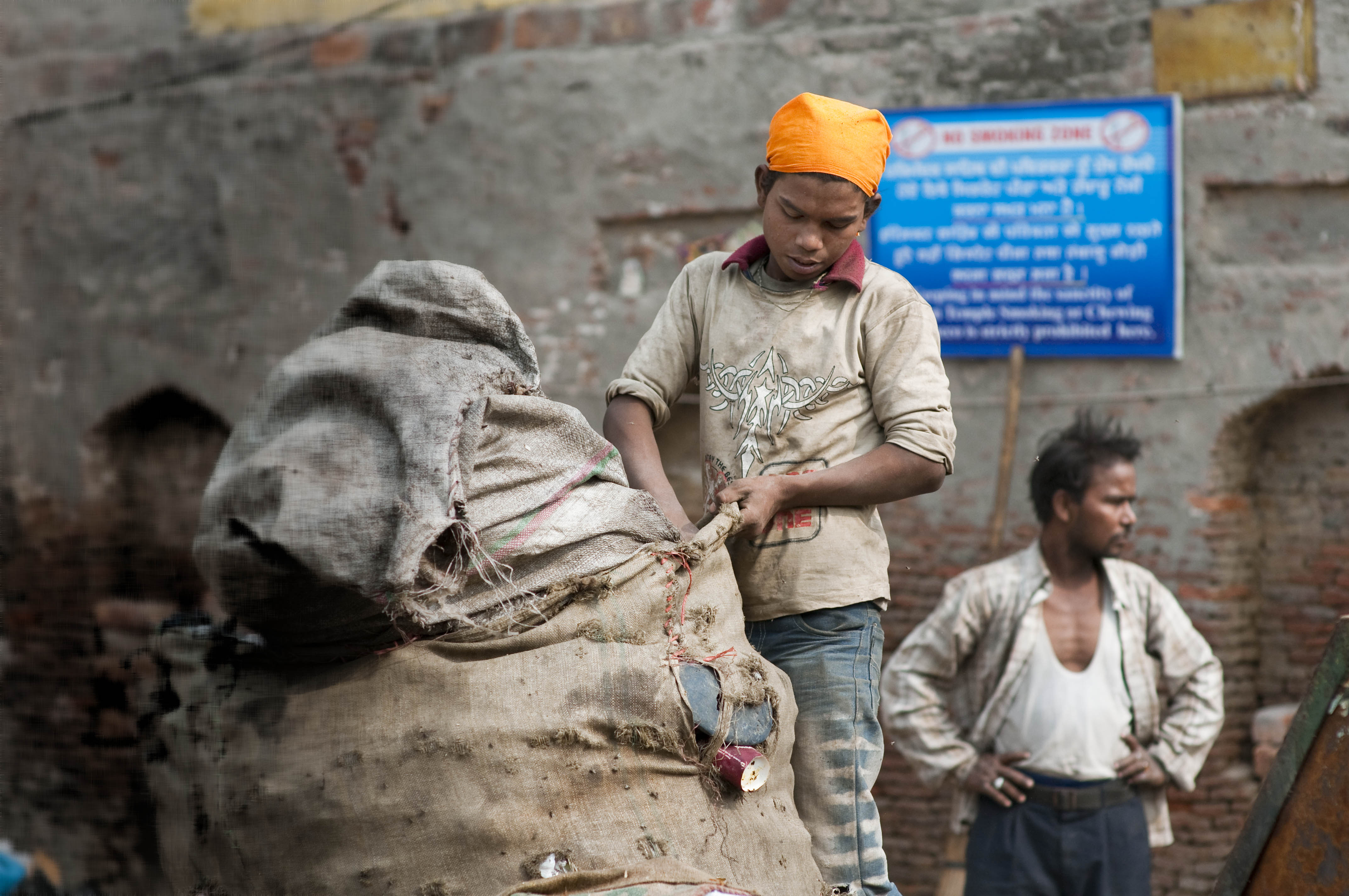
India relies on large scale landfills and the informal sector to help address its growing waste management challenges

Waste management in India falls under the purview of the Union Ministry of Environment, Forest and Climate Change (MoEF&CC). In 2016, this ministry released the Solid Wastage Management (SWM) Rules, which replaced by the Municipal Solid Waste (Management and Handling) Rules, and 2000 of which had been in place for 16 years. This national policy plays a significant role in the acknowledgment and inclusion of the informal sector (waste pickers) into the waste management process for the first time.

India generates 62 million tonnes (61,000,000 long tons; 68,000,000 short tons) of waste each year. About 43 million tonnes (70%) are collected, of which about 12 million tonnes are treated, and 31 million tonnes are dumped in landfill sites.

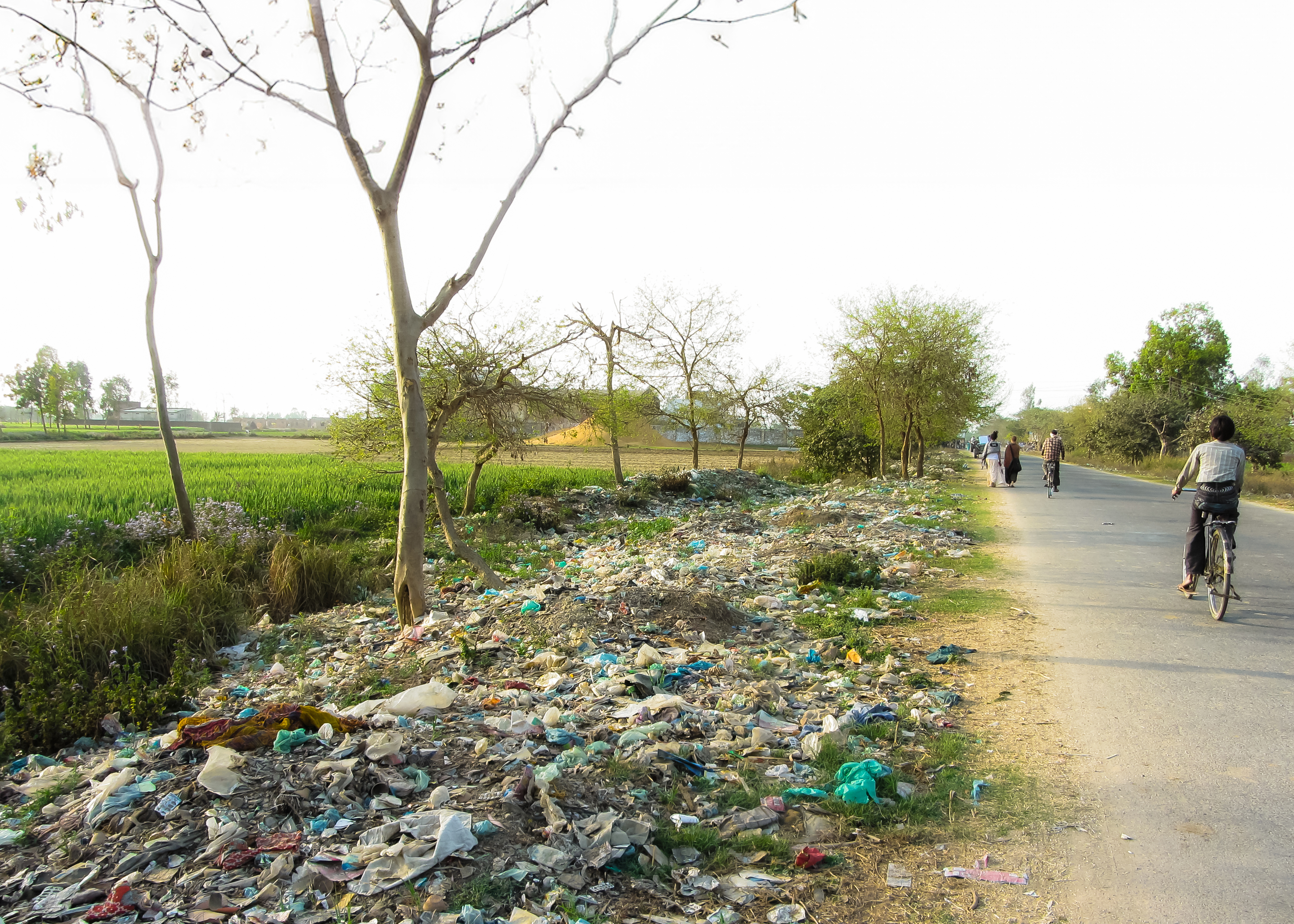
Farmland in Uttar Pradesh polluted by littering

With changing consumption patterns and rapid economic growth, it is estimated that urban municipal solid waste generation will increase to 165 million tonnes in 2030.

== Littering Culture ==
Littering remains a deeply entrenched challenge in India. The country produces roughly 65 million tonnes of waste annually, yet about 80% goes unrecycled or untreated, with much of it ending up in open dumps or overflowing landfills. According to government data presented in India's parliament, approximately 40% of plastic waste remains uncollected and ends up littered on streets. The problem has deep historical roots, traditional biodegradable materials like leaves and clay have been replaced by non-biodegradable plastics due to rapid urbanization and industrialization, while waste management infrastructure and public awareness have failed to keep pace. The consequences are far-reaching: plastic waste clogs urban drainage systems and contributes to flooding, while an estimated 80% of marine litter along India's coastlines consists of plastic.

== Household waste generation and composition ==
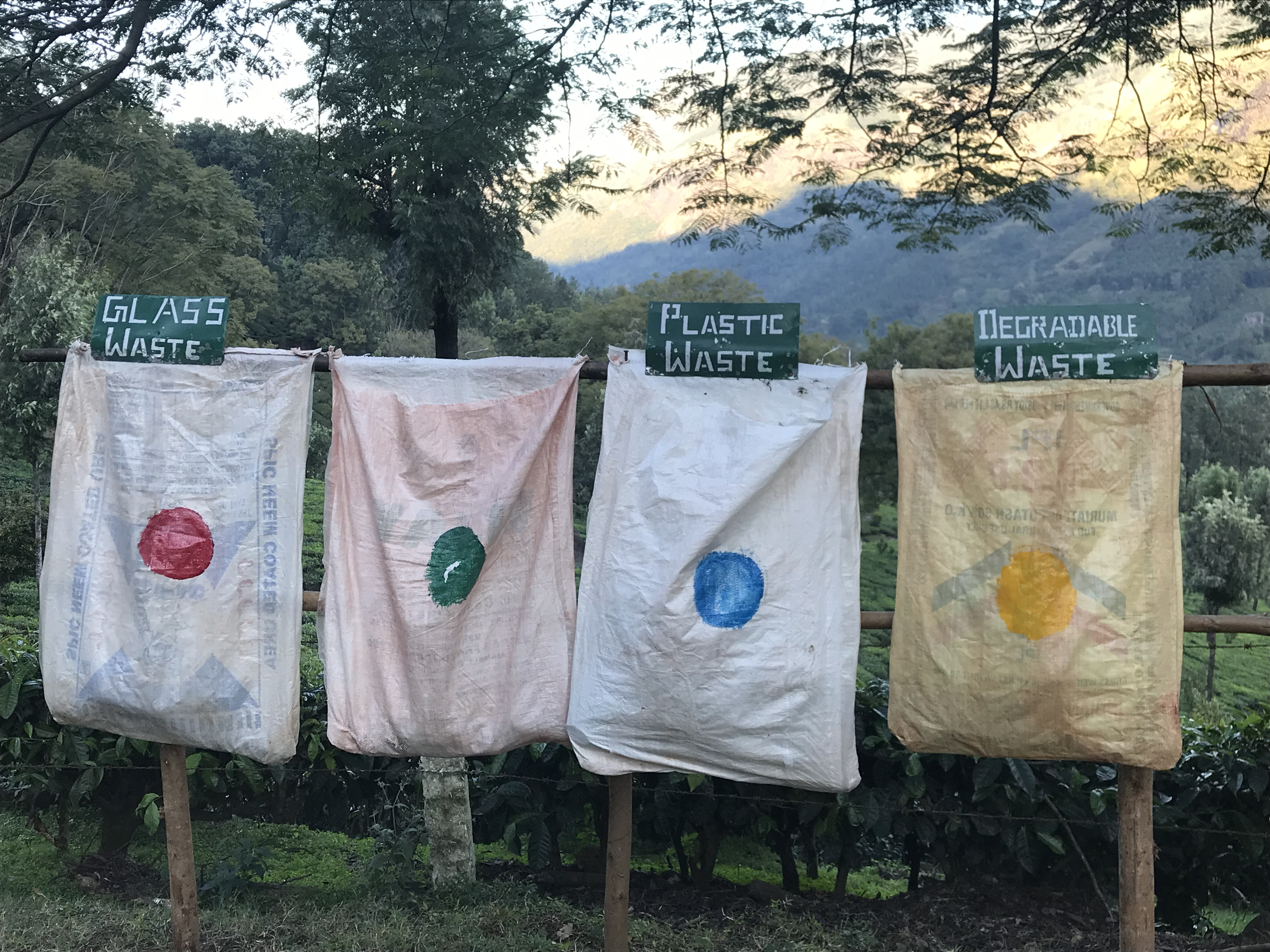
Small-town waste separation initiative in Idukki District, Kerala

Despite development in social, economic and environmental areas, SWM systems in India have remained relatively unchanged. The informal sector has a key role in extracting value from waste, with approximately 90% of residual waste currently dumped rather than properly landfilled. There is an urgent need to move to more sustainable SWM, which requires new management systems and waste management facilities. Current SWM systems are inefficient, with waste having a negative impact on public health, the environment, and the economy. The Waste Management and Handling Rules in India were introduced by the Ministry of Environment and Forests (MoEF), yet, compliance is variable and limited.

== E-waste in India ==
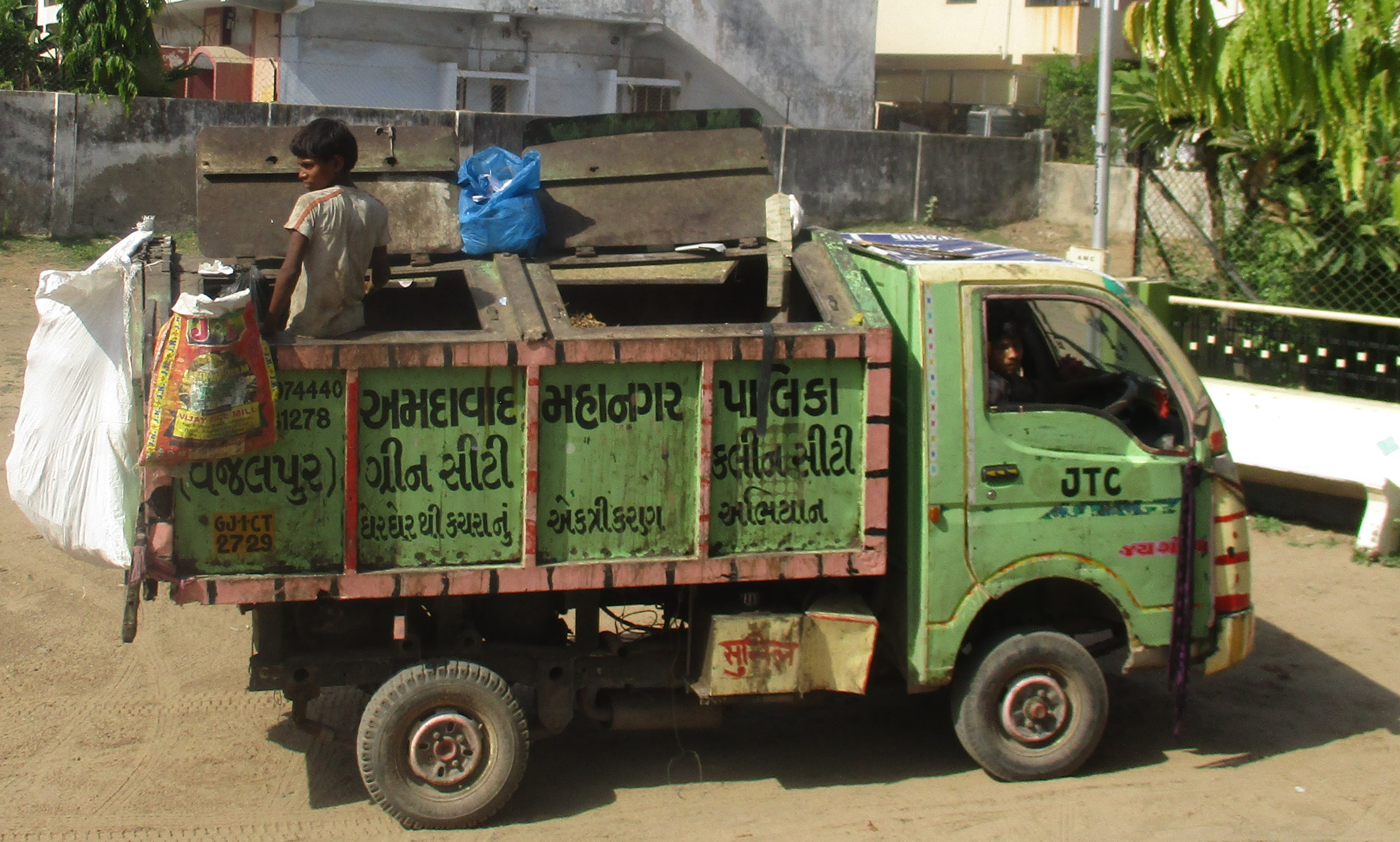
Waste collection truck in Ahmedabad, Gujarat

The global e-waste monitor, a collaboration between the International Telecommunication Union (ITU) and the United Nations University, estimated that India generated 1.975 million tonnes of e-waste in 2016 or approximately 1.5 kg of e-waste per capita.

The Associated Chambers of Commerce and Industry (ASSOCHAM) stated rapid economic growth and changing consumer behaviour was likely to increase e-waste generation in India to 5.2 million tonnes per year by 2020.

== Solid Waste Management Rules ==
Solid Waste Management Rules were inaugurated in 2016. Highlights include:

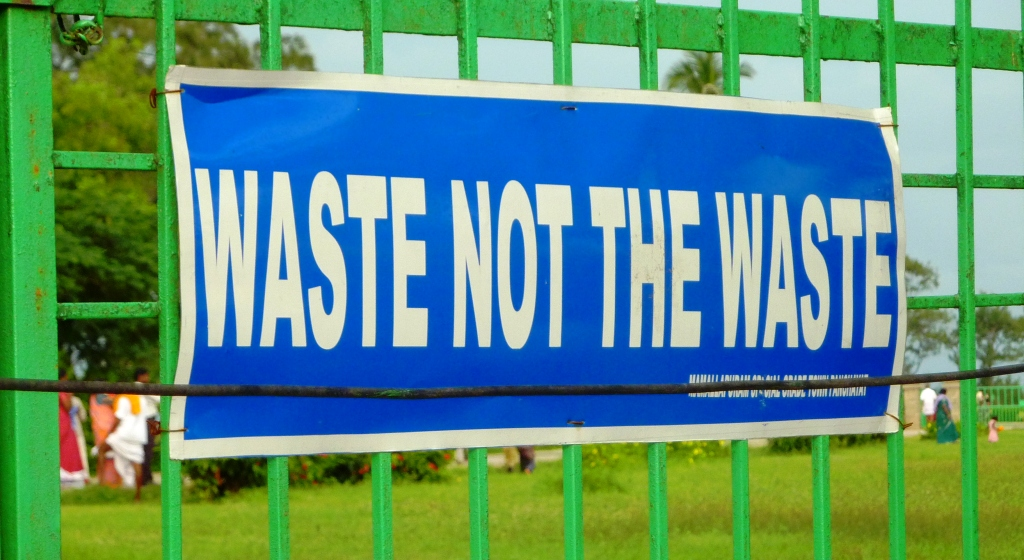
Waste not the Waste - sign. Mahabalipuram, Tamil Nadu

- Waste segregation at source is mandatory. Households are required to separate waste into three streams – Organic or biodegradable waste, dry waste (such as plastic, paper, metal, and wood), and domestic hazardous waste (diapers, napkins, mosquito repellents, cleaning agents). Further, bulk waste generators such as hotels and hospitals are expected to treat organic waste either onsite or by collaborating with the urban local body.
- Municipalities and urban local bodies have been directed to include informal waste pickers and rag pickers into their waste management process. This is the first time that national policy has acknowledged and included the informal sector into the waste management process. India has over 1.5 million subsistence informal waste pickers and including them into the formal waste management system represents an opportunity for urban local bodies to streamline their operations, while provide the waste pickers with better income opportunities.
- Manufacturers of fast-moving consumer goods FMCG that use non-biodegradable packaging are required to put in place a system to collect the packaging waste generated due to their production.
- Urban local bodies have been given a provision to charge bulk generators a user fee to collect and process their waste. Additionally, spot fines may be levied on people burning garbage or discarding it in public places.
- No non-recyclable waste having a calorific value of 1,500 Kcal/kg or more is permitted in landfills. These wastes should either be utilized for generating energy or for preparing refuse derived fuel. It may also be used for co-processing in cement or thermal power plants.

== City-based initiatives ==
In 2014 India inaugurated the Swachh Bharat Mission, a five-year nationwide cleanup effort. Before this national consolidated effort for systematic and total waste management came into common consciousness, many cities and towns in India had already launched individual efforts directed at municipal waste collection of segregated waste, either based on citizen activism and/or municipal efforts to set up sustainable systems.

Some examples are Swach based in Pune (formed in 1993), Clean Cities Championship in Warangal, Nirmal Bhavanam, Nirmal Nagaram or Clean Homes, Clean City in Alappuzha, Engage 14 campaign in Gangtok, Zero Waste in Bobbili, Andhra Pradesh, Waste Management in Mysore and Solid Waste Management Round Table, Bangalore (formed in 2009). Bangalore's Bruhat Bangalore Mahanagara Palike was directed by the High Court of Karnataka to implement mandatory segregation of municipal waste at the household level before collection – a first for the country. It is a representation of citizen-based activism at a local level, and the litigation was led by notable activists such as Almitra Patel and Nalini Shekar. Following this High Court ruling, other cities in India have followed suit to make segregation of municipal waste mandatory at the generator level, Mumbai, in typical. As per the Swachh Survekshan 2020 (Clean Survey, released in August, 2020) of the Govt. of India, the order of top 20 cleanest cities, with name of the respective state in parentheses, in India are as follows: 1. Indore (Madhya Pradesh) for the fourth consecutive year, 2. Surat (Gujarat), 3. Navi Mumbai (Maharashtra), 4. Ambikapur (Chhattisgarh), 5. Mysuru (Karnataka), 6. Vijayawada (Andhra Pradesh), 7. Ahmedabad (Gujarat), 8. New Delhi (Delhi), 9. Chandrapur (Maharashtra), 10. Khargone (Madhya Pradesh), 11. Rajkot (Gujarat), 12. Tirupati (Andhra Pradesh), 13. Jamshedpur (Jharkhand), 14. Bhopal (Madhya Pradesh), 15. Gandhinagar (Gujarat), 16. Chandigarh (Union Territory), 17. Bilaspur (Chhattisgarh), 18. Ujjain (Madhya Pradesh), 19. Nashik (Maharashtra) and 20. Raigarh (Chhattisgarh).

State	City	Initiative Name	Implementing Agency
Ladakh (UT)	Leh	Project Tsangda	Rural Development Department
Chhattisgarh	Durg	-	Municipal Corporation
Chhattisgarh	Ambikapur	-	Municipal Corporation
Karnataka	Mysuru	-	City Corporation
Maharashtra	Navi Mumbai	-	Navi Mumbai Municipal Corporation
Andhra Pradesh	Visakhapatnam	-	Municipal Corporation
Karnataka	Bengaluru	-	Bruhat Bengaluru Mahanagara Palike
Madhya Pradesh	Indore	-	Indore Municipal Corporation
Maharashtra	Pune	-	Pune Municipal Corporation
Karnataka	Bengaluru	Bettahalasur Project	TAICT
Tamil Nadu	Madurai	T Kallupatti	Town panchayat
West Bengal	Kolkata	Kolkata Solid Waste Management Improvement Project	Kolkata Metropolitan Development Authority

== Information technology (IT) initiatives ==
MoEFCC launched a web based application in 2016 to track and monitor waste management in India. The application, Integrated Waste Management System, collects information and assists in coordinating waste generators, recyclers, operators of disposal facilities and state agencies.

== Public-private partnership initiatives ==
Public-private partnerships (PPP) have been promoted by the Government of India for improving waste management services, yet, have remained problematic. The challenges of improving solid waste management services in India are caused by lack of financial resources, lack of appropriate skills and technological competencies with the public sector. Governments have started to explore PPPs as an alternative. The progress and improvement achieved remained low. Research on this has suggested recommendations in accordance with some issues uncovered. For example, PPP in MSW is considered immature, yet, high pre-qualification requirements were established. The urban local bodies (ULBs) found difficulties in defining an appropriate scope for some PPP projects. The specific issue encounters include a dire need of services are the primary reason behind opting for PPP mode; the perception that PPP gives greater benefit to the public; third and interconnected: PPPs avoid financial stress on the public sector; and fourth, PPPs are thought to constrain transaction costs and give value for the money invested. The research also revealed some serious negative issues that have crept-in while using PPP mode. They are often procured in an incompetent manner, and as opposed to the expectation, they have resulted in high transaction costs and ineffective projects. The private sector appeared to be exploiting the sector without any beneficial projects.

== See also ==
- Environment of India
- Ghazipur landfill
- Bhalswa landfill
- Pirana Landfill
- Bandhwari Landfill
