= Almitra Patel =

Indian environmental activist

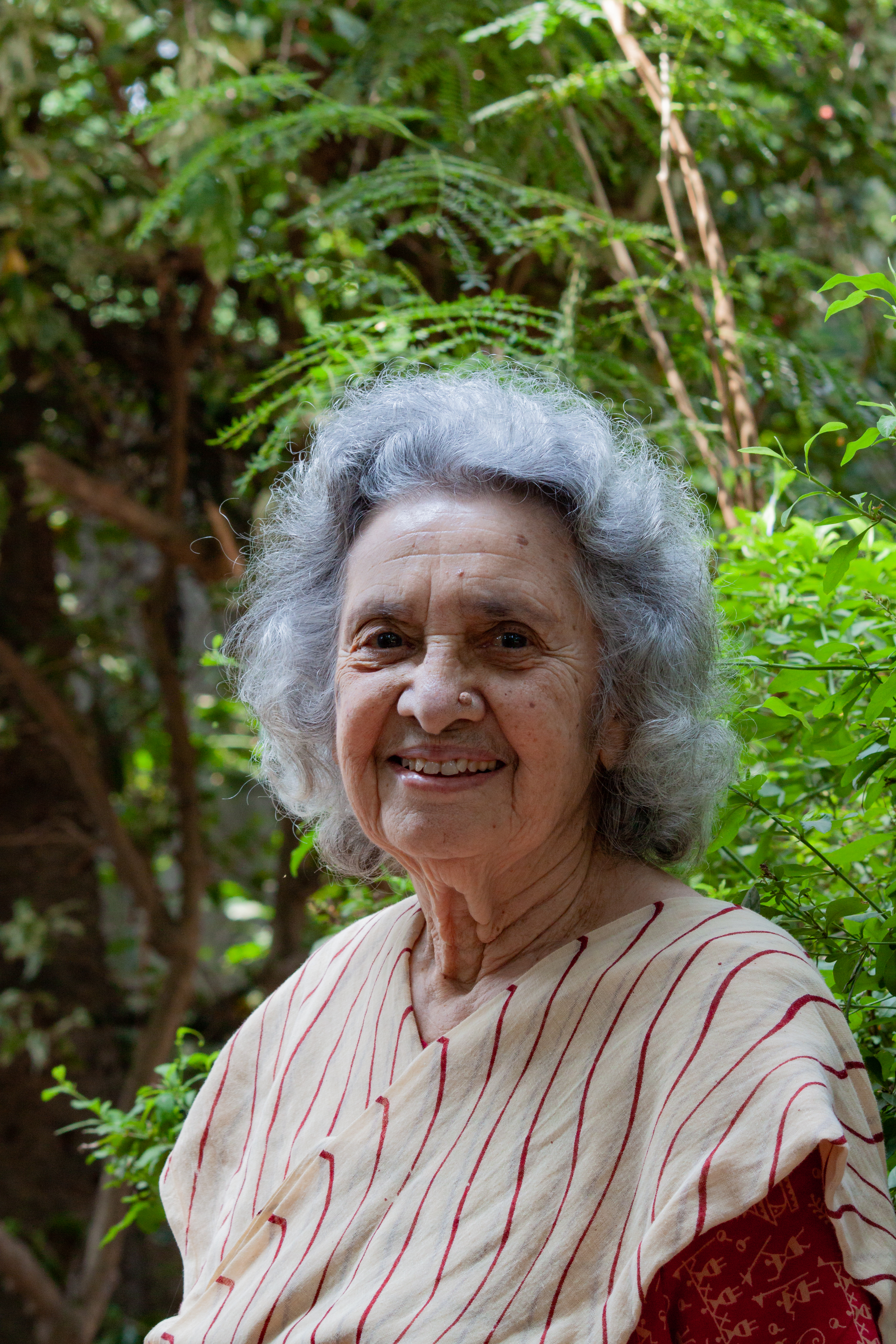
- Almitra Patel in 2021
- Born: 1936 (age 89–90)
- Education: Bombay University; Massachusetts Institute of Technology, USA
- Known for: Environmental and anti-pollution activism

Almitra Patel (born 1935) is an Indian environmental policy advocate and anti-pollution activist.

== Early life and education ==
Almitra's father was a businessman and her mother a civic activist, involved with an education society she had founded. Almitra’s was surrounded by science from an early age, and along with her cousin was the first girl to study science at Barnes High School.

Her father wanted her to study engineering, so he sent his daughter to the Massachusetts Institute of Technology (MIT) to pursue higher studies in ceramics. She finished her BSc in General Engineering and MS in Ceramics in three years, and in 1959 she became the first Indian woman engineer to graduate from MIT. Over the next three decades, she worked in the fields of abrasives, foundry-refractories and cement tile industries.

== Advocacy and activism ==
From the 1970s Almitra was also involved in civic and environmental issues, including saving the Asiatic Lions, being a tree warden, saving Ulsoor Lake, solid waste management, and building low cost homes. Almitra went on to become active in environmental policy advocacy. She is currently engaged in solid waste management issues in various think tanks and government panels.

In 1991, Almitra set out to find a solution for hygienic municipal solid waste management, and found that most of the 80 Indian cities she visited in 1994-1995 had nowhere to dump their waste except in the outskirts of the city or approach roads.

Almitra Patel's landmark 1996 Public Interest Litigation in the Supreme Court against the open dumping of municipal solid waste was instrumental in the drafting of the Municipal Solid Waste Management Rules.

She conducted a study on the Ghazipur landfill.
