= Deonar dumping ground =

Landfill site in Mumbai, India

Coordinates: 19.0671°N 72.9197°E

The Deonar dumping ground is a waste dumping ground or landfill in the city of Mumbai. Located in Shivaji Nagar, an eastern suburb of the city, it is India's oldest and largest dumping ground, set up in 1927. The dumping ground is managed by the city's civic body, Brihanmumbai Municipal Corporation (also known as Municipal Corporation of Greater Mumbai), which also manages two other dumping grounds in the city; one in the neighbourhood of Mulund and one recently opened in Kanjurmarg.

The Brihanmumbai Municipal Corporation (BMC) on 6 August, 2022 moved a proposal before the state environment department seeking environment clearance for its proposed waste-to-energy (WTE) plant at the Deonar dumping ground. The BMC's proposal has been accepted by the state environment impact assessment authority (SEIAA) and is currently under examination by the state-level expert appraisal committee (EAC). As of December 2024, the plant is under construction and is expected to come online by October 2025. Earlier, it had a planned installed capacity was 4 MWe. But later it was increased to 7 MWe. It is expected to burn 1600 tons of MSW. The BMC is to buy the power from the plant.

== Geography ==
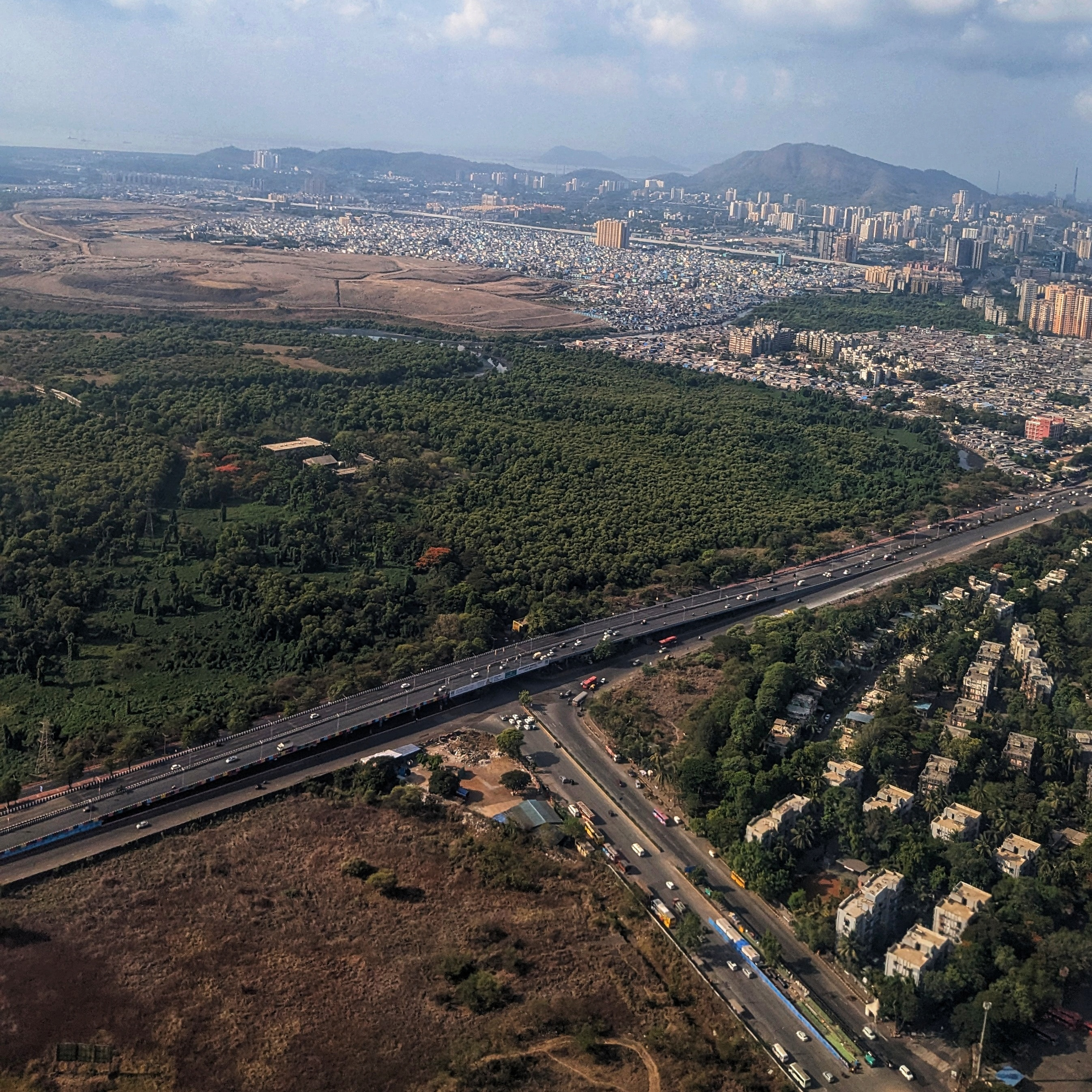
Deonar dumping ground seen behind the Eastern Express Highway.

The dumping ground extends over 311 hectares and receives 5,500 metric tonnes of waste, 600 metric tonnes of silt and 25 tonnes of bio-medical waste daily. Between March and June the daily amount of silt rises to more than 9,000 metric tonnes because of drain cleaning in advance of the monsoon season.

The dump rises to around 114 ft. high. However, in February 2012, Municipal Corporation of Greater Mumbai sought permission from the Airport Authority of India (AAI) to increase this to around 164 ft. As of December 2014, the waste had reached the height of an 18-storeyed tower.

There is another old dumping ground in Mulund in the north-eastern part of the city, where about 2,000 metric tonnes of garbage are dumped daily. In March 2015, a new dumping site was opened in the city by the city's civic body in Kanjurmarg which happens to be the first dumping site which is processed scientifically.

== Health issues ==
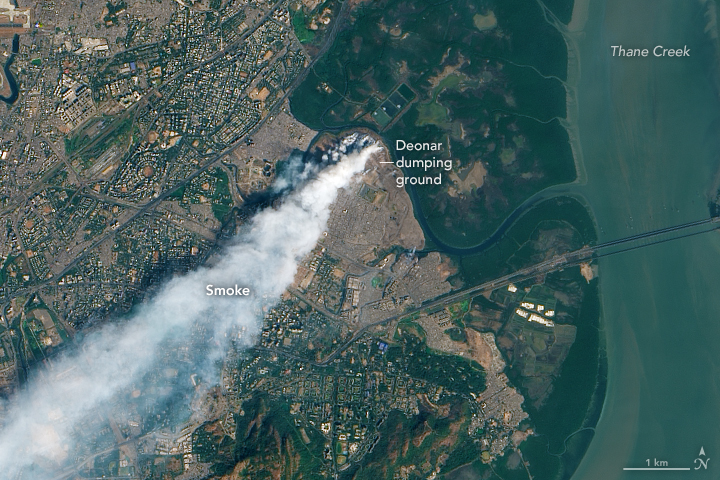
NASA Image: Smoke from the fire which broke out on 28 Jan 2016 at the Deonar dumping ground, Mumbai

The Deonar dumping ground has caused health issues for the residents from Mumbai's neighbourhood of Chembur, Govandi and Mankhurd. Recurrent fires at the dump have caused conditions unfit for habitation for residents of the adjacent area. In 2008, around 40 residents of Chembur went on a hunger strike to protest against the frequent fires and smoke. Again in 2012, Chembur residents complained to the Municipal Corporation of Greater Mumbai about the smoke coming out of the dumping ground, which has been affecting asthma patients. In 2015, neighbourhood surrounding to the dumping ground was identified as the city's most polluted area. Another fire broke out at the Deonar dumping ground in January 2016 causing the Brihanmumbai Municipal Corporation (BMC) to shut down 74 schools run by it for two days, as the smoke from the ground veiled the area causing breathing difficulties.

Infant mortality has also been a concern in the nearby areas; as the rate stands at 60-80 per 1000 live births, which is double the average of 35.2 for the entire city.

== Potential closure ==
In August 2008, it was reported that after receiving complaints from and pollution from the dump, the Brihanmumbai Municipal Corporation (BMC) had decided to close down a section of the dumping ground and use it to generate 7 to 8 MW of power by methane extraction, adding ₹400 million (US$4.7 million) to BMC's revenue. A few months later, BMC granted a contract for the scientific partial closure of the dumping ground for ₹7.04 billion (US$83 million). Partial closing was to take place in two phases, 65 hectares in the first phase, and in the second phase construction of a processing plant and sanitary landfill on the remaining 55 hectares.

Saumya Roy's book "Mountain Tales: Love and Loss in the Municipality of Castaway Belongings" provides a picture of some of the people whose lives and work are focused on the Deonar dump and it relates some of the attempts which have been made to close the site.

== See also ==
- Bhalswa landfill
