= Nalini Shekar =

Indian social activist and entrepreneur (born 1964)

Nalini Shekar (born 1964) is an Indian social activist and entrepreneur who co-founded Hasiru Dala (Green Force), a non-profit helping marginalised waste pickers in Bengaluru, India, become recognised for their work and developing a more sustainable waste management system in the city.

== Education and early years ==
Shekar was born and brought up in Bengaluru. She spent 23 years of her life in the United States of America and Maharashtra.

She worked extensively on the issue of violence against women and children in the United States. She supported the facilitation passage of legislation to support victims of human trafficking in California. For immigrant women affected by domestic violence, Nalini ran a shelter in the past.

She also co-founded Kagad, Kach Kashtakari Panchayat (KKPKP), union of waste pickers in Pune in 1997.

== Hasiru Dala ==
Nalini returned to Bengaluru in 2010, intending to retire. But a growing waste issue, and the plight of the waste pickers of the city, led her and a group of activists to form Hasiru Dala.

Hasiru Dala since its formation, has generated more than 540 new jobs and has helped organise 9,500 waste pickers to work in 175 residential societies and office buildings. The NGO has successfully managed to get these marginalised waste pickers government recognised occupational identity cards and other loan and health facilities, giving them legitimacy. In 2015, the NGO also splintered into Hasiru Dala Innovations which has helped in creating new and long lasting livelihood options for the waste pickers. Today, Hasiru Dala has waste-pickers representing the larger goal in workshops abroad. One of the waste pickers from Bengaluru represented the organisation in a UN conference in Paris. Hasiru Dala is a pioneer in integrating waste workers and waste management in India

Nalini says that she imagines a future where waste pickers become experienced entrepreneurs, dry waste collectors and managing Bio-gas generators, in every corner of Bengaluru. Hasiru Dala currently operates in Mysore, Managlore, Tumkur, Coorg, Rajamudry, Chikkaballapura, Chamrajnagar, Davangere, Hubli, Dharwad, Nanjangud, Sira, Trichy, Coimbatore, besides Bangalore. The organisation has been successful in establishing an inclusive model of waste management in Bangalore which tenders to the needs of residents and ensures that waste does not end up in the landfills

== Career highlights ==
- Received Bangalore city's Kempe Gowda award in 2014
- Was awarded prestigious Namma Bengalure Award in 2020
- Received an award from Santa Clara County Human Relations Commission
- Was honoured by San Jose City Government for her work with immigrants
- Received certificate of Honour from Governor of California, Arnold Schwarzenegger
- Star award from Asian Community in the San Francisco Bay Area

She has won many accolades for her work, including the Kempegowda Award 2015, from the City of Bangalore. Women of the year “Shining star” award 2016 by CKC group, She was chosen as one of 100 women in India who make a difference in the society by BBC.Com. She is conferred with “Vasundara Mitra” Award 2016 by Kirloskar Ferrous Industries Limited. Recently she featured in a book “Dream Chasers” Women Entrepreneurs from the south of Vindyas.
