= Bhalswa landfill =

Landfill in India

Bhalswa landfill is an overfilled landfill waste dumping site in Delhi, in the National Capital Region, India; it is over 60 metres (200 ft) high. The site opened in 1994 and was declared overfilled in 2006, but remains in use, receiving more than 2,300 tons dumped daily in 2021. In 2022, the heap measured over 62 meters (203 feet).

The Municipal Corporation of Delhi (MCD) has set a target to completely flatten and clear the Bhalswa site by December 2026 as part of its broader plan to eliminate Delhi's major landfills, alongside Okhla and Ghazipur. Recent biomining operations at Bhalswa have been described as "rapid transformation" with the site's daily processing capacity increasing significantly as part of efforts to reclaim the land from the accumulated solid waste. In addition to clearing legacy waste, the site has been designated as an emerging pollution hotspot, prompting intensified dust control and monitoring directives from city authorities to address environmental impacts. The MCD has also invited proposals for the future use of land reclaimed from Bhalswa and other landfill sites, including potential development of parks, gaming zones, and other public or commercial facilities once remediation is complete. The Delhi government and the MCD are also considering developing a new Inter-State Bus Terminus (ISBT) on reclaimed land at the Bhalswa landfill. A feasibility study is being prepared to assess the proposal, which aims to reduce congestion at the Kashmiri Gate ISBT and improve inter-state bus operations.

== Impact ==
The site is a major source of environmental pollution, fire hazards, and public health and safety issues. A 2022 study of groundwater surrounding the nearby Bhalswa Lake found none of the water was fit for consumption. Prime Minister Modi has included removal of landfills in India's Clean India Mission.

== See also ==
- Ghazipur landfill
- Mavallipura
- Waste management in India
