= Mavallipura =

Village near Bangalore, India

Coordinates: 13.1217°N 77.5388°E

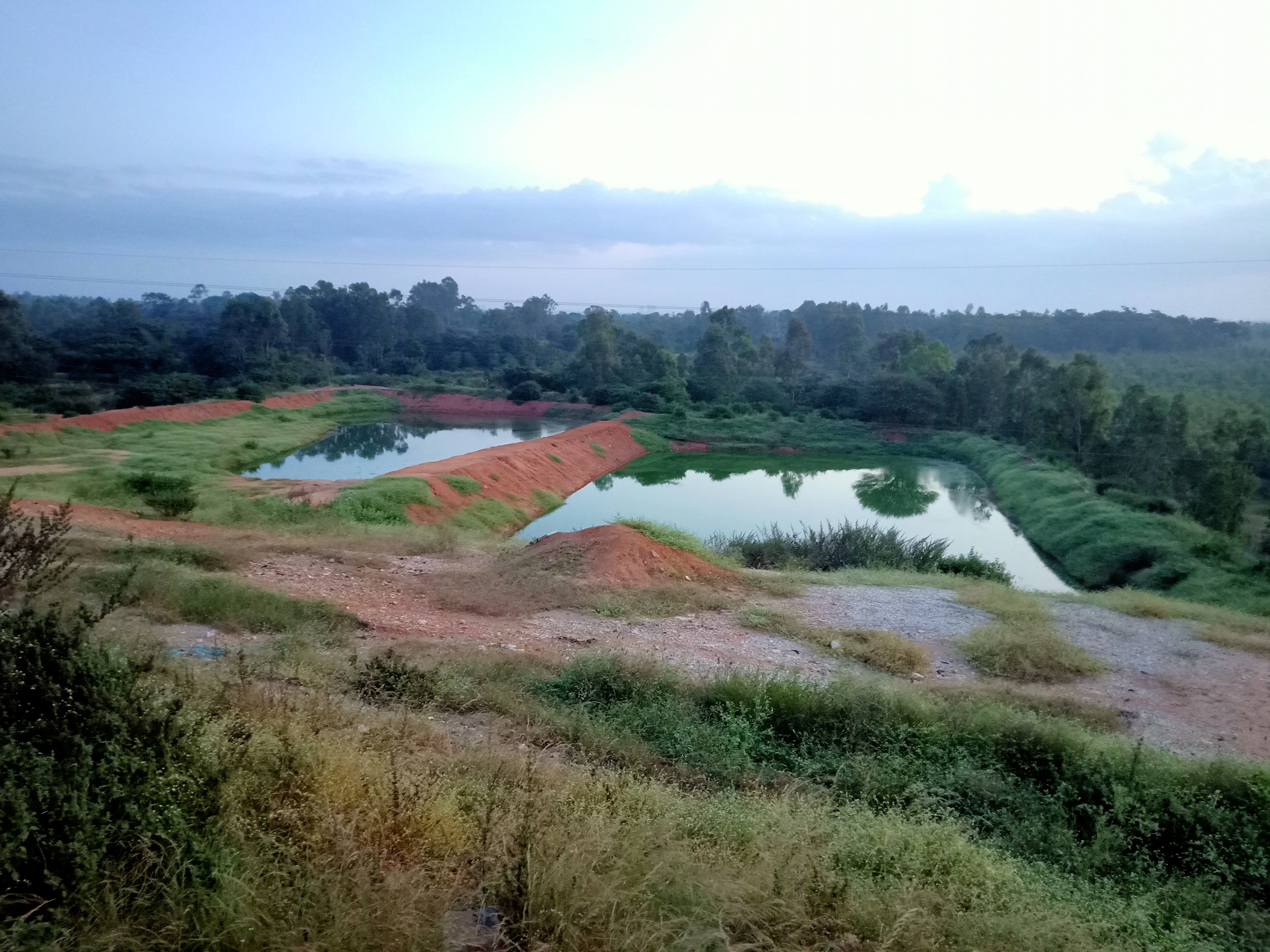
Leachate tanks seen from atop the landfill heap (2019)

Mavallipura is a village to the north of Bangalore. A part of the village, about 15 km (9.3 mi) north of the main part of the city was used as an illegal landfill from 2003 to 2015 resulting in an ecological disaster.

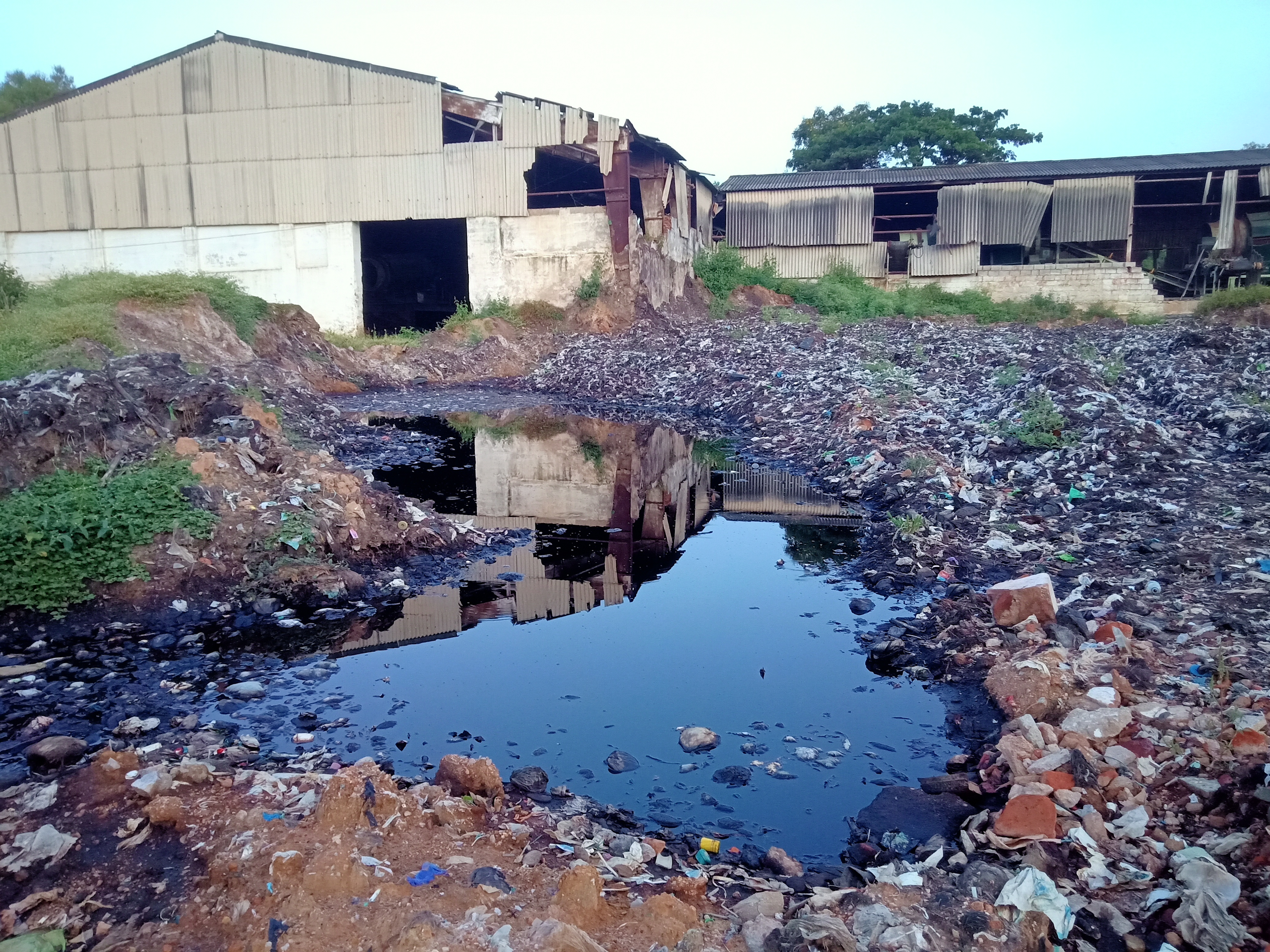
Disused landfill with black leachate (2019)

The village of Mavallipura had about a population of about 4500 with many involved in livestock rearing, grazing sheep, goat and cattle on the common grazing lands. Mavallipura was used from around 2003 to dump about four million tonnes of garbage (at about 1000 tonnes a day in that period) to become a large heap 40 m high and spread over several hectares. In the early years, the BBMP paid and signed a contract with a local farmer to dump garbage on his site, and it was discovered later that the land on which they dumped actually belonged to the Karnataka Forest Department. A larger plot of former grazing land was later leased out to a company called Ramky. The landfill was then operated by Ramky and garbage came from the Bangalore metropolitan authority or BBMP (Bruhat Bengaluru Mahanagara Palike). The company was set up in a position to handle 500 tons per day but even in the early days the inputs were as much as 1000 tons/day and rose to an estimated 3600 tons/day in 2015. In 2017, the garbage production of the city rose 4500 ton per day. The site was not identified by any administrative body based on public discussions and it was within the catchment of the Arkavathy river which flows into Kaveri which in turn supplies drinking water to the city of Bangalore. The toxic leachate from the unlined landfill site polluted the local lake and groundwater, resulting in deaths of villagers by kidney failure, cancer, and a range of illnesses. Burning of the garbage produced toxic fumes and flies were a major nuisance. The local population included many dalits and their voices were unheard. The open garbage attracted large scavenging birds like black kites resulted in a birdhit that caused the death of a pilot and posed a constant risk to Indian Air Force aircraft landing at the Yelahanka airbase. Livestock morbidity was high and after numerous complaints, the Karnataka Pollution Control Board took notice in 2012 and passed an order to stop the dumping. This resulted in garbage accumulation within the city of Bangalore and a crisis was recognized in 2014. However the dumping continued and in August 2015, a protester from the village, which had decided to blockade the garbage trucks, died of shock after facing police. The site operations were shut down only after being visited by a group of judges. One of the results of the case was that Bangalore became the first Indian metro to establish a solid waste management plan.

Studies on the movement of leached pollutants predict that they will flow along the hydraulic gradients of the area and pollute the groundwater in the vicinity.

== See also ==
- Bhalswa landfill
