= Ghazipur landfill =

Landfill in India

Coordinates: 28.6247°N 77.3277°E

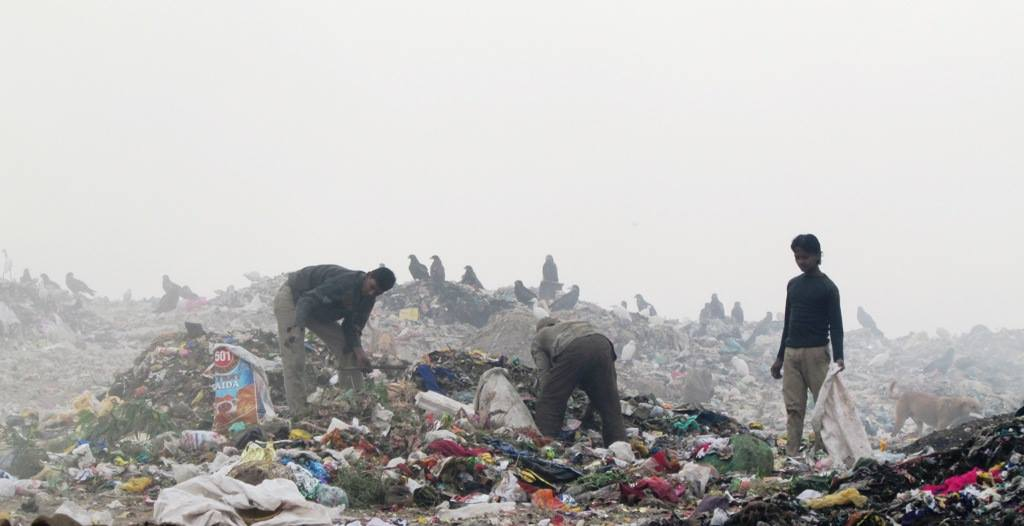
Waste pickers on top of Ghazipur landfill in 2013

The Ghazipur landfill is a landfill established in 1984. It is located in Ghazipur, a village in the eastern district of Delhi, India.

The landfill covers an area of approximately 70 acres (28 ha), and according to the last count in 2019, is 65 metres (213 feet) in height. Ghazipur has become one of the largest landfills in Delhi. The landfill reached its maximum capacity in 2002; however, it continues to receive solid waste from the city of Delhi.

Despite efforts to mitigate problems, long-term mismanagement at the landfill has created significant ongoing environmental, fire, and human health hazards, with the site emitting toxic gases, polluting groundwater, and creating an extreme fire hazard.

A major fire broke out at the landfill site on 21 April 2024; the fire rapidly spread, engulfing several areas of the landfill. Toxic smoke from the fire has caused significant health and breathing problems. The cause of the fire is undetermined.

In response to the environmental and public health concerns, the Municipal Corporation of Delhi (MCD), under the supervision of the National Green Tribunal (NGT), has increased remediation work at the Ghazipur landfill. In July 2025, the MCD submitted a detailed compliance report to the NGT outlining measures to control pollution, manage leachate, and address structural risks, including repairing surface cracks and installing perforated pipes to safely vent methane gas. The report stated that approximately 8.5 million metric tonnes of waste remained at the site as of March 2025 and that full clearance was targeted for 2028. Biomining operations at Ghazipur have progressed into its second phase, with authorities reporting that substantial quantities of legacy waste have already been processed and additional waste-processing facilities are being planned to accelerate reclamation and reduce the height of the landfill mound. As part of the longer-term redevelopment plans, the MCD has issued tenders for a new waste-to-energy plant at Ghazipur under a public–private partnership model to reduce reliance on open air dumping and convert a portion of municipal waste into energy. Alongside waste removal, municipal authorities have stated that reclaimed landfill land is intended to be converted into green or forested zones through plantation drives, with similar initiatives at other Delhi dumpsites involving the planting of bamboo and other vegetation to stabilise soil conditions and improve environmental conditions.

== See also ==
- Bhalswa landfill
- Mavallipura
- Waste management in India
