= List of Monuments of National Importance in Andhra Pradesh =

This is a list of Monuments of National Importance officially recognized by and available through the website of the Archaeological Survey of India (ASI) in the Indian state Andhra Pradesh. The monument identifier is a combination of the abbreviation of the subdivision of the list (state, ASI circle) and the numbering as published on the website of the ASI. As of August 2021, there are 135 Monuments of National Importance in Andhra Pradesh.

== List of monuments of national importance ==
SL. No.	Description	Location	Address	District	Coordinates	Image
N-AP-1	Hill Fort and buildings therein and the fortifications at the foot of the hill	Gooty		Anantapur	15°07′N 77°38′E	Hill Fort and buildings therein and the fortifications at the foot of the hill More images
N-AP-2	Madhavaraya temple (old Vishnu temple)	Gorantla		Sri Sathya Sai	13°59′03″N 77°46′01″E	Upload Photo
N-AP-3	Outer wall of the Mahalakshmi temple	Gorripalli		Sri Sathya Sai	13°51′13″N 77°27′10″E	Upload Photo
N-AP-4	Group of sculptures – Ancient Site	Hemavati		Sri Sathya Sai	14°01′39″N 76°59′46″E	Upload Photo
N-AP-5	Group of old temples together with adjacent land	Hemavati		Sri Sathya Sai	14°01′38″N 76°59′44″E	Upload Photo
N-AP-6	Large dolmen on a rocky hillock	Kalyandurg		Anantapur	14°34′15″N 77°07′34″E	Large dolmen on a rocky hillock
N-AP-7	Sri Kamala Malleswara Swamy Temple, Mallikarjuna (Siva) temple	Kambaduru		Anantapur	14°21′05″N 77°13′59″E	Upload Photo
N-AP-8	Virabhadra temple	Lepakshi		Sri Sathya Sai	13°48′07″N 77°36′34″E	Virabhadra temple More images
N-AP-9	Basavannah temple	Lepakshi		Sri Sathya Sai	13°48′12″N 77°36′45″E	Basavannah temple More images
N-AP-10	Hill fort	Madakasira		Sri Sathya Sai	13°56′38″N 77°16′07″E	Hill fort More images
N-AP-11	Large bastion and an old gateway	Madakasira		Sri Sathya Sai	13°56′23″N 77°16′10″E	Large bastion and an old gateway More images
N-AP-12	Old gopuram	Penukonda		Sri Sathya Sai	14°04′08″N 77°34′56″E	Upload Photo
N-AP-13	Old stamba or lamp pillar in the sub collector's office compound	Penukonda		Sri Sathya Sai	14°05′15″N 77°35′45″E	Upload Photo
N-AP-14	Seethatheertham stepped well with entrance in the form of a bull	Penukonda		Sri Sathya Sai	14°04′46″N 77°35′44″E	Seethatheertham stepped well with entrance in the form of a bull More images
N-AP-15	Small pavilion and ruined water tower in a field	Penukonda		Sri Sathya Sai	14°04′39″N 77°35′46″E	Upload Photo
N-AP-16	The citadel and ruined buildings on the hill	Penukonda		Sri Sathya Sai	14°04′39″N 77°35′11″E	Upload Photo
N-AP-17	The Hill fort and northern gateway with inscriptions	Penukonda		Sri Sathya Sai	14°05′05″N 77°35′42″E	The Hill fort and northern gateway with inscriptions More images
N-AP-18	Watch tower known as Rama's bastion	Penukonda		Sri Sathya Sai	14°05′08″N 77°35′30″E	Upload Photo
N-AP-19	Hill fortress and a large well	Ratnagiri		Sri Sathya Sai	13°48′57″N 77°07′34″E	Hill fortress and a large well More images
N-AP-20	Extensive hill-fortress with outlying fortification excluding the fort gate	Rayadurg		Anantapur	14°42′24″N 76°50′24″E	Upload Photo
N-AP-21	Palace and two temples of Rama and Krishna	Rayadurg		Anantapur	14°42′10″N 76°50′12″E	Upload Photo
N-AP-22	Chintala Venkataramana Temple	Tadipatri		Anantapur	14°54′40″N 78°00′38″E	Chintala Venkataramana Temple More images
N-AP-23	Rameswaraswami temple	Tadipatri		Anantapur	14°55′05″N 78°00′37″E	Rameswaraswami temple More images
N-AP-24	Lower Fort and structure	Chandragiri		Tirupati	13°34′57″N 79°18′18″E	Lower Fort and structure More images
N-AP-25	Upper Fort	Chandragiri		Tirupati	13°35′15″N 79°17′41″E	Upper Fort More images
N-AP-26	Parasuramesvara temple	Gudimallam, Tirupati		Tirupati	13°36′13″N 79°34′39″E	Parasuramesvara temple More images
N-AP-27	Fort	Gurramkonda		Annamayya	13°46′17″N 78°35′18″E	Fort More images
N-AP-28	Lower Fort, Center Fort wall, moat, old fort gateway, old hanuman temple, old mandapam	Gurramkonda		Annamayya	13°46′32″N 78°35′10″E	Upload Photo
N-AP-29	Mahal	Gurramkonda		Annamayya	13°46′36″N 78°35′11″E	Mahal More images
N-AP-30	Palliswara Mudaiya Madeya temple	Kalakada		Annamayya	13°50′N 78°47′E	Upload Photo
N-AP-31	Venkateswara Vishnu temple	Mangapuram, Tirupati		Tirupati	13°36′39″N 79°19′39″E	Venkateswara Vishnu temple More images
N-AP-32	Megalithic cairns with bounding stone circles	Pandur		Chittoor	13°32′24″N 79°55′31″E	Upload Photo
N-AP-33	Chennakeswaraswami temple	Sompalle		Annamayya	13°50′13″N 78°17′53″E	Chennakeswaraswami temple More images
N-AP-34	Megalithic cists and cairns	Virakuppam (Birakuppam)		Chittoor	13°27′44″N 79°50′42″E	Upload Photo
N-AP-35	Mounds containing Buddhist remains such as stupas	Adurru		Konaseema	16°28′43″N 81°57′18″E	Mounds containing Buddhist remains such as stupas More images
N-AP-36	Gollingeswara group of temples	Biccavolu		East Godavari	16°57′34″N 82°02′55″E	Gollingeswara group of temples More images
N-AP-37	Kanchragudi	Biccavolu		East Godavari	16°57′34″N 82°03′13″E	Kanchragudi More images
N-AP-38	Monolithic Ganesa Image	Biccavolu		East Godavari	16°57′42″N 82°03′14″E	Monolithic Ganesa Image More images
N-AP-39	Nakkalagudi	Biccavolu		East Godavari	16°57′22″N 82°02′54″E	Nakkalagudi More images
N-AP-40	Veerabhadra temple	Biccavolu		East Godavari	16°57′43″N 82°03′07″E	Veerabhadra temple More images
N-AP-41	Bhimeswara temple	Draksharama		Konaseema	16°47′35″N 82°03′49″E	Bhimeswara temple More images
N-AP-42	Rock-cut caves, cisterns and remains of Buddhist monasteries, Stupas on the hill pandavulakonda or pandavakonda	Kapavaram		East Godavari	17°10′05″N 81°48′44″E	Rock-cut caves, cisterns and remains of Buddhist monasteries, Stupas on the hill pandavulakonda or pandavakonda More images
N-AP-43	Buddhist remains at Kodavali	Kodavali		Kakinada	17°14′26″N 82°16′20″E	Buddhist remains at Kodavali More images
N-AP-44	Kumara Bhimeswara temple	Samalkota		Kakinada	17°02′32″N 82°10′17″E	Kumara Bhimeswara temple More images
N-AP-45	Ruined Buddhist stupa and other remains	Amaravati		Palnadu	16°34′33″N 80°21′25″E	Ruined Buddhist stupa and other remains More images
N-AP-46	Ancient Siva temple with inscription	Ayyangaripalam (Hamlet of Pondugula)		Palnadu	16°38′16″N 79°39′09″E	Upload Photo
N-AP-47	Sri Bhavanarayanaswami temple	Bapatla		Bapatla	15°54′21″N 80°28′04″E	Upload Photo
N-AP-48	Ruined Buddhist stupa	Bhattiprolu		Bapatla	16°06′N 80°47′E	Ruined Buddhist stupa More images
N-AP-49	The Sculptures, carvings, images or other like objects discovered within the revenue limit	Buddam		Bapatla	15°57′25″N 80°34′11″E	Upload Photo
N-AP-50	Kapoteswara temple with the inscriptional monuments within the temple site(slabs in the temple site)	Chejerla		Palnadu	16°18′59″N 79°50′58″E	Kapoteswara temple with the inscriptional monuments within the temple site(slabs in the temple site) More images
N-AP-51	Inscribed rock to the west of Dharanikota	Amaravati		Palnadu	16°34′54″N 80°19′57″E	Upload Photo
N-AP-52	Fort in ruins	Dharanikota		Palnadu	16°34′32″N 80°20′44″E	Upload Photo
N-AP-53	Mounds with ancient remains on them	Grandhasiri		Palnadu	16°34′36″N 80°09′08″E	Mounds with ancient remains on them More images
N-AP-54	Inscribed marble pillar near the Gopala temple	Ipuru		Palnadu	16°13′46″N 79°46′30″E	Upload Photo
N-AP-55	Ancient Buddhist remains and Brahmi inscriptions on the mound	Manchikallu		Palnadu	16°29′11″N 79°32′23″E	Upload Photo
N-AP-56	Reconstructed monuments at Anupu and Nagarjunklonda hilltop	Nagarjunakonda		Palnadu	16°30′13″N 79°16′35″E	Upload Photo
N-AP-57	Mounds within the limit of Nagulavaram	Nagulavaram		Palnadu	16°30′09″N 79°16′46″E	Upload Photo
N-AP-58	The Sculptures, carvings, images on the ancient mound	Pullareddigudem		Palnadu	16°31′22″N 79°14′47″E	Upload Photo
N-AP-59	1. The mounds with remains of ancient building between the hillock of Nagarjuna Konda and the village of Pullareddigudem, 2. Mounds adjacent to the hillock reddigudem, 3. Hill of Nagarjunakonda with the ancient remains	Pullareddigudem (Agarharam)		Palnadu	16°31′13″N 79°14′21″E	1. The mounds with remains of ancient building between the hillock of Nagarjuna Konda and the village of Pullareddigudem, 2. Mounds adjacent to the hillock reddigudem, 3. Hill of Nagarjunakonda with the ancient remains; More images
N-AP-60	Fort-storeyed rock-cut Hindu temple	Undavalli		Guntur district	16°29′49″N 80°34′54″E	Fort-storeyed rock-cut Hindu temple More images
N-AP-61	Mounds with ancient remains	Velpur		Palnadu	16°34′48″N 80°07′39″E	Mounds with ancient remains More images
N-AP-62	Vigneswara swamy temple	Chilamakuru		Kadapa YSR	14°38′44″N 78°28′13″E	Upload Photo
N-AP-63	Agastheswar Swamy Temple	Chilamkur		Kadapa YSR	14°38′44″N 78°28′13″E	Upload Photo
N-AP-64	Remains of the buried Jain temple	Daanavulapadu		Kadapa YSR	14°47′13″N 78°26′18″E	Upload Photo
N-AP-65	Fort with enclosed ancient buildings, Madhavaperumal temple and tower known as Madarsala	Gandikota		Kadapa YSR	14°48′47″N 78°17′04″E	Fort with enclosed ancient buildings, Madhavaperumal temple and tower known as Madarsala More images
N-AP-66	Saumyanatha temple	Nandalur		Annamayya	14°16′03″N 79°07′14″E	Saumyanatha temple More images
N-AP-67	Ancient Village sites	Peddamudiyam		Kadapa YSR	15°00′53″N 78°26′52″E	Upload Photo
N-AP-68	Kothandaramaswami Temple	Peddamudiyam		Kadapa YSR	15°00′46″N 78°27′07″E	Upload Photo
N-AP-69	Mukundesvara temple with inscriptions	Peddamudiyam		Kadapa YSR	15°00′51″N 78°26′59″E	Upload Photo
N-AP-70	Narasimha temple	Peddamudiyam		Kadapa YSR	15°00′46″N 78°26′55″E	Upload Photo
N-AP-71	Old Vishnu temples with inscriptions	Peddanudiyam		Kadapa YSR	15°00′51″N 78°26′59″E	Upload Photo
N-AP-72	Athirala Parasurama temple	Rajampet	Athirala Rajampet	Annamayya	14°14′39″N 79°09′49″E	Upload Photo
N-AP-73	Bheemeshwara swami temple	Pushpagiri (hamlet of Kotluru)		Kadapa YSR	14°35′45″N 78°45′24″E	Bheemeshwara swami temple More images
N-AP-74	Indranadheshwara swami temple	Pushpagiri (hamlet of Kotluru)		Kadapa YSR	14°36′05″N 78°45′22″E	Indranadheshwara swami temple More images
N-AP-75	Kamalasambheshwara swamy temple	Pushpagiri (hamlet of Kotluru)		Kadapa YSR	14°35′42″N 78°45′39″E	Kamalasambheshwara swamy temple More images
N-AP-76	Raghaveswara swamy temple	Pushpagiri (hamlet of Kotluru)		Kadapa YSR	14°35′44″N 78°45′24″E	Raghaveswara swamy temple More images
N-AP-77	Sivakesavaswami temple	Pushpagiri (hamlet of Kotluru)		Kadapa YSR	14°35′40″N 78°45′38″E	Sivakesavaswami temple More images
N-AP-78	Trikoteswara swami temple	Pushpagiri (hamlet of Kotluru)		Kadapa YSR	14°35′45″N 78°45′23″E	Trikoteswara swami temple More images
N-AP-79	Vaidhyanadha swamy temple	Pushpagiri (hamlet of Kotluru)		Kadapa YSR	14°35′44″N 78°45′24″E	Vaidhyanadha swamy temple More images
N-AP-80	Siddavatam Fort	Siddavatam		Kadapa YSR	14°27′59″N 78°58′03″E	Siddavatam Fort More images
N-AP-81	Visvanatha swamy temple	Sivalpalle (Pushpagiri)		Kadapa YSR	14°34′52″N 78°45′49″E	Visvanatha swamy temple More images
N-AP-82	Sri Kodandarma swamy temple and adjoining buildings	Vontimitta		Kadapa YSR	14°23′38″N 79°01′35″E	Sri Kodandarma swamy temple and adjoining buildings More images
N-AP-83	Ancient site with the mound marking the Buddhist Stupas in it	Alluru		NTR District	16°46′18″N 80°26′17″E	Ancient site with the mound marking the Buddhist Stupas in it More images
N-AP-84	Buddhist remains in a mound	Ghantasala		Krishna	16°10′12″N 80°56′56″E	Buddhist remains in a mound More images
N-AP-85	Mound containing Buddhist remains and ancient village site	Gudivada		Krishna	16°25′56″N 81°00′11″E	Upload Photo
N-AP-86	Sculptures, carvings, images other like objects found in the vicinity of the old Mosque	Gudur		Krishna	16°12′54″N 81°04′56″E	Upload Photo
N-AP-87	Hillock containing the mound marking the ancient remains of Buddhist stupas situated on it	Gummadiduru		NTR District	16°51′41″N 80°19′04″E	Upload Photo
N-AP-88	Buddhist remains of a Stupa on the hill	Jaggayyapeta		NTR District	16°53′13″N 80°06′23″E	Buddhist remains of a Stupa on the hill More images
N-AP-89	Bandar Fort: 1) Armoury known as Fort and customs office, Bandar Fort customs office, 2) Belfry	Masulipatnam		Krishna	16°09′08″N 81°09′10″E	Upload Photo
N-AP-90	Dutch cemetery (D.No. 308)	Masulipatnam		Krishna	16°11′56″N 81°08′36″E	Upload Photo
N-AP-91	Rock-cut cave temples on the Hill	Mogalrajapuram		NTR District	16°30′22″N 80°38′49″E	Rock-cut cave temples on the Hill More images
N-AP-92	Ancient site and remains comprised in survey plot No. 37	Munagacherla		NTR District		Upload Photo
N-AP-93	Four pillars in the ruined mandapam in Jammidoddi	Vijayawada		NTR District	16°30′58″N 80°36′30″E	Upload Photo
N-AP-94	Inscribed Pillar and slab in Mallesvarasvami temple	Vijayawada		NTR District	16°30′58″N 80°36′27″E	Upload Photo
N-AP-95	Kiratharjuna Pillar on the Indrakilla Hill	Vijayawada		NTR District	16°30′50″N 80°36′24″E	Kiratharjuna Pillar on the Indrakilla Hill More images
N-AP-96	Two rock-cut cave temples on the Indrakila hill known as Akkana Madanna cave	Vijayawada		NTR District	16°30′50″N 80°36′24″E	Two rock-cut cave temples on the Indrakila hill known as Akkana Madanna cave More images
N-AP-97	Ruined fort and buildings therein except Ramazan masjid	Adoni		Kurnool	15°38′49″N 77°16′38″E	Ruined fort and buildings therein except Ramazan masjid More images
N-AP-98	Inscribed boulder bearing Andhra records of 150 A.D.	Chinnakadaburu		Kurnool		Upload Photo
N-AP-99	A prominent granite hillock bearing Asokan inscriptions	Jonnagiri		Kurnool	15°12′36″N 77°34′38″E	A prominent granite hillock bearing Asokan inscriptions More images
N-AP-100	Gateways and the bastions of the old fort, viz 1) Bastion No.1 Beach Ghantki Buruzu 2) Bastion No.2 Lal Bangalow Buruzu 3) Gateway to Gopala Darwaja 4) Gateway to Panikiddi	Kurnool		Kurnool	15°50′02″N 78°02′55″E	Gateways and the bastions of the old fort, viz 1) Bastion No.1 Beach Ghantki Buruzu 2) Bastion No.2 Lal Bangalow Buruzu 3) Gateway to Gopala Darwaja 4) Gateway to Panikiddi More images
N-AP-101	Mausoleum known as Abdul Wahab Khan's Tomb and adjoining buildings	Kurnool		Kurnool	15°49′38″N 78°02′48″E	Mausoleum known as Abdul Wahab Khan's Tomb and adjoining buildings More images
N-AP-102	Nandavaram Temple including the sculpture of Subrahamanya	Nandavaram		Kurnool	15°22′25″N 78°16′48″E	Upload Photo
N-AP-103	The Asokan inscription, Two early Chalukya inscriptions and One late Chalukya inscriptions.	Rajulamandagiri (Hamlet of Jutur)		Kurnool	15°26′06″N 77°28′18″E	Upload Photo
N-AP-104	Inscribed stone lying to the east of Siva temple	Rayachoti		Kurnool	15°54′09″N 77°37′18″E	Upload Photo
N-AP-105	Old Cave Temple	Yaganti		Nandyal	15°21′04″N 78°08′19″E	Old Cave Temple More images
N-AP-106	Uma-Mahesvaraswami Temple	Yaganti		Nandyal	15°21′03″N 78°08′18″E	Uma-Mahesvaraswami Temple More images
N-AP-107	Ancient Mounds	Kanuparti		Prakasam	15°35′01″N 80°12′44″E	Upload Photo
N-AP-108	A group of eight rock-cut temples in Bhairavakonda hill	Kottapalli		Prakasam	15°05′21″N 79°12′02″E	A group of eight rock-cut temples in Bhairavakonda hill More images
N-AP-109	Chola Temple	Motupalle		Prakasam	15°43′16″N 80°17′35″E	Chola Temple More images
N-AP-110	Chinnaganjam-Uppugudur Buddhist Stupa complex	Pedaganjam		Prakasam	15°40′48″N 80°12′25″E	Upload Photo
N-AP-111	Pitikeswara group of temples including Approach road	Pittikayagulla		Prakasam	15°28′45″N 79°07′18″E	Upload Photo
N-AP-112	Ancient Site	Pusalapadu		Prakasam	15°30′29″N 79°06′28″E	Upload Photo
N-AP-113	Ramalingeswara group of temples	Satiavel (Satyavolu)		Prakasam	15°24′11″N 78°58′49″E	Upload Photo
N-AP-114	Mound known as 'Bodipati Dibba'	Ramatirtham (Hamlet of Varini)		SPSR Nellore	14°38′15″N 80°08′28″E	Upload Photo
N-AP-115	Ancient Mound in part of S.No. 855 A	Ramatirtham		SPSR Nellore	14°38′22″N 80°08′29″E	Upload Photo
N-AP-116	Hill Fort with Ancient buildings therein	Udayagiri		SPSR Nellore	14°52′47″N 79°16′12″E	Hill Fort with Ancient buildings therein More images
N-AP-117	Krishna Temple in a part of Donka with Gopuram, Kalyanamandapam and Masonry built Tank	Udayagiri		SPSR Nellore	14°51′55″N 79°16′31″E	Upload Photo
N-AP-118	Ranganayakula Temple	Udayagiri		SPSR Nellore	14°52′41″N 79°17′46″E	Ranganayakula Temple More images
N-AP-119	Ancient Mound	Kalingapatnam		Srikakulam	18°19′50″N 84°06′39″E	Ancient Mound More images
N-AP-120	Sri Somesvara temple	Mukhalingam		Srikakulam	18°35′30″N 83°57′53″E	Sri Somesvara temple More images
N-AP-121	Bhimesvara temple	Mukhalingesvara		Srikakulam	18°35′39″N 83°57′52″E	Bhimesvara temple More images
N-AP-122	Mukhalingesvara temple	Mukhalingesvara		Srikakulam	18°35′42″N 83°57′49″E	Mukhalingesvara temple More images
N-AP-123	Buddhist remains: 1) Six Images 2) Three images and some more images on the hill 3) One image 4) Three images	Salihundam		Srikakulam	18°20′02″N 84°02′34″E	Buddhist remains: 1) Six Images 2) Three images and some more images on the hill 3) One image 4) Three images More images
N-AP-124	Eastern portion of Salihundam hill containing Buddhist remains (A Chaitya and four stupas)	Salihundam		Srikakulam	18°20′02″N 84°02′34″E	Eastern portion of Salihundam hill containing Buddhist remains (A Chaitya and four stupas) More images
N-AP-125	Ancient Buddhist Mounds locally known as 'Dhana Dibbalu'	Kotturu (near Gokivada forest)		Anakapalli	17°31′42″N 82°54′36″E	Ancient Buddhist Mounds locally known as 'Dhana Dibbalu' More images
N-AP-126	Buddhist rock-cut stupas, Dagabas and caves and the ruins of a structural Chaitya with its outbuilding and other Ancient remains on twoadjoining hills known as Bojjanna Konda.	Sankaram		Anakapalli	17°42′37″N 83°00′58″E	Buddhist rock-cut stupas, Dagabas and caves and the ruins of a structural Chaitya with its outbuilding and other Ancient remains on twoadjoining hills known as Bojjanna Konda. More images
N-AP-127	Durga Bhairavakonda having an ancient monument called Durga	Nilavati		Vizianagaram District	18°10′29″N 83°19′23″E	Upload Photo
N-AP-128	Ruined Buddhist Monastery at Gurubhaktulakonda	Ramatheertham		Vizianagaram District	18°10′34″N 83°29′12″E	Ruined Buddhist Monastery at Gurubhaktulakonda More images
N-AP-129	The old temple (Dibbesvarasvami temple)	Sarapalli (Sarapalle)		Vizianagaram	18°08′03″N 83°28′01″E	The old temple (Dibbesvarasvami temple) More images
N-AP-130	Mounds containing Buddhist remains	Arugolanu		West Godavari	16°50′15″N 81°34′50″E	Upload Photo
N-AP-131	Mounds locally known as Bhimalingadibba	Denduluru		Eluru	16°45′41″N 81°09′57″E	Upload Photo
N-AP-132	Buddhist monuments: 1) Rock-cut temple 2) Large Monastery 3) Small Monastery 4) Brick Chaitya 5) Ruined Mandapa 6) Stone built Stupa and Large group of stupas.	Guntupalli		Eluru	17°01′12″N 81°07′50″E	Upload Photo
N-AP-132-a	Buddhist monuments: 1) Rock-cut temple	Guntupalli		Eluru	17°01′07″N 81°07′46″E	Buddhist monuments: 1) Rock-cut temple
N-AP-132-b	Buddhist monuments: 2) Large Monastery	Guntupalli		Eluru	17°01′09″N 81°07′48″E	Buddhist monuments: 2) Large Monastery
N-AP-132-c	Buddhist monuments: 3) Small Monastery	Guntupalli		Eluru	17°01′12″N 81°07′47″E	Buddhist monuments: 3) Small Monastery
N-AP-132-d	Buddhist monuments: 4) Brick Chaitya	Guntupalli		Eluru	17°01′12″N 81°07′50″E	Buddhist monuments: 4) Brick Chaitya
N-AP-132-e	Buddhist monuments: 5) Ruined Mandapa	Guntupalli		Eluru	17°01′12″N 81°07′50″E	Buddhist monuments: 5) Ruined Mandapa
N-AP-132-f	Buddhist monuments: 6) Stone built Stupa and Large group of stupas.	Guntupalli		Eluru	17°01′10″N 81°07′54″E	Buddhist monuments: 6) Stone built Stupa and Large group of stupas. More images
N-AP-133	The caves and structural stupa of Archaeological interest on Dharmalingesvarasvami hill	Jilakarragudem (Hamlet of Guntupalli)		Eluru	17°00′58″N 81°07′41″E	The caves and structural stupa of Archaeological interest on Dharmalingesvarasvami hill
N-AP-134	Ancient Mounds in S.No. 501-1	Pedavegi		Eluru	16°48′51″N 81°06′23″E	Ancient Mounds in S.No. 501-1
N-AP-135	The mounds of Pedavegi : Dibba No.1 Dibba No.2, Dibba No. 3, Dibba No. 4, Dibba No. 5.	Pedavegi		Eluru		The mounds of Pedavegi : Dibba No.1 Dibba No.2, Dibba No. 3, Dibba No. 4, Dibba No. 5.

== See also ==
- List of Monuments of National Importance in India for other Monuments of National Importance in India
- List of State Protected Monuments in Andhra Pradesh
- List of Monuments of National Importance in Telangana (a state formed in 2014)
