= Ratnagiri Fort =

Ratnagiri Fort may refer to either of these forts in India:

- Ratnagiri Fort, Maharashtra, a coastal fort in Ratnagiri district, also known as Ratnadurg
- Ratnagiri Fort, Andhra Pradesh, a hill fort in Sri Sathya Sai district

== See also ==
- Ratnagiri (disambiguation)
