= Ratnagiri (disambiguation) =

Ratnagiri may refer to:

- Ratnagiri, a municipality in Maharashtra, India
  - Ratnagiri taluka, a sub-division in which the municipality is located
  - Ratnagiri district, in which the municipality and the taluka is located
  - Ratnagiri Airport, located at Mirjole in the Ratnagiri district
  - Ratnagiri Lok Sabha constituency, a former national parliamentary constituency
  - Ratnagiri Assembly constituency, a state assembly constituency
  - Ratnagiri Fort, Maharashtra, a coastal fort also known as Ratnadurg
  - Ratnagiri railway station, which serves the city
  - Ratnagiri railway division of Indian Railways
- Ratnagiri Fort, Andhra Pradesh, located in Sri Sathya Sai district in India
- Ratnagiri, Odisha, an ancient Buddhist site in India
- Ratnagiri Murugan Temple, in Vellore district of Tamil Nadu, India
- Ratnagiri, one of Rajgir Hills in Bihar on which the ancient Indian city of Rajgir was settled

== See also ==
- Ratnagiri Fort (disambiguation)
