= Madakasira Fort =

Madakasira
- Madakasira, Sri Sathya Sai district, Andhra Pradesh in India
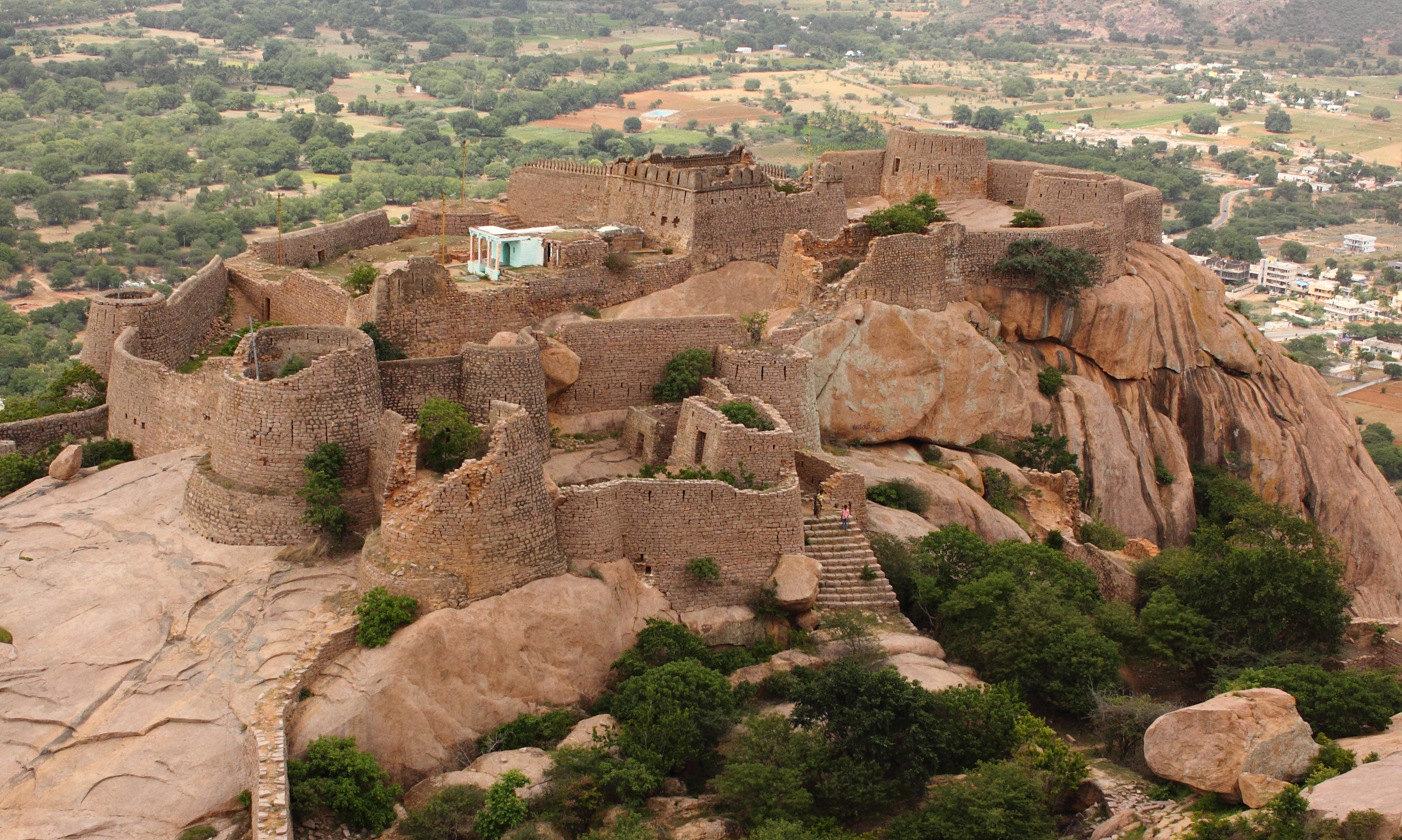
- Madakasira Fort

Site information
- Type: Fort
- Owner: Government of India

Location
- Location in Andhra Pradesh, India Madakasira (India)
- Coordinates: 13.94375°N 77.26853°E

Site history
- Built: 16th century

Madakasira Fort, also known as Simhagiri, is a hill fort located in the Madakasira town of Sri Sathya Sai district, in Andhra Pradesh, India. The Government of India has designated it as a Monument of National Importance.

== History ==
According to the Kaifiyat of Madakasira, in 1492, a man named Siruda Rangappa Nayaka established the present-day Madakasira village near an older village called Madakapalle or Mandavyapalle. He named the new village Matakapalle, and built a small fort on the local hill. He was defeated by Muslim chiefs who established their headquarters at the nearby Ratnagiri.

In the early 17th century, the fort was held by a local chief, who accepted the suzerainty of the Vijayanagara Empire. The members of the family that established present-day Madakasira, near the former village of Madakapalle, were apparently chiefs of Sira. After the Bijapur Sultanate captured Sira, the ruler of Bijapur granted Madakapalle and the nearby Ratnagiri to these chiefs. The rulers of Bijapur revoked and restored the grant several times.

In 1746, the Maratha adventurer Murari Rao established himself at Gooty, and established his suzerainty over several nearby forts, including Madakasira. The chief of Madakasira became his tributary. In 1762, Hyder Ali of Mysore captured the fort after a 4-day siege, supported by the Portuguese troops led by Don António de Noronha, the Bishop of Halicarnasus. Two of Hyder Ali's Portuguese officers - Jose Reiz and Bento de Campos - died during the siege, and Noronha left the alliance shortly after. Murari Rao regained control of the fort after sometime, but Hyder Ali recaptured it soon after.

In 1792, Hyder Ali's son Tipu Sultan ceded the area to the Nizam of Hyderabad as per the Treaty of Seringapatam. In 1800, the Nizam ceded it to the British.

== Structures ==
The fort has several structures and caves, including seven gates. Murari Rao built several of these structures, including temples and the Hinduraya well. He also built a hill-top structure called Singe-moothi ("face of lion"), which has four pillars and a big bell. The hilltop has a palace called Rani Mahal, a horse shed, a gym and food storage points.

Sri Ramalingeswara temple exists close to the hilltop, with two water ponds. Venkateswara temple exists near the south gate of the fort, and was left incomplete at the time of Hyder Ali's invasion. The Garuda temple was consecrated in the 1990s.
