= Madhavaraya Temple, Gandikota =

Madhavaraya Temple
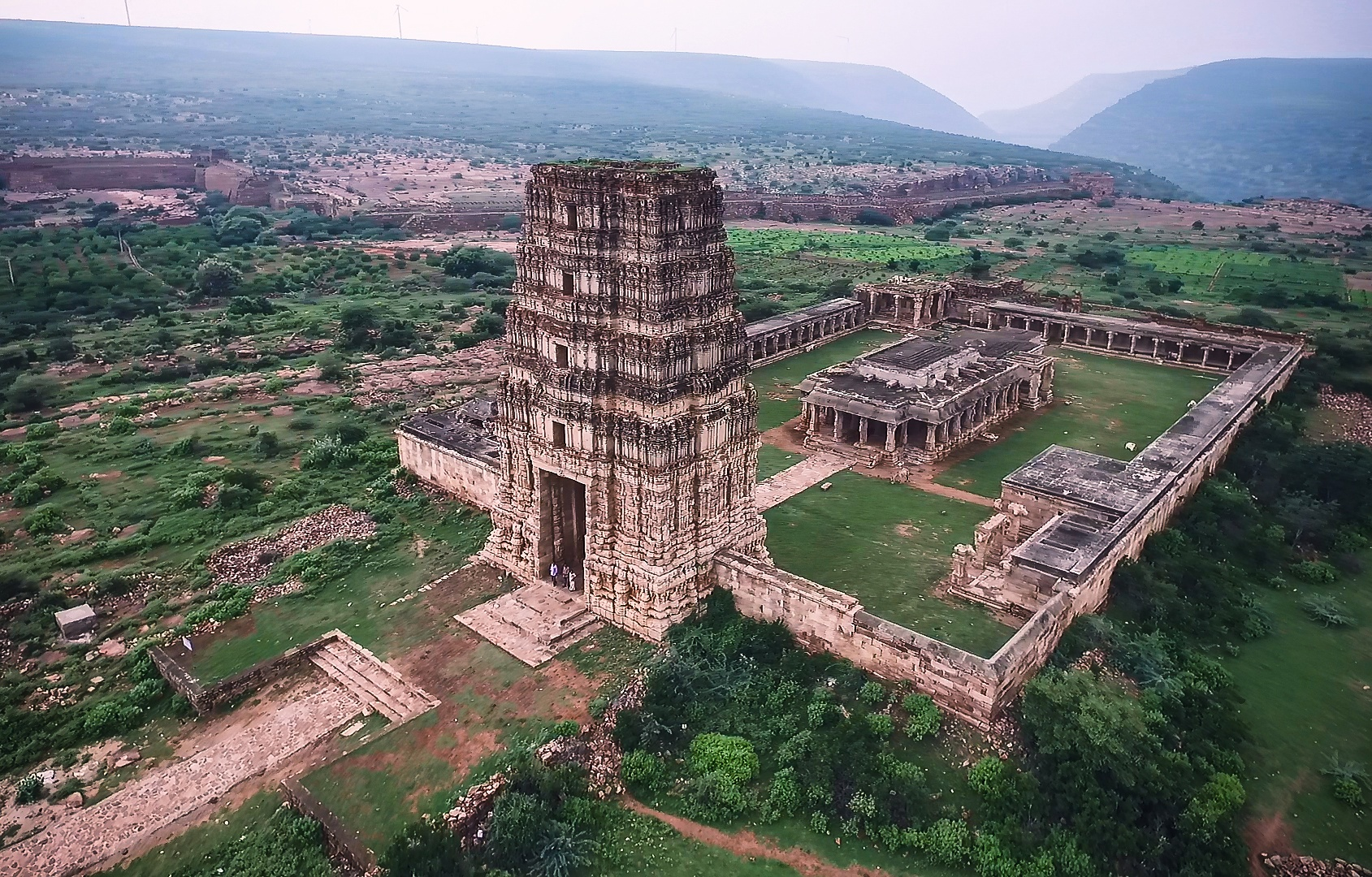
- Madhavaraya Temple courtyard

- Location in Andhra Pradesh, India Madhavaraya Temple, Gandikota (India)

Religion
- Affiliation: Hinduism
- District: Kadapa
- Deity: Madhavaraya (Krishna)

Location
- Location: Gandikota
- State: Andhra Pradesh
- Country: India
- Interactive map of Madhavaraya Temple
- Coordinates: 14.81327°N 78.283837°E

Architecture
- Style: Vijayanagara
- Established: First quarter of the 16th century

Madhavaraya Temple is a 16th-century Hindu temple located in the Gandikota Fort, in the Kadapa district of Andhra Pradesh, India. Dedicated to Krishna ("Madhava"), it is also known as Madhava Perumal Temple or Madhavaraya Swamy Temple. The Government of India has designated it as a Monument of National Importance.

== History ==
An analysis of the art and architectural features of the temple suggests that it was built in the first quarter of the 16th century. Epigraphic evidence also confirms this: the earliest reference to the temple is found in 16th-century inscriptions. Several 16th-century inscriptions from the Vijayanagara period have been discovered at Gandikota. One of these states that several individuals, including a man named Papa Timmaraju, paid obeisance to the god Madhava-raya ("Lord Krishna") and offered a garland (tomala) to the god.

== Art and architecture ==
The temple is located within the Gandikota Fort, to the south of the local Jumma Masjid. It is surrounded by a prakara in a rectangular courtyard. The east side has the entrance, and a pillared cloister runs along the other sides. The pillars feature Vijayanagara-style corbels.

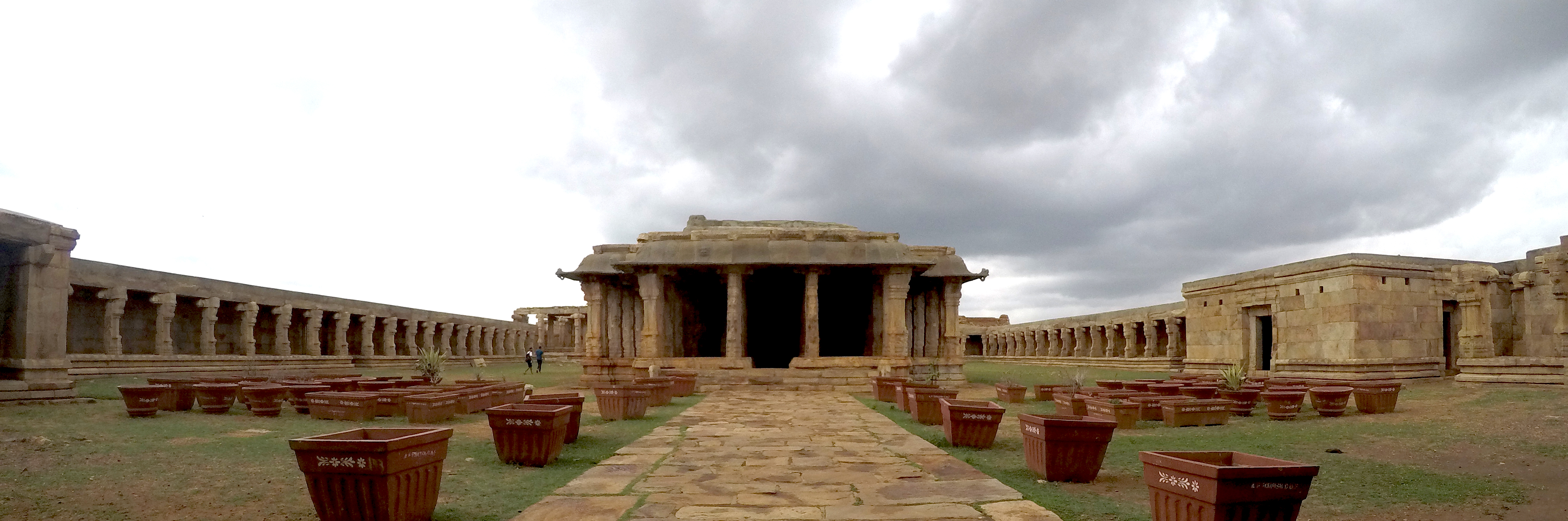
Courtyard with pillared cloister and mandapa at the centre

The main gopura (tower) gateway is located in the east, with narrower entrances in the other three directions. Its ornate platform (adhishthana) has carvings of creepers, flowers, lotus petals, elephants, warriors, vyalas, and other figures. The projections of the lower portions of the adhishthana contain figures of various deities, including Venugopala, Surya, Vishnu, Lakshmi, Ganapati, and Yoga Narasimha. The two vertical projections at the entrance feature a row of figures of deities and two identical sculptures of Vishnu. The gopura has four levels (talas), and its shikhara (top) has fallen. The central passage of the gateway features carvings of dvara-palakas (male door-keepers) and female figures standing under creepers. The central pillars on the sides of the passage have brackets with vyala figures. The ceiling has lotus medallion at the centre, and other decorative motifs including tortoise, fish, and lizards.

A kitchen hall is located in the south-east corner of the courtyard. Its pillars have roll and leaf corbels, and the ceiling has gaps to provide ventilation. The doorway has decorative figures of creepers, flowers, lotus petals, and dvara-palikas (female door-keepers) carrying lotuses. A mandapa with six pillars is located in front of the kitchen hall.

A wedding hall (kalyana-mandapa) with 16 pillars is located in the south-west corner of the courtyard. Another mandapa is located in the north-east corner of the courtyard: it was probably used as a shrine dedicated to the nine planets (navagraha-mandapa) or a site to celebrate a festival of the main deity. Its doorways feature carvings of creepers, flowers, lotus petals, and Gaja-Lakshmi motifs. A shrine with an oblong garbha-griha is also located in the north-east portion, to the east of the navagraha-mandapa. It has no images now, but was probably dedicated to Alvars or Saptarishis.

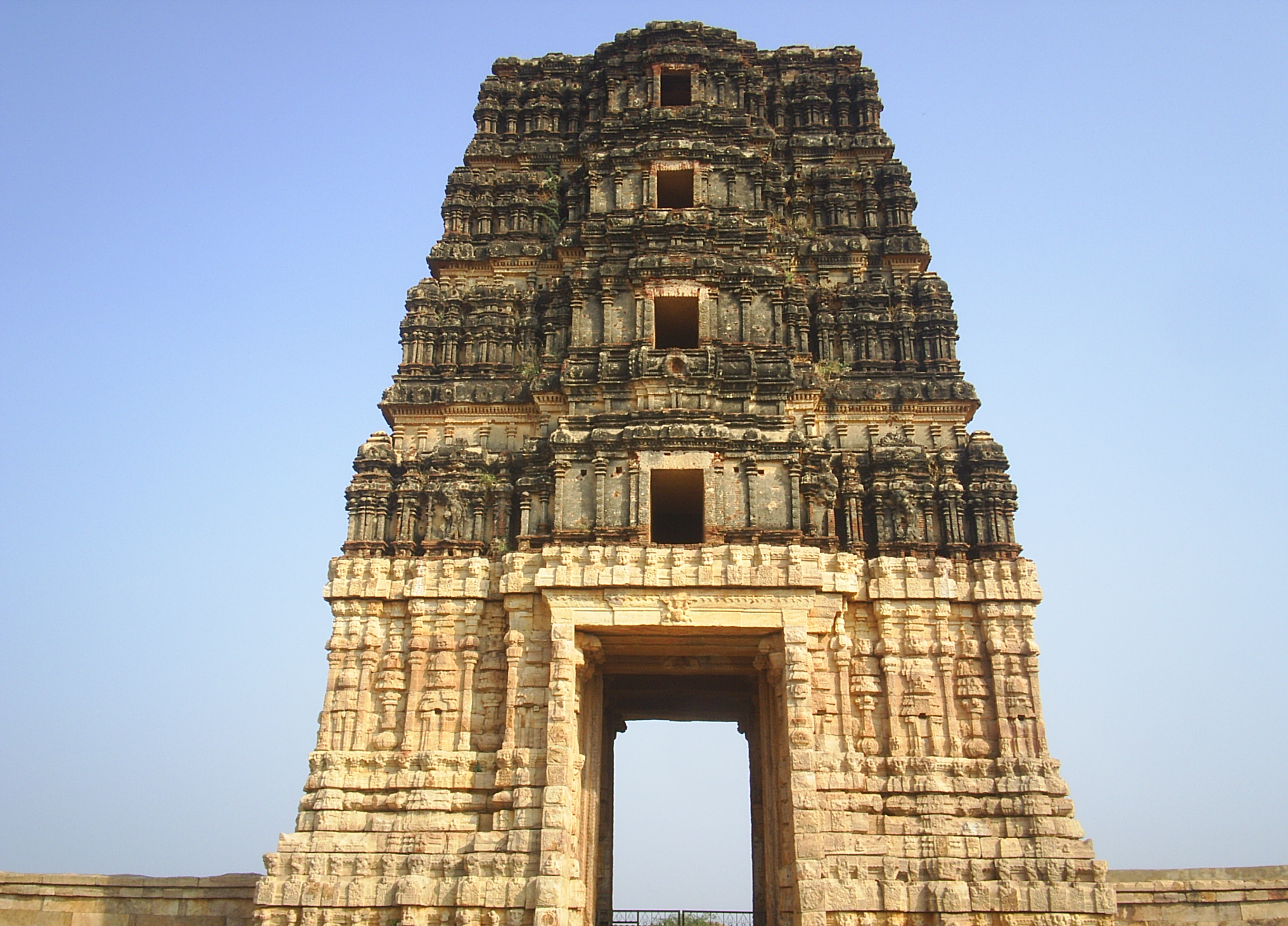
The gopura gateway

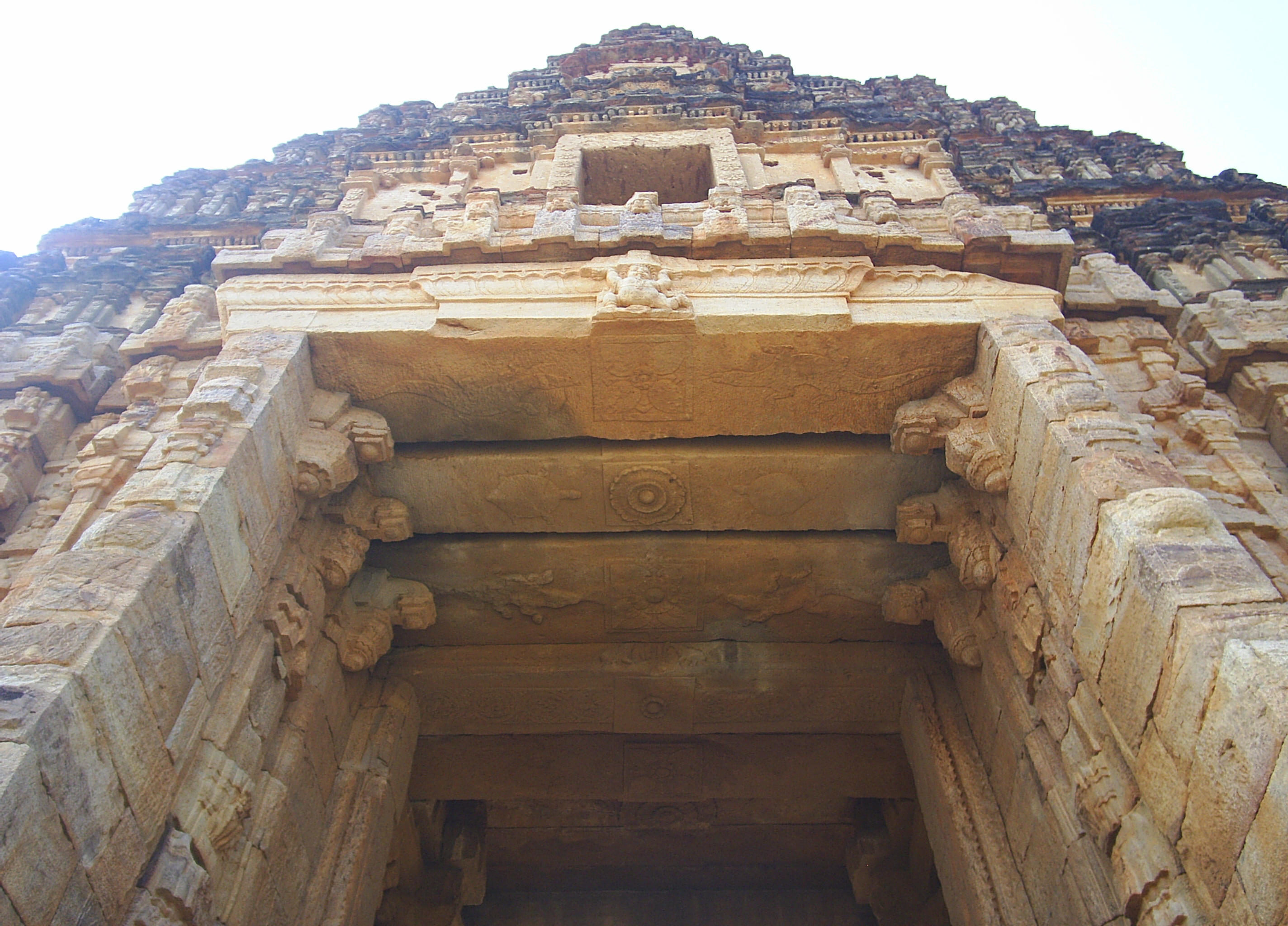
Ceiling of the gopura gateway

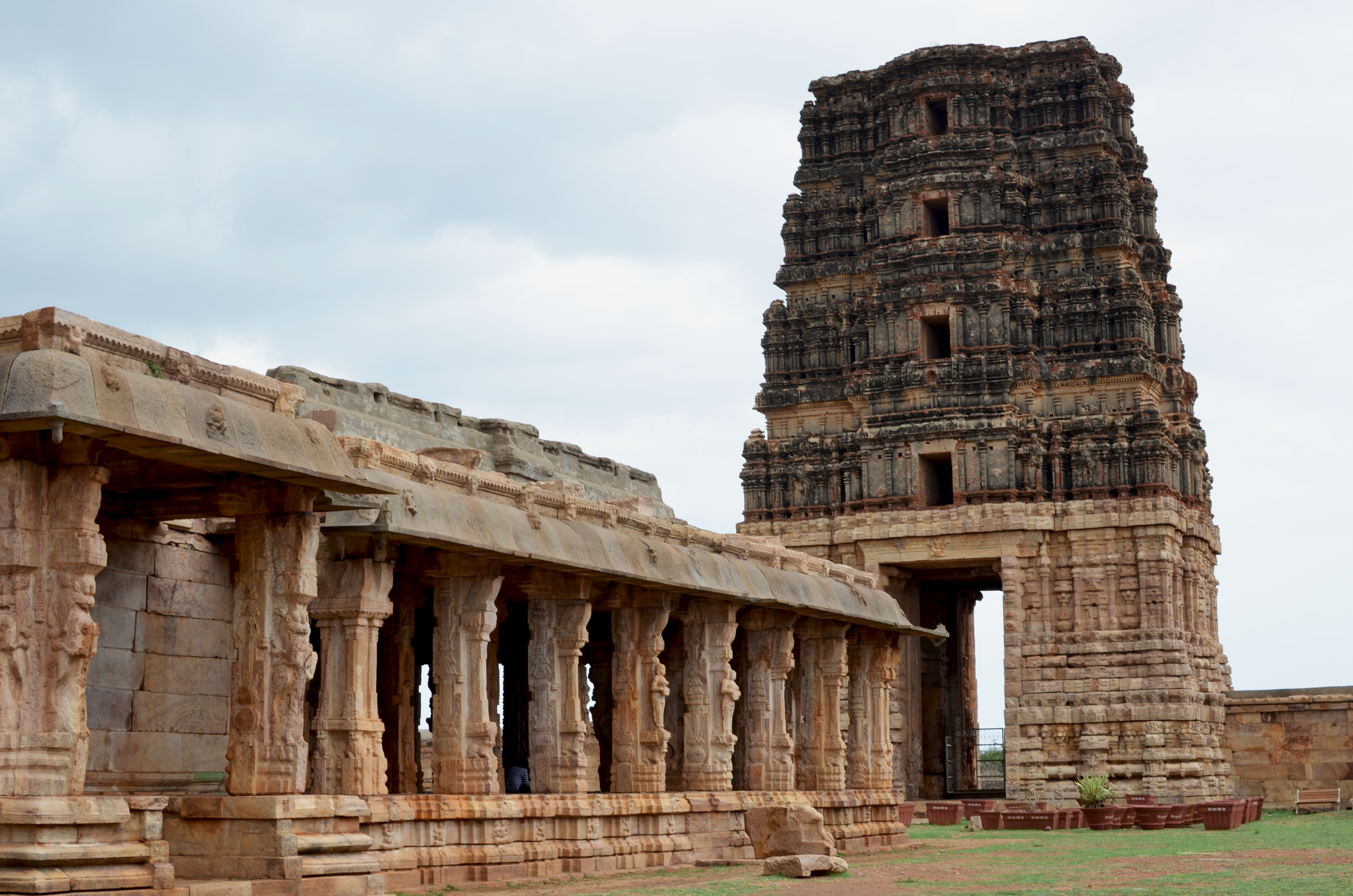
mandapa pillars with gopura in background

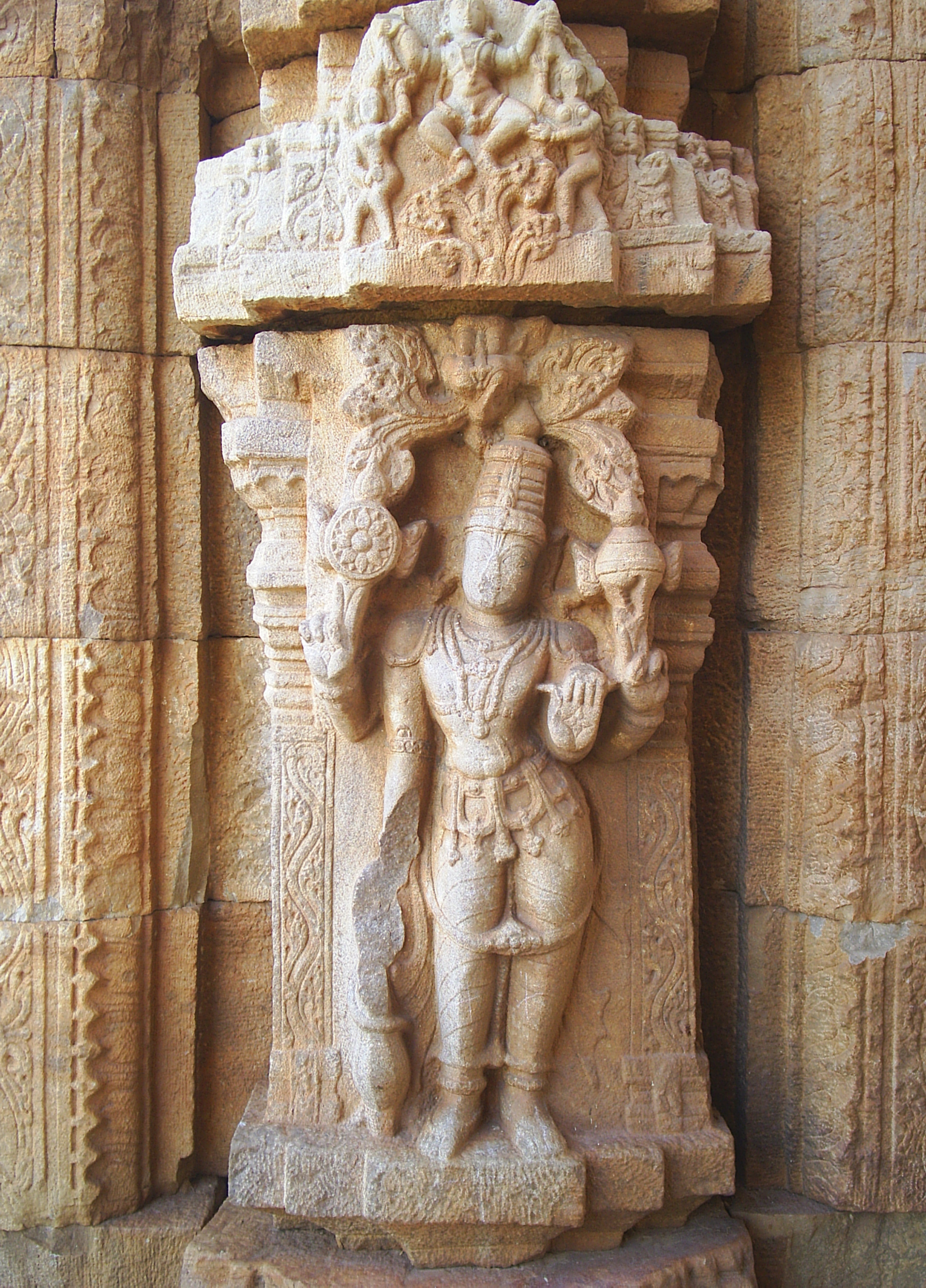
A sculpture

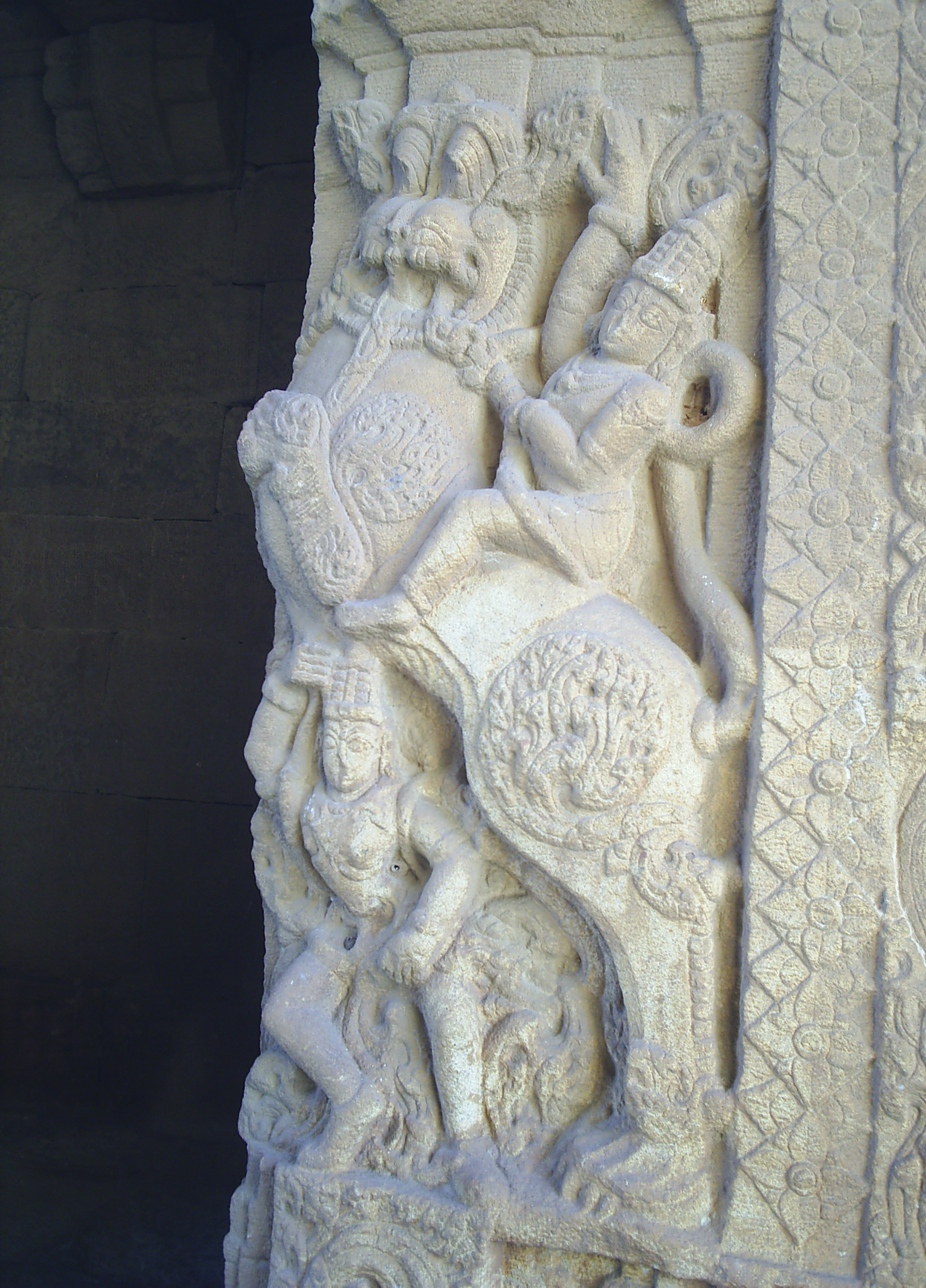
Vyala rider

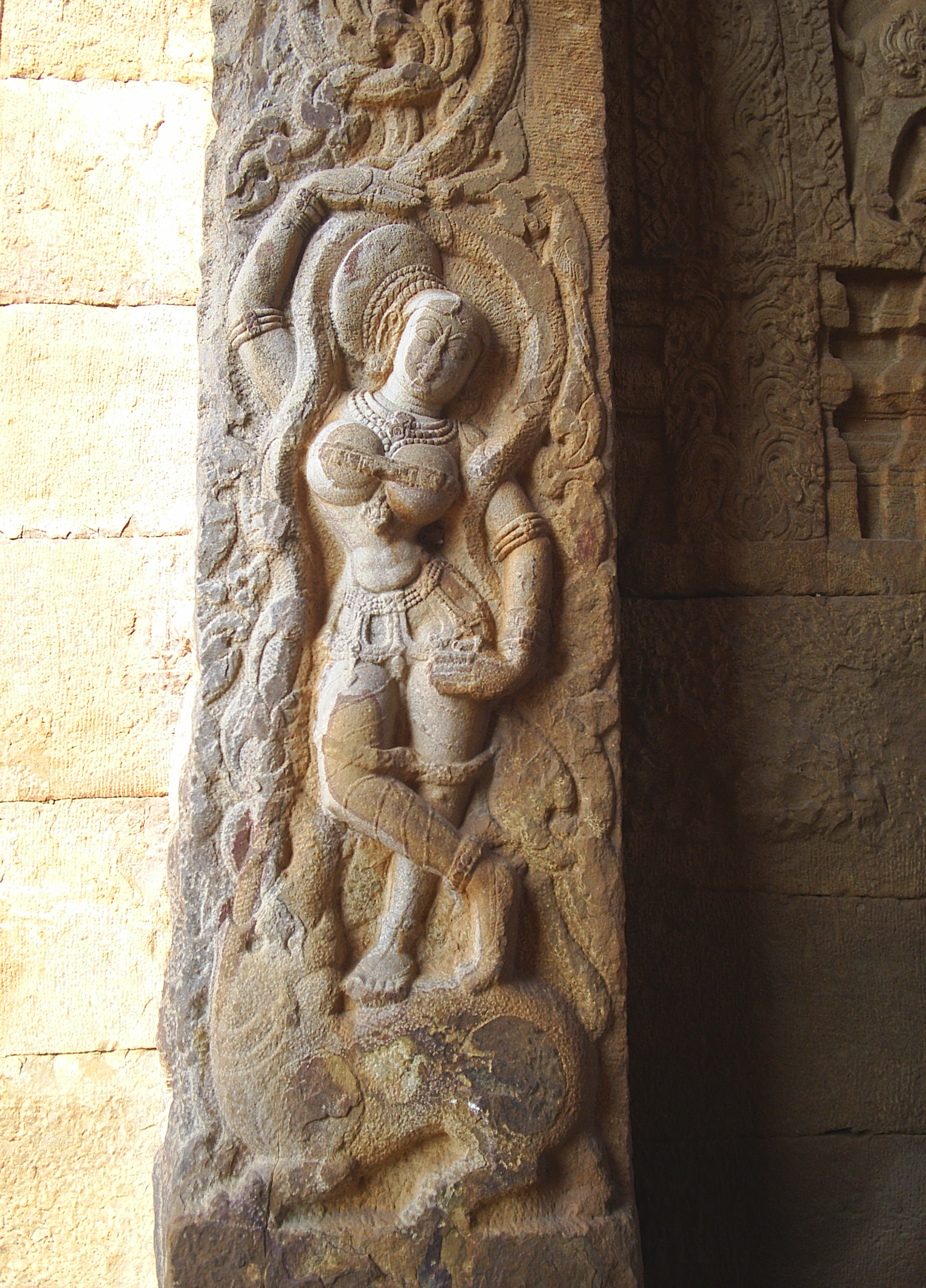
Surasundari

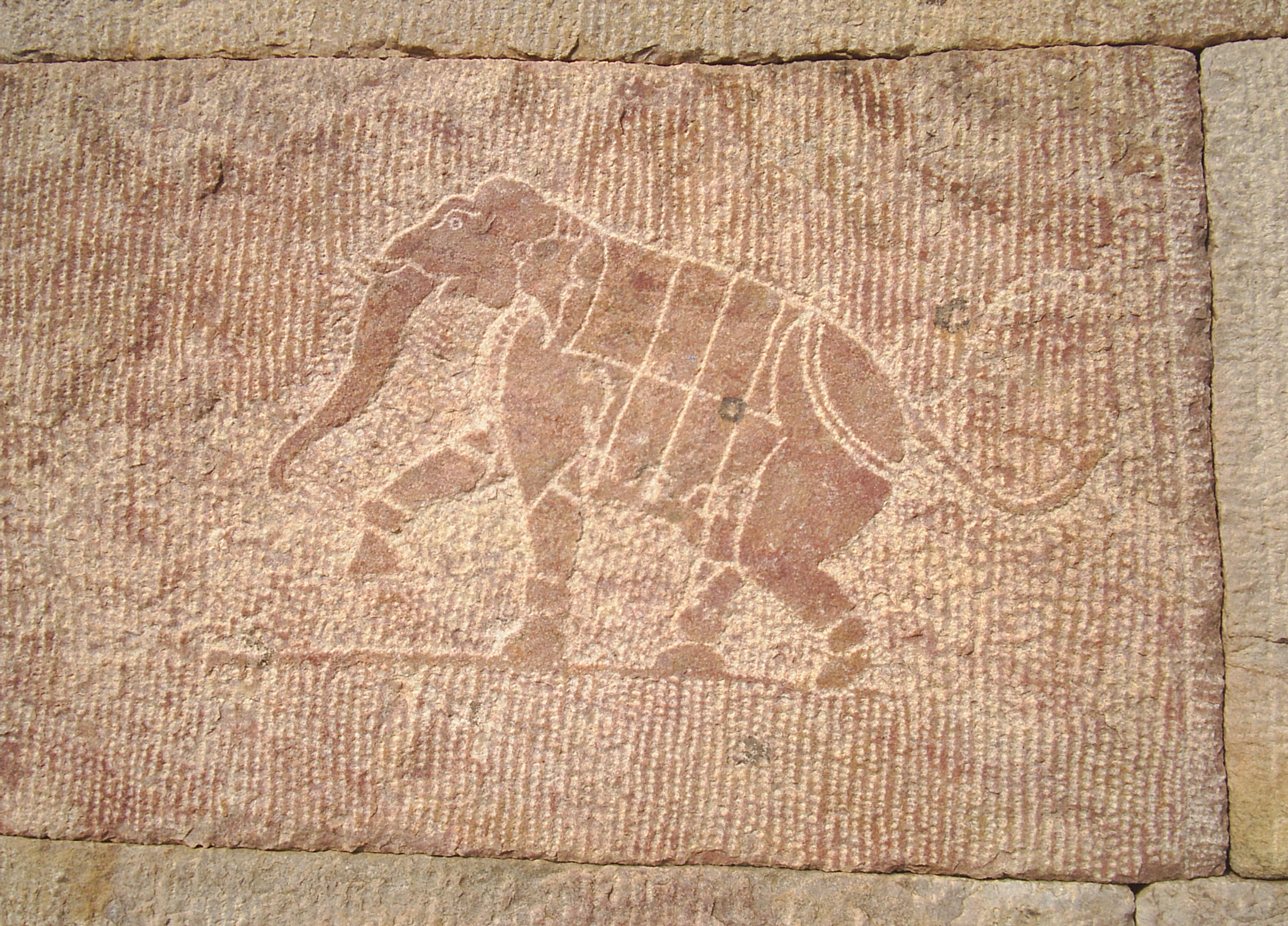
Elephant line drawing

The main temple at the centre comprises the following parts from east to west: a maha-mandapa (large pavilion), a mukha-mandapa (small pavilion), an antarala (antechamber), and a garbha-griha (the location of the main deity).

The pillared maha-mandapa is a rectangular hall measuring 18.29 m x 13.72 m. It has several decorative motifs and vyala brackets with riders. It has figures of deities (including Vishnu and Surya), rishis (sages), a woman, animals, and dwarfs playing musical instruments (such as drums, cymbals and flute). The upper portion of the beams has figures of male and female dancers, which suggests that the maha-mandapa may have been used as a stage for dance and music performances in honour of the deity.

The mukha-mandapa is a slightly rectangular hall measuring 11.18 m X 9.14 m. It has finely carved pillars with lotus corbels at the centre; a stone slab with female figures dancing as a group; brackets with vyala figures; and line drawings (including those of lion, lotus flowers, and monkeys). Its doorways feature dvara-palakas and Gaja-Lakshmi, and the ceiling has a lotus medallion.

The antarala has a doorway with carvings of creepers, flowers, lotus petals, dvara-palakas, and Gaja-Lakshmi. The garbha-griha is square-shaped, with each side measuring 4.12 m. It has a pranala set in the north wall. The superstructure above the garbha-griha no longer survives, and the image of the main deity is missing.
