= Madakasira =

- Location in Andhra Pradesh, India Madakasira (Andhra Pradesh)
- Coordinates: 13.9369°N 77.2694°E
- Country: India
- State: Andhra Pradesh
- District: Sri Sathya Sai
- Talukas: Madakasira

Area
  - Total: 30.17 km^{2} (11.65 sq mi)

Population (2011)
  - Total: 21,464
  - Density: 711.4/km^{2} (1,843/sq mi)

Languages
  - Official: Telugu
- Time zone: UTC+5:30 (IST)
- PIN: 515301
- Telephone code: 91–8493
- Vehicle registration: AP
- Website: Madakasira website

Madakasira is a town with a population 19,432 in 2001 and also a mandal in Sri Satya Sai district in the state of Andhra Pradesh in India. The Madakasira Hill Fort in the town is a centrally protected monument of national importance.

== History ==
According to a mythological tradition mentioned in the medieval kaifiyat (bureaucratic record), the site of the village was once a hermitage of the sage Mandavya. Rama installed a shivalinga, called Rameshvara, on the local hill after defeating Ravana. A Chola king later built a Shiva temple and tank to the south-west of the present-day town centre, to atone for his sin of killing a Brahmin. A village called Mandavya-palle developed around the temple. It came to be known as Madakasira, because the majority of the inhabitants were potters who manufactured madakas (earthen pots).

In the 17th century, the area was under the suzerainty of the Vijayanagara Empire and the Bijapur Sultanate. The members of the family that established present-day Madakasira, near the former village of Madakapalle, were apparently chiefs of Sira. After defeating Vijayanagara and capturing Sira, the Bijapur rulers granted Madakapalle and the nearby Ratnagiri to these chiefs. The rulers of Bijapur revoked and restored the grant several times.

In the 18th century, the Madakasira Fort was held by multiple powers, including the Maratha noble Murari Rao, Hyder Ali and Tipu Sultan of Mysore, and the Nizam of Hyderabad. In 1800, the Nizam surrendered the fort to the British.

In various historical records, the name of the village appears as "Marke Sira", "Merg Sera", "Marcassira", and "Madaksira".

== Geography ==
Madakasira is located at 13.9369°N 77.2694°E. It has an average elevation of 676 metres (2221 ft). The height of the Madakasira hill is 2936 feet from the Sea Level.Formerly Madakasira is called as SIMHAGIRI because hill from one side looks like a sleeping lion. Around Madakasira there are numerous isolated Peaks and Rocky Clusters which are devoid of any vegetation. Madakasira town is cooler compared to the climate of elsewhere in Sri Sathya Sai District, hence aptly known as Ooty of Sri Sathya Sai District.

There are more than 20 villages in the Madakasira Mandal, they are Halukur, Amidalagondi, Eguva Ramagiri, Maruvapalli, E Achampalli, Kothalam, Chandakacherela, Gowdanahalli, R Anantapuram, Chatram, Mallinayakkanahalli, Cheepuleti, Madakasira, Melavoi, Govindapuram, Jadrahalli, Karesankanahalli, Yerrabommanahalli, Upperlahalli, Haresamudram, Bullasamudram, Manur, Kallumarri, C Kodigapalle and Thirumaladevarahalli. Mandals in this Assembly region are Madakasira, Amarapuram, Rolla, Gudibanda and Agali.

== Historical places ==
Besides the Madakasira Fort, there are many historical places in and around Madakasira, including Shiva temples and inscriptions. The hill on which the fort is located has a temple built during the Vijayanagara rule. The town has recently constructed a large Shirdi Sai Baba Temple.

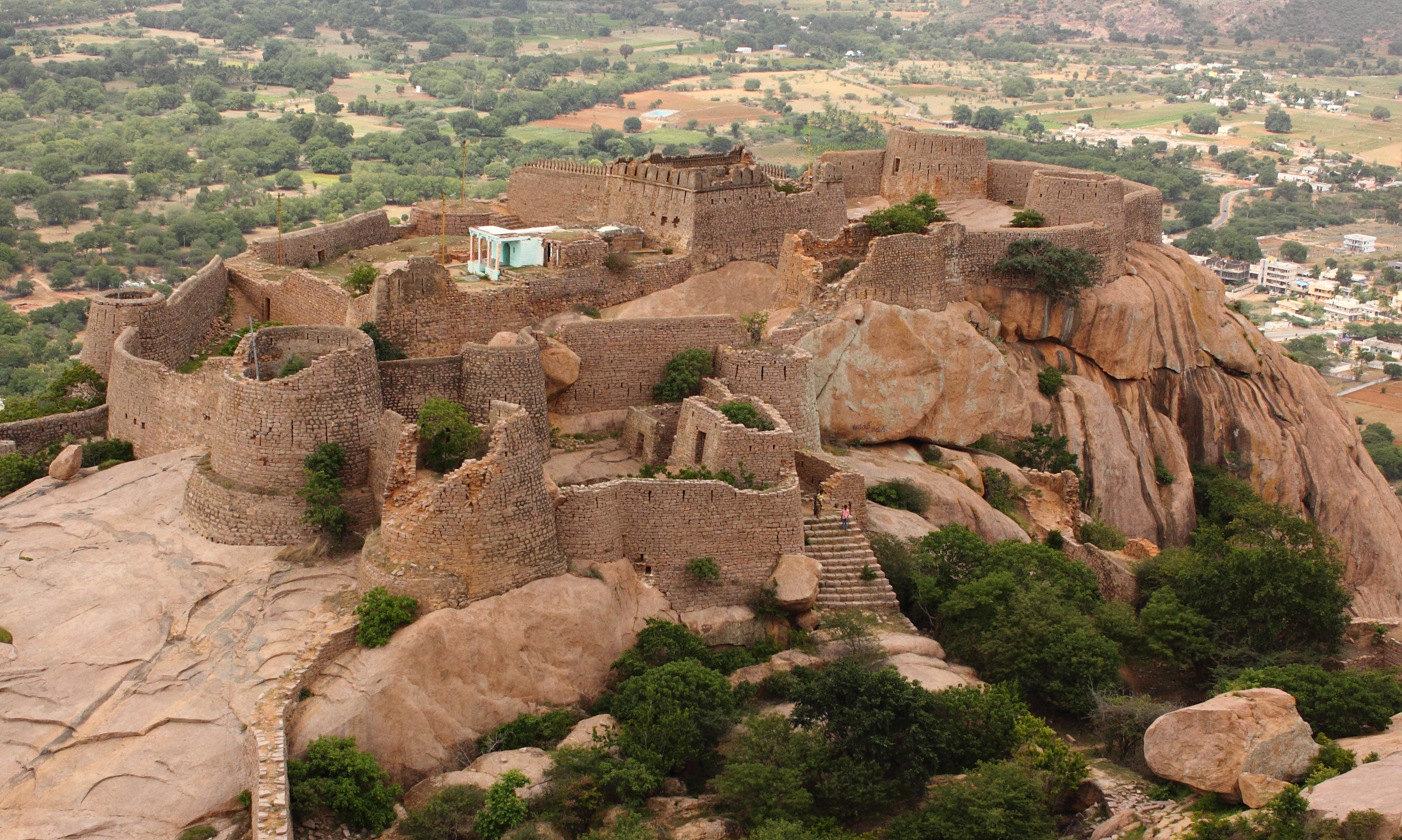
Madakasira Fort

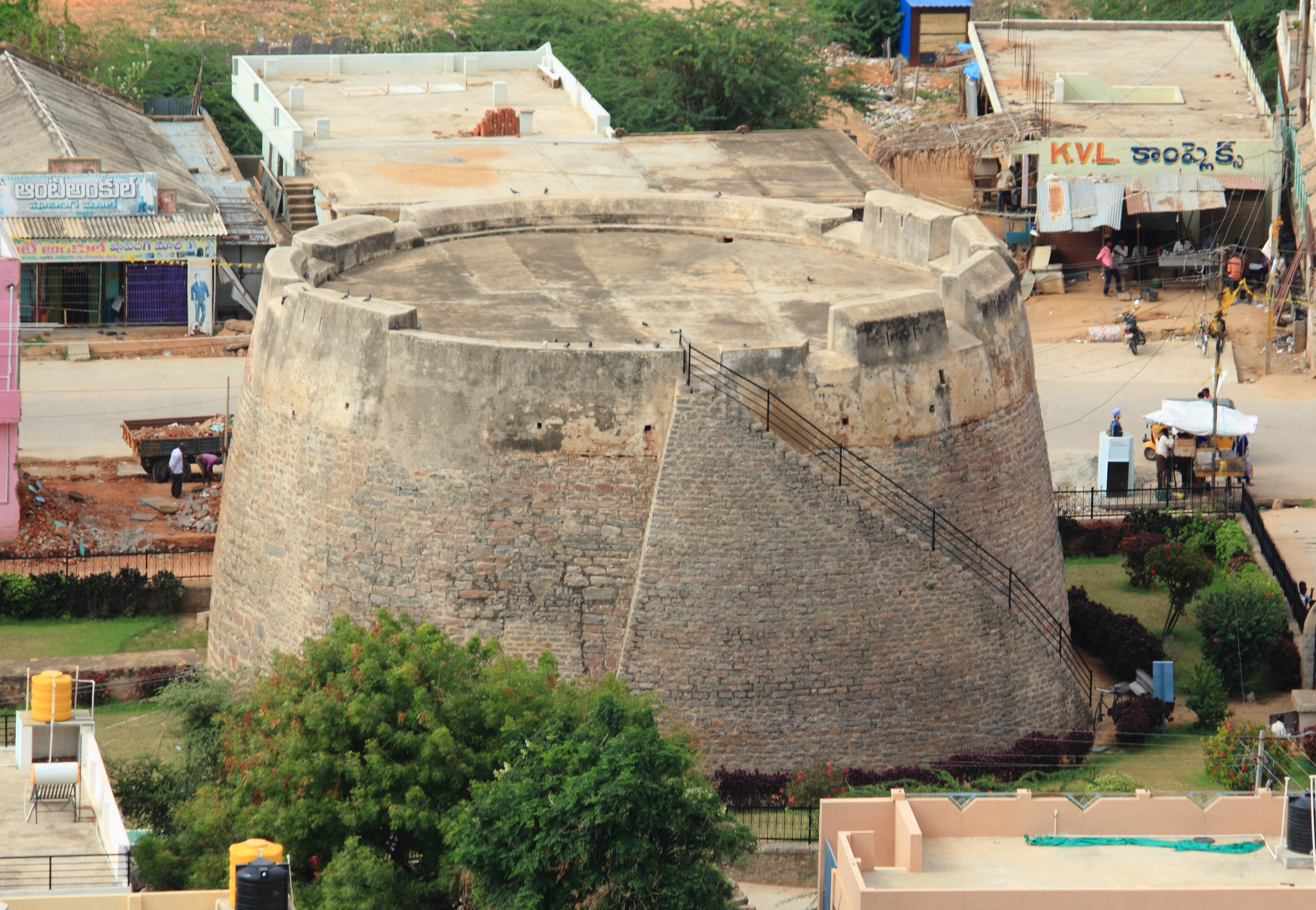
Madakasira Fort -Large bastion

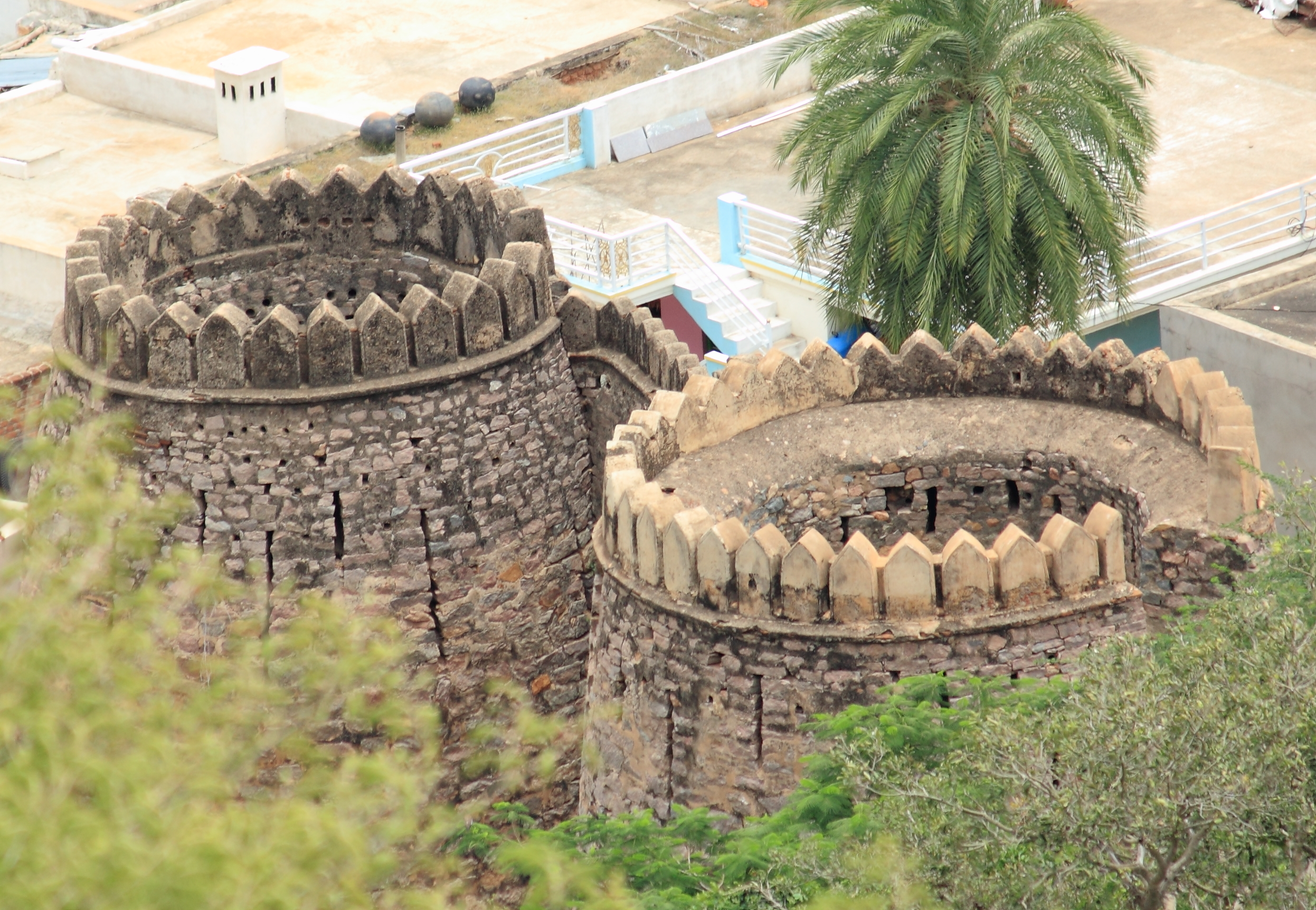
Madakasira Fort - Old gateway

== Education ==
The medium of education is Telugu, Kannada and English, Acharya N. G. Ranga Agricultural University's College of Agricultural Engineering is there in Madakasira town Near Tulasidaama vruddasramam Village, Penukonda Road. There is branch of Karnataka Bank at Madakasira

== Demographics ==
There are 120 Yadav dominated villages in the Madakasira assembly constituency.

Indian census, 2001, the demographic details of Madakasira mandal is as follows:

- Total Population: 73,222 in 15,413 Households.
- Male Population: 37,344 and Female Population: 35,878
- Children Under 6-years of age: 9,709 (Boys - 4,972 and Girls – 4,739)
- Total Literates: 34,125
