= Kotturu Dhanadibbalu =

Kotturu Dhanadibbalu Pandavula guha
- Protected Buddhist Monument
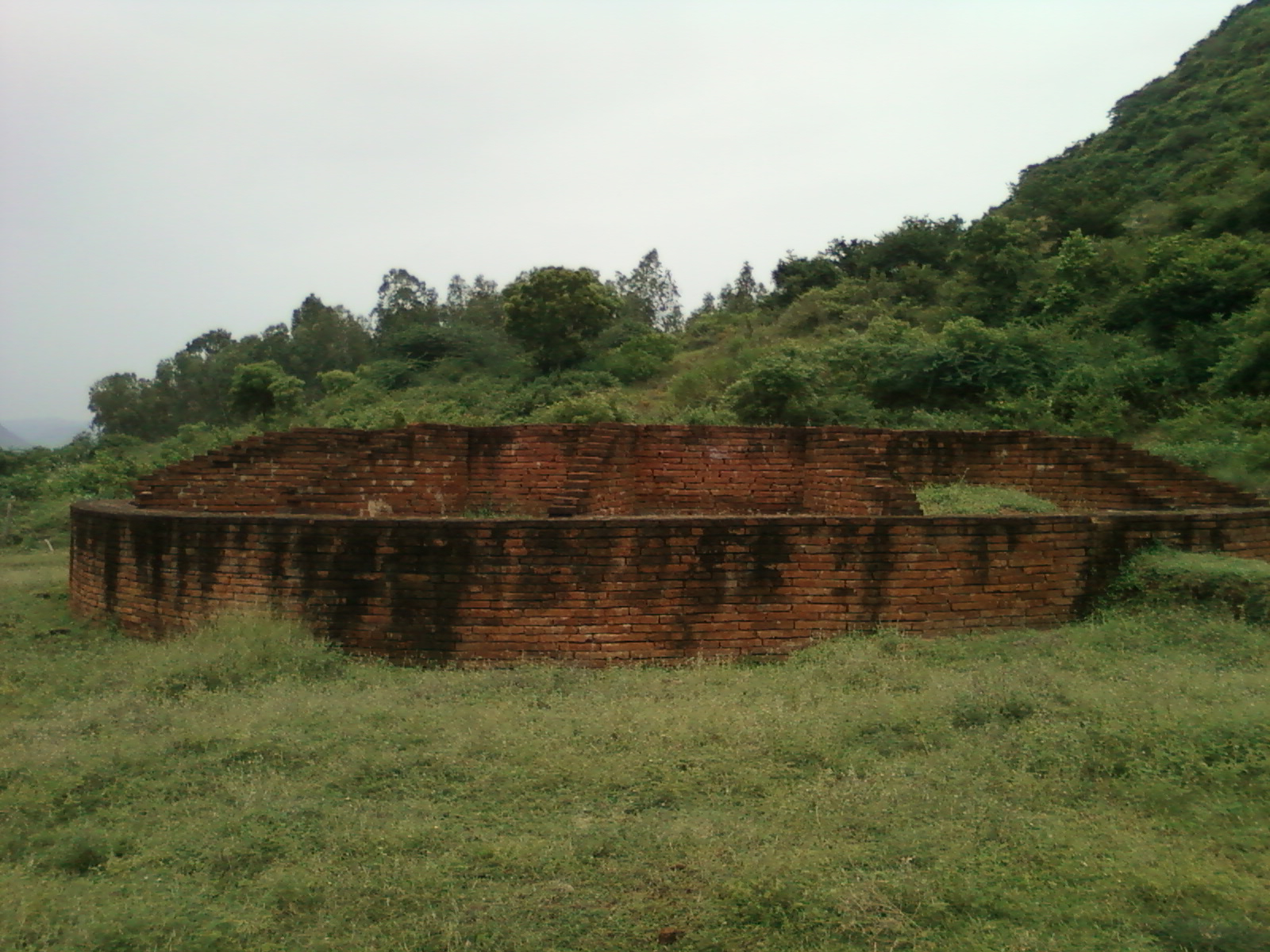
- Buddhist Stupa at Kotturu

- Location in Andhra Pradesh, India Kotturu Dhanadibbalu (Andhra Pradesh)
- Coordinates: 17°31′39″N 82°54′29″E
- Country: India
- State: Andhra Pradesh
- District: Anakapalli

Languages
  - Official: Telugu
- Time zone: UTC+5:30 (IST)
- Postal code: 531061
- Vehicle registration: AP
- Nearest city: Anakapalli district

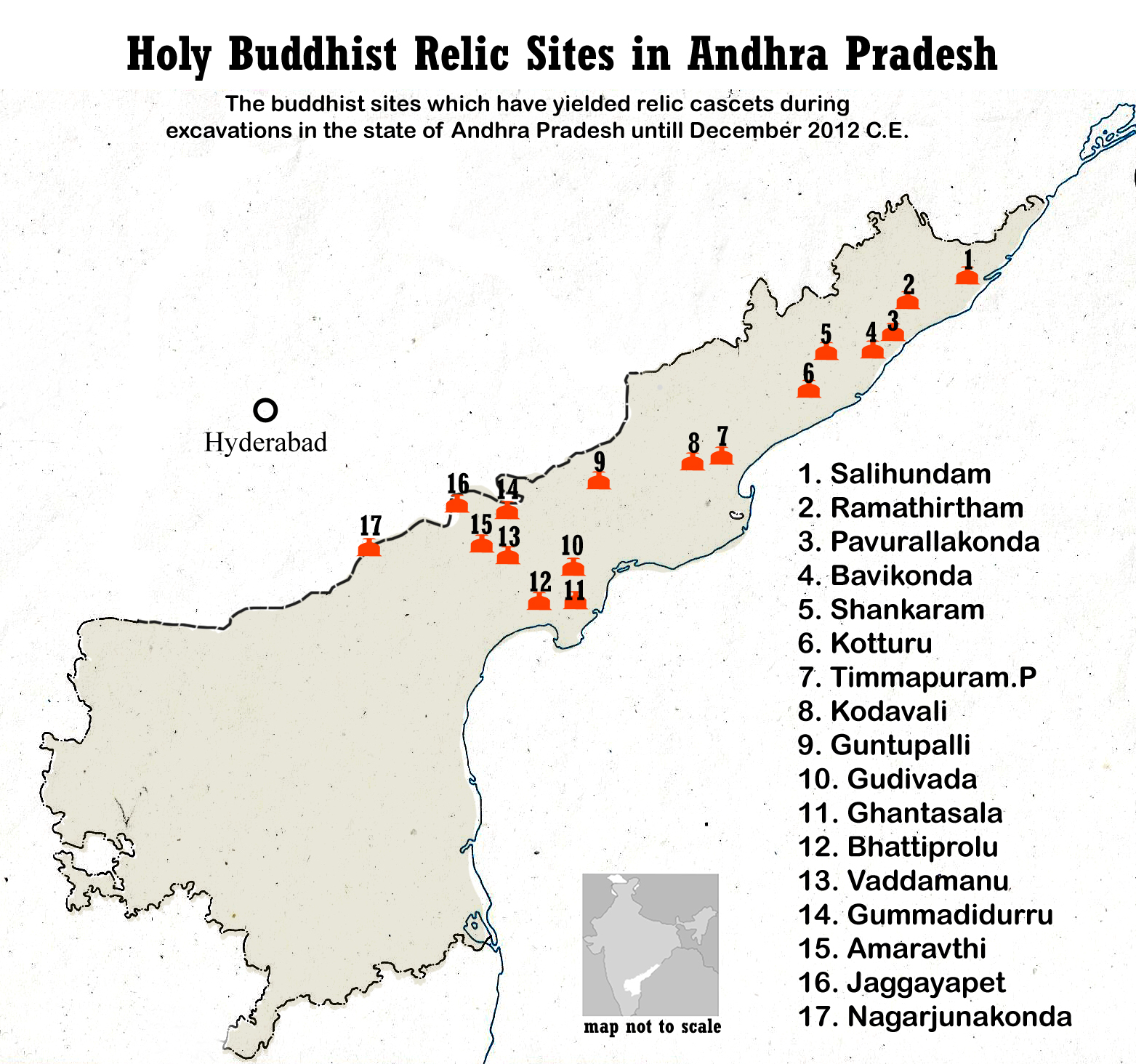
Dhanadibbalu is a Holy relic Buddhist site of Andhra Pradesh

Kotturu Dhanadibbalu is an ancient Buddhist site near Kotturu village of Rambilli mandal Anakapalli district of Andhra Pradesh. A post office is located at Kotturu Village with Pin code 531061.

== History ==
This is an ancient Buddhist remain site with a Maha Stupa and Remains of Vihara's along with a small portion of rock cut cave used by Buddhist monks during 1st century BC to 2nd century AD on the hilly forest area. It lies along the banks of River Sarada.

This place is locally known as "Dhanadibbalu".Still excavations are to be done by the archaeology department at this site to excavate the viharas and minor edicts. Small rock cisterns are present very near to the Maha stupa, which is at the entrance of the hillock and at a further distance one can see the ruined mounds of Vihara with scattered bricks. From there we can reach the rock-cut caves with small (nearly 5) portions (locally known as pandavula guha, due to the resemblance with the number of accommodation in the cave).

Many bricks of the stupa and vihara are presently used by the locals (ignorant about the importance of this heritage site and lack of vigilance). There is a fencing around the remains site presently and a garden is being maintained by the archaeology department with a sign board.

== Geography ==
Kotturu Dhanadibbalu is nearly 8 km from Yelamanchili town towards Atchutapuram.

== Gallery ==
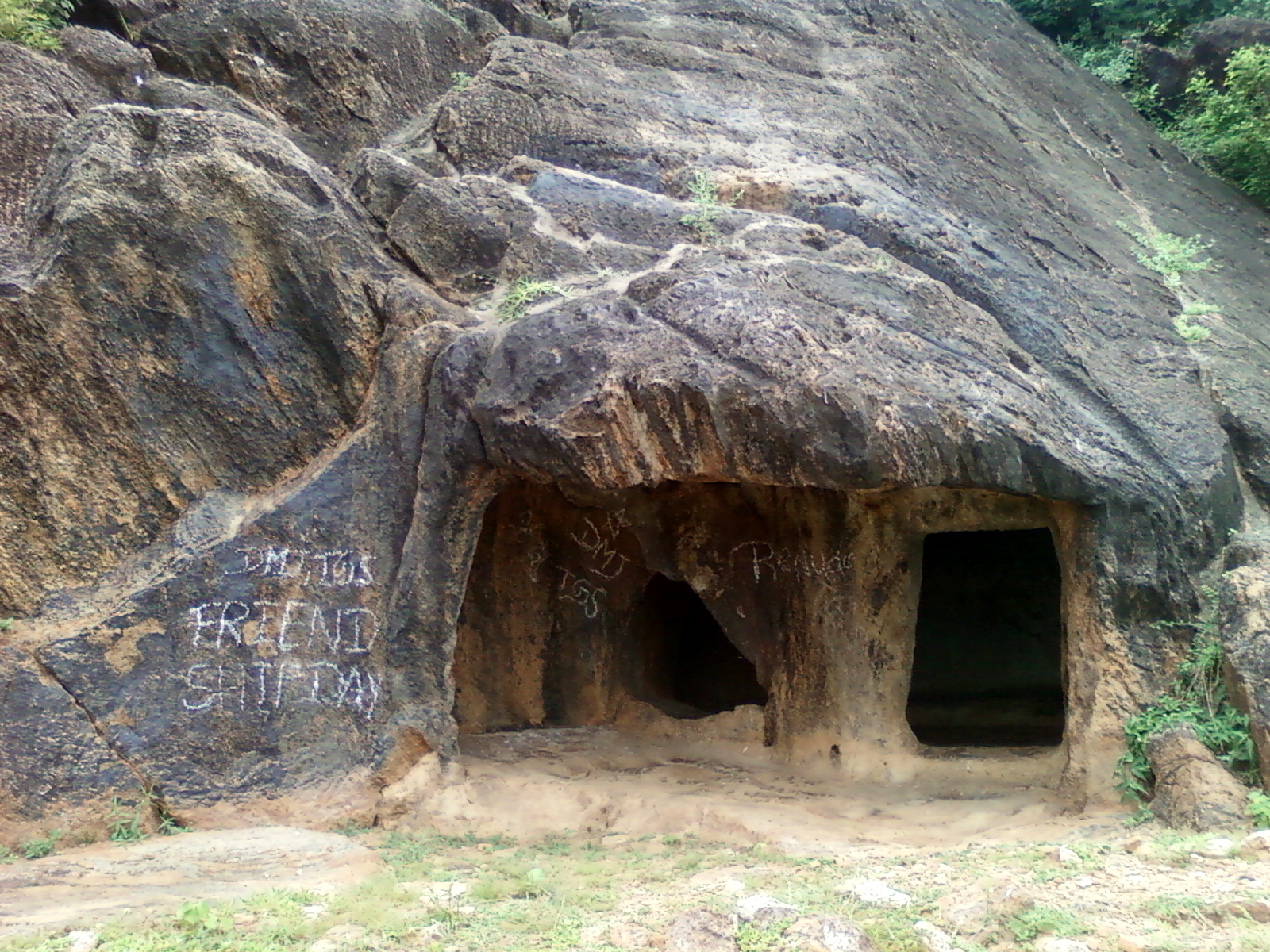
Rock cut caves at Dhanadibbalu

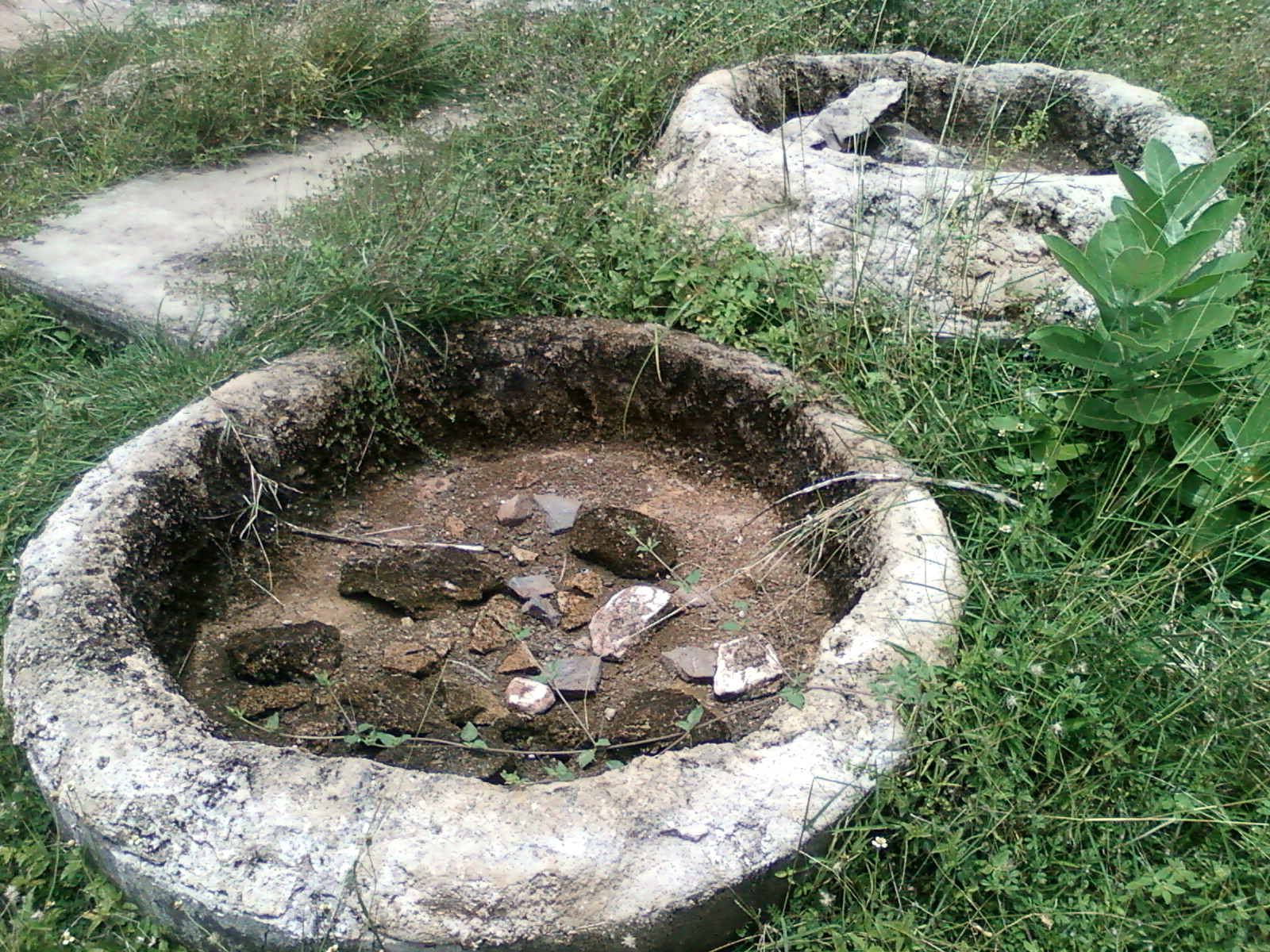
Votive stupa ruins with mortar remains at Dhanadibbalu

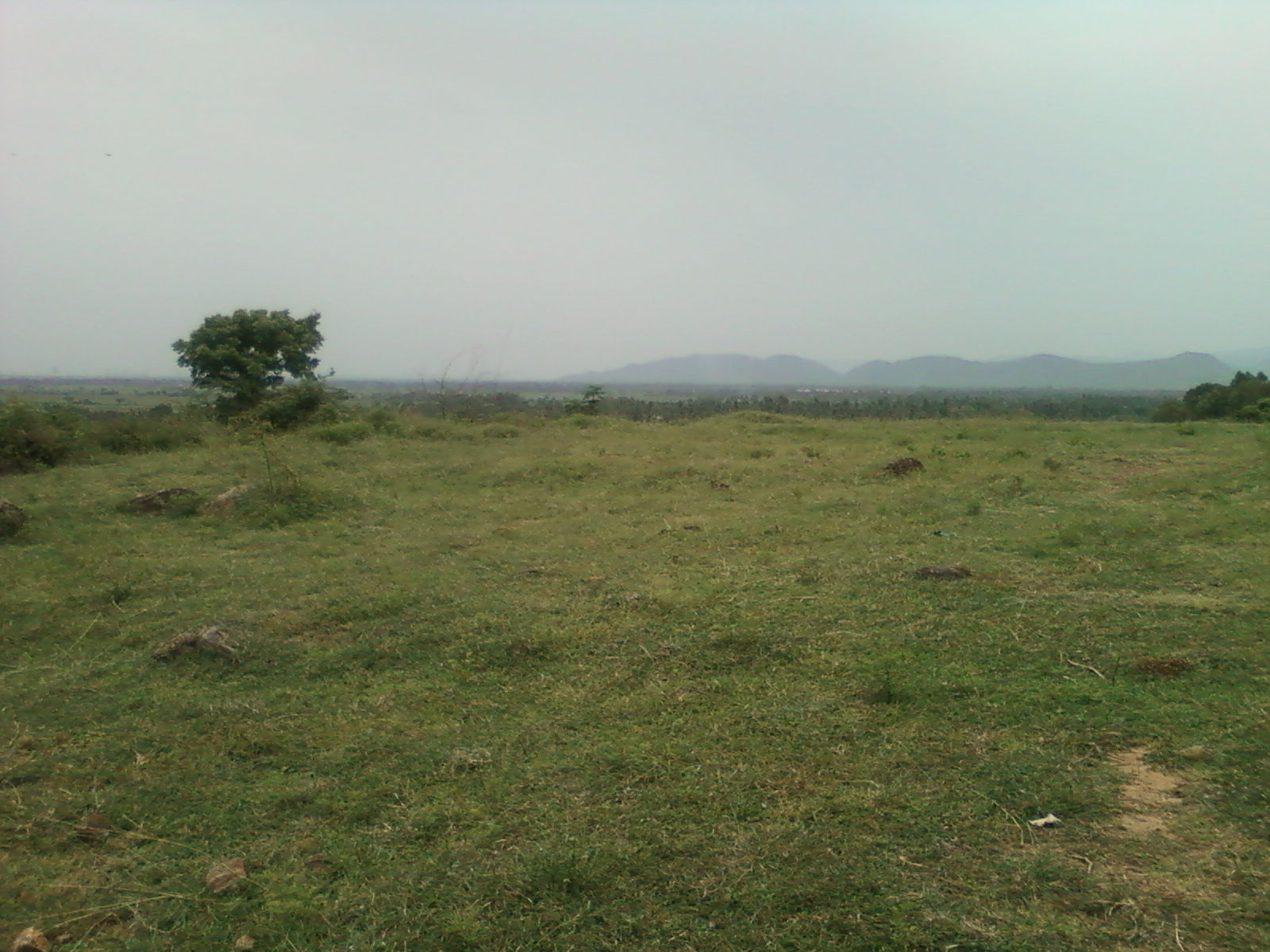
Buddhist Remnant site at Dhanadibbalu

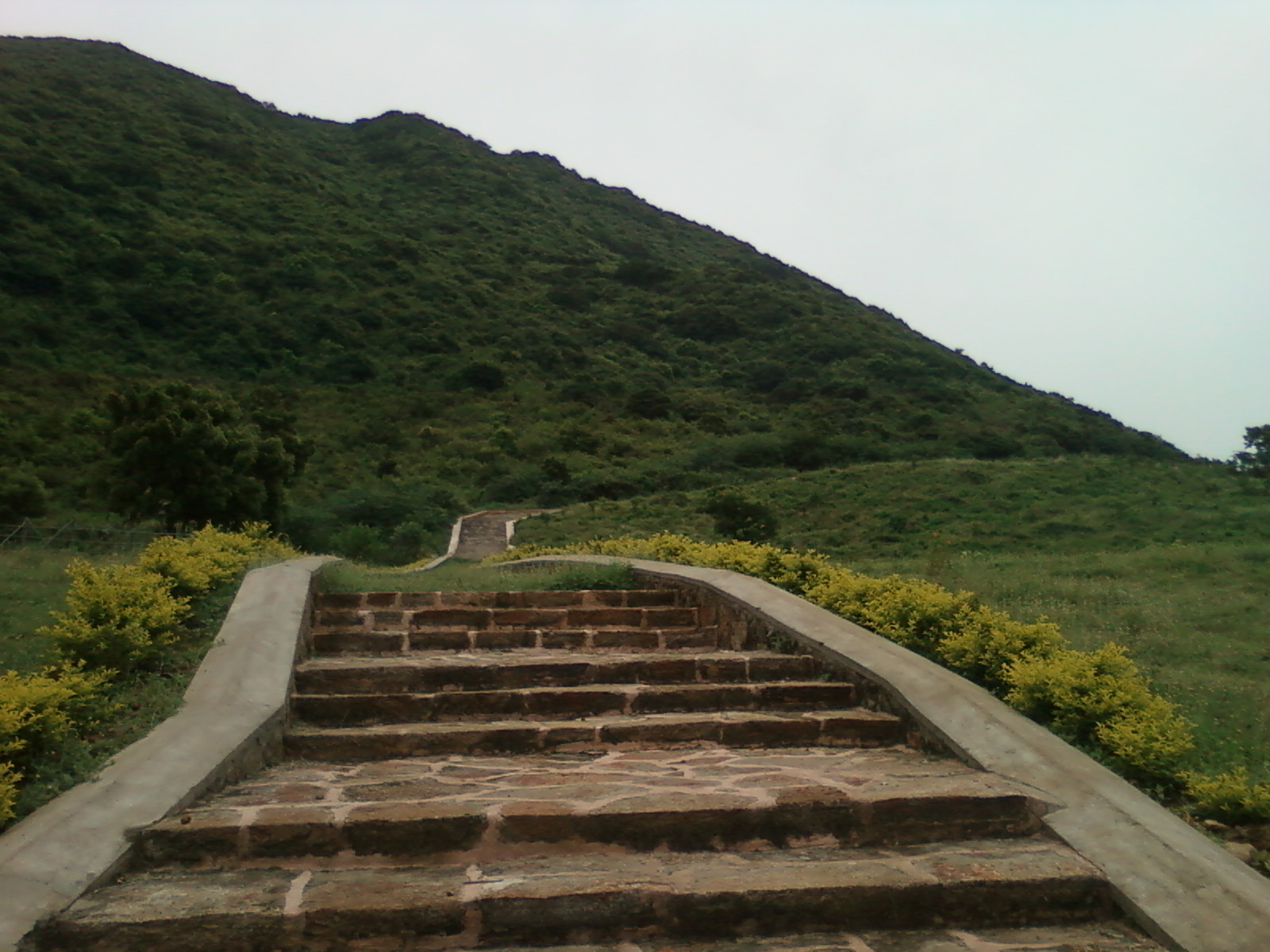
Way to rock cut caves (Pandavula guhalu) at Dhanadibbalu

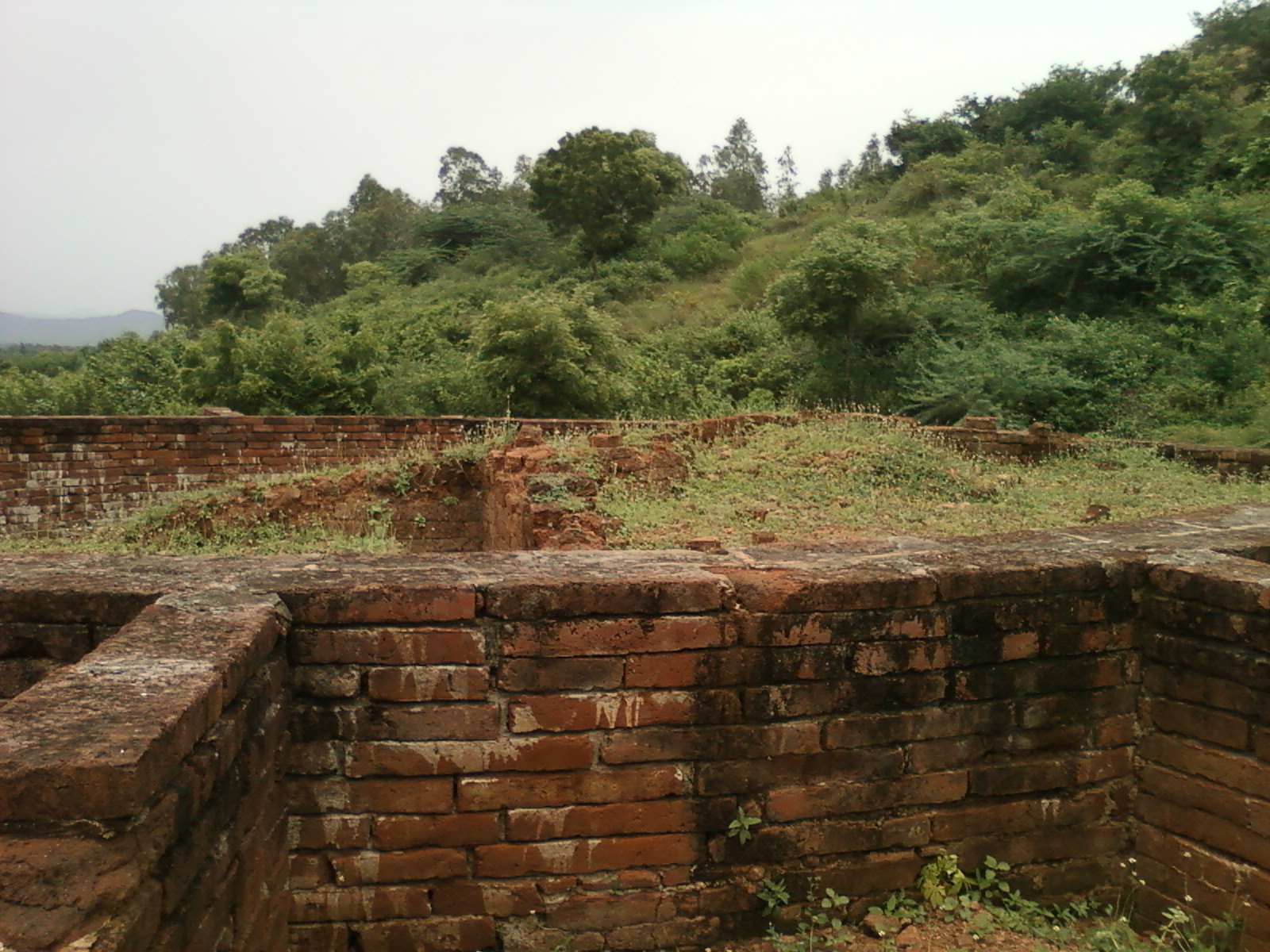
Maha stupa ruins at Dhanadibbalu
