= Chandragiri Fort, Andhra Pradesh =

Fort in India

Coordinates: 13°34′57″N 79°18′20″E

Chandragiri Fort, Tirupati
- Tirupati district
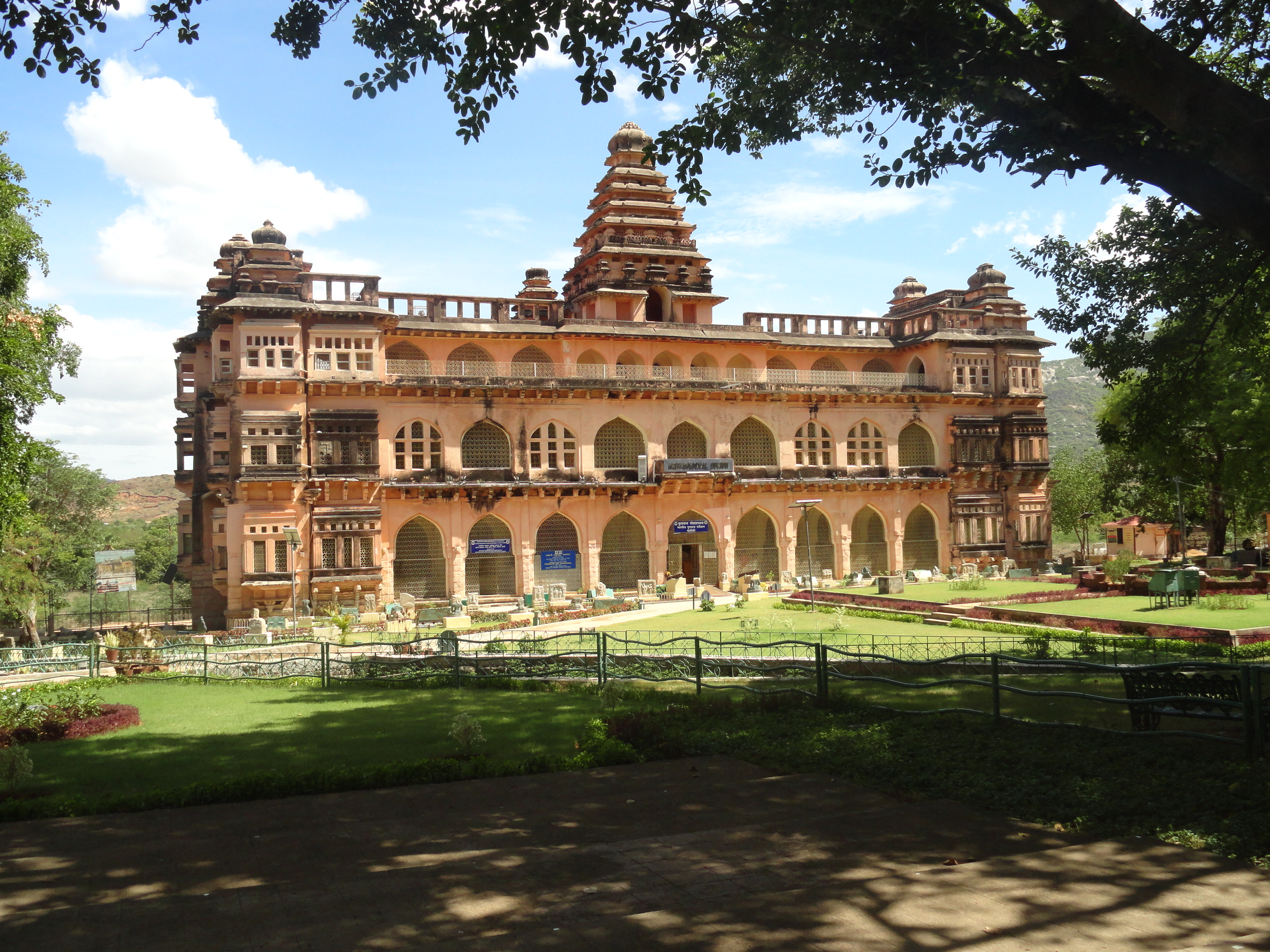
- Raja Mahal of Chandragiri Fort

Site information
- Type: Fort
- Controlled by: Government of Andhra Pradesh
- Condition: Ruins

Location
- Location within Andhra Pradesh Location within India

Site history
- Built: 11th century
- Materials: Granite Stones and lime mortar

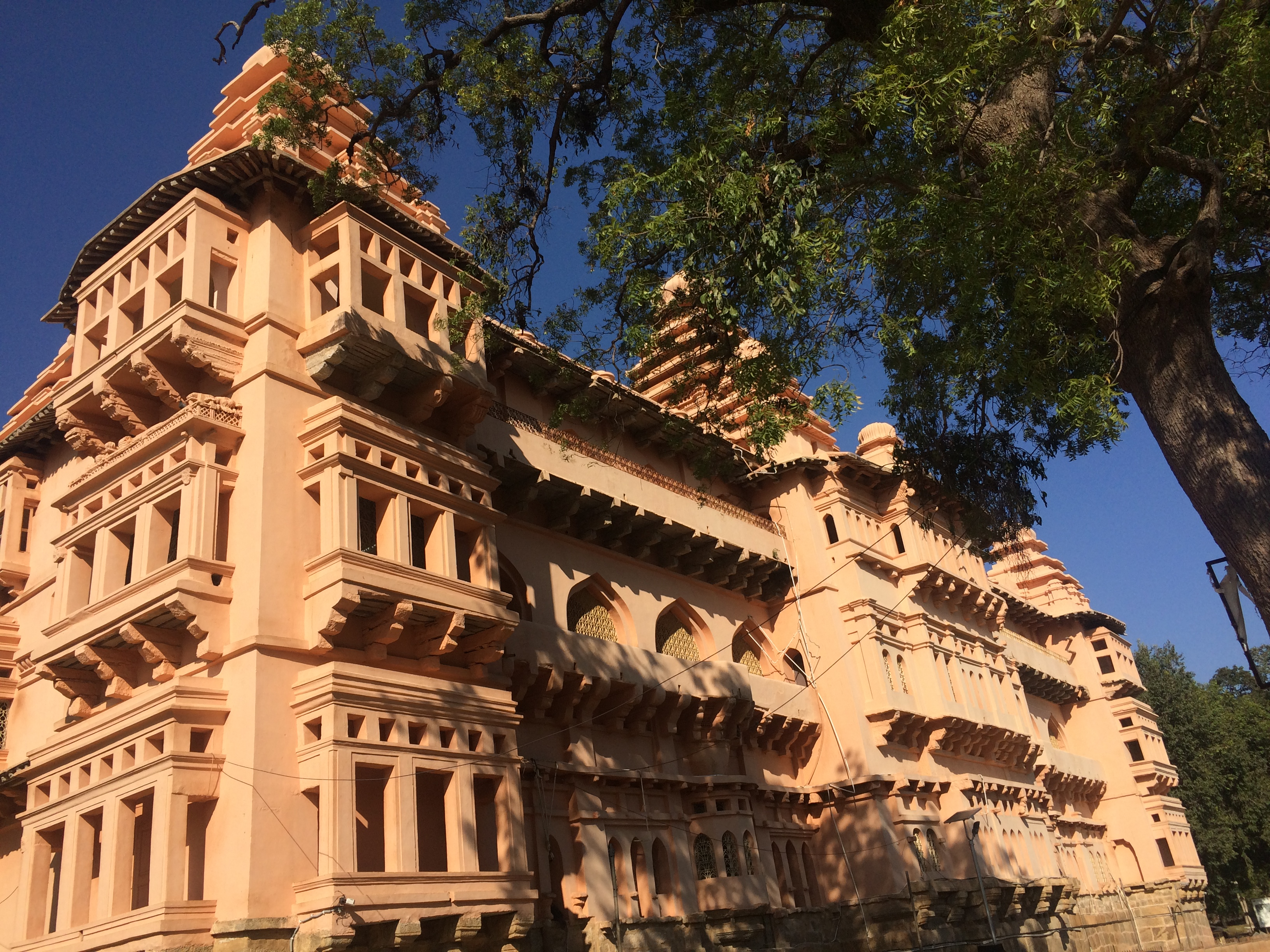
Upper Fort

Chandragiri Fort is a historical fort located in Tirupati in Andhra Pradesh, India. The fort, with its rectangular bastions and steep moat, was built around 1000AD during the reign of Immadi Narasimha Yadavaraya, who ruled from Narayanavanam. After being under the control of the Vijayanagara Empire, it was later captured by Kapilendra Deva of the Gajapati Empire in 1460CE.

== History ==
Chandragiri was under the Vijayanagara empire for about three centuries and came under the control of the Vijayanagara emperors in 1367. It became prominent in the 1560s in the reign of Saluva Narasimha Deva Raya. Later the Vijayanagara emperor Krishnadevaraya stayed they're before his coronation at Penukonda. It is also said that he met his future queen Chinna Devi at this fort. Chandragiri was the 4th capital of Vijayanagara Empire, The capital moved there when the Golconda sultans attacked Penukonda. In 1646 the fort was annexed to the Golkonda territory and subsequently came under Kingdom of Mysore rule. It declined from 1792 onward. The Raja Mahal Palace is now an archaeological museum. The palace is an example of Vijayanagara architecture of the period. The crowning towers have elements of Dravidian Temple architecture. The palace was constructed using stone, brick, lime mortar and devoid of timber. Inside the fort are eight temples, Raja Mahal, Rani Mahal and other ruined structures.

Inside the fort are Raja Mahal and Rani Mahal, converted to an Archeological Museum by the Archeological Survey of India. Rani Mahal has a flat roof and epigraphical evidence says that it was also used as commanders quarters.

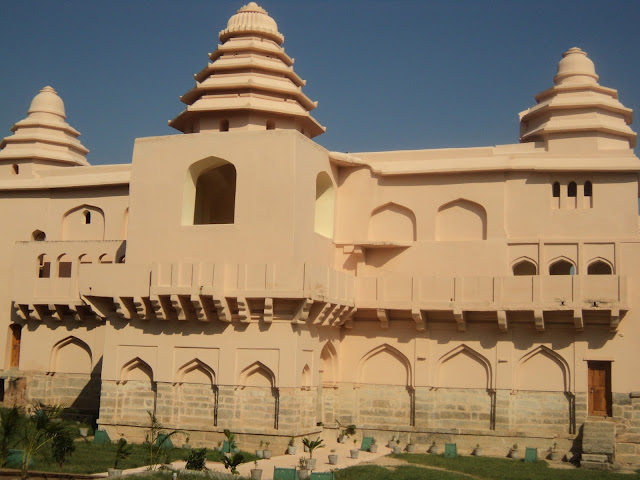
Rani Mahal

It is the site of the pact granting lands for Fort St. George to the British was signed by Vijayanagara King Sriranga Raya during August 1639.

Vyasatirtha lived there and was a spiritual advisor to King Saluva Narasimha Deva Raya and in the court of Narasimha Raya II.
