= Ratnagiri Fort, Maharashtra =

Fort in Ratnagiri district, Maharashtra, India

Ratnadurg Fort
- Part of Konkan Coast
- Ratnagiri district, Maharashtra
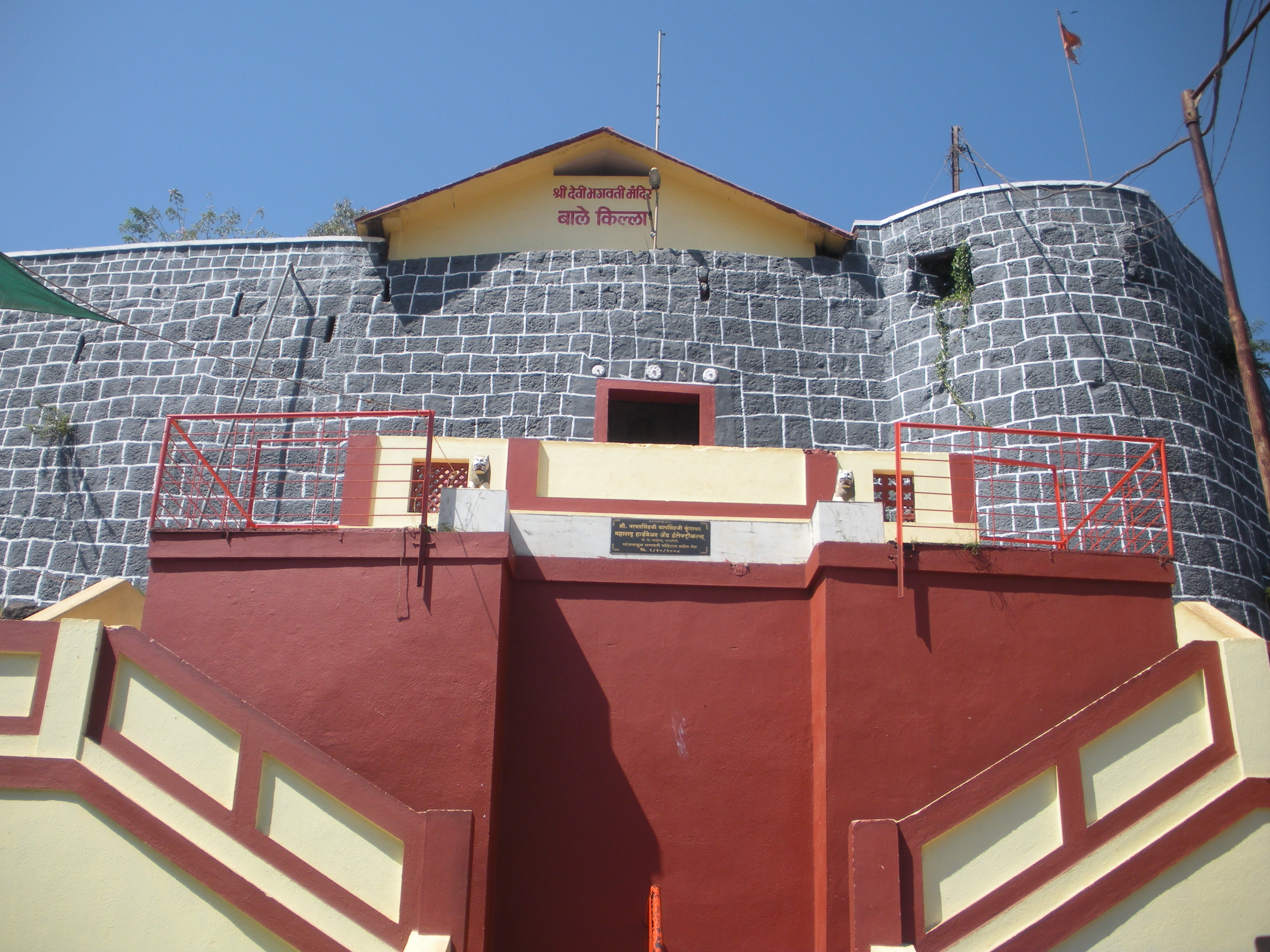
- Entrance of Ratnadurg Fort

Site information
- Type: Sea Fort
- Owner: Government of India
- Controlled by: Bijapur (1521–1594); Maratha Empire (1670–1818); United Kingdom: East India Company (1818–1857); British Raj (1857–1947); India (1947-)
- Open to the public: Yes
- Condition: Ruins

Location
- Shown within Maharashtra
- Coordinates: 16°59′46.3″N 73°16′13″E
- Height: 200 Ft.

Site history
- Materials: Laterite Stone

Ratnagiri Fort, also called Ratnadurg Fort or Bhagawati Fort, is a fort located 2 km from Ratnagiri, in Ratnagiri district, of Maharashtra. This fort is an important fort in Ratnagiri district. The fort is a main tourist attraction due to the Bhagawati Temple inside the fort.

== History ==
This fort was built during the Bahamani period. In 1670 Maratha emperor Shivaji won the fort from the hands of Adil Shah of Bijapur. Shivaji maharaj had built protecting towers on two commanding points, one at the south and the other near the old court house. The Citadel defense was improved by maratha admiral Kanhoji Angre in 1750–1755. Dhondu Bhaskar Pratinidhi did some minor repairs to the fort during Peshwa regime (1755–1818). The fort was later won by the British in 1818. The temple of Bhagavati was renovated in 1950.

== How to reach ==
The nearest town is Ratnagiri. The fort is at walkable distance from the town. A wide road leads to the entrance gate of the fort. It takes about an hour to have a walk around the fort.

== Places to see ==
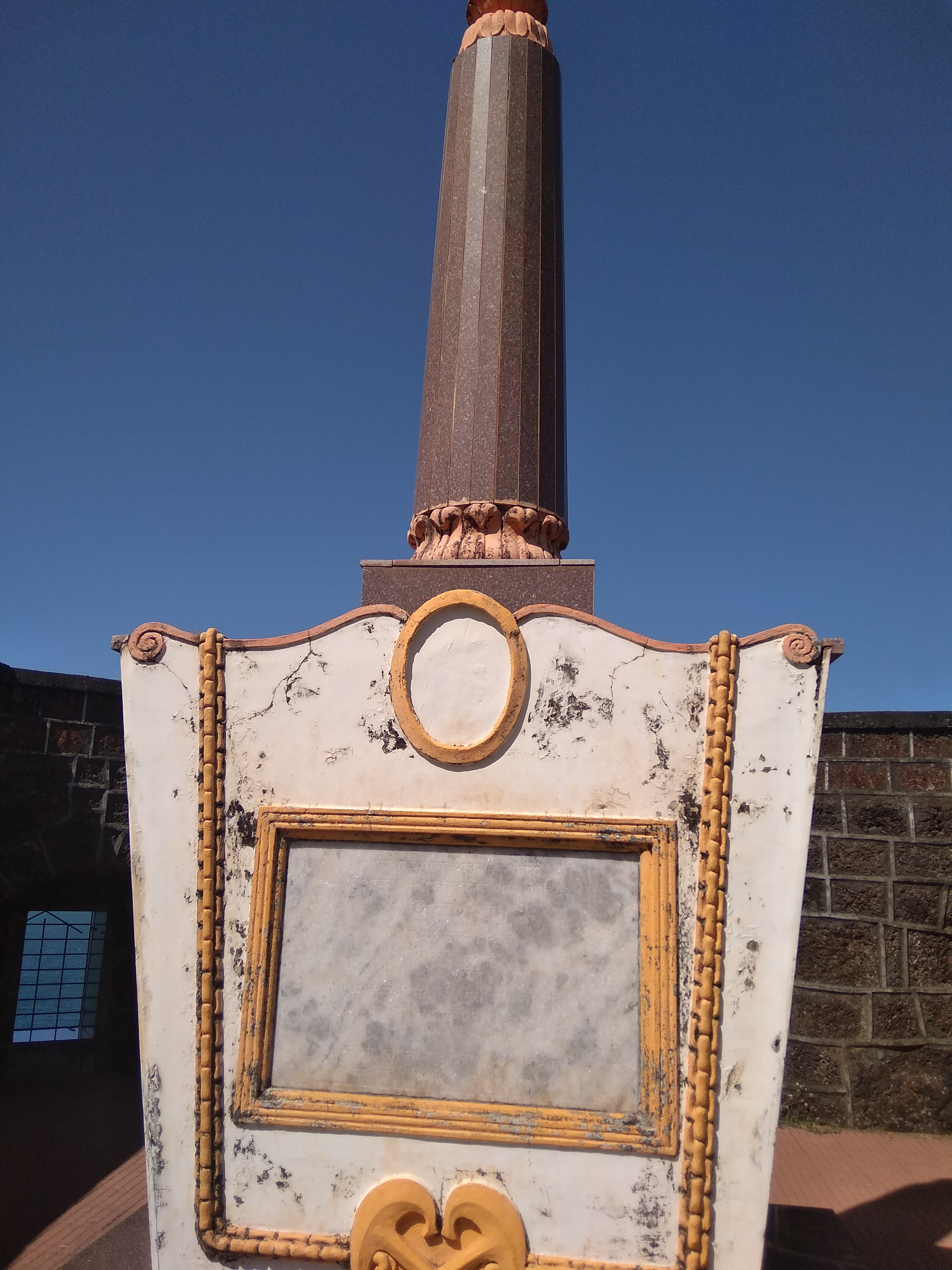

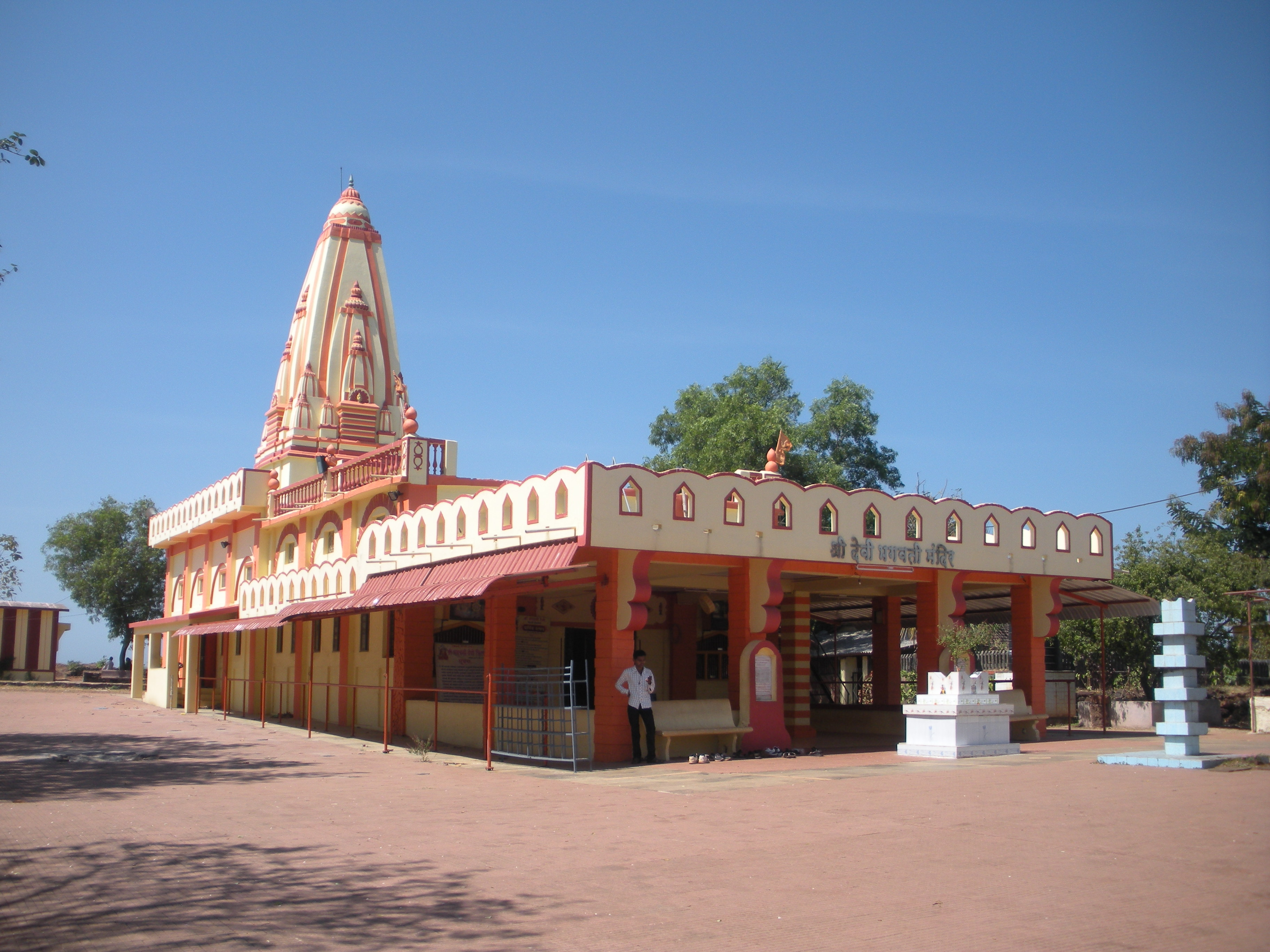
Sri Devi Bhagawati Mandir, Ratnadurg

The lighthouse is situated on one side of the fort. Inside the fort is Bhagawati temple, a pond and a well. There is a cave below the fort. The strongest of all the bastion is Rede Buruj.

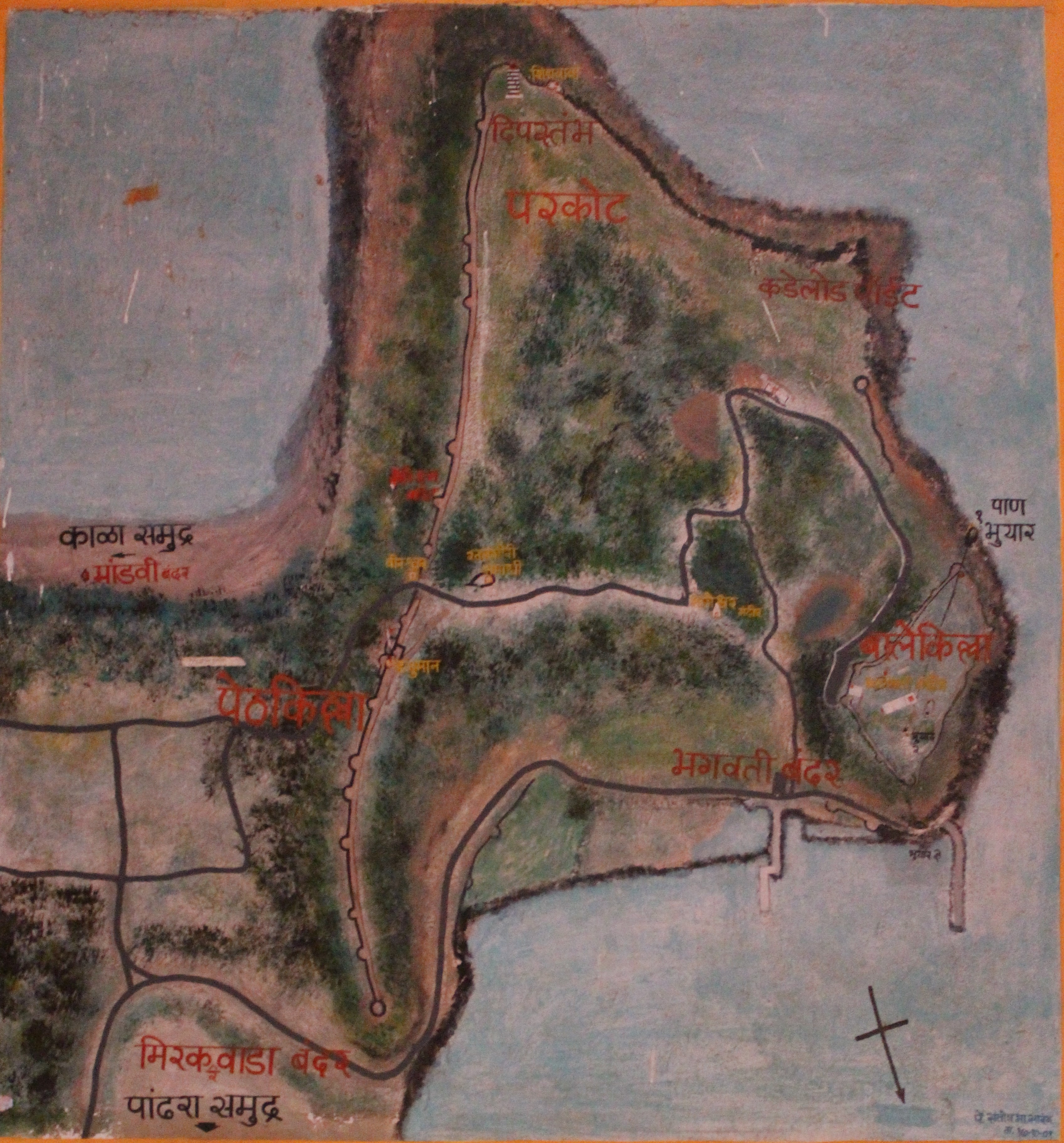
Ratnadurg fort map in Marathi.

== See also ==
- List of forts in Maharashtra
- List of forts in India
- Kanhoji Angre
- Marathi people
- Maratha Navy
- List of Maratha dynasties and states
- Maratha War of Independence
- Battles involving the Maratha Empire
- Military history of India
