= Ratnagiri Fort, Andhra Pradesh =

Hill in India

Ratnagiri Fort
- రత్నగిరి
- Ratnagiri, Sri Sathya Sai district, Andhra Pradesh in India
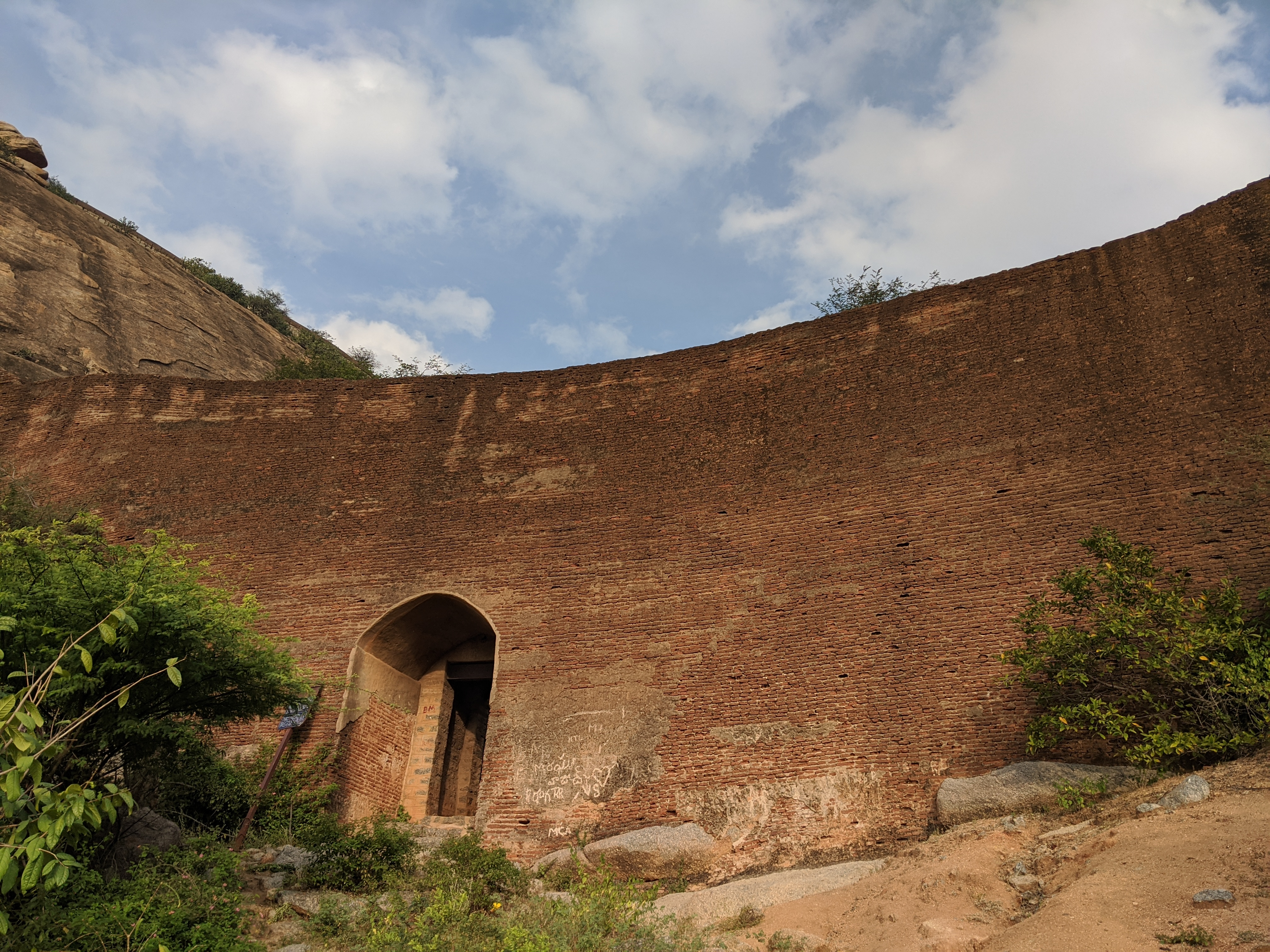
- Ratnagiri Fort

Site information
- Type: Fort
- Owner: Government of India

Location
- Location in Andhra Pradesh, India Ratnagiri Fort (India)
- Coordinates: 13.81539°N 77.12626°E

Ratnagiri Fort is a hill fort located in the Ratnagiri village near Rolla, in Sri Sathya Sai district of Andhra Pradesh, India. Located near the border of Andhra Pradesh and Karnataka in the Rayalaseema region, it is also known as Seema Golconda ("Golconda at the border"). The Government of India has designated it as a Monument of National Importance.

== History ==
The fort and the village are named after the hill known as Ratnagiri ("jewel hill"), and not much is known about the early history of the area. Historians identify Ratnagiri with a village of the same name, mentioned in an inscription of the Chalukya king Vikramaditya I (r. c. 655-680 CE). According to this inscription, the village was located in the Nalavadi vishaya (district); this district may have been named after the Nalas, although this cannot be said with certainty. The area gained importance during the Pandya and the Chola rule. According to folklore, after the fall of the Vijayanagara Empire, poet Allasani Peddana migrated to Ratnagiri with 500 Brahmin families.

In the 17th century, the Bijapur Sultanate gained direct control of the nearby town of Sira, and moved the former chiefs of Sira to Ratnagiri. Manuscripts name several local chiefs of Ratnagiri, but do not provide much information about them. These chiefs included Rangappa Nayudu, Rayappa Razu, Pedda Rayanna Razu (ruled in 1657), and Lakshmana Nayudu (ruled in 1727). Lakshmana Nayudu is described as being responsible for collection of chauth, a form of tax imposed by the Marathas, which suggests that he was a Maratha vassal.

Sometime after 1727, the Kingdom of Mysore gained control of the fort, but in 1746, the family of the former local chiefs ousted the Mysore troops. Later, Hyder Ali, the de facto ruler of Mysore, seized the fort, retaining the local chief as its commander. In 1792, when Hyder Ali's son Tipu Sultan was busy fighting the British East India Company during the Siege of Seringapatam, the local chief rebelled and overthrew the Mysore suzerainty. After signing the Treaty of Seringapatam with the British, Tipu Sultan besieged the Ratnagiri Fort, devastating it. He captured the fort after a 6-month long siege, and forcibly converted many soldiers of the local garrison to Islam.

== Structures ==
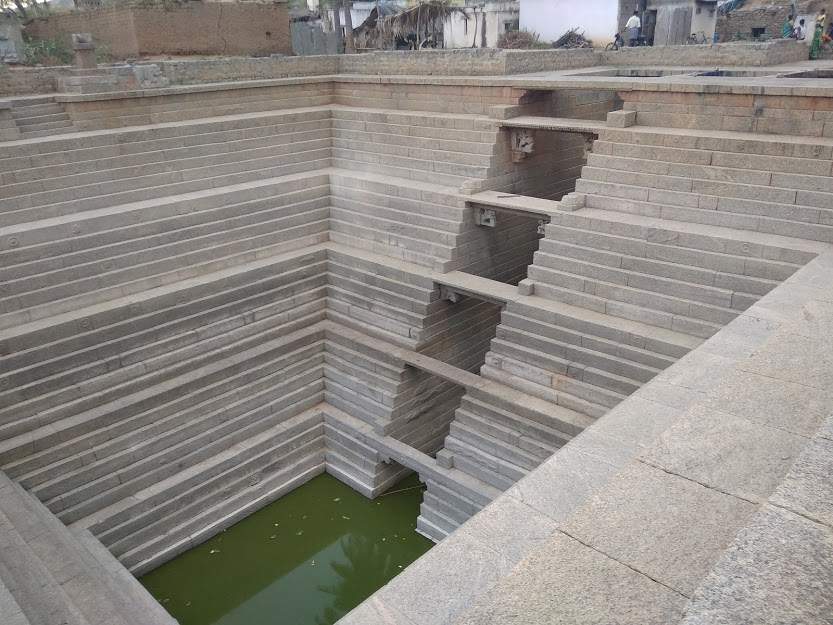
The stepwell (kalyani) at Ratnagiri

The fort spans over two hills, known as Ratnagiri and Venkatagiri. It has several structures, including the ruined Pattrappa temple. There is a large stepwell (kalyani), which was built as a swimming pool for a queen. The former bath area of the queen also has a Krishna shrine, where the queen performed puja (worship) after the bath. Another stepwell named Pala Bavi is used by the devotees visiting a temple dedicated to the goddess Kolhapuramma. An old Jain temple is located nearby.
