= Anantapuramu mandal =

- Former mandal of Andhra Pradesh
- 2023
- Capital: Anantapuramu
Succeeded by
Anantapur Urban mandal; Anantapur Rural mandal

Anantapuramu mandal was a former mandal in Anantapur district of the Indian state of Andhra Pradesh. It was administered under Anantapuramu revenue division and its headquarters were located at Anantapur. The mandal was bounded by Kudair, Garladinne, Singanamala, Atmakur, Raptadu, Bukkarayasamudram and Bathalapalle mandals. It was divided into Anantapur Urban mandal and Anantapur Rural mandal on 8 May 2023.

== Towns and villages ==
As of 2011 census, the mandal has 21 settlements. It includes, 16 villages and 4 census towns and 1 municipal corporation:

1. Alamuru (R)
2. Anantapur (MC) (U)
3. Anantapur Village (U)
4. Chiyyedu (R)
5. Gollapalli (R)
6. Itikalapalli (R)
7. Jangalapalli (R)
8. Kakkalapalli (CT) (U) [Rudrampeta]
9. Kakkalapalli (R)
10. Kakkalapalli (R) [Kakkalapalli Village, Kakkalapalli Colony]
11. Kamarupalli (R)
12. Kandakur (R)
13. Katiganigakaluva (R)
14. Kodimi (R)
15. Kurugunta (R)
16. Mannila (R)
17. A.Narayanapuramu (CT) (U)
18. Papampeta [Part] (CT) (U)
19. Papampeta [Part] (R)
20. Rachanapalli (R)
21. Sajjalakaluva (R)
22. Somaladoddi (R)
23. Thaticherla (R)
24. Upparapalli (R)

== See also ==
- List of mandals in Andhra Pradesh
