= Anantapur (disambiguation) =

Anantapur is a city in Andhra Pradesh, India.

Anantapur or Anantapuram may also refer to:

== India ==
Anantapur, Andhra Pradesh

- Anantapur Municipal Corporation
- Anantapuramu–Hindupur Urban Development Authority
- Anantapur railway station
- Anantapur Sports Village
- Anantapur district, district of Andhra Pradesh
  - Anantapur mandal, sub-district
  - Anantapur revenue division
  - Anantapur Urban (Assembly constituency)
  - Anantapur (Lok Sabha constituency)

Others

- Anantpur, village in Uttar Pradesh
- Ananthapuram, a panchayat town in Viluppuram district, Tamil Nadu
- Anantapur, Belgaum, village in Karnataka
- Anantapur, Purba Medinipur, a census town and a gram panchayat in Purba Medinipur district, West Bengal
- Ananthapuri or Thiruvananthapuram, capital of Kerala, India
  - Ananthapuri Express, passenger rail

== Sri Lanka ==
- Ananthapuram, Sri Lanka, a village in Sri Lanka

== See also ==
- Thiruvananthapuram, capital of Kerala, India
