= List of State Protected Monuments in Andhra Pradesh =

The State Protected Monuments are designated by the Archaeological Survey of India (ASI). The state governments of India are authorised to maintain, protect and promote the State Protected Monuments. This list documents the State Protected Monuments in the Indian state of Andhra Pradesh, as officially reported by the ASI. The monument identifiers consist of an abbreviation representing the subdivision of the list (state and ASI circle) followed by a numerical designation, as published on the ASI's website. A total of 500 State Protected Monuments have been recognized by the ASI in Andhra Pradesh. In addition to these, Monuments of National Importance in the state are also noteworthy.

== List of state protected monuments ==
SL. No.	Description	Location	Address	District	Coordinates	Image
S-AP-36	Old Fort (Sri Ranganayani Fort); 10th century AD	Patnam near Kadiri		Sri Satya Sai	14°14′11″N 78°05′48″E	Upload Photo
S-AP-37	Gaganmahal (Summer palace of Vijayanagara Raja’s); 15th century AD	Penukonda		Sri Satya Sai	14°04′44″N 77°35′38″E	Upload Photo
S-AP-38	Hill Fort known as Pallikonda Kambam Narasimha Swamy Konda and Rallagutta - constituted during the Vijayanagara empire.	Konakondla, Vajrakaruru		Anantapur		Upload Photo
S-AP-39	Jaina temple 14th century AD	Kambadur		Anantapur	14°21′04″N 77°13′44″E	Upload Photo
S-AP-40	Sri Kona Ranganatha Swamy temple 16th century AD	Allurkona, Tadipatri		Anantapur	14°56′32″N 78°04′31″E	Sri Kona Ranganatha Swamy temple 16th century AD
S-AP-41	Sri Chennakesava Swamy temple 16th century AD	Chukkalur, Tadipatri		Anantapur	14°56′50″N 77°59′02″E	Upload Photo
S-AP-42	Sri Chennakesava Swamy temple 16th century AD	Patnam near Kadiri		Sri Satya Sai	14°14′10″N 78°05′48″E	Upload Photo
S-AP-43	Akkammavarigudi; 16th century AD	Kambadur		Anantapur		Upload Photo
S-AP-44	Laxminarsimha Swamy temple 16th century AD	Kadiri		Sri Satya Sai	18°03′50″N 78°34′24″E	Upload Photo
S-AP-45	Pasupathinatha Temple; 16th century AD	Chadam (Bondakal), Rayadurg		Anantapur	14°45′03″N 76°51′33″E	Upload Photo
S-AP-46	Jaina Basadi Temple; 7th century AD	Amarapuram		Sri Satya Sai	14°08′21″N 76°59′06″E	Upload Photo
S-AP-47	Chennakesava Swamy temple 16th century AD	Kadavakallu, Putluru		Anantapur	14°48′46″N 77°55′24″E	Upload Photo
S-AP-48	Maheswara Swamy temple 15th century AD	Shivara, Amarapuram		Sri Satya Sai	14°01′50″N 77°01′33″E	Upload Photo
S-AP-49	Kundurpi Fort; 13th century AD	Kundurpi		Anantapur	14°18′04″N 77°01′59″E	Upload Photo
S-AP-50	Bheemeswaraswamy temple 15th century AD	Gadekallu, Vidapanakallu		Anantapur	15°07′16″N 77°14′36″E	Upload Photo
S-AP-51	Ancient Well; 15th Century A.D	Nittur, Yadiki		Anantapur	15°02′23″N 77°56′54″E	Upload Photo
S-AP-52	Chennakesavaswamy temple 16th century AD	Kummathi, Peddapappuru		Anantapur	14°58′16″N 77°52′58″E	Upload Photo
S-AP-53	Sri Lakshmi Narasimha Swamy temple 16th century AD	Penna Ahobilam, Uravakonda		Anantapur	14°51′37″N 77°18′26″E	Upload Photo
S-AP-54	Kodandarama swamy temple 13th century AD	Kundurpi		Anantapur	14°17′36″N 77°01′53″E	Upload Photo
S-AP-55	Narasimhaswamy temple (also spelled Narsimha swamy); 13th century AD	Kundurpi		Anantapur	14°17′43″N 77°02′03″E	Upload Photo
S-AP-56	Veerabhadraswamy temple 16th century AD	Kundurpi		Anantapur	14°17′41″N 77°02′04″E	Upload Photo
S-AP-57	Anjaneyaswamy temple 16th century AD	Kundurpi		Anantapur	14°17′41″N 77°01′56″E	Upload Photo
S-AP-58	Ballepalli Matam, Kundurpi Fort; 16th century AD	Kundurpi		Anantapur		Upload Photo
S-AP-59	Laxmi Chennakesava Swamy temple (also spelled Lakshmichennakesava); 16th century AD	Yadiki		Anantapur	15°03′01″N 77°52′24″E	Upload Photo
S-AP-60	Anjaneya Swamy temple 16th century AD	Budagavi, Uravakonda		Anantapur	14°57′51″N 77°14′12″E	Upload Photo
S-AP-61	Jaina Matha 6th century AD	Ratnagiri, Rolla		Sri Satya Sai	13°48′45″N 77°07′46″E	Upload Photo
S-AP-62	Sri Kodanda Ramaswamy temple 16th century AD	Singanamala		Anantapur		Upload Photo
S-AP-63	Ash Mounds	Budidagaddapalli, Gorantla		Anantapur		Upload Photo
S-AP-64	Malaobula Narsimha Swamy temple (also spelled as: Malle Obula Narsimhaswamy temple)	Pampanuru, Atmakuru		Anantapur	14°40′17″N 77°25′01″E	Upload Photo
S-AP-65	Mallappakonda site	Hulikallu, Kalyandurg		Anantapur	14°37′13″N 77°04′57″E	Upload Photo
S-AP-66	Patigadda site	Sasanikota, Paragi		Anantapur		Upload Photo
S-AP-67	Megalithic cist burials	Mudigal, Kalyandurg		Anantapur		Upload Photo
S-AP-68	Ancient samadhi of Great Poet Yogi Vemana; 18th century A.D.	Katarupalli, Gandlapenta		Anantapur	14°06′52″N 78°14′56″E	Upload Photo
S-AP-69	Gangarajula kota (Gootibayalu) (Built by Sri Gangaraju Palegar of Vijayanagara)	Thimammamarrimanu, Nambulapulakunta		Sri Satya sai		Upload Photo
S-AP-70	Kalyana Venkateswara Swamy temple 13th -15th CAD	Narayanavanam		Tirupati	13°25′29″N 79°35′20″E	Kalyana Venkateswara Swamy temple 13th -15th CAD
S-AP-71	Kodandaramaswamy temple (Adityeswara temple); 12th Century A.D.	Bokkasampalem, Srikalahasti		Tirupati		Upload Photo
S-AP-72	Perumallaswamy temple (Prasanna Venkateswara Swamy temple)	Thondamanadu		Tirupati	13°42′16″N 79°39′20″E	Perumallaswamy temple (Prasanna Venkateswara Swamy temple)
S-AP-73	Kasivisweswara Swamy Temple, Kalabhairava, Prayaga Madhava Swamy Temple	Damarapakam, Nagari		Chittoor	13°19′08″N 79°37′34″E	Upload Photo
S-AP-74	Kangundhi Fort, Kalikamba temple, Venugopalaswamy temple, Carved image of Hanuman, Virupakshaswamy temple			Chittoor	12°46′02″N 78°25′57″E	Upload Photo
S-AP-75	Neelakanteswara Swamy temple 11th century AD	Laddigam, Chowdepalli		Chittoor	13°23′24″N 78°39′04″E	Upload Photo
S-AP-76	(a) Swayambhu Vinayaka Swamy temple (b)Varadarajaswamy temple (c) Manikanteswara swamy temple	Kanipakam		Chittoor	13°16′37″N 79°02′03″E	(a) Swayambhu Vinayaka Swamy temple (b)Varadarajaswamy temple (c) Manikanteswara swamy temple
S-AP-77	Valleswaraswamy temple 16th century AD	Ramagiri, Pitchatur		Chittoor	13°24′18″N 79°45′55″E	Upload Photo
S-AP-78	Valmikeswara Swamy temple 16th century AD	Surutupalli, Nagalapuram		Chittoor	13°20′04″N 79°52′29″E	Upload Photo
S-AP-79	Kodandeswara Swamy temple	Kattamanchi		Chittoor	13°13′37″N 79°06′34″E	Kodandeswara Swamy temple
S-AP-80	Agasteswaraswamy temple 15th century AD	Chittoor		Chittoor	13°13′08″N 79°05′36″E	Upload Photo
S-AP-81	Megalithic Burials			Chittoor		Upload Photo
S-AP-82	Late Sri K.Jiddu Krishna Murthy House (VII 160 Raghavendra Rao Street)	Madanapalli		Annamayya		Upload Photo
S-AP-83	Sri Venugopalaswamy temple	Vizalapuram		Chittoor	12°50′03″N 78°27′47″E	Upload Photo
S-AP-84	Nawab’s Tower at the Jail	Fort Kadapa		Kadapa	14°28′44″N 78°49′16″E	Upload Photo
S-AP-85	Bhogamdanibhavi	Siddavatam		Kadapa		Upload Photo
S-AP-86	Syed Ahmed Sahib’s Tomb; 1716 A.D.	Ammen peer Dargha, Kadapa		Kadapa	14°29′06″N 78°49′28″E	Syed Ahmed Sahib’s Tomb 1716 A.D.
S-AP-87	Sri Lakshmi Narasimha Swamy Temple	Pennapenurkona, Vontimitta		Kadapa	14°26′01″N 79°03′16″E	Upload Photo
S-AP-88	Yerraguntalakota	Obulavaripalle		Annamayya		Upload Photo
S-AP-89	Narasimhaswamy temple	Jallavendlapalli (Devagudipalli) near Chinna Mandem		Annamayya	13°58′06″N 78°41′21″E	Upload Photo
S-AP-90	Siva Temple (Mabbudwalam)	Valluru		Kadapa	14°34′26″N 78°43′27″E	Upload Photo
S-AP-91	Mulasthaneswara Temple	Pothapi, Nandalur		Annamayya	14°20′56″N 79°13′44″E	Upload Photo
S-AP-92	LK Gutta site (Early Historic Buddhist Site); 2nd Century A.D.			Annamayya	14°15′51″N 79°07′54″E	Upload Photo
S-AP-93	Patigadda (Ancient Mound – Early Historic site)	Tallpaka		Annamayya		Upload Photo
S-AP-94	Kona Malleswara Swamy temple	Parnapalli		Kadapa	14°33′01″N 77°58′47″E	Upload Photo
S-AP-95	Mallikarjunaswamy temple	Upparapalli, Chennuru		Kadapa		Upload Photo
S-AP-96	Old Mosque (Royal Mosque)	Rajahmundry city		East Godavari	17°00′02″N 81°46′16″E	Upload Photo
S-AP-97	Pandavula Metta	Rampa Yerrapalam, Gokavaram		East Godavari	17°13′34″N 81°52′40″E	Upload Photo
S-AP-98	Sri Mandavya Narayana Swamy temple	Samalkot		Kakinada	17°02′32″N 82°10′02″E	Sri Mandavya Narayana Swamy temple
S-AP-99	Kunti Madhavaswamy temple, Kukkuteswara swamy temple	Pithapuram		Kakinada	17°06′34″N 82°15′02″E	Kunti Madhavaswamy temple, Kukkuteswara swamy temple
S-AP-100	Sri Bhavanarayana swamy temple	Sarpavaram		Kakinada	17°00′04″N 82°13′06″E	Sri Bhavanarayana swamy temple
S-AP-101	Sri Umakoppulinges-wara Swamy temple	Palivela		Konaseema	16°42′08″N 81°53′24″E	Sri Umakoppulinges-wara Swamy temple
S-AP-102	Ranganathaswamy temple	Korukonda		East Godavari	17°10′15″N 81°49′22″E	Upload Photo
S-AP-103-a	a: Sri Lakshminarasimha swamy temple on the top of hill. Near Sri Lakshmi-narasimhaswamy temple at the foot of hill and Sri Pushpa Badraswamy temple on the top of hill 10th Century A.D.	Korukonda		East Godavari	17°10′17″N 81°49′17″E	Upload Photo
S-AP-103-b	b: Sri Lakshmi-narasimhaswamy temple at the foot of hill. Nearby Sri Lakshminarasimha swamy temple on the top of hill and Sri Pushpa Badraswamy temple on the top of hill	Korukonda		East Godavari		Upload Photo
S-AP-103-c	c: Sri Pushpa Badraswamy temple on the top of hill. Nearby Sri Lakshminarasimha swamy temple on the top of hill and Sri Lakshmi-narasimhaswamy temple at the foot of hill.	Korukonda		East Godavari		Upload Photo
S-AP-104	Kapoteswaraswamy temple 15th Century A.D.	Kadali		Konaseema	16°27′56″N 81°53′31″E	Upload Photo
S-AP-105	Dutch tombs	Daksharamam		East Godavari		Upload Photo
S-AP-106	Ancient sites (Chandrika Theater)	Rajahmundry		East Godavari		Upload Photo
S-AP-107	Cemetery (Sir Aurthoer Cotton's son)			East Godavari		Upload Photo
S-AP-108	Sri Venugopala Swamy temple	Namagiri Narendrapattanam		Kakinada	17°22′55″N 82°27′43″E	Upload Photo
S-AP-109	Residence of Late Sri Kandukuri Veerasalingam Pantulu	Town hall road, Rajahmundry		East Godavari	17°00′05″N 81°46′20″E	Upload Photo
S-AP-110	Prehistoric stone at the Fort of the hill	Kolankonda		Guntur		Upload Photo
S-AP-111	Rock cut cave on the hill towards river	Sitanagaram		Guntur	16°30′02″N 80°36′20″E	Upload Photo
S-AP-112	Megalithic site			Guntur		Upload Photo
S-AP-113	Gopinadhaswamy temple and inscribed pillar	Kattulabavi, Kondaveedu		Guntur	16°15′11″N 80°15′08″E	Upload Photo
S-AP-114	Fort			Guntur		Upload Photo
S-AP-115	Hill Fort Kondaveedu Fort	Kondaveedu		Guntur	16°15′16″N 80°15′50″E	Hill Fort Kondaveedu Fort
S-AP-116	Bellamkonda Fort			Guntur		Upload Photo
S-AP-117	Sri Veerabhadra Swamy Temple	Phirangipuram		Guntur		Upload Photo
S-AP-118	Archaeological Site (Early Historic)	Mallepadu, Tenali		Guntur	16°13′27″N 80°38′17″E	Upload Photo
S-AP-119	Nageswaraswamy temple 12th Century A.D	Chebrolu		Guntur	16°11′41″N 80°31′37″E	Nageswaraswamy temple 12th Century A.D
S-AP-120	Veerabhadraswamy temple 11th Century A.D	Chebrolu		Guntur	16°11′46″N 80°31′40″E	Veerabhadraswamy temple 11th Century A.D
S-AP-121	Anjaneyaswamy temple	Chebrolu		Guntur	16°11′41″N 80°31′40″E	Upload Photo
S-AP-122	Bheemeswaraswamy temple 11th Century A.D	Chebrolu		Guntur	16°11′42″N 80°31′37″E	Upload Photo
S-AP-123	Adi Kesavaswamy temple 11th Century A.D	Chebrolu		Guntur	16°11′41″N 80°31′39″E	Adi Kesavaswamy temple 11th Century A.D
S-AP-124	Parvathi Ammavari temple	Chebrolu		Guntur		Upload Photo
S-AP-125	Narasimha temple	Vinukonda		Guntur	16°02′59″N 79°44′02″E	Narasimha temple
S-AP-126	Chathurmukha Brahma temple 13th Century A.D	Chebrolu		Guntur	16°11′46″N 80°31′37″E	Chathurmukha Brahma temple 13th Century A.D
S-AP-127	Ruined Fort	Chandole		Bapatla		Upload Photo
S-AP-128	Sri Lingodbava-swamivari temple 11th Century A.D.	Chandole		Bapatla	16°00′27″N 80°36′47″E	Upload Photo
S-AP-129	Chennakesava Swamyvari temple 11th Century A.D.	Chandole		Bapatla	16°00′26″N 80°36′48″E	Upload Photo
S-AP-130	Gramadevatha (Bandlamma)	Chandole		Bapatla	16°00′25″N 80°36′31″E	Upload Photo
S-AP-131	Siva temple (now in Prakasam Dist)			Guntur		Upload Photo
S-AP-132	Archaeological sites			Guntur		Upload Photo
S-AP-133	Archaeological sites	Garikapadu, Krosuru		Palnadu	16°30′28″N 80°04′31″E	Upload Photo
S-AP-134	Veerabhadraswamy temple	Macherla		Palnadu	16°28′38″N 79°25′55″E	Upload Photo
S-AP-135	Fort walls			Guntur		Upload Photo
S-AP-136	Gantala Ramalingeswara temple	Tangeda, Dachepalli		Palnadu	16°40′13″N 79°48′59″E	Upload Photo
S-AP-137	Sri Venugopalaswamy temple	Tangeda, Dachepalli		Palnadu	16°40′14″N 79°49′02″E	Upload Photo
S-AP-138	Sivunigudi			Guntur		Upload Photo
S-AP-139	Sri Kaleswaraswamy temple	Madugula, Gurazala		Palnadu	16°29′57″N 79°34′16″E	Upload Photo
S-AP-140	Janardhanaswamy temple			Guntur		Upload Photo
S-AP-141	Sri Muktheswara swamy temple	Kollipara		Guntur	16°17′08″N 80°44′56″E	Upload Photo
S-AP-231	Mud Fort	Kanukollu, Mandavalli		Eluru		Upload Photo
S-AP-232	Hill Fort and Ruined Palace	Kondapalli		NTR	16°37′30″N 80°31′51″E	Upload Photo
S-AP-233	Nuzvid Fort Gate North and South situated in Sy.No.463	Nuzvid		Eluru	16°47′27″N 80°50′59″E	Nuzvid Fort Gate North and South situated in Sy.No.463
S-AP-234	Archaeological site	Kolleti kota		Eluru	16°37′37″N 81°17′29″E	Upload Photo
S-AP-235	Rama’s temple 10th Century AD	Peddatumbalam, Adoni		Kurnool	15°45′51″N 77°15′38″E	Upload Photo
S-AP-236	Ruins of Kalkantarayan Temple; 12th Century AD	Peddatumbalam, Adoni		Kurnool	15°45′58″N 77°16′09″E	Upload Photo
S-AP-237	Ruins of Gopala Raja’s Palace			Kurnool		Upload Photo
S-AP-238	Shamma Kautun Masahilia Buruz			Kurnool		Upload Photo
S-AP-239	Mahanandiswara swamy temple in Sy.No.227			Nandyal	15°28′16″N 78°37′40″E	Mahanandiswara swamy temple in Sy.No.227 More images
S-AP-240	Sri Lakshminarasimhaswamy temple and Mandapa in Sy.No.210	Diguva Ahobilam		Nandyal	15°08′02″N 78°40′22″E	Upload Photo
S-AP-241	Sri Narasimhaswami temple in RF	Eguva Ahobilam		Nandyal	15°07′28″N 78°44′13″E	Sri Narasimhaswami temple in RF
S-AP-242	Sri Rameswaraswamy temple also known as Rama-lingeswara Swamy temple			Kurnool		Upload Photo
S-AP-243	Panikeswaraswamy temple	Panyam		Nandyal	15°31′35″N 78°20′52″E	Upload Photo
S-AP-244	Sri Pandurangaswamy temple	Chintakuntla, Koilakuntla		Nandyal		Upload Photo
S-AP-245	Sri Siva Nandiswara Swamy temple	Kadamalakalva, Bandi Atmakur		Nandyal	15°31′42″N 78°35′02″E	Upload Photo
S-AP-246	Siva temple (locally known as Nagulagudi)			Kurnool		Upload Photo
S-AP-247	Sri Panchalingeswara Swamy temple (also known as Eswara swamy temple)			Kurnool		Upload Photo
S-AP-248	Bhatalamma temple			Kurnool		Upload Photo
S-AP-249	Megalithic Burials at Alluru			Kurnool		Upload Photo
S-AP-250	1.Ancient Bastion 2.Chennakeswavaswamy temple 3.Basaveswaraswamy temple 4.Chennasomeswara swamy temple			Kurnool		Upload Photo
S-AP-251	Prehistoric rock paintings			Kurnool		Prehistoric rock paintings
S-AP-252	Sri Laxmi Narasimha Swamy temple			Kurnool		Upload Photo
S-AP-253	Sri Rajarajeswari temple			Kurnool		Upload Photo
S-AP-254	Sri Siddeswara Temple including mural paintings			Kurnool		Upload Photo
S-AP-255	Belum Caves			Kurnool		Belum Caves More images
S-AP-256	Sri Mahadevaswamy temple (Gopal Dass Bavajmutt)			Kurnool		Upload Photo
S-AP-257	Sri Suryanarayana Swamy temple			Kurnool		Upload Photo
S-AP-397	Erugulamma temple			Nellore		Upload Photo
S-AP-398	Cave			Nellore		Upload Photo
S-AP-399	Siva temple			Nellore		Upload Photo
S-AP-400	Sri Perumal Swamy temple			Nellore		Upload Photo
S-AP-401	Sri Siddeswara Swamy temple			Nellore		Upload Photo
S-AP-402	Sri Achyuta Swamy temple (Endowments Dept)			Nellore		Upload Photo
S-AP-403	Megalithic burials complex			Nellore		Upload Photo
S-AP-404	Ancient Fort at Kotamitta			Nellore		Upload Photo
S-AP-424	Buddhist site at Singarayakonda (Chandavaram)	Chandavaram		Prakasam	15°56′01″N 79°25′41″E	Buddhist site at Singarayakonda (Chandavaram)
S-AP-425	Ancient Buddhist site			Prakasam		Upload Photo
S-AP-426	Sri Mahadeswaraswamy temple also known as Siva temple	Chandavaram		Prakasam	15°54′07″N 79°25′50″E	Upload Photo
S-AP-427	Chennakeswaraswamy temple	Konidena		Bapatla	16°00′46″N 80°03′32″E	Upload Photo
S-AP-428	Sankaraswamy temple	Konidena		Bapatla	16°00′51″N 80°03′27″E	Upload Photo
S-AP-429	Venugopalaswamy temple	Konidena		Bapatla	16°00′52″N 80°03′29″E	Upload Photo
S-AP-430	Chennakesavaswamy temple	Venkatadripalem, Yerragondapalem		Prakasam	16°03′05″N 79°13′04″E	Upload Photo
S-AP-431	Sri Rameshvaraswamy temple	Racherla		Prakasam		Upload Photo
S-AP-432	Sri Anjaneya temple	Daddavada		Prakasam		Upload Photo
S-AP-433	Ancient fort of Gajapathis	Kotcherlakota		Prakasam	15°50′12″N 79°20′40″E	Upload Photo
S-AP-434	Sri Malayadri Lakshmi Narasimha Swamy varee temple	Malakonda, Voletivari Palem		SPSR Nellore	15°06′40″N 79°38′21″E	Upload Photo
S-AP-435	Sri Venugopalaswamy temple	Millampalli		Prakasam		Upload Photo
S-AP-436	Sri Madhavaswamy temple	Turimella		Prakasam		Upload Photo
S-AP-437	Siva temple	Lavanapuri (Upputuru)		Prakasam		Upload Photo
S-AP-438	Megalithic Burials			Prakasam		Upload Photo
S-AP-439	-do-			Prakasam		Upload Photo
S-AP-440	-do-			Prakasam		-do-
S-AP-441	Stupa Mound			Prakasam		Upload Photo
S-AP-442	Megalithic site			Prakasam		Upload Photo
S-AP-443	Transfer of land (Poramboku)			Prakasam		Upload Photo
S-AP-448	Telugu inscription			Srikakulam		Upload Photo
S-AP-449	Jumma Masjid			Srikakulam		Upload Photo
S-AP-450	Sri Suryanarayana Swamy temple	Arasavalli		Srikakulam	18°10′17″N 83°32′40″E	Sri Suryanarayana Swamy temple
S-AP-451	Sri Kurmananda swamy temple	Sri Kurmam		Srikakulam	18°09′43″N 84°00′09″E	Sri Kurmananda swamy temple
S-AP-452	Ancient Dutch building	Srikakulam		Srikakulam	18°16′19″N 83°54′10″E	Upload Photo
S-AP-453	Radha Govinda Swamy temple	Meliyaputti		Srikakulam	18°46′24″N 84°10′24″E	Upload Photo
S-AP-454	Jaina Caves on Sangamayyakonda Alias Goppakonda	Amudalavalasa		Srikakulam	18°26′12″N 83°54′02″E	Upload Photo
S-AP-455	Varaha Lakshmi Narasimha temple (Simhachalam)			Visakhapatnam		Varaha Lakshmi Narasimha temple (Simhachalam)
S-AP-456	Group of temples called- (i) Dharmalingeswara (ii) Radha Madhava Swamy (iii) Visweswara Swamy varu			Visakhapatnam		Group of temples called- (i) Dharmalingeswara (ii) Radha Madhava Swamy (iii) Visweswara Swamy varu
S-AP-457	Ancient images of Nilakanteswara, Mahishasura Mardhini, and Nandi situated in Sri Nilakanteswara temple			Visakhapatnam		Upload Photo
S-AP-458	Parvati temple			Visakhapatnam		Upload Photo
S-AP-459	Vigneswara temple			Visakhapatnam		Vigneswara temple
S-AP-460	Ancient site Thotlakonda (Buddhist complex)	Mangamaripeta		Visakhapatnam	17°29′39″N 83°14′36″E	Ancient site Thotlakonda (Buddhist complex) More images
S-AP-461	Buddhist complex at Bavikonda	Visakhapatnam		Visakhapatnam	17°29′25″N 83°13′58″E	Buddhist complex at Bavikonda More images
S-AP-462	Someswaraswamy temple			Visakhapatnam		Someswaraswamy temple
S-AP-463	War Memorial monument	Bobbili		Vizianagaram	18°34′42″N 83°22′12″E	Upload Photo
S-AP-464	Memorial monument			Vizianagaram		Upload Photo
S-AP-465	Sri Neelakanteswara temple 13th Century A.D	Narayanapuram, Balijipeta		Vizianagaram	18°38′09″N 83°32′28″E	Upload Photo
S-AP-495	Ksheera Ramalingeswara Swamy temple	Palakollu		West Godavari	16°32′00″N 81°44′00″E	Ksheera Ramalingeswara Swamy temple
S-AP-496	Sri Nageswaraswamy temple	Penugonda		West Godavari	16°38′59″N 81°44′29″E	Upload Photo
S-AP-497	Dutch cemetery	Palakollu		West Godavari		Upload Photo
S-AP-498	Sri Suvarneswara temple also known as Sivaganapati temple in S.No.244/1	Ganapavaram		West Godavari	17°12′06″N 81°15′44″E	Upload Photo
S-AP-499	Someswaraswamy temple	Bhimavaram		West Godavari	16°32′38″N 81°31′51″E	Someswaraswamy temple
S-AP-500	Jaina image 10th Century A.D	Penumanchili, Narsapur		West Godavari	16°35′13″N 81°49′23″E	Jaina image 10th Century A.D

== See also ==
- List of Monuments of National Importance in Andhra Pradesh
- List of State Protected Monuments in Telangana (a state formed in 2014)
- State Protected Monuments of India
