= History of Ballari =

Ballari pronounced ([ˈbəɭɭaːri]) is a historic city in Bellary district in Karnataka state, India.

== Historical names of the Ballari area ==
- Kuntala Desha

Ballari was once part of an area also known as Kuntala Desha (ಕುಂತಲ ದೇಶ) or Kuntala Vishaya (ಕುಂತಲ ವಿಷಯ) (Vishaya – a territorial division or district of a kingdom). Many inscriptions refer to the Western Chalukyas as rulers of Kuntala or Kondala.

Core area of Western Chalukya monuments, roughly corresponding to Sindavadi-1000 (ಸಿಂದವಾಡಿ-1000)

- Sindavadi

An inscription during the Gangas of Talakadu speaks of a certain Sindha Vishaya (ಸಿಂಧ ವಿಷಯ), which consists parts or whole of today's Ballari, Haveri, Gadag, Dharawada, Koppala and Bagalakote districts. Many inscriptions by Yadavas and Kalyani Chalukyas refer to this areas as Sindavadi (ಸಿಂದವಾಡಿ) or Sindavadi-nadu (ಸಿಂದವಾಡಿ-ನಾಡು) (Sindavadi-1000).

- Nolambavadi

During the rule of Western Chalukyas, the area around Bellary was part of Nolambavadi (ನೊಳಂಬವಾಡಿ) (referred to as Nolambavadi-32000), which included parts of the present Shivamogga, Chitradurga, Davanagere, Ballari and Anantapuram Districts. Further, some inscriptions mention that Nolambavadi-nadu (ನೊಳಂಬವಾಡಿ-ನಾಡು) was a part of Kuntala desha

== Timeline ==
- Neolithic Age

Numerous Neolithic archeological sites have been discovered around Bellary, some of the closest to the city being the ash mounds at Sanganakallu, Budhihal, Kudithini, Tekkalakote, Hiregudda and Kupgal in Bellary District, Maski in Raichur district and Palvoy & Velpumudugu in Ananthapuram district. These ash mounds were formed by the accumulation and burning of dung in rituals performed by Neolithic pastoralists.
The Sanganakallu settlement, spread over an area of 1,000 acres (4.0 km^{2}), is one of the largest Neolithic complexes known around Bellary. Some of the Neolithic artefacts found here have been :
- Houses of mud and stone, querns, stone axes, incised and painted pottery.
- Rock art as evidence of rituals and social ceremonies involving ringing rocks, still preserved in the form of hand-percussion marks.
- Grinding grooves where stone axes were polished
- Shallow concave surfaces on boulders where grain was processed
- Dolerite dykes quarried to manufacture stone tools on an industrical scale.

- 300 BCE – 1336 AD

Bellary was ruled in succession by the Mauryas, Satavahanas, the Pallavas, the Kadambas, the Badami Chalukyas, the Rashtrakutas, the Kalyani Chalukyas, the Southern Kalachuryas, the Sevuna Yadavas, and the Hoysalas.
The Bellary area was also ruled briefly by the Cholas during the wars between Kalyani Chalukyas and the Cholas (often involving Vengi Chalukyas), the region constantly changing hands under turmoil.
A dynasty called Ballariya Naredu ruled Bellary under the Hoysalas.

- 9th century AD and 1000–1250 AD

A branch of the Pallava family called the Nolamba-Pallavas ruled Nolambavadi-32000. Later in the 11th century AD, they ruled parts of Nolambavadi under Western Chalukyas and Hoysalas.

- 1100–1188 AD

Feudatories of Kalyani Chalukyas, Kalachuryas and Hoysalas, calling themselves Pandyas (Nolambavadi Pandyas), ruled parts of Nolambavadi-32000. They were actively involved in the conflicts amongst their overlords.

- 1336–1565 AD

After the Sevuna Yadavas and the Hoysalas (and the Kakatiyas of Warangal & the Pandyas of Madurai) were defeated by the Islamic sultanates from Delhi under Allauddin Khilji, Malik Kafur and Muhammad bin Tughlaq, the Vijayanagara Empire arose under Harihara I and Bukka I. The Bellary area was dominated by the Vijayanagara rulers until 1565 AD.
Bellary itself was ruled by the family of Hande Hanumappa Nayaka, a Palayagara (ಪಾಳೆಯಗಾರ – vassal) of the Vijayanagara rulers.

- 1565 AD

The dominance of the Vijayanagara empire ended with the Battle of Talikota, where they were defeated by a conglomerate of Deccan sultanates. After the fall of Vijayanagara, the Hande Nayakas of Bellary were subsidiary to the Adilshahi Sultanate of Bijapur.

- 1678 AD

Bellary was subsidiary to the Marathas under Shivaji. The story goes that as Shivaji was passing that way some of his foragers had been killed by the garrison, prompting him to occupy Bellary; but he restored it again to the Hande Nayakas at once on condition that tribute should be paid to him.

- 1685 AD

Bellary fell to the Mughal Emperor Aurangzeb's campaign in the Deccan).

- 1724 AD

Asaf Jah I, who was the Subedar of Gujarat and Malwa, defeated and killed the Delhi sponsored Mobariz Khan, the Subedar of the Deccan, at the battle fought at Shakar Kheda in the district of Berar.
Soon after, Asaf Jah I assumed independence from Mughal control to establish Hyderabad as a separate state, beginning the Asaf Jahi dynasty. Asif Jah I assumed the title Nizam-ul-mulk, and Bellary was included in the Nizam's Dominion.

- 1761 AD

Bellary became tributary to Basalat Jang, the brother of the then Nizam Salabat Jang and the Subedar of Aadavaani (Adoni) and Raichur.

- 1769 AD

The Hande Nayaka of Bellary refused to pay tribute to Basalat Jang, which prompted him to occupy Bellary. The Nayaka then pleaded for Hyder Ali of Mysuru (Mysore) to rescue Bellary. Hyder Ali forcefully expelled the occupiers, after which the Hande Nayakas were tributary to him.

- 1792 AD

At the partition of Tipu Sultan's territory by the British after the Third Anglo-Mysore War, the district was given to the then Nizam Asaf Jah II.

- 1800 AD

After the defeat and death of Tipu Sultan in the Fourth Anglo-Mysore War at Srirangapattanam (Seringapatam), the Mysore territories were further divided up between the Wodeyars, Asaf Jah II and the British.
In 1796 AD, Asaf Jah II, harassed by the Marathas and Tipu Sultan, had opted to get British military protection under Lord Wellesley's doctrine of Subsidiary Alliance. As part of this agreement, Asif Jah II ceded a large portion of the acquired territory including Bellary, to the British, with the consent of the Hande Nayakas to be added to the Madras Presidency as 'Bellary District'. This area was also known as the Ceded Districts, a term still used for the areas, and was considerably larger than the present district, including the present districts of Kadapa (Cuddapah), Anantapuram and much of Karnoolu (Kurnool).

- 1800–1807 AD

All through these political changes since Vijayanagar times, the Hande Nayakas were the de facto rulers of Bellary – while their masters constantly changed, locally their powers were absolute. All this changed with the arrival of Major Thomas Munro, the first collector of the Ceded Districts (1800–1807), who disposed of the eighty palayagars (Polygars) of the districts either with pensions or assimilation of their estates and established the Ryotwari system – land revenue collected directly from the tiller of the soil.

- 1808 AD

The ceded districts area was split into two districts, Bellary and Kadapa. The Bellary area was still larger than Kadapa and the second largest district in Madras Presidency, measuring 13000 square miles (nearly twice the size of Wales), and a population of 1,250,000 (one and half times that of Wales).

- 1840 AD

Bellary became the headquarters of the district. The Collector until this year lived in Anantapuram.

- 1867 AD

The Bellary Municipal Council was created, along with the Adoni Municipal Council. These were the only two municipal townships in the whole of Bellary district for a long time.

- 1882 AD

Seven of the southern talukas were carved out to form Anantapuram district, further reducing the size of Bellary District.
The Maratha princely state of Sandur was surrounded by Bellary district.

- 1894 AD

A steam cotton-spinning mill was established.

- 1901 AD

Bellary was the seventh largest town in Madras Presidency, and was one of the chief military stations in Southern India, garrisoned by British and native Indian troops under the British Indian Government. A company of the Southern Mahratta Railway Volunteer Rifles was also stationed in the town.
The town included a civil railway station to the east of the Bellary Fort, the cantonment and its railway station on the west, the Cowl Bazar and the suburbs of 'Bruce-pettah' (currently spelt Brucepet) and 'Mellor-pettah', named after two British officers once stationed in the town.
The town was also headquarters for the Roman Catholic Mission and the London Mission.
The industries in the town included a small distillery and two steam cotton-presses. The steam cotton-spinning mill established in 1894 had 17,800 spindles, and employed 520 hands.

- 1 October 1953 AD
  A 1951 map showing Bellary district in Madras State

Bellary district of Madras State was divided on linguistic basis.
Areas with significant Kannada speaking populations (Harapanahalli, Hadagali, Kudligi, Hosapete, Sanduru and Siruguppa) were transferred to Mysore state, which would later become Karnataka state.
Areas of the district with significant Telugu speaking populations (Yemmiganuru, Aadavaani, Aaluru, Raayadurgam, D.Hirehaalu, Kanekallu, Bommanahaalu, Gummagatta) were merged into Anantapuram and Karnulu districts in what would later become Andhra Pradesh state.
Bellary city had a majority of Telugu speaking population with highest minority of Kannada speakers, But it was included into Mysore state after a protracted debate and controversy.

- 1997 AD

With the re-organisation of the districts in Karnataka, Harapanahalli taluk was transferred to Davanagere district, reducing the number of talukas in the district to seven.

- 2004 AD

Bellary City Municipal Council was upgraded to a City Corporation.

- 2018 AD

Harapanahalli taluk was again transferred back to Bellary District

- 2021 AD

Vijayanagar District was separated from Bellary District in 2021 at present Bellary District consists of only five taluks Kampli, Sandur, Siruguppa, Kurugodu and Bellary.
