= Marur =

Village in Andhra Pradesh, India

Marur is a village in Raptadu mandal, Anantapur, a district in the Rayalaseema region of Andhra Pradesh, India. It is located near National Highway 44 and includes a large toll plaza called the Maruru Toll Plaza. The village is made up of different minorities including Valmikis, Reddys, Kurubas, and Nadians.

The village is also known as a religious center with many sacred temples in and around the village. The village is known for the Sri Chinna Kadirayya Swamy temple. Every Saturday, a festival atmosphere develops near the temple as people from distant places come to worship.
