= Garladinne mandal =

- Mandal
- Interactive map of Garladinne mandal
- Location in Andhra Pradesh, India
- Coordinates: 14.8222662°N 77.5980019°E
- Country: India
- State: Andhra Pradesh
- District: Anantapur
- Headquarters: Garladinne

Area
  - Total: 270.25 km^{2} (104.34 sq mi)

Population (2011)
  - Total: 53,780
  - Density: 199.0/km^{2} (515.4/sq mi)

Languages
  - Official: Telugu
- Time zone: UTC+5:30 (IST)

Garladinne mandal is one of the 32 mandals in Anantapur district of the state of Andhra Pradesh in India. It is under the administration of Ananthapuramu revenue division and the headquarters are located at Garladinne village.

== Demographics ==
As of the 2011 Census of India, Garladinne mandal comprises 13,192 households. The total population is 53,780, with 27,299 males and 26,481 females. The child population is 5,868. Scheduled Castes constitute 10,077 of the population, while Scheduled Tribes account for 1,716 individuals. The number of literate individuals stands at 28,407. The workforce in Garladinne mandal includes 30,420 workers.

== Villages ==
List of villages/settlements in Garladinne mandal

1. Ankampeta
2. Budedu
3. Garladinne
4. Illuru
5. Jambuladinne
6. Kalluru
7. Kalluru Agraharam
8. Kanampalle
9. Kesavapuram
10. Koppalakonda
11. Kotanka
12. Krishnapuram
13. Marthadu
14. Muntimadugu
15. Obulapuram
16. Penakacherla
17. Penakacherla Kothapalli
18. Penakacherla Dam
19. Sirivaram
20. Yerraguntla
21. Sanjeevapuram
22. Mukundapuram
