= J A Chowdary =

Indian businessman, b. 1955

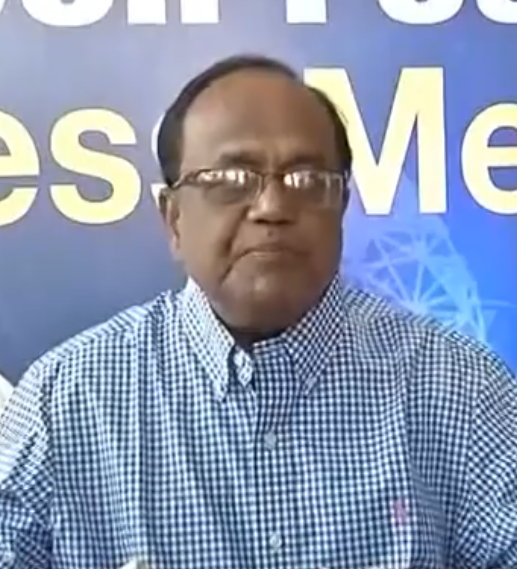
- Born: Jakkampudi Adiseshaiah Chowdary; 18 February 1955 (age 71); Bathalapalle, Andhra Pradesh
- Education: IIT Madras
- Occupations: Former IT Advisor and Special Chief Secretary to the Chief Minister, Government of Andhra Pradesh

Jakkampudi Adiseshaiah Chowdary (born 18 February 1955) is the founding director of Software Technology Parks of India (STPI) at Bangalore, Hyderabad and Chennai. He also served as chairman of the Indian BlockChain Standards Committee, the General Partner-Succeed Innovation Fund and a former IT advisor and special chief secretary to the Chief Minister, Government of Andhra Pradesh. He is "one of the key architects" of HITEC City and Cyberabad in Hyderabad.

J A Chowdary is leading the Fintech Forum in Hyderabad.

== Early life ==
J A chowdary was born in a Telugu family on 18 February 1955 in Bathalapalle, in Sri Sathya Sai district (previously Anantapur district) of Andhra Pradesh.

He started his career at the Indian Space Research Organisation as a scientist, where he was involved in designing telemetry subsystems for Bhaskara, Rohini and Aryabhata satellites.

He worked at Bharat Heavy Electricals Limited (BHEL), where he contributed towards developing mechanisms that would facilitate online monitoring of pollution levels, and process control instruments for BHEL power stations.

Chowdary has an M.Tech in solid state electronics from Indian Institute of Technology Madras and an M.Sc from SK University.

== Career and contributions ==
In the 1990s. Chowdary was credited as "one of the key architects" of the HITEC City and Cyberabad in Hyderabad and in founding International Institute of Information Technology, Hyderabad at Hyderabad and IIDT at Tirupati.

Chowdary is a co-founder of PortalPlayer which was acquired by Nvidia in 2007. He led the development of the chip that went into the first generation of iPod. He is also a co-founder and board member at Hyderabad Angels.

Chowdary has been in the roles of chairman of the Industry Development Forum for Andhra Pradesh, co-chairman of the Federation of Indian Chambers of Commerce & Industry (Telangana and Andhra Pradesh), president of the Anantapur Development Initiative Foundation and president of the Food 360 Foundation.

== Awards and honours ==
Chowdary has won:

- "Meritorious Invention Award" from NRDC, Government of India,
- HMA Award of excellence "for promoting the Indian IT Industry",
- HYSEA Award of excellence "for promoting the IT industry in Andhra Pradesh" and in 2020 HYSEA awarded him "Life Time Achievement Award" too
- Award of excellence from the Telugu Association of the state of Texas in the United States.

== See also ==
- Software Technology Parks of India (STPI)
- HITEC City
- Fintech Valley Vizag
