= Yellanur mandal =

Mandal in Andhra Pradesh, India

- Mandal
- Interactive Map Outlining mandal
- Location in Andhra Pradesh, India
- Coordinates: 14.6997°N 78.0713°E
- Country: India
- State: Andhra Pradesh
- District: Anantapur
- Headquarters: Yellanur

Area
  - Total: 296.76 km^{2} (114.58 sq mi)

Population (2011)
  - Total: 35,732
  - Density: 120.41/km^{2} (311.85/sq mi)

Languages
  - Official: Telugu
- Time zone: UTC+5:30 (IST)

Yellanur mandal is one of the 31 mandals in Anantapur district of the state of Andhra Pradesh in India. It is under the administration of Ananthapuramu revenue division and the headquarters are located at Yellanur village.

== Demographics ==
As of the 2011 Census of India, Yellanur mandal comprises 9,162 households. The total population is 35,732, with 18,203 males and 17,529 females. The child population is 3,789. Scheduled Castes constitute 5,954 of the population, while Scheduled Tribes account for 114 individuals. The number of literate individuals stands at 19,019. The workforce in Yellanur mandal includes 19,815 workers.

== Villages ==
List of villages/settlements in Yellanur mandal

1. Aravedu
2. Boppepalle (incl. Vasapuram)
3. Bukkapuram
4. Chilamakuru
5. Goddumarri
6. Kacharlakunta
7. Kalluru
8. Kodumurthy
9. Mallagundla
10. Medukurthy
11. Nitturu
12. Pathapalle
13. Peddamallepalle
14. Singavaram
15. Thirumalapuram
16. Vemulapalle
17. Vennapurapalle
18. Y.Chintakayamanda
19. Yellanur
