= Kanampalli =

Coordinates: 13°51′N 77°53′E

- Village
- Interactive map of Kanampalli
- Country: India
- State: Andhra Pradesh
- District: Anantapur
- Talukas: Garladinne

Population (2011)
  - Total: 1,818

Languages
  - Official: Telugu
- Time zone: UTC+5:30 (IST)
- PIN: 515731

Kanampalli is one of the villages in Garladinne mandal, located in Anantapur district of Andhra Pradesh, India.

== Demographics ==
As of 2011 census, Kanampalli had a population of 1,818. The total population constitutes 894 males and 924 females —a sex ratio of 939 females per 1000 males. 188 children are in the age group of 0–6 years, of which 94 are boys and 94 are girls —a ratio of 1000 per 1000. The average literacy rate stands at 50.74% with 827 literates.
