= Marthadu =

Village in Andhra Pradesh, India

Marthadu is a village in India (in Garladinne mandal, Anantapur District) located 21 kilometres from Anantapur town. Pennakacherla dam is 10 km from Garladinne, and there is a water canal that flows through Marthadu to Anantapur town. This canal provides the village with irrigation. Groundnuts (peanuts), green oranges rice paddies and oranges are some of the commercial crops grown by the villagers.

== Demographics ==
According to Indian census, 2001, the demographic details of Marthadu village is as follows:

- Total Population: 20000 in 1000 Households
- Male Population: 12000 and Female Population: 8000
- Children Under 6-years of age: 770(Boys - 427 and Girls - 343)
- Total Literates: 2500
