= Rallapalli =

Rallapalli may refer to:

- Rallipalli, a village in Kambadur mandal of Anantapur district, Andhra Pradesh, India
- Rallapalli Anantha Krishna Sharma (1893-1979), composer of Carnatic music, singer and writer
- Rallapalli (actor), Telugu film actor
