= Vadla Ramapuram =

- village
- Interactive map of Vadla Ramapuram
- Country: India
- State: Andhra Pradesh
- District: Nandyal
- Mandal: Atmakur

Languages
  - Official: Telugu
- Time zone: UTC+5:30 (IST)
- PIN: 518 422

Vadla Ramapuram is a small village in Atmakur mandal, Nandyal district of Andhra Pradesh state of India.

== Etymology ==
"Vadla" in its name derives from the fact that it is famous for paddy in that region.
