= List of tourist attractions in Anantapur district =

Anantapur is a city in the Indian state of Andhra Pradesh. It was a position of strategic importance for the British Indian Army during the Second World War. Due to this, there are many forts around the area with historical significance.

== Tourist attractions ==
Name	City / town	State	Image
Gooty Fort	Gooty	Anantapur district	Gooty fort view
Rayadurgam Fort	Rayadurgam	Anantapur district	
Veerabhadra Temple	Rayadurgam	Anantapur district	Veerabhadra Temple, Lepakshi
ISKCON Temple	Anantapuramu	Anantapur district	
Lepakshi Veerabhadra Swamy Temple	Lepakshi	Anantapur district	
Mounagiri Kshetram	National Highway 44	Anantapur district	

== See also ==
- List of state protected Monuments in Andhra Pradesh
