= K.C. Ramanna Hospital =

- Private hospital

Geography
- Location: Opp. Municipal office, Sai Nagar, Anantapur, Andhra Pradesh, India 515001

Organisation
- Care system: Obstetrics, Gynaecology, Cardiology, Pediatrics and General Surgery
- Type: General hospital

Links
- Website: http://kcramanna-hospital.business.site

K.C. Ramanna Hospital is a multi-speciality hospital in Anantapur, Andhra Pradesh, India. It provides specialist services including Obstetrics, Gynaecology, Cardiology, Pediatrics and General Surgery. Along with pharmacy and laboratory services, there are four outpatient department blocks, OPD rooms general wards and special wards.
