= Bukkaraya Samudram mandal =

- Mandal
- Interactive map of Bukkaraya Samudram mandal
- Location in Andhra Pradesh, India
- Coordinates: 14.6935°N 77.6335°E
- Country: India
- State: Andhra Pradesh
- District: Anantapur
- Headquarters: Bukkarayasamudram

Area
  - Total: 250.90 km^{2} (96.87 sq mi)

Population (2011)
  - Total: 67,384
  - Density: 268.57/km^{2} (695.59/sq mi)

Languages
  - Official: Telugu
- Time zone: UTC+5:30 (IST)

Bukkaraya Samudram mandal or B.K. Samudram mandal is one of the 32 mandals in Anantapur district of the state of Andhra Pradesh in India. It is under the administration of Ananthapuramu revenue division and the headquarters are located at Bukkarayasamudram town.

== Demographics ==
As of the 2011 Census of India, Bukkaraya Samudram mandal comprises 16,091 households. The total population is 67,384, with 34,582 males and 32,802 females. The child population is 8,141. Scheduled Castes constitute 10,929 of the population, while Scheduled Tribes account for 2,608 individuals.

The number of literate individuals stands at 35,035, highlighting a significant disparity between the literate and illiterate populations, the latter being 32,349. The workforce in Bukkaraya Samudram mandal includes 35,486 workers, while 31,898 individuals are categorized as non-workers.

== Villages ==
List of villages/settlements in Bukkaraya Samudram mandal

1. Bodiganidoddi
2. Bukkarayasamudram
3. Chedulla
4. Chennampalle
5. Chennarayunipalle
6. Danduvaripalle
7. Govindapalle
8. Janthulur
9. Kondakinda Agraharam
10. Korrapadu
11. Podaralla
12. Reddipalle
13. Siddampeta
14. Siddarampuram
