= List of rural local bodies in Andhra Pradesh =

This article lists all the rural local bodies in the Indian state of Andhra Pradesh, including Zilla Praja Parishads, Mandal Praja Parisahds. municipal corporations, municipalities and Nagar panchayats. The state comprises 13,359 Grama Panchayats, 10,047 MPTC, 660 ZPTC 123 rural local bodies across its 28 districts.

== Zilla Praja Parishads ==
Zilla Praja Parishad	Year established
Ananthapur Zilla Praja Parishad	
Chittoor Zilla Praja Parishad	
East Godavari Zilla Praja Parishad	
Guntur Zilla Praja Parishad	
Kadapa Zilla Praja Parishad	
Krishna Zilla Praja Parishad	
Kurnool Zilla Praja Parishad	
Nellore Zilla Praja Parishad	
Prakasam Zilla Praja Parishad	
Srikakulam Zilla Praja Parishad	
Visakhapatnam Zilla Praja Parishad	
Vizianagaram Zilla Praja Parishad	
West Godavari Zilla Praja Parishad	
