= Kudair mandal =

- Mandal
- Interactive map of Kudair mandal
- Location in Andhra Pradesh, India
- Coordinates: 14.7317°N 77.4248°E
- Country: India
- State: Andhra Pradesh
- District: Anantapur
- Headquarters: Kudair

Area
  - Total: 358.15 km^{2} (138.28 sq mi)

Population (2011)
  - Total: 38,312
  - Density: 106.97/km^{2} (277.06/sq mi)

Languages
  - Official: Telugu
- Time zone: UTC+5:30 (IST)

Kudair mandal is one of the 32 mandals in Anantapur district of the state of Andhra Pradesh in India. It is under the administration of Ananthapuramu revenue division and the headquarters are located at Kudair village.

== Demographics ==
As of the 2011 Census of India, Kudair mandal comprises 9,272 households. The total population is 38,312, with 19,470 males and 18,842 females. The child population is 4,404. Scheduled Castes constitute 6,994 of the population, while Scheduled Tribes account for 2,061 individuals. The number of literate individuals stands at 20,233. The workforce in Kudair mandal includes 18,079 workers.

== Villages ==
List of villages/settlements in Kudair mandal

1. Brahmanapalle
2. Cholasamudram
3. Gotukur
4. Ipperu
5. Jayapuram
6. Kalagalla
7. Kamuru
8. Korrakodu
9. Kudair
10. Marutla
11. Mavinamardhanahalli
12. Thimmapuram
13. Udiripikonda
