= Chennarayunipalle =

- Interactive map of Chennarayunipalle
- Location in Andhra Pradesh, India
- Coordinates: 14°42′36.1″N 77°40′42.5″E
- Country: India
- State: Andhra Pradesh
- District: Anantapur

Population (2011)
  - Total: 50

Languages
  - Official: Telugu
- Time zone: UTC+5:30 (IST)
- Postal code: 595072
- Vehicle registration: AP

Chennarayunipalle is a village in Anantapur district of the Indian state of Andhra Pradesh. It is located in Bukkaraya Samudram mandal.

== Geography ==
Chennarayunipalle is located at 14°42'36.1" N 77°40'42.5". E. Neelampalli is the gram panchayat of Chennarayunipalle village, the land area is 139 hectares.

== Demographics ==
According to the 2011 Indian census, there is a population of 50 with 11 households. At this time there were 19 employed persons. The village code is 595072.

== See also ==
- List of census towns in Andhra Pradesh
