= Anantapur Rural mandal =

- Mandal
- Interactive map of Anantapur Rural mandal
- Location in Andhra Pradesh, India
- Coordinates: 14.68°N 77.60°E
- Country: India
- State: Andhra Pradesh
- District: Anantapuramu
- Headquarters: Anantapuramu

Languages
  - Official: Telugu
- Time zone: UTC+5:30 (IST)
- Vehicle registration: AP

Anantapur Rural mandal is a mandal in Anantapur district of the Indian state of Andhra Pradesh. It is administered under Anantapuramu revenue division and its headquarters are located at Anantapur. It is formed on 8 May 2023 by dividing Anantapur mandal into Anantapur Urban and Anantapur Rural mandals.

== Towns and villages ==
The mandal consists of the following.

1. Alamuru
2. Chiyyedu
3. Gollapalli
4. Itikalapalli
5. Jangalapalli
6. Kakkalapalli
7. Kakkalapalli (Part i.e., Kakkalapalli Village & Kakkalapalli Colony)
8. Kamarupalli
9. Kandukur
10. Katiganigakaluva
11. Kodimi
12. Kurugunta
13. Mannila
14. Papampeta Part
15. Rachanapalli
16. Sajjalakaluva
17. Somaladoddi
18. Taticherla
19. Upparapalli

== See also ==
- List of mandals in Andhra Pradesh
