= Anantapur Urban mandal =

- Mandal
- Interactive map of Anantapur Urban mandal
- Location in Andhra Pradesh, India
- Coordinates: 14.68°N 77.60°E
- Country: India
- State: Andhra Pradesh
- District: Anantapuramu
- Headquarters: Anantapuramu

Languages
  - Official: Telugu
- Time zone: UTC+5:30 (IST)
- Vehicle registration: AP

Anantapur Urban mandal is a mandal in Anantapur district of the Indian state of Andhra Pradesh. It is administered under Anantapuramu revenue division and its headquarters are located at Anantapur. It is formed on 8 May 2023 by dividing Anantapur mandal into Anantapur Urban and Anantapur Rural mandals.

== Towns and villages ==
The mandal consists of the following.

1. Anantapur Municipal Corporation (consisting of 28- Rev. Wards With 74 Ward Sachivalayams)
2. A.Narayanapuramu
3. Anantapur Village
4. Kakkalapalli (Part i.e., Rudrampeta Grama Panchyat)
5. Papampeta-Part

== See also ==
- List of mandals in Andhra Pradesh
