= Peddapappur mandal =

- Mandal
- Interactive Map Outlining mandal
- Location in Andhra Pradesh, India
- Coordinates: 14.9289°N 77.8617°E
- Country: India
- State: Andhra Pradesh
- District: Anantapur
- Headquarters: Peddapappur

Area
  - Total: 215.19 km^{2} (83.09 sq mi)

Population (2011)
  - Total: 34,629
  - Density: 160.92/km^{2} (416.79/sq mi)

Languages
  - Official: Telugu
- Time zone: UTC+5:30 (IST)

Peddapappur mandal is one of the 32 mandals in Anantapur district of the state of Andhra Pradesh in India. It is under the administration of Ananthapuramu revenue division and the headquarters are located at Peddapappur village.

== Demographics ==
As of the 2011 Census of India, Peddapappur mandal comprises 8,604 households. The total population is 34,629, with 17,600 males and 17,029 females. The child population is 3,690. Scheduled Castes constitute 6,373 of the population, while Scheduled Tribes account for 140 individuals. The number of literate individuals stands at 18,253. The workforce in Peddapappur mandal includes 20,290 workers.

== Villages ==
List of villages/settlements in Peddapappur mandal

1. Amalladinne
2. Athiralladinne
3. Chagallu
4. Chinnayakkaluru
5. Devanuppalapadu
6. Dharmapuram
7. Garladinne
8. Jodidharmapuram
9. Jutur
10. Kummetha
11. Muchukota
12. Narasapuram
13. Pasalur
14. Peddapappur
15. Peddayakkaluru
16. Pendekallu
17. Tabjula
