= Narpala mandal =

- Mandal
- Interactive Map Outlining mandal
- Location in Andhra Pradesh, India
- Coordinates: 14.7111°N 77.8093°E
- Country: India
- State: Andhra Pradesh
- District: Anantapur
- Headquarters: Narpala

Area
  - Total: 250.96 km^{2} (96.90 sq mi)

Population (2011)
  - Total: 54,973
  - Density: 219.05/km^{2} (567.34/sq mi)

Languages
  - Official: Telugu
- Time zone: UTC+5:30 (IST)

Narpala mandal is one of the 32 mandals in Anantapur district of the state of Andhra Pradesh in India. It is under the administration of Ananthapuramu revenue division and the headquarters are located at Narpala town.

== Demographics ==
As of the 2011 Census of India, Narpala mandal comprises 14,255 households. The total population is 54,973, with 28,026 males and 26,947 females. The child population is 6,209. Scheduled Castes constitute 10,276 of the population, while Scheduled Tribes account for 1,012 individuals. The number of literate individuals stands at 27,461. The workforce in Narpala mandal includes 32,691 workers.

== Villages ==
List of villages/settlements in Narpala mandal

1. B.Pappuru
2. Bandlapalle
3. Bondalawada
4. Chamaluru
5. Duggumarri
6. Durgam
7. Gugudu
8. Haveli Sodanapalle
9. Nadimidoddi
10. Narpala
11. Siddaracherla
12. Venkatampalle
