= Peddapappur =

Coordinates: 14°53′04″N 77°51′31″E

- Village
- Interactive map of Peddapappur
- Country: India
- State: Andhra Pradesh
- District: Anantapur
- Talukas: Tadipatri

Population (2001)
  - Total: 33,556

Languages
  - Official: Telugu
- Time zone: UTC+5:30 (IST)
- Vehicle registration: AP

Peddapappur is a village in Anantapur district of the Indian state of Andhra Pradesh. It is the mandal headquarters of Peddapappur mandal in Anantapur revenue division.
