= Atmakur mandal =

Atmakur mandal may refer to:

- Atmakur mandal, Anantapur district
- Atmakur mandal, Nellore district
