= Vasapuram =

- Village
- Interactive map of Vasapuram
- Location in Andhra Pradesh, India
- Coordinates: 14.6761°N 77.9937°E
- Country: India
- State: Andhra Pradesh
- District: Anantapur

Languages
  - Official: Telugu
- Time zone: UTC+5:30 (IST)

Vasapuram is a village in Yellanur mandal, Anantapur district in the state of Andhra Pradesh in the southern part of India. It comes under Boppepalle.
