= Brahmasamudram =

- Village
- Interactive map of Brahmasamudram
- Location in Andhra Pradesh, India Brahmasamudram (India)
- Coordinates: 14°32′20″N 76°56′50″E
- Country: India
- State: Andhra Pradesh
- District: Anantapur
- Talukas: Brahmasamudram

Population
  - Total: 39,518

Languages
  - Official: Telugu
- Time zone: UTC+5:30 (IST)
- Vehicle registration: AP

Brahmasamudram is a village in Anantapur district of the Indian state of Andhra Pradesh. It is the headquarters of Brahmasamudram mandal in Kalyandurgam revenue division.

== Demographics ==
According to Indian census, 2001, the demographic details of Brahmasamudram mandal is as follows:

- Total Population: 39,518 in 7,438 Households.
- Male Population: 20,120 and Female Population: 19,398
- Children Under 6-years of age: 6,134 (Boys - 3,113 and Girls - 3,021)
- Total Literates: 15,164
