= Beluguppa =

- Village
- Interactive map of Beluguppa
- Location in Andhra Pradesh, India
- Coordinates: 14.7167°N 77.1333°E
- Country: India
- State: Andhra Pradesh
- District: Anantapur
- Talukas: Uravakonda

Population
  - Total: 40,546

Languages
  - Official: Telugu
- Time zone: UTC+5:30 (IST)
- PIN: 515741
- Telephone code: 08497

Beluguppa is a village in Anantapur district of the Indian state of Andhra Pradesh. It is the headquarters of Beluguppa mandal in Kalyandurgam revenue division.

== Geography ==
Beluguppa is located at 14.7167°N 77.1333°E. It has an average elevation of 458 metres (1501 ft).

== Demographics ==
According to Indian census, 2001, the demographic details of Beluguppa mandal is as follows:

- Total Population: 40,546 in 8,402 Households
- Male Population: 20,734 and Female Population: 19,812
- Children Under 6-years of age: 5,099 (Boys - 2,575 and Girls - 2,524)
- Total Literates: 19,447
