= Settur =

- Village
- Interactive map of Settur
- Location in Andhra Pradesh, India Settur (India)
- Coordinates: 14.4500°N 76.9833°E
- Country: India
- State: Andhra Pradesh
- District: Anantapur
- Talukas: Settur
- Elevation: 551 m (1,808 ft)

Population (2001)
  - Total: 38,281

Languages
  - Official: Telugu
- Time zone: UTC+5:30 (IST)
- Vehicle registration: AP

Settur is a village in Anantapur district of the Indian state of Andhra Pradesh. It is the headquarters of Settur mandal in Kalyandurgam revenue division.

== Geography ==
Setturu is located at 14.4500°N 76.9833°E. It has an average elevation of 551 metres (1811 ft).

== Demographics ==
According to Indian census, 2001, the demographic details of Settur mandal is as follows:

- Total Population: 38,281 in 7,564 Households.
- Male Population: 19,493 and Female Population: 18,788
- Children Under 6-years of age: 5,920 (Boys - 3,032 and Girls - 2,888)
- Total Literates: 16,538

== Panchayats ==
The following is the list of village panchayats in Settur mandal.
