= Narpala =

- Village
- Interactive map of Narpala
- Location in Andhra Pradesh, India Narpala (India)
- Coordinates: 14°42′N 77°48′E
- Country: India
- State: Andhra Pradesh
- District: Anantapur
- Talukas: Singanamala

Population (2011)
  - Total: 51,728

Languages
  - Official: Telugu
- Time zone: UTC+5:30 (IST)
- PIN: 515425
- Telephone code: +91-8554
- Vehicle registration: AP

Narpala is a village in Anantapur district of the Indian state of Andhra Pradesh. It is the mandal headquarters of Narpala mandal in Anantapur revenue division. Narpala is located 23 km from Anantapur. Famous Gugudu kullai swamy temple is in Narpala Mandal only.

Transport : From Anantapur every 15mins APSRTC palle velugu buses are available.

From DHARMAVARAM and TADIPATHRI every 30mins APSRTC palle velugu buses are available.

Crops : Mainly Ground nut, Banana, Mango and Sweet lime.
