= Singanamala mandal =

Mandal in Andhra Pradesh, India

- Mandal
- Interactive Map Outlining mandal
- Location in Andhra Pradesh, India
- Coordinates: 14.8011°N 77.7175°E
- Country: India
- State: Andhra Pradesh
- District: Anantapur
- Headquarters: Singanamala

Area
  - Total: 310.23 km^{2} (119.78 sq mi)

Population (2011)
  - Total: 43,643
  - Density: 140.68/km^{2} (364.36/sq mi)

Languages
  - Official: Telugu
- Time zone: UTC+5:30 (IST)

Singanamala mandal is one of the 31 mandals in Anantapur district of the state of Andhra Pradesh in India. It is under the administration of Ananthapuramu revenue division and the headquarters are located at Singanamala village.

== Demographics ==
As of the 2011 Census of India, Singanamala mandal comprises 10,710 households. The total population is 43,643, with 22,032 males and 21,611 females. The child population is 4,906. Scheduled Castes constitute 9,434 of the population, while Scheduled Tribes account for 2,262 individuals. The number of literate individuals stands at 22,338. The workforce in Singanamala mandal includes 24,614 workers.

== Villages ==
List of villages/settlements in Singanamala mandal

1. Akuledu
2. Anandaraopeta
3. Buddepalle
4. Chakrayapeta
5. Cheelapalle
6. Chennavaram
7. Joolakalva
8. Kallumadi
9. Karnatakampalle
10. Korivipalle
11. Lolur
12. Matlagondi
13. Narsapuram
14. Nidhanawada
15. Peddajalalpuram
16. Peravali
17. Rachepalle
18. Salakamcheruvu
19. Singanamala
20. Sodanapalle
21. Tarimela
22. Ullikallu
