= Putlur mandal =

Mandal in Andhra Pradesh, India

- Mandal
- Interactive Map Outlining mandal
- Location in Andhra Pradesh, India
- Coordinates: 14.8123°N 77.9659°E
- Country: India
- State: Andhra Pradesh
- District: Anantapur
- Headquarters: Putlur

Area
  - Total: 319.19 km^{2} (123.24 sq mi)

Population (2011)
  - Total: 34,629
  - Density: 108.49/km^{2} (280.99/sq mi)

Languages
  - Official: Telugu
- Time zone: UTC+5:30 (IST)

Putlur mandal is one of the 31 mandals in Anantapur district of the state of Andhra Pradesh in India. It is under the administration of Ananthapuramu revenue division and the headquarters are located at Putlur village.

== Demographics ==
As of the 2011 Census of India, Putlur mandal comprises 9,014 households. The total population is 36,902, with 18,699 males and 18,203 females. The child population is 3,789. Scheduled Castes constitute 6,786 of the population, while Scheduled Tribes account for 29 individuals. The number of literate individuals stands at 19,728. The workforce in Putlur mandal includes 19,728 workers.

== Villages ==
List of villages/settlements in Putlur mandal

1. Arakativemula
2. Chalavemula
3. Cherlopalli
4. Chinnamallepalle
5. Chintakunta
6. Chintalapalle
7. Dosaledu
8. Ellutla
9. Gandlapadu
10. Kadavakallu
11. Kandikapula
12. Komatikuntla
13. Kummanamala
14. Madugupalle
15. Putlur
16. Sanagalaguduru
17. Surepalli
18. Rangamanayuni Palle
