= Papampeta =

- Census Town
- Location in Andhra Pradesh, India
- Coordinates: 14°10′5″N 77°48′36″E
- Country: India
- State: Andhra Pradesh
- District: Anantapur

Area
  - Total: 3.78 km^{2} (1.46 sq mi)

Population (2011)
  - Total: 13,850
  - Density: 3,660/km^{2} (9,490/sq mi)

Languages
  - Official: Telugu
- Time zone: UTC+5:30 (IST)
- Vehicle registration: AP

Papampeta is a census town in Anantapur district of the Indian state of Andhra Pradesh. It is located in Anantapur mandal of Anantapur revenue division. The town is a constituent of Anantapur urban agglomeration.

== Demographics ==
As of 2001 India census, Papampeta had a population of 9,308. Males constitute 53% of the population and females 47%. Papampeta has an average literacy rate of 60%, higher than the national average of 59.5%: male literacy is 68%, and female literacy is 50%. In Papampeta, 12% of the population is under 6 years of age.

== Transport ==
State run APS RTC buses from Anantapur to this town. Anantapur is the nearest railway station.

== Education ==
The primary and secondary school education is imparted by government, aided and private schools, under the School Education Department of the state. The medium of instruction followed by different schools are English, Telugu.

== See also ==
- List of census towns in Andhra Pradesh
