= Yellanur =

- village
- Interactive map of Yellanur
- Location in Andhra Pradesh, India Yellanur (India)
- Coordinates: 14.70°N 78.08°E
- Country: India
- State: Andhra Pradesh
- District: Anantapur
- Talukas: Yellanur

Languages
  - Official: Telugu
- Time zone: UTC+5:30 (IST)
- Telephone code: 08550

Yellanur is a village in Anantapur district of the Indian state of Andhra Pradesh. It is the mandal headquarters of Yellanur mandal in Anantapur revenue division. It is located 75.4 km distance from its district main city Anantapur and 420 km distance from state's capital Amaravati.

== Geography ==
Chitravathi river flows across the village. The soil is black. The main crops are oranges, paddy, ground nut, cotton, red gram, chickpea, sunflower seeds, and jowar.
