= Havaligi =

- village
- Interactive map of Havaligi
- Location in Andhra Pradesh, India Havaligi (India)
- Coordinates: 15°01′N 77°07′E
- Country: India
- State: Andhra Pradesh
- District: Anantapur

Languages
  - Official: Telugu
- Time zone: UTC+5:30 (IST)
- PIN: 08496
- Nearest city: uravakonda & Bellary (Karnataka)

Havaligi is a little village in Andhra Pradesh. It lies on the border between Andhara Pradesh and Karnataka.
