= Raptadu mandal =

Mandal in Andhra Pradesh, India

- Mandal
- Interactive Map Outlining mandal
- Location in Andhra Pradesh, India
- Coordinates: 14.6189°N 77.6039°E
- Country: India
- State: Andhra Pradesh
- District: Anantapur
- Headquarters: Raptadu

Area
  - Total: 268.15 km^{2} (103.53 sq mi)

Population (2011)
  - Total: 38,057
  - Density: 141.92/km^{2} (367.58/sq mi)

Languages
  - Official: Telugu
- Time zone: UTC+5:30 (IST)

Raptadu mandal is one of the 31 mandals in Anantapur district of the state of Andhra Pradesh in India. It is under the administration of Ananthapuramu revenue division and the headquarters are located at Raptadu village.

== Demographics ==
As of the 2011 Census of India, Raptadu mandal comprises 9,377 households. The total population is 38,057, with 19,558 males and 18,499 females. The child population is 4,039. Scheduled Castes constitute 5,089 of the population, while Scheduled Tribes account for 511 individuals. The number of literate individuals stands at 20,946. The workforce in Raptadu mandal includes 20,968 workers.

== Villages ==
List of villages/settlements in Raptadu mandal

1. Bandameedapalle
2. Bommaparthy
3. Bukkacherla
4. Gandlaparthi
5. Gangulakunta
6. Gondireddipalle
7. Hampapuram
8. Maroor
9. Palacherla
10. Raptadu (Part)
11. Yerragunta
12. Parasanaya palli
13. Chinmayanada Nagar
14. Ayyavari Palli
