= Kanekal =

Coordinates: 14°53′11″N 77°01′54″E

- Village
- Interactive map of Kanekal
- Country: India
- State: Andhra Pradesh
- District: Anantapur
- Talukas: Rayadurgam

Languages
  - Official: Telugu
- Time zone: UTC+5:30 (IST)
- PIN: 515871; STD Code : 08495
- Telephone code: 08495

Kanekal is a village in Anantapur district of the Indian state of Andhra Pradesh. It is the headquarters of Kanekal mandal in Kalyandurgam revenue division.
