= Kudair =

- village
- Interactive map of Kudair
- Location in Andhra Pradesh, India Kudair (India)
- Coordinates: 14.7333°N 77.4333°E
- Country: India
- State: Andhra Pradesh
- District: Anantapur
- Talukas: Kudair
- Elevation: 401 m (1,316 ft)

Languages
  - Official: Telugu
- Time zone: UTC+5:30 (IST)
- Vehicle registration: AP

Kudair is a village in Anantapur district of the Indian state of Andhra Pradesh. It is the mandal headquarters of Kudair mandal in Anantapur revenue division.
