= Bathalapalle =

- Interactive map of Bathalapalle
- Location in Andhra Pradesh, India
- Coordinates: 14°31′01″N 77°46′05″E
- Country: India
- State: Andhra Pradesh
- District: Sri Sathya Sai
- Talukas: Bathalapalle

Population (2011)
  - Total: 3,724

Languages
  - Official: Telugu
- Time zone: UTC+5:30 (IST)
- Vehicle registration: AP

Bathalapalle is a village in Sri Sathya Sai district of the Indian state of Andhra Pradesh. It is the mandal headquarters of Bathalapalle mandal in Dharmavaram revenue division. It is about 25 kilometres south east of Anantapur on National Highway 205.

== Geography ==
Battulapalle is located at 14.5167°N 77.7833°E. It has an average elevation of 340 metres (1118 ft).

== Demographics ==
According to the 2001 Indian census, the demographic details of Bathalapalle mandal is as follows:

- Total population: 35,318 in 8,326 households.
- Male population: 18,087 and female population: 17,231
- Children under 6 years of age: 4,386 (Boys - 2,243 and Girls - 2,143)
- Total literates: 15,983

Total workers are 21,215 depends on multi skills out of which 11,906 are men and 9,309 are women. Total 4,413 Cultivators are depended on agriculture farming out of 2,993 are cultivated by men and 1,420 are women. 4,651 people works in agricultural land as a labour in Bathalapalle, men are 2,309 and 2,342 are women.
