= Amarapuram, Sri Sathya Sai district =

Amarapuram
- Town
- Interactive map of Amarapuram
- Location in Andhra Pradesh, India
- Coordinates: 14.1333°N 76.9833°E
- Country: India
- State: Andhra Pradesh
- District: Sri Sathya Sai
- Mandal: Amarapuram
- Elevation: 603 m (1,978 ft)

Population (2001)
  - Total: 52,717

Languages
  - Official: Telugu
- Time zone: UTC+5:30 (IST)
- PIN: 515281
- Telephone code: 08493
- Vehicle registration: AP02
- Lok Sabha constituency: Hindupur
- Vidhan Sabha constituency: Madakasira
- Climate: hot (Köppen)

Amarapuram is a village and mandal headquarters of Amarapuram mandal, Sri Sathya Sai district, Andhra Pradesh.

== Geography ==
Amarapuram is located at 14.1333°N 76.9833°E. It has an average elevation of 603 metres (1981 ft).

== Demographics ==
According to Indian census, 2001, the demographic details of Amarapuram mandal is as follows:

- Total Population: 52,717 in 10,554 Households.
- Male Population: 26,854 and Female Population: 25,863
- Children Under 6-years of age: 7,136 (Boys – 3,663 and Girls – 3,473)
- Total Literates: 23,186
