= Putlur, Anantapur district =

Putlur
- Village
- Interactive map of Putlur
- Location in Andhra Pradesh, India Putlur (India)
- Coordinates: 14.8167°N 77.9667°E
- Country: India
- State: Andhra Pradesh
- District: Anantapur
- Talukas: Putlur
- Elevation: 246 m (807 ft)

Population (2001)
  - Total: 36,814

Languages
  - Official: Telugu
- Time zone: UTC+5:30 (IST)
- Vehicle registration: AP

Putlur is a village in Anantapur district of the Indian state of Andhra Pradesh. It is the headquarters of Putlur mandal in the Anantapur revenue division.

== Geography ==
Putluru is located at 14.8167°N 77.9667°E. It has an average elevation of 246 metres (810 ft).

== Demographics ==
According to the Indian census, 2001, the demographic details of the Putlur mandal is as follows:

- Total Population: 36,814 in 7,997 Households
- Male Population: 18,756 and Female Population: 18,058
- Children Under 6 Yrs: 4,780 (Boys – 2,366 and Girls – 2,414)
- Total Literates: 17,456
- Ellutla was Second biggest village from this mandal
