= Gummagatta =

- Village
- Interactive map of Gummagatta
- Location in Andhra Pradesh, India Gummagatta (India)
- Coordinates: 14°34′15″N 76°51′24″E
- Country: India
- State: Andhra Pradesh
- District: Anantapur
- Talukas: Gummagatta

Population (2011)
  - Total: 6,279

Languages
  - Official: Telugu
- Time zone: UTC+5:30 (IST)
- Vehicle registration: AP

Gummagatta is a village in Anantapur district of the Indian state of Andhra Pradesh. It is the headquarters of Gummagatta mandal in Kalyandurg revenue division.

== Demographics ==
As of 2011 census, Gummagatta had a population of 6,279. The total population constitutes 3,242 males and 3,037 females —a sex ratio of 937 females per 1000 males. 786 children are in the age group of 0–6 years, of which 423 are boys and 363 are girls —a ratio of 858 per 1000. The average literacy rate stands at 54.87% with 3,014 literates.
