= Bommanahal =

- Village
- Interactive map of Bommanahal
- Location in Andhra Pradesh, India Bommanahal (India)
- Coordinates: 14.993820°N 76.9783900°E
- Country: India
- State: Andhra Pradesh
- District: Anantapur
- Talukas: Bommanahal

Population
  - Total: 4,952

Languages
  - Official: Telugu
- Time zone: UTC+5:30 (IST)
- PIN: 515871
- Telephone code: 08495

Bommanahal is a village in Anantapur district of the Indian state of Andhra Pradesh. It is the headquarters of Bommanahal mandal in Kalyandurgam revenue division.

== Demographics ==
As of 2011 census, the village had a population of 4,952. The total population constitute, 2,508 males and 2,444 females —a sex ratio of 975 females per 1000 males. 582 children are in the age group of 0–6 years, of which 283 are boys and 299 are girls —a ratio of 1057 per 1000. The average literacy rate stands at 66.61% with 2,911 literates, lower than the state average of 67.41%.
