= Kundurpi =

- Village
- Interactive map of Kundurpi
- Location in Andhra Pradesh, India Kundurpi (India)
- Coordinates: 14.2833°N 77.0333°E
- Country: India
- State: Andhra Pradesh
- District: Anantapur
- Talukas: Kalyandurgam
- Elevation: 610 m (2,000 ft)

Languages
  - Official: Telugu
- Time zone: UTC+5:30 (IST)
- PIN: 515766
- Vehicle registration: AP

Kundurpi is a village in Anantapur district of the Indian state of Andhra Pradesh. It is the headquarters of Kundurpi mandal in Kalyandurgam revenue division.

== Demographics ==
According to Indian census, 2001, the demographic details of Kundurpi mandal is as follows:

- Total Population: 48,205 in 9,334 Households.
- Male Population: 24,699 and Female Population: 23,506
- Children Under 6-years of age: 7,226 (Boys – 3,675 and Girls - 3,551)
- Total Literates: 21,258
