= D. Hirehal =

- Village
- Interactive map of D. Hirehal
- Location in Andhra Pradesh, India
- Coordinates: 15.010536°N 76.836012°E
- Country: India
- State: Andhra Pradesh
- District: Anantapur
- Mandal: D. Hirehal

Government
  - MLA: Kalava Srinivasulu
  - Member of Parliament: G. Lakshminarayana

Population (2011)
  - Total: 8,996
  - Rank

Languages
  - Official: Telugu
- Time zone: UTC+5:30 (IST)
- Vehicle registration: AP

D. Hirehal is a village and in Anantapur district of the Indian state of Andhra Pradesh. It is in Kalyandurgam revenue division, and is the mandal headquarters of D. Hirehal mandal. It is part of Rayadurg Assembly constituency.

== Demographics ==
As of 2011 census, had a population of 8,996. The total population constitutes 4,567 males and 4,429 females, a sex ratio of 970 females per 1000 males. 1,187 children are in the age group of 0–6 years, of which 627 are boys and 560 are girls, a ratio of 893 per 1000. The average literacy rate stands at 70.89% with 4,647 literates, significantly higher than the state average of 67.41%.
