= Bukkarayasamudram =

- Village
- Interactive map of Bukkarayasamudram
- Location in Andhra Pradesh, India Bukkarayasamudram (India)
- Coordinates: 14.694444°N 77.638056°E
- Country: India
- State: Andhra Pradesh
- District: Anantapur
- Named for: Bukka Raya I
- Mandal: Bukkaraya Samudram

Population (2011)
  - Total: 2,200

Languages
  - Official: Telugu
- Time zone: UTC+5:30 (IST)
- Vehicle registration: AP

Bukkarayasamudram is a village in Anantapur district of the Indian state of Andhra Pradesh. It is the mandal headquarters of Bukkaraya Samudram mandal in Anantapur revenue division. It is named after Bukkaraya I.

== Demographics ==
As of 2011 census, the village had a population of 22,000. The total population constitutes 11,034 males and 10,966 females —a sex ratio of 994 females per 1100 males. 2,877 children are in the age group of 0–6 years, of which 1,487 are boys and 1,390 are girls —a ratio of 935 per 1000. The average literacy rate stands at 61.83% with 11,824 literates, significantly lower than the state average of 67.41%.
