= Ananthapuram =

- town panchayat
- Location in Tamil Nadu, India
- Coordinates: 12°7′16″N 79°23′2″E
- Country: India
- State: Tamil Nadu
- District: Viluppuram

Population (2001)
  - Total: 5,869

Languages
  - Official: Tamil
- Time zone: UTC+5:30 (IST)
- PIN: 605201
- Vehicle registration: TN 32

Ananthapuram is a panchayat town in Viluppuram district in the state of Tamil Nadu, India.

== Demographics ==
As of 2001 India census, Ananthapuram had a population of 5869. Males constitute 50% of the population and females 50%. Ananthapuram has an average literacy rate of 61%, higher than the national average of 59.5%; with 60% of the males and 40% of females literate. 11% of the population is under 6 years of age.
