= Singanamala =

- Village
- Interactive map of Singanamala
- Location in Andhra Pradesh, India Singanamala (India)
- Coordinates: 14.8000°N 77.7167°E
- Country: India
- State: Andhra Pradesh
- District: Anantapur
- Talukas: Singanamala
- Elevation: 287 m (942 ft)

Languages
  - Official: Telugu
- Time zone: UTC+5:30 (IST)
- Vehicle registration: AP

Singanamala is a village in Anantapur district of the Indian state of Andhra Pradesh. It is headquarters of Singanamala mandal in Anantapur revenue division.

== Geography ==
Singanamala is located at 14.8000°N 77.7167°E. It has an average elevation of 287 metres (942 ft).
