= Atmakur mandal, Anantapur district =

Atmakur mandal
- Mandal
- Interactive map of Atmakur mandal
- Location in Andhra Pradesh, India
- Coordinates: 14.6457°N 77.3565°E
- Country: India
- State: Andhra Pradesh
- District: Anantapur
- Headquarters: Atmakur

Area
  - Total: 268.19 km^{2} (103.55 sq mi)

Population (2011)
  - Total: 38,970
  - Density: 145.3/km^{2} (376.3/sq mi)

Languages
  - Official: Telugu
- Time zone: UTC+5:30 (IST)

Atmakur mandal is one of the 32 mandals in Anantapur district of the state of Andhra Pradesh in India. It is under the administration of Ananthapuramu revenue division and the headquarters are located at Atmakur town.

== Demographics ==
As of the 2011 Census of India, Atmakur mandal comprises 9,796 households. The total population is 38,970, with 20,037 males and 18,933 females. The child population is 4,367. Scheduled Castes constitute 6,306 of the population, while Scheduled Tribes account for 3,917 individuals.

The number of literate individuals stands at 21,001, highlighting a significant disparity between the literate and illiterate populations, the latter being 17,969. The workforce in Atmakur mandal includes 21,354 workers, while 17,616 individuals are categorized as non-workers.

== Villages ==
List of villages/settlements in Atmakur mandal

1. Atmakur
2. Brahmana Yaleru
3. Goridindla
4. Madigubba
5. Padamatiyaleru
6. Sanapa
7. Talupuru
8. Thopudurthi
