= Raptadu =

Village in Andhra Pradesh, India

- Mandal
- Raptadu
- Interactive map of Raptadu
- Location in Andhra Pradesh, India
- Coordinates: 14°37′04″N 77°36′19″E
- Country: India
- State: Andhra Pradesh
- District: Anantapur
- Mandals: Raptadu

Population (2011)
  - Total: 7,453

Languages
  - Official: Telugu
- Time zone: UTC+5:30 (IST)
- Postal code: 515722
- Vehicle registration: AP

Raptadu is a village in Raptadu mandal of Anantapur district in the Indian state of Andhra Pradesh.

As per the 2011 census of India, the village had a population of 7,453 spread over an area of 3,501 hectares with 1,776 households. The village had a male population of 3,857 and a female population of 3,596. The Scheduled Castes population was 1,099 and the Scheduled Tribes population was 69.

The census location code of the village is 595101.
