= Kambadur =

- Village
- Interactive map of Kambadur
- Location within Andhra Pradesh Location within India
- Coordinates: 14°20′47″N 77°13′47″E
- Country: India
- State: Andhra Pradesh
- District: Anantapur
- Talukas: Kambadur

Population (2001)
  - Total: 46,740

Languages
  - Official: Telugu
- Time zone: UTC+5:30 (IST)
- PIN: 515765

Kambadur is a village in Anantapur district of the Indian state of Andhra Pradesh. It is the headquarters of Kambadur mandal in Kalyandurgam revenue division.

== Demographics ==
According to Indian census, 2001, the demographic details of Kambadur mandal is as follows:

- Total Population: 46,740 in 9,522 Households.
- Male Population: 23,950 and Female Population: 22,790
- Children Under 6-years of age: 6,803 (Boys - 3,514 and Girls - 3,289)
- Total Literates: 21,390
