= Garladinne =

- Village
- Interactive map of Garladinne
- Location in Andhra Pradesh, India Garladinne (India)
- Coordinates: 14.8333°N 77.6000°E
- Country: India
- State: Andhra Pradesh
- District: Anantapur
- Talukas: Garladinne
- Elevation: 315 m (1,033 ft)

Population (2011)
  - Total: 7,766

Languages
  - Official: Telugu
- Time zone: UTC+5:30 (IST)
- PIN: 515731
- Vehicle registration: AP

Garladinne is a village in Anantapur district of the Indian state of Andhra Pradesh. It is the mandal headquarters of Garladinne mandal in Anantapur revenue division.

== Geography ==
Garladinne is located at 14.8333°N 77.6000°E. It has an average elevation of 315 metres (1,036 ft).

== Demographics ==
In the 2011 census, the village had a population of 7,766 (3,947 males and 3,819 females — a sex ratio of 968 females per 1,000 males). 889 were aged 0–6 years, of whom 507 were boys and 382 girls — a ratio of 754 per 1,000. The average literacy rate was 64.9% with 4,463 literates.
