= Kalyandurgam revenue division =

- Revenue division in Ananthapuram district
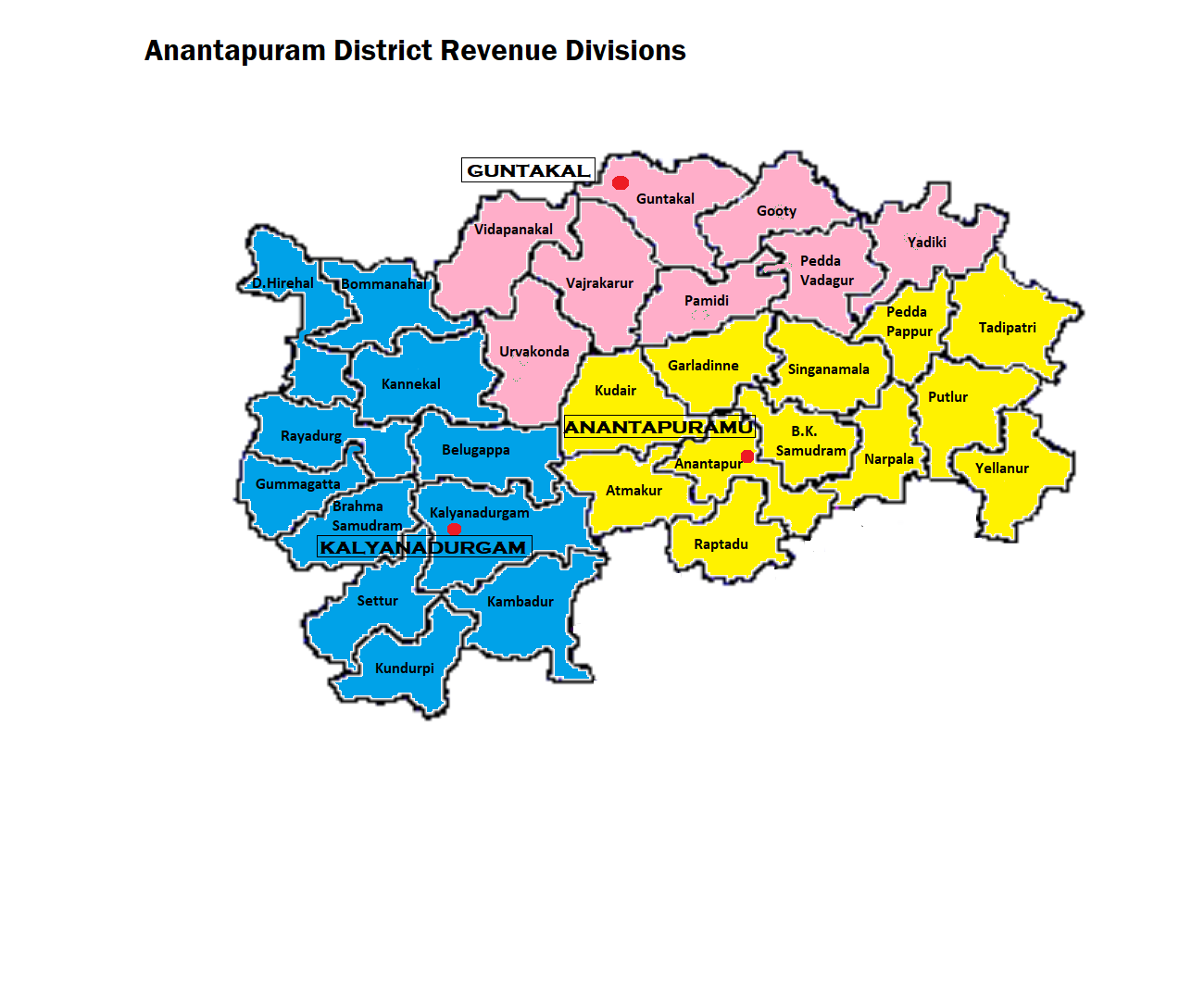
- Kalyandurgam revenue division in Anantapur district
- Country: India
- State: Andhra Pradesh
- District: Ananthapuram
- Headquarters: Kalyandurgam

Kalyandurgam revenue division (or Kalyandurgam division) is an administrative division in the Ananthapuram district of the Indian state of Andhra Pradesh. It is one of the 3 revenue divisions in the district with 11 mandals under its administration. The divisional headquarters is located at Kalyandurg.

== History ==
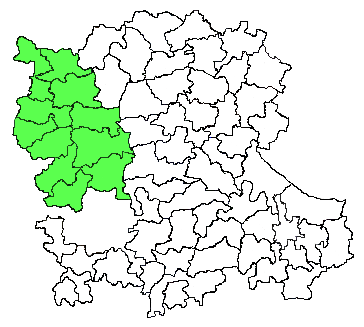

Kalyandurgam revenue division in old Ananthapuram district

== Administration ==
The 11 mandals administered under Kalyandurgam are:

1. Beluguppa
2. Bommanahal
3. Brahmasamudram
4. D.Hirehal
5. Gummagatta
6. Kalyandurg
7. Kambadur
8. Kanekal
9. Kundurpi
10. Rayadurgam
11. Settur

== See also ==
- List of revenue divisions in Andhra Pradesh
