= Ananthapuramu revenue division =

Coordinates: 14.68189°N 77.60059°E

- Revenue division in Anantapur district
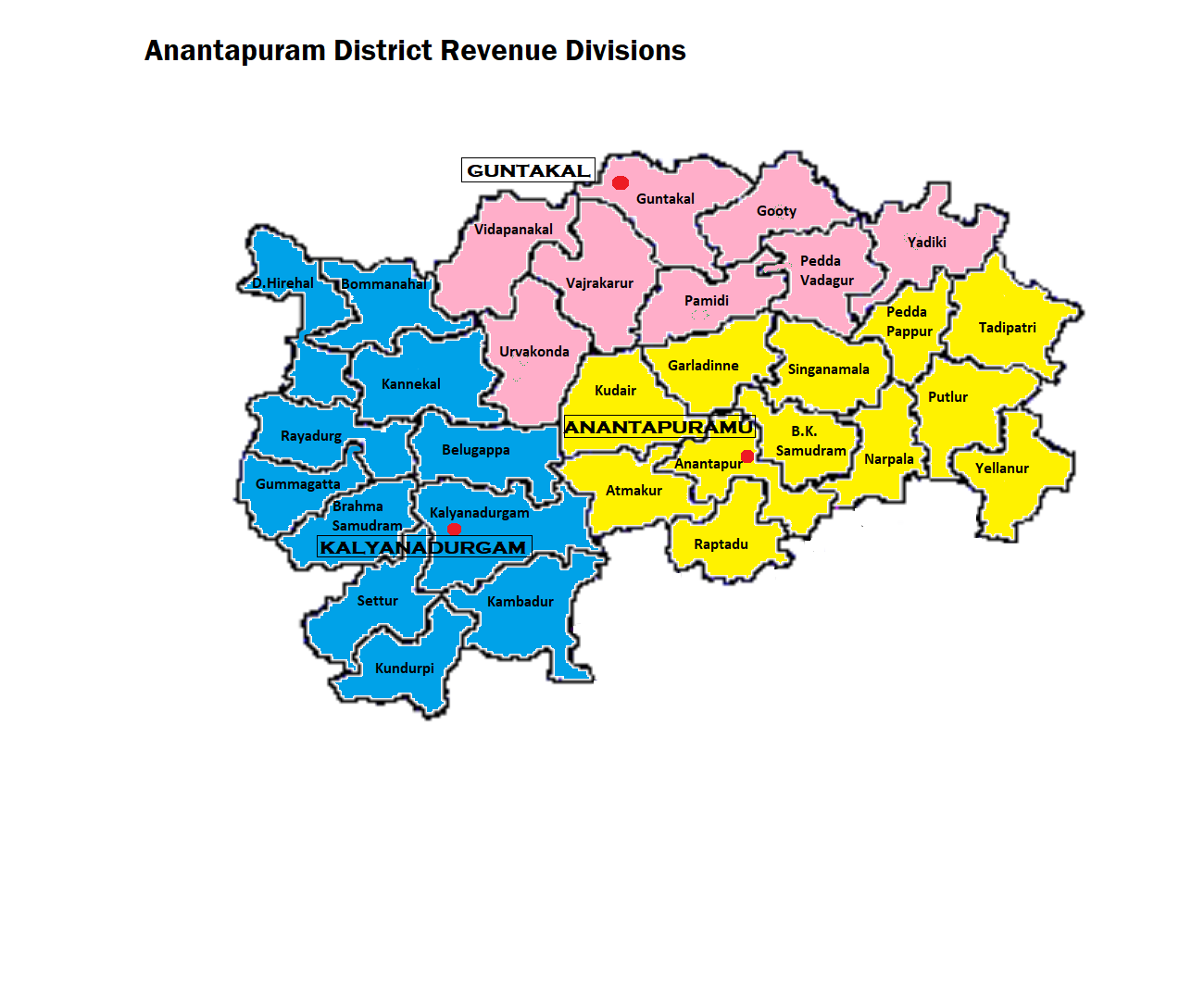
- Anantapuram revenue division in Ananthapuram district prior to Ananthapuram mandal subdivision on 8 May 2023
- Country: India
- State: Andhra Pradesh
- District: Ananthapuram
- Headquarters: Ananthapuram

Ananthapuramu revenue division is an administrative division in the Ananthapuram district of the Indian state of Andhra Pradesh. It is one of the 3 revenue divisions in the district with 12 mandals under its administration. The divisional headquarters is located at Ananthapuram.

== Administration ==
There are 13 mandals administered under Anantapur revenue division are:

1. Anantapur Urban
2. Anantapur Rural
3. Atmakur
4. Bukkaraya Samudram
5. Garladinne
6. Kudair
7. Narpala
8. Peddapappur
9. Putlur
10. Raptadu
11. Singanamala
12. Tadipatri
13. Yellanur

== See also ==
- List of revenue divisions in Andhra Pradesh
