= Anantapur =

- City
- Ananthapuramu
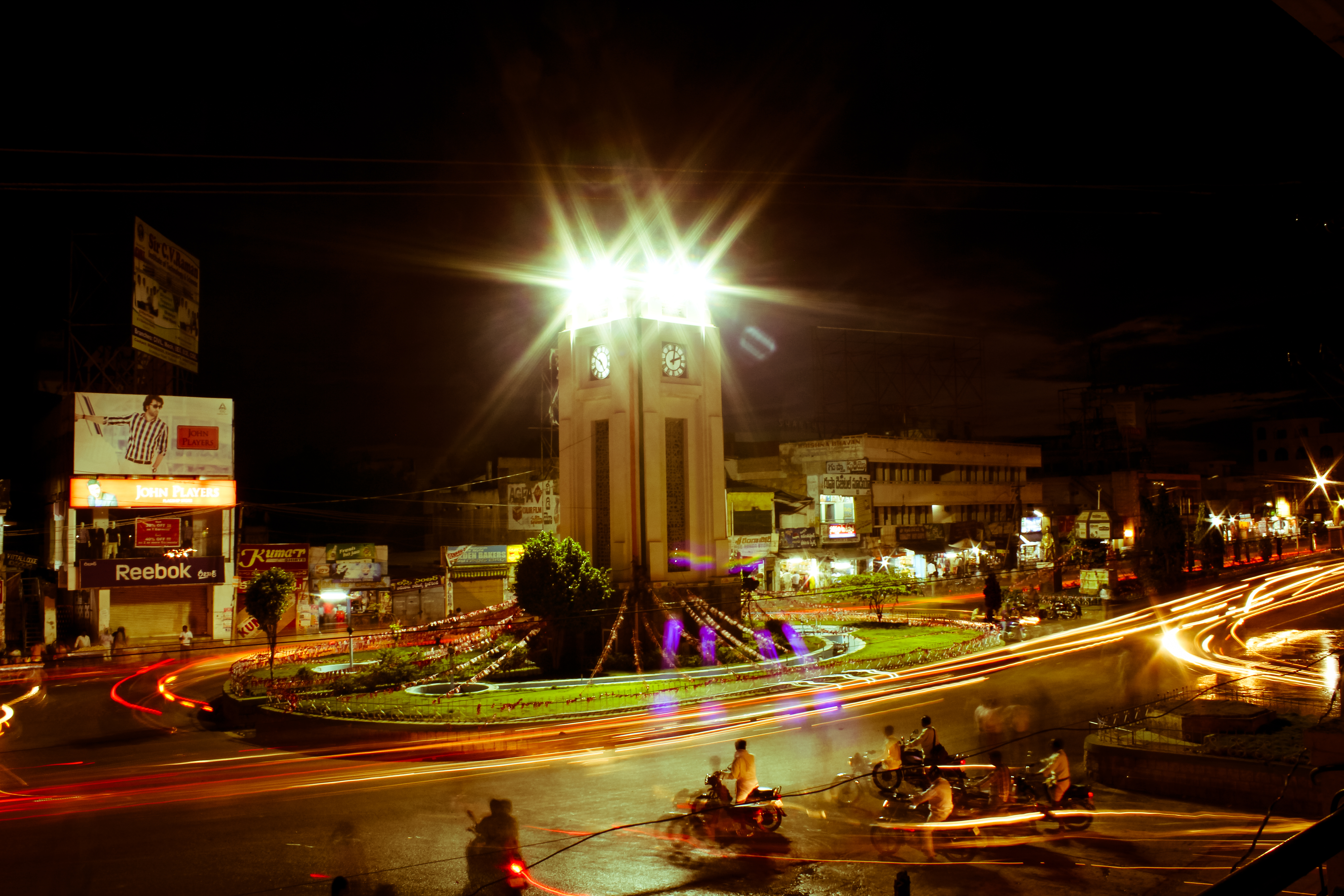
- Clock tower at Anantapur
- Interactive map of Anantapur
- Location within Andhra Pradesh Location within India Location within Asia
- Coordinates: 14.68°N 77.599°E
- Country: India
- State: Andhra Pradesh
- District: Anantapuramu

Government
  - Body: Anantapur Municipal Corporation, Anantapur–Hindupur Urban Development Authority

Area
  - Total: 105.98 km^{2} (40.92 sq mi)
- Elevation: 335 m (1,099 ft)

Population (2011)
  - Total: 340,613
  - Rank: [126th] in India ,[10th] in Andhra Pradesh
  - Density: 3,213.9/km^{2} (8,324.1/sq mi)

Languages
  - Official: Telugu
- Time zone: UTC+5:30 (IST)
- PIN: 515001, 515002, 515003, 515004, 515005 515281, 515731 and Complete Anantapur Pincode List
- Telephone code: 08554
- Vehicle registration: AP-02
- Website: anantapur.cdma.ap.gov.in

Anantapur, officially Ananthapuramu, is a city in Anantapur district of the Indian state of Andhra Pradesh. It is the mandal headquarters of Anantapur mandal and also the divisional headquarters of Anantapur revenue division. The city is located on National Highway 44. Anantapur was the headquarters of the Datta Mandalam (Rayalaseema districts of Andhra Pradesh and Bellary district of Karnataka) in 1799, and was also a location of strategic importance for the British Indian Army during the Second World War. The GDP of Anantapur City is $ 1.728 Billion.

== Geography ==
Anantapur is located at 14.68°N 77.6°E. It has an average elevation of 335 m (1,099 ft). It is located at a distance of 484 km from Vijayawada, 148 km from Kurnool and 210 km from Bengaluru which is the closest international airport.

=== Climate ===
Anantapur has a semi-arid climate, with hot and dry conditions for most of the year. Summer start in late February and peak in May with average high temperatures around the 37 °C (99 °F) range. Anantapur gets pre-monsoon showers starting as early as March, mainly through north-easterly winds blowing in from Kerala. Monsoon arrives in September and lasts until early November with about 250 mm (9.8 in) of precipitation. A dry and mild winter starts in late November and lasts until early February; with little humidity and average temperatures in the 22–23 °C (72–73 °F) range. Total annual rainfall is about 23 in (580 mm).

Climate data for Anantapur (1991–2020, extremes 1946–present)
Month	Jan	Feb	Mar	Apr	May	Jun	Jul	Aug	Sep	Oct	Nov	Dec	Year
Record high °C (°F)	36.1 (97.0)	39.4 (102.9)	41.8 (107.2)	43.2 (109.8)	44.1 (111.4)	43.1 (109.6)	38.8 (101.8)	38.9 (102.0)	37.9 (100.2)	39.2 (102.6)	36.8 (98.2)	33.8 (92.8)	44.1 (111.4)
Mean daily maximum °C (°F)	31.7 (89.1)	34.5 (94.1)	38.1 (100.6)	39.9 (103.8)	39.4 (102.9)	35.8 (96.4)	33.9 (93.0)	33.2 (91.8)	33.0 (91.4)	32.4 (90.3)	30.8 (87.4)	30.1 (86.2)	34.4 (93.9)
Daily mean °C (°F)	24.5 (76.1)	27.0 (80.6)	30.5 (86.9)	32.9 (91.2)	32.7 (90.9)	30.2 (86.4)	28.9 (84.0)	28.3 (82.9)	28.0 (82.4)	27.3 (81.1)	25.4 (77.7)	23.8 (74.8)	28.3 (82.9)
Mean daily minimum °C (°F)	16.9 (62.4)	19.2 (66.6)	22.6 (72.7)	25.7 (78.3)	26.2 (79.2)	24.9 (76.8)	24.2 (75.6)	23.8 (74.8)	23.3 (73.9)	22.1 (71.8)	20.0 (68.0)	17.3 (63.1)	22.2 (72.0)
Record low °C (°F)	9.0 (48.2)	10.4 (50.7)	13.4 (56.1)	18.3 (64.9)	18.8 (65.8)	19.6 (67.3)	19.6 (67.3)	19.9 (67.8)	19.3 (66.7)	14.1 (57.4)	10.0 (50.0)	9.4 (48.9)	9.0 (48.2)
Average rainfall mm (inches)	3.0 (0.12)	1.2 (0.05)	5.0 (0.20)	32.0 (1.26)	64.1 (2.52)	69.2 (2.72)	68.7 (2.70)	110.2 (4.34)	139.1 (5.48)	112.8 (4.44)	49.8 (1.96)	8.5 (0.33)	663.8 (26.13)
Average rainy days	0.2	0.2	0.2	1.6	3.1	4.0	4.5	5.2	7.0	6.2	2.8	0.7	35.7
Average relative humidity (%) (at 17:30 IST)	35	28	25	25	32	46	51	54	55	57	54	47	42
Source 1: India Meteorological Department
Source 2: Tokyo Climate Center (mean temperatures 1991–2020)

Anantapur has been ranked 31st best “National Clean Air City” under (Category 2 3-10L Population cities) in India.

== Demographics ==
As of 2011 census, Anantapur city has a population of 340,613. The sex ratio was 995 females per 1000 males and 9% of the population was under 6 years old. Effective literacy is 82%, male literacy is 89% and female literacy is 75%. Telugu is the official and widely spoken language, in addition to it Urdu, Hindi, Kannada and Tamil languages are also spoken by significant minorities in the city.

== Governance ==
=== Civic administration ===
Anantapur Municipal Corporation is the civic body of Anantapur district. Anantapur was originally established as a municipality in 1869. It was a municipality for more than a century before being transformed into a full-fledged municipal corporation in 2004 to better manage the administrative and infrastructure needs of its expanding urban population. There are 50 wards under the Anantapur Municipal Corporation and it is subdivided into 74 sachivalayams. It looks after Administration, Town Planning, Engineering, Public Health and Sanitation.

M Jaswantha Rao is the Commissioner of the Anantapur Municipal Corporation. The Mayor is Mohammed Wasim Salim and the Deputy Mayor is Dasari Vasanthi Sahithya.

National programmes such as AMRUT 2.0, PMAY-U, Swachhata Hi Seva 2026 have been implemented in Anantapur.

=== Public utilities ===
Anantapur Drinking Water Supply Project and Sri Sathya Sai Central Trust have stepped forward in supplying clean water and concentrated mainly on eradicating fluorosis. The corporation supplies chlorinated water to the city from the summer storage tank located in the town.

== Transport ==
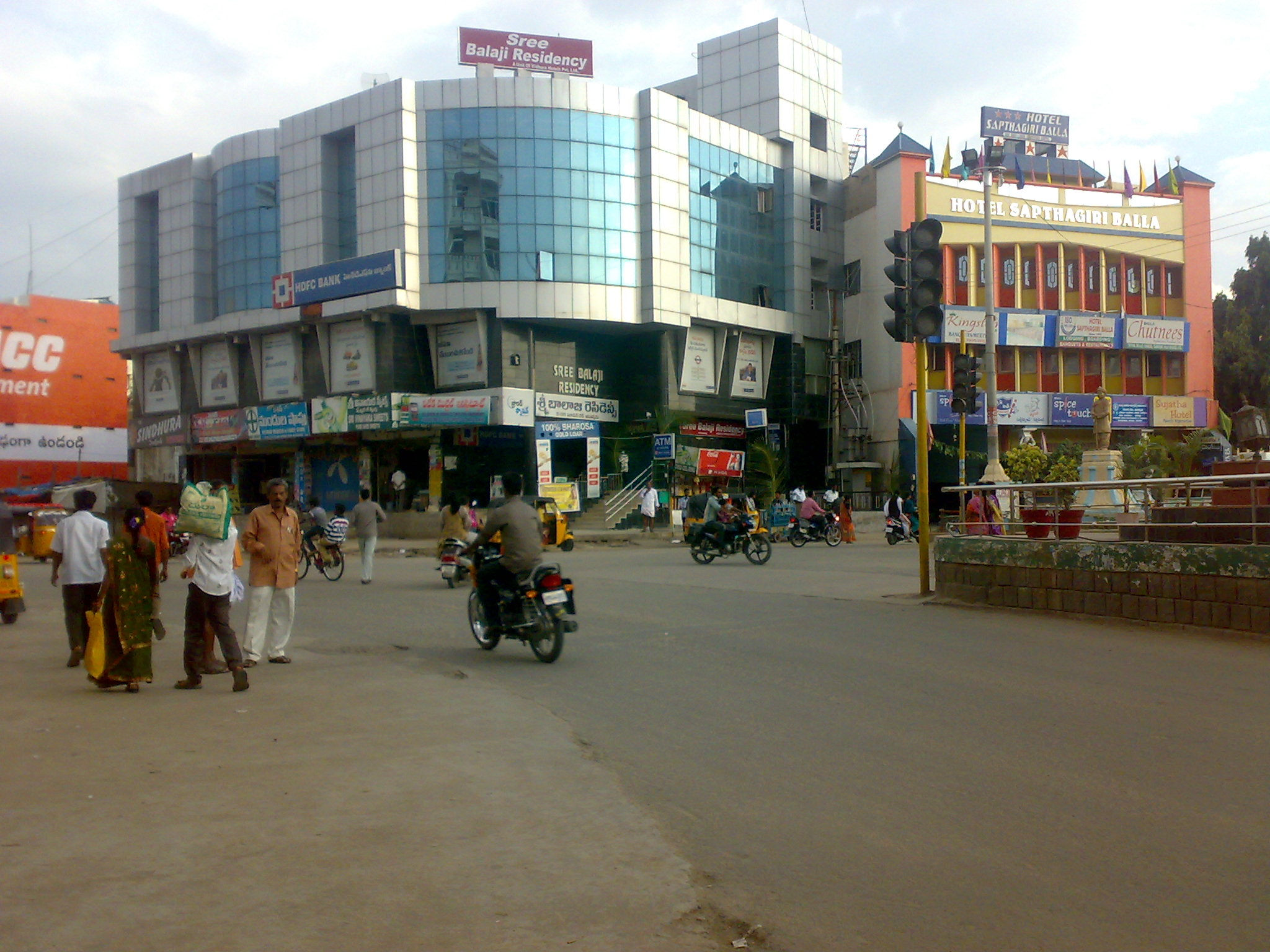
Saptagiri Circle

Anantapur is well connected to the nearby major cities with National Highway 44 and National Highway 205 of National Highway network of India. The NH–44 connects it to Bangalore, which is towards south and Hyderabad, towards north, and NH 205 connects it to Chennai via Renigunta. The Andhra Pradesh State Road Transport Corporation operates bus services from Anantapur bus station. The city has a total road length of 298.12 km.

Anantapur provides rail connectivity for the city and is classified as an A–category station in Guntakal railway division of South Central Railway zone. The nearest International airport is Kempegowda International Airport, Bengaluru which is 190 kilometers away.

== Culture ==
There are a few notable people from the town with their contributions to various fields such as politics, film industry and other areas. Neelam Sanjiva Reddy, the former President of India and the first Chief Minister of Andhra Pradesh. Paidi Lakshmayya, the first member of Parliament from Anantapur's Lok Sabha Constituency. Kallur Subba Rao, an Indian freedom activist who was also the first speaker of Andhra Assembly, as well as Kadiri Venkata Reddy, who was an Indian film director, writer and also a producer. Sathya Sai Baba, a godman and philanthropist. Bellary Raghava, an Indian playwright, thespian and film actor.

=== Cuisine ===
Millets such as, Jowar, Bajra, Ragi are the food grains mostly used in daily foods. Peanuts are consumed widely in everyday foods like Chutney, Chikki and also enjoyed as a snack, boiled and roasted. Uggani is also a very popular breakfast.

=== Cityscape ===
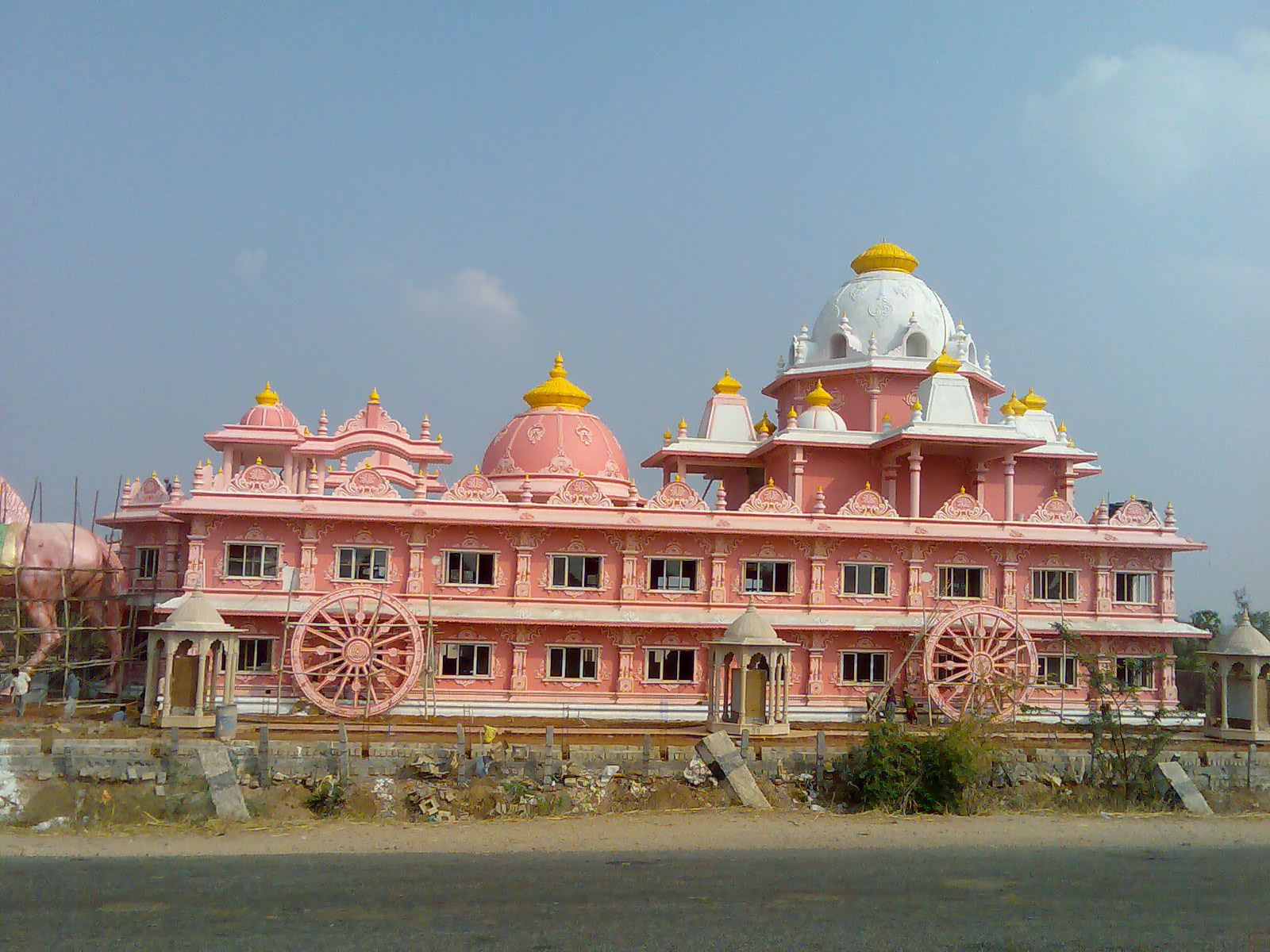
ISKCON temple, Anantapur

Neighbourhoods and landmarks in and around the city are - Clock Tower, Sapthagiri Circle, ISKCON Temple, the Railway Station area, Bus Station, Srikantam Circle, Government Hospital, Court Road etc. A major landmark in city is the railway overbridge near Clock Tower connecting the Newtown, constructed in late 1960s. As part of connecting the heart of city with NH44, this landmark is in demolition and closed till new four-lane flyover is functional.

== Education ==
The primary and secondary education is imparted by government, aided and private schools of the School Education Department of the state. The mediums of instruction that are followed by different CBSE schools like Kendriya Vidyalaya and Montessori Elite EM School, State board English mediums and Telugu mediums.

Anantapur is an important education centre of the district which has many schools, colleges and universities. Prominent institutions and universities include

- Jawaharlal Nehru Technological University, Anantapur,
- Government Medical College, Anantapur
- Sri Sathya Sai Institute of Higher Learning
- Central University of Andhra Pradesh.

== Sports ==
Anantapur has many sports facilities and hosted the Irani Cup in 1963–64 when Rest of India scored their lowest total of 83 against the then Ranji trophy winners Bombay, played at the Sanjeeva Reddy stadium. Several Ranji trophy matches and other regional tournaments for basketball, badminton, etc. have been hosted in Anantapur.

The Anantapur Sports Village (ASV), located alongside the National Highway 7. The Anantapur Cricket Ground sits within a 40-acre (160,000 m^{2}) complex which is managed by the Rural Development Trust (RDT). In October 2010, Rafael Nadal opened the Rafael Nadal Tennis School, which hosts district, state and national-level tournaments, as well as laying equal emphasis on the children's education and tennis training. There are several Indoor Stadiums for Basketball and Badminton under local bodies which conducts District, State and National Competitions. There are many coaching class for taekwondo and Karate. There are also coaching centres for swimming which conduct district competitions.

== Temples ==
There are four temples under the management of Endowments Department.

- Sri Kasivisweswara & Kodanda Rama Swamy Temples
- Sri Virupakeshwara & Obuleswara Swamy Temple
- Sri Peta Basaveswara Swamy Temple
- Sri Rama Swamy temple
- Sri Lakshmi Chennakesava Swamy Temple, Old Town

There are also several important temples which became landmarks, such as:

- ISKCON temple
- Sri Mounagiri Kshetram (39ft height Monolithic Hanuman statue)
- Shivakoti temple
- Harihara Temple
- Sri Anjanayaswamy Temple
- Musalamma Katta

== See also ==
- Havaligi
- List of Urban Agglomerations in Andhra Pradesh
- List of municipal corporations in Andhra Pradesh
- List of tourist attractions in Anantapur district
