= List of districts of Andhra Pradesh =

Districts of Andhra Pradesh
- Andhra Pradesh Political Map
- Category: Districts
- Location: Andhra Pradesh
- Number: 28
- Populations: Polavaram – 3,49,953 (lowest); Nellore – 2,963,557(highest)
- Areas: Visakhapatnam – 1,048 km^{2} (405 sq mi) (smallest); YSR Kadapa – 12,507 km^{2} (4,829 sq mi) (largest)
- Government: Government of Andhra Pradesh
- Subdivisions: Revenue Divisions of Andhra Pradesh

The state of Andhra Pradesh has 28 districts. Visakhapatnam district is the smallest district in area while Kadapa district is the largest. Nellore district is the most populous whereas Polavaram district is the least populous district. The districts are further divided into one, two or more revenue divisions, which are further subdivided into mandals for administrative purposes.

== History ==
At the time of Independence the present day Andhra Pradesh was a part of the Madras State. The Telugu speaking dominant regions Kostaandhra and Rayalaseema were separated from Madras State to form Andhra State in 1953.

As Andhra State, it consisted of 11 districts, which are Anantapur, Chittoor, East Godavari, Guntur, Kadapa, Krishna, Kurnool, Nellore, Srikakulam, Visakhapatnam and West Godavari.

As a result of the 1956 States Reorganisation Act, the state's boundaries were re-organized following linguistic lines. On 1 November 1956, the Andhra State and the Telangana region of the Hyderabad State were merged to form the Andhra Pradesh which is retrospectively referred to as United Andhra Pradesh.

As united Andhra Pradesh, it consisted of 21 districts, with 10 districts of Telangana region. In the year 1959, Bhadrachalam and Nuguru Venkatapuram taluks of East Godavari district, which are on the other side of the Godavari River, were merged into Khammam district on grounds of geographical contiguity and administrative viability. Similarly Aswaraopeta part of West Godavari District was added to Khammam district and Munagala taluk belonging to Krishna district was added to Nalgonda district in the same year.

The number of districts became 23 with the formation of Prakasam district from the parts of Guntur, Nellore and Kurnool districts in 1970 and Vizianagaram district from parts of Visakhapatnam and Srikakulam districts in 1979.

After the bifurcation of the United Andhra Pradesh in 2014, the Andhra region now known as Andhra Pradesh was left with 13 districts but was given several tribal-dominated mandals from the Khammam district of the Telangana as part of the Polavaram project. These mandals were added to the East Godavari and West Godavari district's respectively.

On 26 January 2022, the Government of Andhra Pradesh proposed 13 new districts by issuing a draft notification under the Andhra Pradesh Districts (Formation) Act, 1974, Section 3(5). After taking the objections and suggestions received from the public into consideration, the government has published the final notification on 3 April 2022. With effect from 4 April 2022 the newly formed districts came into effect as specified in the schedule. At present there are 26 districts spread across 3 cultural regions: Uttaraandhra, Kostaandhra and Rayalaseema.

The government formed Markapuram and Polavaram districts with effect from 31 December 2025 after receiving proposals from public.By this the districts count is increased from 26 to 28.

=== Timeline ===
==== Major changes ====
(1956-1959)

(1959-1960)

(1960-1970)

(1970-1978)

(1978-1979)

(1979–2014)

(2014–2022)

(2022–2025)

(31 Dec 2025-)

==== Minor changes ====
- Andhra Pradesh districts (16 Feb 2023–30 Dec 2025)

== Districts ==
The state is further divided into 28 districts, with North Andhra comprising seven districts, Coastal Andhra comprising twelve districts, and Rayalaseema comprising nine districts. These districts are made up of 81 revenue divisions, 688 mandals and 13,324 village panchayats as part of the administrative organisation.

=== Districts by regions ===
North Andhra (Uttarandhra):

1. Alluri Sitharama Raju
2. Anakapalli
3. Parvathipuram Manyam
4. Srikakulam
5. Visakhapatnam
6. Vizianagaram

Coastal Andhra (Kosta Andhra):

1. Bapatla
2. Konaseema
3. East Godavari
4. Eluru
5. Guntur
6. Kakinada
7. Krishna
8. NTR
9. Palnadu
10. Polavaram
11. Prakasam
12. Nellore
13. West Godavari

Rayalaseema:

1. Ananthapuramu
2. Annamayya
3. Chittoor
4. YSR Kadapa
5. Kurnool
6. Nandyal
7. Markapuram
8. Sri Sathya Sai
9. Tirupati

=== Existing districts ===
District statistics (Population, Area, density need updation as per the latest district restructure)
S.No	Code	Official name	Headquarters	Revenue divisions	Mandals	Population	Area	Density	Map
1	ALL	Alluri Sitharama Raju	Paderu	1	11	604,031	6,251	77.87	
2	AKP	Anakapalli	Anakapalli	3	24	1,726,998	4,292	402.38	
3	ANA	Ananthapuramu	Anantapuram	3	32	2,241,105	10,205	219.61	
4	ANN	Annamayya	Madanapalli	3	25	1,697,308	7,954	213.39	
5	BAP	Bapatla	Bapatla	3	20	1,586,918	3,829	414.45	
6	CHI	Chittoor	Chittoor	3	28	1,872,951	6,855	273.22	
7	KON	Dr. B. R. Ambedkar Konaseema	Amalapuram	3	19	1,719,093	2,083	825.30	
8	EAS	East Godavari	Rajamahendravaram	2	22	1,832,332	2,561	715.48	
9	ELU	Eluru	Eluru	3	28	2,006,737	6,579	305.02	
10	GUN	Guntur	Guntur	2	18	2,091,075	2,443	855.95	
11	KAK	Kakinada	Kakinada	2	21	2,092,374	3,019	693.07	
12	KRI	Krishna	Machilipatnam	3	26	1,735,079	3,775	459.62	
13	KUR	Kurnool	Kurnool	3	27	2,271,686	7,980	284.67	
14	MAR	Markapuram	Markapuram	2	21	1,142,313	10,035	190.4	
15	NAN	Nandyal	Nandyal	4	30	1,781,777	9,682	184.03	
16	NEL	Sri Potti Sriramulu Nellore	Nellore	3	36	2,963,557	10,441	236.54	
17	NTR	NTR	Vijayawada	3	20	2,218,591	3,316	669.06	
18	PAL	Palnadu	Narasaraopeta	3	28	2,041,723	7,298	279.76	
19	PAR	Parvathipuram Manyam	Parvathipuram	2	15	925,340	3,659	252.89	
20	POL	Polavaram	Rampachodavaram	2	12	349,929	6,058	58.32	
21	PRA	Prakasam	Ongole	3	28	1,767,633	6,322	259.76	
22	SRI	Srikakulam	Srikakulam	3	30	2,191,471	4,591	477.34	
23	SSS	Sri Sathya Sai	Puttaparthi	5	32	1,840,043	8,925	206.17	
24	TIR	Tirupati	Tirupati	4	36	2,196,984	8,231	266.92	
25	VSP	Visakhapatnam	Visakhapatnam	2	11	1,959,544	1,048	1869.79	
26	VIZ	Vizianagaram	Vizianagaram	3	28	1,930,811	4,122	468.42	
27	WES	West Godavari	Bhimavaram	3	20	1,844,898	2,278	809.88	
28	CUD	YSR Kadapa	Kadapa	5	40	2,060,654	11,228	183.53	

=== Clickable map of existing districts ===
Districts in Andhra Pradesh, zoom and click for interactive identification map

== Regional development clusters ==
The Government of Andhra Pradesh has also proposed three new regional development clusters to promote balanced growth across the state. These regions group nearby districts based on geography and economic potential. For instance, the Tirupati region includes all Rayalaseema districts such as Ananthapuramu, Sri Sathya Sai, Kurnool, Nandyal, YSR Kadapa, Annamayya, Chittoor, and Tirupati, along with SPSR Nellore district. Similarly, the Visakhapatnam region covers the North Coastal districts including Alluri Sitharama Raju, Anakapalli, Parvathipuram Manyam, Polavaram, Srikakulam, Visakhapatnam, Vizianagaram,along with Kakinada, East Godavari and West Godavari and The Amaravati–Vijayawada region includes Bapatla, East Godavari, Eluru, Guntur, Kakinada,Konaseema, Krishna, Markapuram, NTR, Palnadu and Prakasam. These regional clusters are aimed at improving infrastructure, industrial development, and administrative coordination across Andhra Pradesh.

== See also ==
- List of mandals in Andhra Pradesh
- List of districts in India
- List of revenue divisions in Andhra Pradesh

== Sources ==
- DOP (2023). Socio economic survey 2022–23 (PDF). Government of AP. Archived from the original (PDF) on 28 March 2024.
