= Kadiri Taluk =

Taluk in Andhra Pradesh, India

The British Raj established the Kadiri Taluk, which was located in the Kadapa district. however it was integrated into the Anantapur district in 1910. With around 210 villages under its control, Kadiri Taluk was Andhra Pradesh's and India's largest taluk at the time. The revenue mandals where the villages are presently located are Kadiri, Mudigubba, Nallamada, N.P. Kunta, Talupula, Nallacheruvu, O. D. Cheruvu, Tanakal, Amadagur, and Gandlapenta. These mandals, with the exception of Mudigubba, are currently under the Kadiri revenue division. Puttaparthi, Nallamada, and Kothacheruvu Mandals are now included. When the taluk system was abolished and the mandal system was implemented, the Kadiri Taluk was split into almost 12 mandals, which shocked tax authorities. Kadiri Taluk was well known in Andhra Pradesh due to its large population and size.
