= Bengaluru–Vijayawada Expressway =

Under-construction expressway between Bengaluru and Vijayawada in India

Route information
- Maintained by National Highways Authority of India (NHAI)
- Length: 518 km (322 mi)
- Existed: 2026/27–present

Major junctions
- West end: 1. NH-44, Bengaluru, Karnataka; 2. Kodikonda, Sri Sathya Sai district, Andhra Pradesh
- East end: 1. NH-16, Vijayawada, Andhra Pradesh; 2. Addanki, Prakasam district, Andhra Pradesh

Location
- Country: India
- States: Karnataka, Andhra Pradesh
- Districts: Karnataka: Bengaluru Urban district, Bengaluru Rural district, Chikkaballapura district, Andhra Pradesh: Sri Sathya Sai district, Kadapa district, Nellore district, Prakasam district, Guntur district, Krishna district, NTR district
- Towns: Bengaluru, Chikkaballapur, Kodikonda, Gorantla, Nallamada, puttaparthi,Kadiri, Pulivendula,Yerraguntla, Kadapa, Mydukur, Mallepalle, Vangapadu, Addanki, Podili, kanigiri,Guntur, Mangalagiri, Amaravati and NH16 in Guntur

Highway system
- Roads in India; Expressways; National; State; Asian

The Bengaluru–Vijayawada Expressway, classified as NH-544G, is an under-construction 518 km (322 mi)-long, six-lane access-controlled expressway between the cities of Bengaluru and Vijayawada, via Kadiri, Kadapa. It will pass through 11 districts –3 in Karnataka and 8 in Andhra Pradesh. It will start from the existing National Highway 44 (NH-44) at Kodikonda in Sri Sathya Sai district of Andhra Pradesh, which connects Bengaluru and beyond to the south, pass through the Rayalaseema region and end in National Highway 16 (NH-16) at Addanki in Prakasam district of Andhra Pradesh, which connects Vijayawada and eastern India to the north. By joining the existing national highways to link the two cities, the overall length of the expressway is about 624 km (388 mi). It will be operated and maintained by the National Highways Authority of India (NHAI), and will reduce both travel time and distance from 12–13 hours to only 8–9 hours, and from 630 to 518 km (391 to 322 mi). It will be built at a cost of about ₹14,000 crore (US$1.5 billion), which was earlier slated at ₹19,320 crore (US$2.0 billion).

The expressway will have three sections of brownfield and greenfield sections, of which the 343 km (213 mi)-long main section from Kodikonda to Addanki will be greenfield, while the remaining two highway sections till Bengaluru and Guntur will be brownfield. Of the total 624 km (388 mi), it will be 36% brownfield and 64% greenfield. The project is a part of Bharatmala Pariyojana Phase-II. The preparatory works for the expressway's construction are ongoing since March 2023, after all 14 packages of the expressway were awarded to contractors in February 2023. The foundation stone for the expressway was laid by Prime Minister Narendra Modi on 11 March 2024. It is expected to be completed by 2026/27.

== History ==
Due to rapidly increasing traffic, congestion, and demands in the existing national highways in southern India, the capital of Karnataka, Bengaluru, remains disconnected to eastern and north-east India because of the traffic constraints and limited capacities of the highways. To get access to eastern and north-eastern India, it currently takes about 12–13 hours to reach Vijayawada either through Chennai or National Highway 16 (NH-16). This contributes to significant congestion, delays, pollution and risk of mishaps. Hence, in 2021, the Government of Andhra Pradesh submitted a proposal to the Government of India to build a new expressway connecting Bengaluru and Vijayawada, and the plan was approved by the Government of India in August of the same year. The expressway would cover a distance 360 km (220 mi) of the total distance of 570 km (350 mi), through Anantapur. The remaining 110 km (68 mi) would be covered by connecting with the existing national highways. It would be built at a cost of ₹10,000 crore (US$1.0 billion), and would reduce the travel time and distance between the two cities by at least 75 km (47 mi) and 3 hours. The initial plan was revised in September 2022 when the National Highways Authority of India (NHAI) declared the expressway as National Highway 544G (NH-544G), and began to invite the tenders for its construction in December 2022, the month from which the land acquisition also began. The expressway will now be built at a cost of ₹19,320 crore (US$2.0 billion) and will cover a total distance of 624 km (388 mi), of which 518 km (322 mi) will be the main greenfield section within Andhra Pradesh, while the remaining brownfield portions will connect the two cities through the existing national highways.

All 14 packages of the construction were awarded by February 2023. Since March 2023, the preparatory works for the construction have been ongoing. Therefore, the foundation stone of the expressway was laid by Prime Minister Narendra Modi on 11 March 2024. The project's cost has been revised to ₹14,000 crore (US$1.5 billion), and is expected to be completed by 2026/27.

== Route ==
The expressway will start from Kodikonda in Sri Sathya Sai district of Andhra Pradesh, from where it will be linked with National Highway 44 (NH-44) to link Bengaluru. Then, it will pass through the Rayalaseema region and Podili, Kanigiri Prakasam district before ending in Muppavaram, located in Prakasam district of Andhra Pradesh, from where it will be linked with National Highway 16 (NH-16) to link Vijayawada. The expressway will pass through the following towns in Karnataka and Andhra Pradesh.

=== Karnataka ===
- Bengaluru
- Yelahanka
- Devanahalli
- Chikkaballapur
- Bagepalli

=== Andhra Pradesh ===
- Kodikonda
- Gorantla
- Kadiri
- Nallamada
- Pulivendula
- Yerraguntla
- Mydukur
- Porumamilla
- Chandrasekharapuram
- Kanigiri
- Podili
- Addanki
- Muppavaram
- Chilakaluripet
- Guntur
- Mangalagiri
- Vijayawada

== Construction ==
The National Highways Authority of India (NHAI) has divided the expressway's construction into 14 packages, which include only the 343 km (213 mi)-long greenfield section from Kodikonda to Addanki. The technical bids were invited by the NHAI for the construction September 2022, and floated the bids for the packages in December 2022. In January 2023, of the 13 bidders that participated for the first four packages, the packages were awarded to Dilip Buildcon and Raj Path Infracon, of which Dilip Buildcon won the tenders for the first and fourth packages and Raj Path Infracon won the tenders for the second and third packages. The last tender for the last package was awarded to Megha Engineering & Infrastructures (MEIL) in February 2023. The expressway has been divided into two sections based on the region's topography–Greenfield, which includes the section from Kodikonda to Addanki, and Brownfield, which includes the existing national highway stetches till Bengaluru and Vijayawada. The lanes of the expressway will be 3.75 m (12.3 ft) wide, and its sections will consist of a 3 m (9.8 ft) paved or 2 m (6 ft 7 in) unpaved shoulder with a 19.5 m (64 ft) depressed median. It will be built using the Hybrid Annuity Model (HAM) of construction. As of March 2024, the preparatory works for the construction are ongoing, and the foundation stone for the construction has been laid by Prime Minister Narendra Modi. The full-scale work is yet to begin. The following table lists the packages, their chainages, contractors and statuses.

Packages	Chainages (Note: Distances from the origin of the expressway, i.e., Kodur (Kodikonda).)	Contractor	Status
Package-1	Kodur (0.000 km) to Vanavolu (24.300 km), Sri Sathya Sai district	Dilip Buildcon	Under construction
Package-2	Vanavolu (24.300 km) to Vankarakunta (45.700 km), Sri Sathya Sai district	Raj Path Infracon	Under construction
Package-3	Vankarakunta (45.700 km) to Odulapalle (72.000 km), Kadapa district	Raj Path Infracon	Under construction
Package-4	Odulapalle (72.000 km) to Nallacheruvupalli (96.300 km), Kadapa district	Dilip Buildcon	Under construction
Package-5	Nallacheruvupalli (96.300 km) to Yerragudipadu (129.000 km), Kadapa district	Megha Engineering & Infrastructures (MEIL)	Under construction
Package-6	Yerragudipadu (129.000 km) to Audireddipalle (160.000 km), Kadapa district	Megha Engineering & Infrastructures (MEIL)	Under Construction
Package-7	Audireddipalle (160.000 km) to Mallepalle (176.000 km), Kadapa district	Dilip Buildcon	Under Construction
Package-8	Mallepalle (176.000 km) to Kavulakuntla (196.000 km), Kadapa district	Megha Engineering & Infrastructures (MEIL)	Under Construction
Package-9	Kavulakuntla (196.000 km) to Narayanampet (203.500 km), Nellore district	Max Infra (I)–Bekem Infra Projects (JV)	Under Construction
Package-10	Narayanampet (203.500 km) to Chandrasekharapuram (228.000 km), Prakasam district	Megha Engineering & Infrastructures (MEIL)	Under Construction
Package-11	Chandrasekharapuram (228.000 km) to Polavaram (260.000 km), Prakasam district	Megha Engineering & Infrastructures (MEIL)	Under Construction
Package-12	Polavaram (260.000 km) to Marripudi (285.500 km), Prakasam district	Megha Engineering & Infrastructures (MEIL)	Under Construction
Package-13	Marripudi (285.500 km) to Somavarappadu (314.600 km), Prakasam district	KNR Constructions	Under Construction
Package-14	Somavarappadu (314.600 km) to Muppavaram (343.240 km), Prakasam district	Megha Engineering & Infrastructures (MEIL)	Under Construction

== Benefits ==
The expressway will benefit not only southern and eastern India, but also the entire country, as follows:

- Trade: As the expressway will directly connect southern India with eastern India and beyond, it will result in a high increase in transportation of goods and people, thus resulting in growth in exports, reducing dependency on imports, as well as industrial activities and accelerating economic development.
- Tourism: It will facilitate tourism by promoting it in Karnataka, Andhra Pradesh, Odisha and other parts of eastern India due to their location in the Eastern Ghats, which are well known for its environment for potentials, thus resulting in the development of local economies.
- Connectivity: The expressway will create a direct connection between eastern and southern India for the first time, resulting in faster, safer and better commute, by avoiding the existing congested route of National Highway 16 (NH-16) via Visakhapatnam, Hyderabad and Chennai, as well as reducing travel time and distance considerably, from around 13 hours to only 9 hours, and from approx. 630 km (390 mi) to 518 km (322 mi).
- Protection of the environment: To ensure the protection of green cover, trees and plants will be planted along and between the route of the expressway. There will be tunnel sections to pass through the Eastern Ghats sections of Cumbum and Nallamala Hills to safely avoid any impact on the environment.
- Employment: Due to increase in industrial activities along the expressway's route, various agricultural and industrial initiatives will help the states' as well as the nation's economy and growth. The establishment of these numerous centres will result in multiple job possibilities for thousands of people living in both the states, and will result in immense socio-economic development.

== Timeline ==
- 2021: The plan of the expressway was announced by the Government of Andhra Pradesh to the Ministry of Road Transport and Highways (MoRTH).
- August 2021: The plan of the expressway was approved by the Government of India and was included in the Bharatmala Pariyojana.
- September 2022: The initial plan of the expressway was revised when the National Highways Authority of India (NHAI) declared the expressway as National Highway 544G (NH-544G) and began to invite the technical bids for its construction.
- December 2022: The NHAI invited the bids for the main packages of the construction. Land acquisition also begins.
- January 2023: Out of 13 bidders, the first four packages of the expressway were awarded to Dilip Buildcon and Raj Path Infracon.
- February 2023: The last package was awarded to Megha Engineering & Infrastructures Limited (MEIL).
- March 2023: The preparatory works for the expressway's construction began.
- March 2024: The foundation stone for the expressway was laid by Prime Minister Narendra Modi on 11 March. Construction has begun in some sections, and is expected to be completed by 2026/27.

== See also ==
- List of national highways in India
- Ministry of Road Transport and Highways
- Expressways of India
- Bharatmala Pariyojana
- Eastern Ghats
- Transport in Karnataka
- Transport in Andhra Pradesh
- Tourism in Karnataka
- Tourism in Andhra Pradesh
