= Appalakunta =

- Village
- Interactive map of Appalakunta
- Location in Andhra Pradesh, India Appalakunta (India)
- Coordinates: 13.73°N 79.70°E
- Country: India
- State: Andhra Pradesh
- District: Sri Sathya Sai

Languages
  - Official: Telugu
- Time zone: UTC+5:30 (IST)

Appalakunta is a village in Hindupur mandal, Sri Sathya Sai district in the Indian state of Andhra Pradesh. It is served by the post office at Kirekera.
