= Gollapuram, Sri Sathya Sai district =

Gollapuram
- Village
- Interactive map of Gollapuram
- Location in Andhra Pradesh, India
- Coordinates: 13.7287°N 77.5218°E
- Country: India
- State: Andhra Pradesh
- District: Sri Sathya Sai
- Mandal: Hindupur

Area
  - Total: 12.49 km^{2} (4.82 sq mi)

Population (2011)
  - Total: 2,625
  - Density: 210.2/km^{2} (544.3/sq mi)

Languages
  - Official: Telugu
- Time zone: UTC+5:30 (IST)

Gollapuram is a village in Sri Sathya Sai district of the Indian state of Andhra Pradesh. It is located in Hindupur mandal of Penukonda revenue division.
