= Attar Chand Basha =

Indian politician

Member of Legislative Assembly, Andhra Pradesh
- In office 2014–2019
- Preceded by: Kandikunta Venkata Prasad
- Succeeded by: P. V. Sidda Reddy
- Constituency: Kadiri

Personal details
- Born: 1967 (age 58–59) Kadiri, Anantapur district, Andhra Pradesh, India
- Party: YSR Congress Party
- Other political affiliations: Telugu Desam Party
- Spouse: Parveen
- Children: 2
- Parent: Abdur Khader (father)
- Profession: Politician

Attar Chand Basha is an Indian politician from Andhra Pradesh. He was elected as a Member of the Legislative Assembly (MLA) from the Kadiri constituency in the 2014 Andhra Pradesh Legislative Assembly elections.

== Political career ==
Attar Chand Basha entered politics through the YSR Congress Party (YSRCP). In the 2014 Andhra Pradesh Legislative Assembly elections, he contested as a YSRCP candidate from Kadiri constituency and was elected as MLA for the first time.

In 2016, he switched to the Telugu Desam Party (TDP).

On 1 April 2024, during the "Memantha Siddham" bus yatra held in Kadiri, he rejoined the YSR Congress Party in the presence of party president and Chief Minister Y. S. Jagan Mohan Reddy.

== Personal life ==
Attar Chand Basha was born in 1967 at Kadiri, Anantapur district, Andhra Pradesh. He is the son of Abdur Khader. He is married to Parveen and they have three children: Aliya Anjum, Ateeq, and Adnan. The family resides at Bandu Saheb Street, Kadiri, Anantapur district.
