= Tadimarri =

- Village
- Interactive map of Tadimarri
- Location in Andhra Pradesh, India
- Coordinates: 14.5667°N 77.8667°E
- Country: India
- State: Andhra Pradesh
- District: Sri Sathya Sai
- Founder: Tirumala Naidu(Thogarakunta Doravaru)
- Talukas: Tadimarri
- Elevation: 302 m (991 ft)

Population (2001)
  - Total: 31,731

Languages
  - Official: Telugu
- Time zone: UTC+5:30 (IST)
- PIN: 515631
- Telephone code: 08559
- Vehicle registration: AP

Tadimarri is a village in Sri Sathya Sai district of the Indian state of Andhra Pradesh. It is the mandal headquarters of Tadimarri mandal in Dharmavaram revenue division.

== Geography ==
Tadimarri is located at 14.5667°N 77.8667°E. It has an average elevation of 302 metres (994 ft).

== Demographics ==
According to Indian census, 2001, the demographic details of Tadimarri mandal is as follows:

- Total Population: 31,731 in 7,329 Households
- Male Population: 16,259 and Female Population: 15,472
- Children Under 6-years of age: 3,832 (Boys – 1,985 and Girls – 1,847)
- Total Literates: 13,932
- Total Aadhaar Cards Issued ( 2014 Feb 13 ) : 26,804 out of 31,731.
