= Amadagur =

- Village
- Interactive map of Amadagur
- Location in Andhra Pradesh, India Amadagur (India)
- Coordinates: 13°53′19″N 78°01′18″E
- Country: India
- State: Andhra Pradesh
- District: Sri Sathya Sai
- Talukas: Amadagur

Population (2001)
  - Total: 26,093

Languages
  - Official: Telugu
- Time zone: UTC+5:30 (IST)
- Telephone code: 08498

Amadagur is a village in Sri Sathya Sai district of the Indian state of Andhra Pradesh. It is the headquarters of Amadagur mandal in Kadiri revenue division. According to 2011 census of India, Total Amadagur population is 29,520 people are living in this Mandal, of which 14,704 are male and 14,816 are female. Population of Amadagur in 2020 is 35,424 Literate people are 15,309 out of 9,169 are male and 6,140 are female. Total workers are 16,599 depends on multi skills out of which 8,878 are men and 7,721 are women. Total 5,032 Cultivators are depended on agriculture farming out of 3,295 are cultivated by men and 1,737 are women. 6,755 people works in agricultural land as a labour in Amadagur, men are 3,135 and 3,620 are women.
