= Yenumulapalle =

Yenumulapalli
- Census Town
- Interactive map of Yenumulapalli
- Country: India
- State: Andhra Pradesh
- District: Sri Sathya Sai

Languages
  - Official: Telugu
- Time zone: UTC+5:30 (IST)

Yenumulapalle is a census town in Sri Sathya Sai district of the Indian state of Andhra Pradesh. It is located in Puttaparthi mandal.
