= Reddipalli =

Reddypalli
- Village
- Interactive map of Reddypalli
- Location in Andhra Pradesh, India Reddypalli (India)
- Coordinates: 14°11′11″N 78°4′31″E
- Country: India
- State: Andhra Pradesh
- District: Sri Sathya Sai

Languages
  - Official: Telugu
- Time zone: UTC+5:30 (IST)

Reddypalli is a village panchayat in Nallamanda mandal of the Sri Sathya Sai district, Andhra Pradesh, India.
