= Talamarla =

- Village
- Interactive map of Talamarla
- Location in Andhra Pradesh, India Talamarla (India)
- Coordinates: 14.2142°N 77.7245°E
- Country: India
- State: Andhra Pradesh
- District: Sri Sathya Sai

Languages
  - Official: Telugu
- Time zone: UTC+5:30 (IST)
- PIN: 515133

Talamarla is a village in Sri Sathya Sai district of the Indian state of Andhra Pradesh. It is located in Kothacheruvu mandal .
