= Hindupur Assembly constituency =

Constituency of the Andhra Pradesh Legislative Assembly, India

Coordinates: 13.82°N 77.50°E

Hindupur
- Constituency No. 157 for the Andhra Pradesh Legislative Assembly
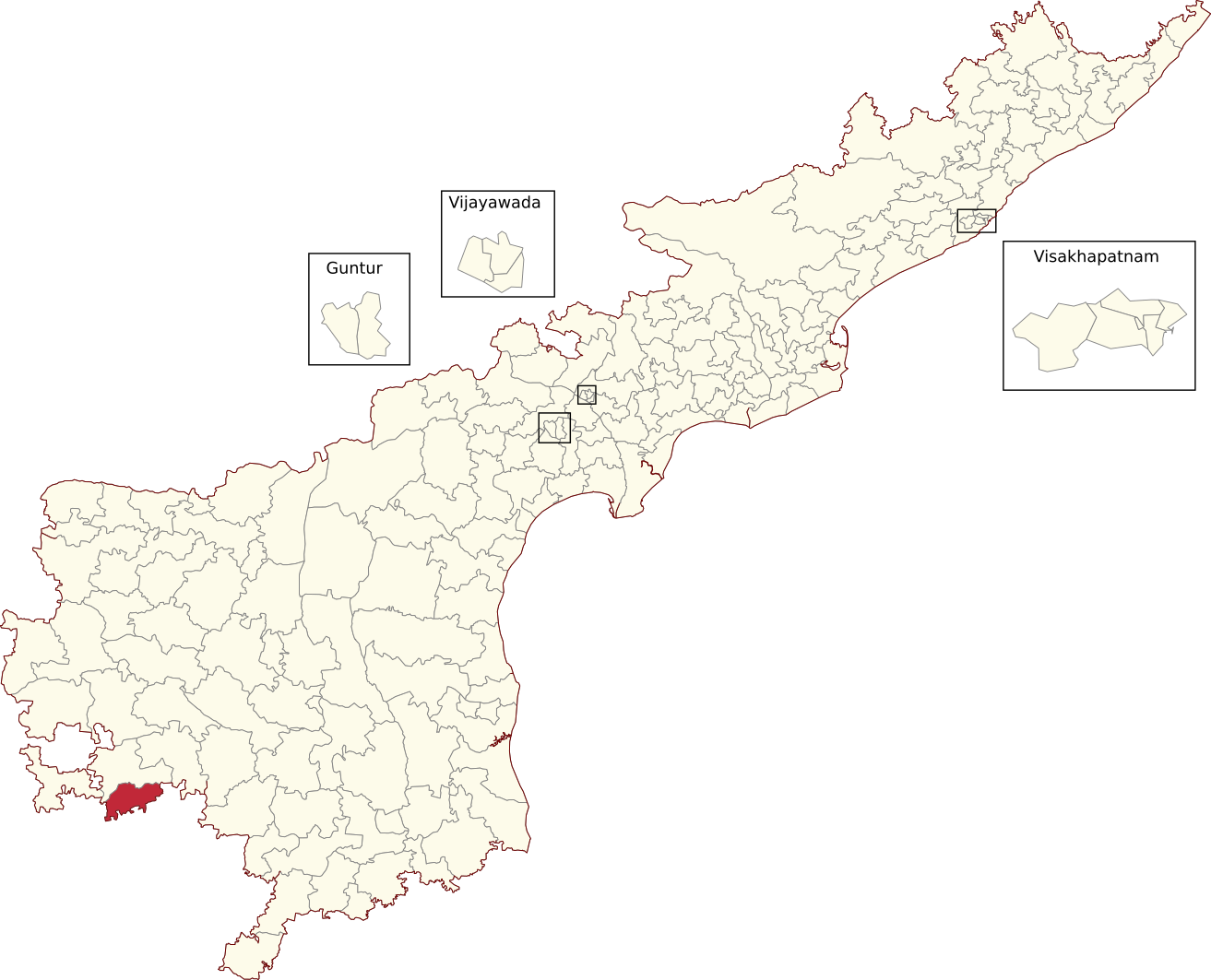
- Location of Hindupur Assembly constituency within Andhra Pradesh

Constituency details
- Country: India
- Region: South India
- State: Andhra Pradesh
- District: Sri Sathya Sai
- Lok Sabha constituency: Hindupur
- Established: 1951
- Total electors: 208,327
- Reservation: None

Member of Legislative Assembly
- 16th Andhra Pradesh Legislative Assembly
- Incumbent Nandamuri Balakrishna
- Party: TDP
- Alliance: NDA
- Elected year: 2024
- Preceded by: P. Abdul Ghani; TDP

Hindupur Assembly constituency is a constituency in Sri Sathya Sai District of Andhra Pradesh that elects representatives to the Andhra Pradesh Legislative Assembly in India. It is one of the seven assembly segments of Hindupur Lok Sabha constituency.

Most Successful parties from Hindupur Assembly Constituency
1. INC (7 Times) (39.0%)
2. TDP (11 Times) (61.0%)

Nandamuri Balakrishna is the current MLA of the constituency, having won the 2024 Andhra Pradesh Legislative Assembly election from Telugu Desam Party. As of 2019, there are a total of 208,327 electors in the constituency. The constituency was established in 1951, as per the Delimitation Orders (1951).

== Mandals ==
Mandal
Hindupur
Lepakshi
Chilamathur

Mandals in Hindupuram Assembly Constituency

== Members of the Legislative Assembly ==
Year	Member	Political party
1952	Sivasankara Reddy	Indian National Congress
1955	Kallur Subbarao	Indian National Congress
1962	K. Ramakrishna Reddy	Independent
1965^	Kallur Subbarao	Indian National Congress
1967	A. Katnagante	Independent
1972	G. Somasekhar	Indian National Congress
1978	K. Thippeswamy	Indian National Congress (I)
1983	Pamishetty Ranganayakulu	Telugu Desam Party
1985	N. T. Rama Rao	Telugu Desam Party
1989	N. T. Rama Rao	Telugu Desam Party
1994	N. T. Rama Rao	Telugu Desam Party
1996^	Nandamuri Harikrishna	Telugu Desam Party
1999	C. C. Venkataramudu	Telugu Desam Party
2004	Pamisetty Ranganayakulu	Telugu Desam Party
2009	P. Abdul Ghani	Telugu Desam Party
2014	Nandamuri Balakrishna	Telugu Desam Party
2019	Nandamuri Balakrishna	Telugu Desam Party
2024	Nandamuri Balakrishna	Telugu Desam Party

== Election results ==
=== 2024 ===
2024 Andhra Pradesh Legislative Assembly election: Hindupur
Party	Candidate	Votes	%	±%
TDP	Nandamuri Balakrishna	107,250	54.73	
YSRCP	Tippegowda Narayan Deepika	74,653	38.10	
INC	Mohammad Hussain Inayathulla	8,958	4.57	
IND	Paripoornananda Swami	1,512	0.77	
Majority		32,597	16.63	
Turnout		1,95,961		
TDP hold		Swing		

=== 2019 ===
2019 Andhra Pradesh Legislative Assembly election: Hindupur
Party	Candidate	Votes	%	±%
TDP	Nandamuri Balakrishna	90,704	51.47	
YSRCP	Shaik Mohammed Iqbal	72,676	41.91	
JSP	Aakula Umesh	7,305	2.42	
NOTA	None of the Above	1,290	0.72	
Majority		18,028	9.55	
Turnout		1,78,167		
TDP hold		Swing		

=== 2014 ===
2014 Andhra Pradesh Legislative Assembly election: Hindupur
Party	Candidate	Votes	%	±%
TDP	Nandamuri Balakrishna	81,543	51.12	
YSRCP	B. Naveen Nischal	65,347	40.97	
INC	M. H. Enayathulla	8,435	5.29	
AIMIM	Mohammad Ilias	957	0.60	
NOTA	None of the Above	785	0.49	
Majority		16,196	10.15	
Turnout		1,59,506	76.57	
TDP hold		Swing		

=== 2009 ===
2009 Andhra Pradesh Legislative Assembly election: Hindupur
Party	Candidate	Votes	%	±%
TDP	P. Abdul Ghani	45,506	31.69	−18.97
IND	B. Naveen Nischal	36,742	25.57	
INC	A. Lakshmi Narayana	30,769	21.42	−23.76
PRP	Palla Lakshmi Narayana	18,713	13.03	
Majority		8,746	6.11	
Turnout		143,664	69.63	−1.65
TDP hold		Swing		

=== 2004 ===
2004 Andhra Pradesh Legislative Assembly election: Hindupur
Party	Candidate	Votes	%	±%
TDP	P. Ranganayakulu	68,108	50.65	−14.50
INC	B. Naveen Nischal	60,745	45.18	+11.46
Majority		7,363	5.47	
Turnout		134,458	71.28	+2.65
TDP hold		Swing		

=== 1952 ===
1952 Madras State Legislative Assembly election: Hindupur
Party	Candidate	Votes	%	±%
INC	Sivasankara Reddy	13,868	34.09	34.09
KMPP	Sreenivasa Reddy	12,686	31.18	
IND	Venkataseshiah	12,123	29.80	
IND	Seshagiri Rao	1,135	2.79	
	Venkataswamy	872	2.14	
Margin of victory		1,182	2.91	
Turnout		40,684	56.03	
Registered electors		72,606		
INC win (new seat)				

== See also ==
- List of constituencies of Andhra Pradesh Legislative Assembly
