= Tanakal =

- Village
- Interactive map of Tanakal
- Location in Andhra Pradesh, India
- Coordinates: 13.92°N 78.18°E
- Country: India
- State: Andhra Pradesh
- District: Sri Sathya Sai
- Talukas: Tanakal

Languages
  - Official: Telugu
- Time zone: UTC+5:30 (IST)
- PIN: 515571
- Telephone code: 08498
- Vehicle registration: AP

Tanakal is a village in Sri Sathya Sai district of the Indian state of Andhra Pradesh. It is the headquarters of Tanakal mandal in Kadiri revenue division.
