= Kadiri Assembly constituency =

Constituency of the Andhra Pradesh Legislative Assembly, India

Coordinates: 14.11°N 78.16°E

Kadiri
- Constituency No. 161 for the Andhra Pradesh Legislative Assembly
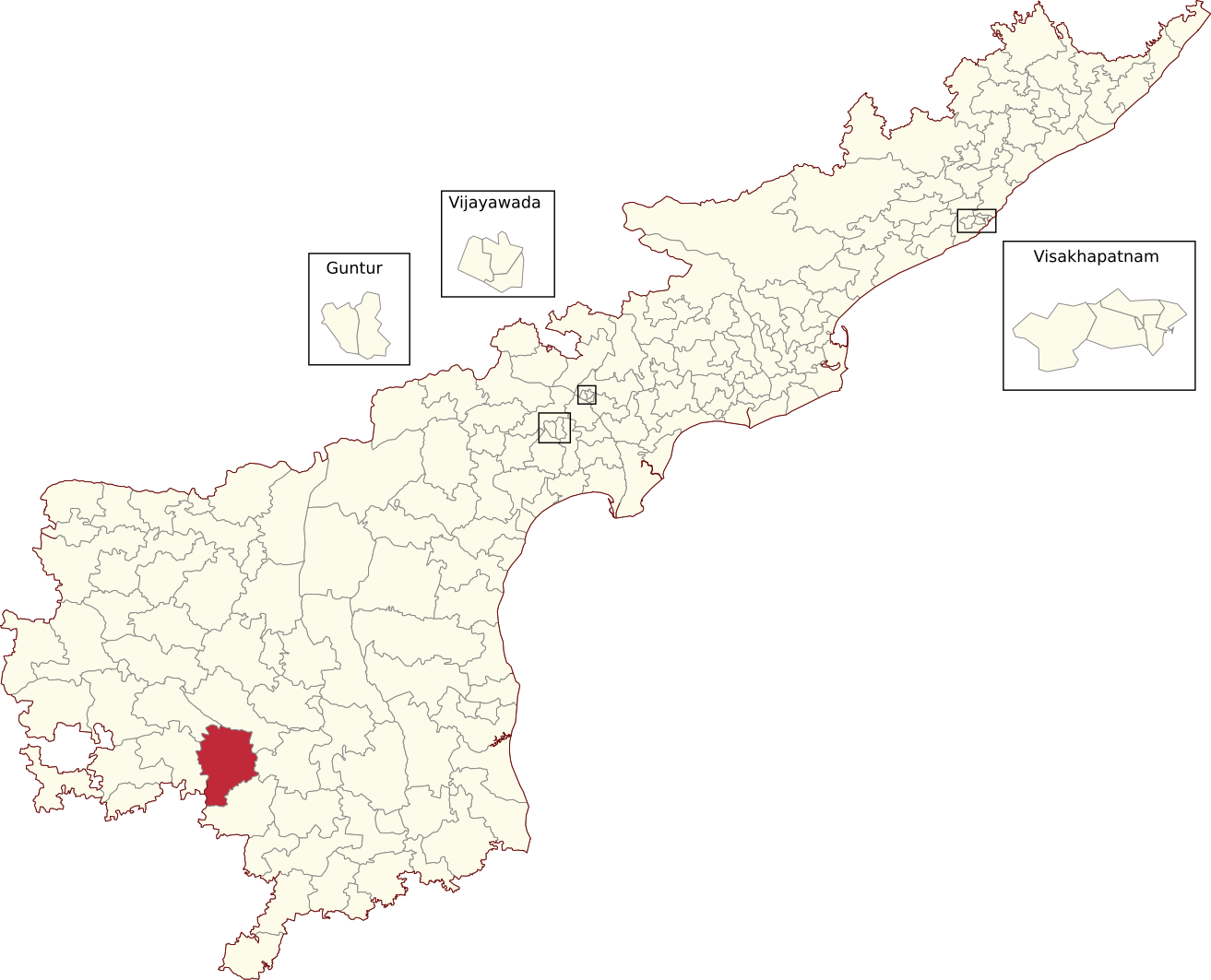
- Location of Kadiri Assembly constituency within Andhra Pradesh

Constituency details
- Country: India
- Region: South India
- State: Andhra Pradesh
- District: Sri Sathya Sai
- Lok Sabha constituency: Hindupur
- Established: 1951
- Total electors: 239,867
- Reservation: None

Member of Legislative Assembly
- 16th Andhra Pradesh Legislative Assembly
- Incumbent Kandikunta Venkata Prasad
- Party: TDP
- Alliance: NDA
- Elected year: 2024

Kadiri Assembly constituency is a constituency in Sri Sathya Sai district of Andhra Pradesh that elects representatives to the Andhra Pradesh Legislative Assembly in India. It is one of seven assembly segments of Hindupur Lok Sabha constituency.

Kandikunta Venkata Prasad is the current MLA of the constituency, having won the 2024 Andhra Pradesh Legislative Assembly election from Telugu Desam Party. As of 2019, there are a total of 239,867 electors in the constituency. The constituency was established in 1951, as per the Delimitation Orders (1951).

== Mandals ==
Mandal
Tanakallu
Nambulapulakunta
Gandlapenta
Kadiri
Nallacheruvu
Talupula

Mandals in Kadiri Assembly Constituency

== Members of the Legislative Assembly ==
| Year | Member | Political party |
|---|---|---|
| 1952 | K. V. Vema Reddy | Indian National Congress |
| 1955 | K. V. Vema Reddy | Indian National Congress |
| 1962 | E. Gopalu Naik | Indian National Congress |
| 1967 | K. V. Vema Reddy | Indian National Congress |
| 1972 | C. Narayana Reddy | Independent |
| 1978 | Nawab Mayana Nizam Vali | Indian National Congress |
| 1983 | Mohammed Shakir | Telugu Desam Party |
| 1985 | Chennur Abdul Rasool | Telugu Desam Party |
| 1989 | Mohammed Shakir | Indian National Congress |
| 1994 | Jonna Suryanarayana | Telugu Desam Party |
| 1999 | M.S. Partha Sarathi | Bharatiya Janata Party |
| 2004 | Jonna Ramaiah | Indian National Congress |
| 2009 | Kandikunta Venkata Prasad | Telugu Desam Party |
| 2014 | Attar Chand Basha | YSR Congress Party |
| 2019 | P. V. Sidda Reddy | YSR Congress Party |
| 2024 | Kandikunta Venkata Prasad | Telugu Desam Party |

== Election results ==
=== 1952 ===
1952 Madras Legislative Assembly election: Kadiri
| Party | Candidate | Votes | % | ±% |
|---|---|---|---|---|
| INC | K. V. Vema Reddi | 19,696 | 48.18% | 48.18% |
| Independent | Y. Papireddi | 14,421 | 35.28% | |
| IUML | C. Mahamed Ali | 4,596 | 11.24% | |
| KLP | D. Venkatsiva Reddi | 2,167 | 5.30% | |
| Margin of victory | | 5,275 | 12.90% | |
| Turnout | | 40,880 | 56.10% | |
| Registered electors | | 72,868 | | |
| INC win (new seat) | | | | |

=== 2004 ===
2004 Andhra Pradesh Legislative Assembly election: Kadiri
| Party | Candidate | Votes | % | ±% |
|---|---|---|---|---|
| INC | Jonna Ramaiah | 48,104 | 41.26 | |
| Independent | Kandikunta Venkata Prasad | 39,166 | 33.59 | |
| Majority | | 8,938 | 7.67 | |
| Turnout | | 116,595 | 65.52 | +7.28 |
| INC gain from BJP | | Swing | | |

=== 2009 ===
2009 Andhra Pradesh Legislative Assembly election: Kadiri
| Party | Candidate | Votes | % | ±% |
|---|---|---|---|---|
| TDP | Kandikunta Venkata Prasad | 72,308 | 46.67 | |
| INC | Battala Venkataramana | 57,331 | 37.00 | |
| PRP | P. V. Sidda Reddy | 18,177 | 11.73 | |
| Majority | | 14,977 | 9.67 | |
| Turnout | | 154,935 | 66.56 | +1.04 |
| TDP gain from INC | | Swing | | |

=== 2014 ===
2014 Andhra Pradesh Legislative Assembly election: Kadiri
| Party | Candidate | Votes | % | ±% |
|---|---|---|---|---|
| YSRCP | Attar Chand Basha | 81,639 | 48.30 | |
| TDP | Kandikunta Venkata Prasad | 80,671 | 47.73 | |
| Majority | | 968 | 0.57 | |
| Turnout | | 169,010 | 75.68 | +9.08 |
| YSRCP gain from TDP | | Swing | | |

=== 2019 ===
2019 Andhra Pradesh Legislative Assembly election: Kadiri
| Party | Candidate | Votes | % | ±% |
|---|---|---|---|---|
| YSRCP | P. V. Sidda Reddy | 102,432 | 53.92 | |
| TDP | Kandikunta Venkata Prasad | 75,189 | 39.58 | |
| Majority | | 27,243 | 10.57 | |
| Turnout | | 1,89,980 | 78.68 | +3.00 |
| YSRCP hold | | Swing | | |

=== 2024 ===
2024 Andhra Pradesh Legislative Assembly election: Kadiri
| Party | Candidate | Votes | % | ±% |
|---|---|---|---|---|
| TDP | Kandikunta Venkata Prasad | 103,610 | 49.54 | |
| YSRCP | BS Maqbool Ahmed | 97,345 | 46.54 | |
| Majority | | 6,265 | 3.00 | |
| Turnout | | 209,152 | 1 | +1 |
| TDP gain from YSRCP | | Swing | | |

== See also ==
- List of constituencies of Andhra Pradesh Legislative Assembly
