= Nallacheruvu =

- Village
- Interactive map of Nallacheruvu
- Location in Andhra Pradesh, India
- Coordinates: 14°00′N 78°12′E
- Country: India
- State: Andhra Pradesh
- District: Sri Sathya Sai
- Talukas: Nallacheruvu

Languages
  - Official: Telugu
- Time zone: UTC+5:30 (IST)

Nallacheruvu is a village in Sri Sathya Sai district of the Indian state of Andhra Pradesh. It is the headquarters of Nallacheruvu mandal in Kadiri revenue division.
