= Agali mandal =

- Mandal
- Interactive map of Agali mandal
- Location in Andhra Pradesh, India Agali mandal (India)
- Coordinates: 13°47′03″N 77°03′16″E
- Country: India
- State: Andhra Pradesh
- District: Sri Sathya Sai

Population (2011)
  - Total: 36,253

Languages
  - Official: Telugu
- Time zone: UTC+5:30 (IST)
- PIN: 515311
- Telephone code: 08493
- Vehicle registration: AP

Agali mandal is a mandal in Sri Sathya Sai district of Andhra Pradesh, India. It is part of Madakasira revenue division w.e.f 31 Dec 2025. It is about 151 kilometers from Anantapur town and bordered by Karnataka state and Rolla mandal of Sri Sathya Sai district.

== Towns and villages ==
Agali is the most populated village and Hulikeradevarahalli is the least populated settlement in the mandal. As of the 2011 Census of India, the mandal has 8 settlements, that includes the following: Agali, Hulikeradevarahalli, Inagalore, Kodihalli, Madhudi, Narasambudi, P.Byadigera, Ravudi and Ragelinganahalli.

== Sources ==
- Census India 2011 (sub districts)
- Revenue Department of AP
