= Gandlapenta =

- Village
- Interactive map of Gandlapenta
- Location in Andhra Pradesh, India
- Coordinates: 14°03′00″N 78°18′32″E
- Country: India
- State: Andhra Pradesh
- District: Sri Sathya Sai
- Talukas: Gandlapenta

Languages
  - Official: Telugu
- Time zone: UTC+5:30 (IST)
- Vehicle registration: AP

Gandlapenta is a village in Sri Sathya Sai district of the Indian state of Andhra Pradesh. It is the headquarters of Gandlapenta mandal in Kadiri revenue division.
