= Kanaganapalle =

- Village
- Interactive map of Kanaganapalle
- Location in Andhra Pradesh, India Kanaganapalle (India)
- Coordinates: 14.4500°N 77.5167°E
- Country: India
- State: Andhra Pradesh
- District: Sri Sathya Sai
- Talukas: Kanaganapalle
- Elevation: 426 m (1,398 ft)

Population (2011)
  - Total: 6,965

Languages
  - Official: Telugu
- Time zone: UTC+5:30 (IST)
- Postal code: 515641
- Vehicle registration: AP

Kanaganapalle is a village in the Sri Sathya Sai district of Andhra Pradesh. It is the headquarters of a Dharmavaram revenue division mandal.

== Geography ==
Kanaganapalle or Kanaganapally is located at 14.4500°N 77.5167°E. It has an average elevation of 426 metres (1400 ft).

=== Villages ===
- Ramapuram

== Demographics ==
As of the 2011 census, Kanaganapalle had a population of 6,965. The total population constitutes 3,647 males and 3,318 females, or a sex ratio of 910 females per 1000 males. 712 children are in the age group of 0–6 years, of which 371 are boys and 341 are girls: a ratio of 919 per 1000. The average literacy rate stands at 60.05% with 3,755 literate people.
