= Kandikunta Venkata Prasad =

Indian politician (born 1967)

Member of Legislative Assembly Andhra Pradesh
- Incumbent
- Assumed office 2024
- Preceded by: P. V. Sidda Reddy
- Constituency: Kadiri

Personal details
- Born: 1971 (age 54–55)
- Party: Telugu Desam Party

Kandikunta Venkata Prasad (born 1967) is an Indian politician from Andhra Pradesh who is an MLA from Kadiri Assembly constituency in Sri Sathya Sai district. He represents Telugu Desam Party. He won the 2024 Andhra Pradesh Legislative Assembly election where TDP had an alliance with BJP and Jana Sena Party.

== Early life and education ==
Prasad is from Rayachoti Road, Kadiri. His father is Kandikunta Raguramappa. He married Kandikunta Yashoda Devi. He completed school at Government Boys High School in 1980, Nandikotkur, Kurnool district. He did intermediate education in 1982 at Government Junior College, Kadiri in the former Anantapur district. He did his B.Tech. from 1983 to 1987 at Bapuji Institute of Engineering and Technology, Davanagere, Karnataka. He is from Thogata Veera Kshatriya caste.

== Political career ==
Prasad became an MLA for the second time winning the 2024 Andhra Pradesh Legislative Assembly election from Kadiri Assembly constituency representing Telugu Desam Party. He polled 103,610 votes and defeated his nearest rival B. S. Maqbool Ahmed of YSR Congress Party by a narrow margin of 6,265 votes. Earlier, he won the 2009 Andhra Pradesh Legislative Assembly election from Kadiri on TDP seat by defeating Battala Venkataramana by a margin of 14,977 votes. In between, he lost to YSR Congress Party candidates in both the 2014 and 2019 Assembly elections. He lost the 2014 Andhra Pradesh Legislative Assembly election to Attar Chand Basha by a narrow margin of 968 votes while he lost to P. V. Sidda Reddy in the 2019 Andhra Pradesh Legislative Assembly election by a margin of 27,243 votes due to the wave in favour of YSR Congress Party.
