= Ramapuram, Kanaganapalli =

Rampuram
- Village
- Interactive map of Rampuram
- Location in Andhra Pradesh, India
- Coordinates: 14.479075°N 77.522823°E
- Country: India
- State: Andhra Pradesh
- District: Sri Sathya Sai
- Established: 1800 BC – 50 AD
- Named for: Lord Rama

Area
  - Total: 5 km^{2} (1.9 sq mi)
- Elevation: 516 m (1,693 ft)

Population
  - Total: 650
  - Density: 600/km^{2} (1,600/sq mi)

Languages
  - Official: Telugu, English
- Time zone: UTC+5:30 (IST)
- PIN: 515641
- Telephone code: 08554
- Vehicle registration: AP 02

Rampuram is a village of the Kanaganapalle mandal in Sri Sathya Sai district of the Indian state of Andhra Pradesh.

== Etymology ==
As the village is built around the Temple of Lord Gosaramudu (గోసారాముడు గుడి), the village got the name of Rampuram,

== History ==
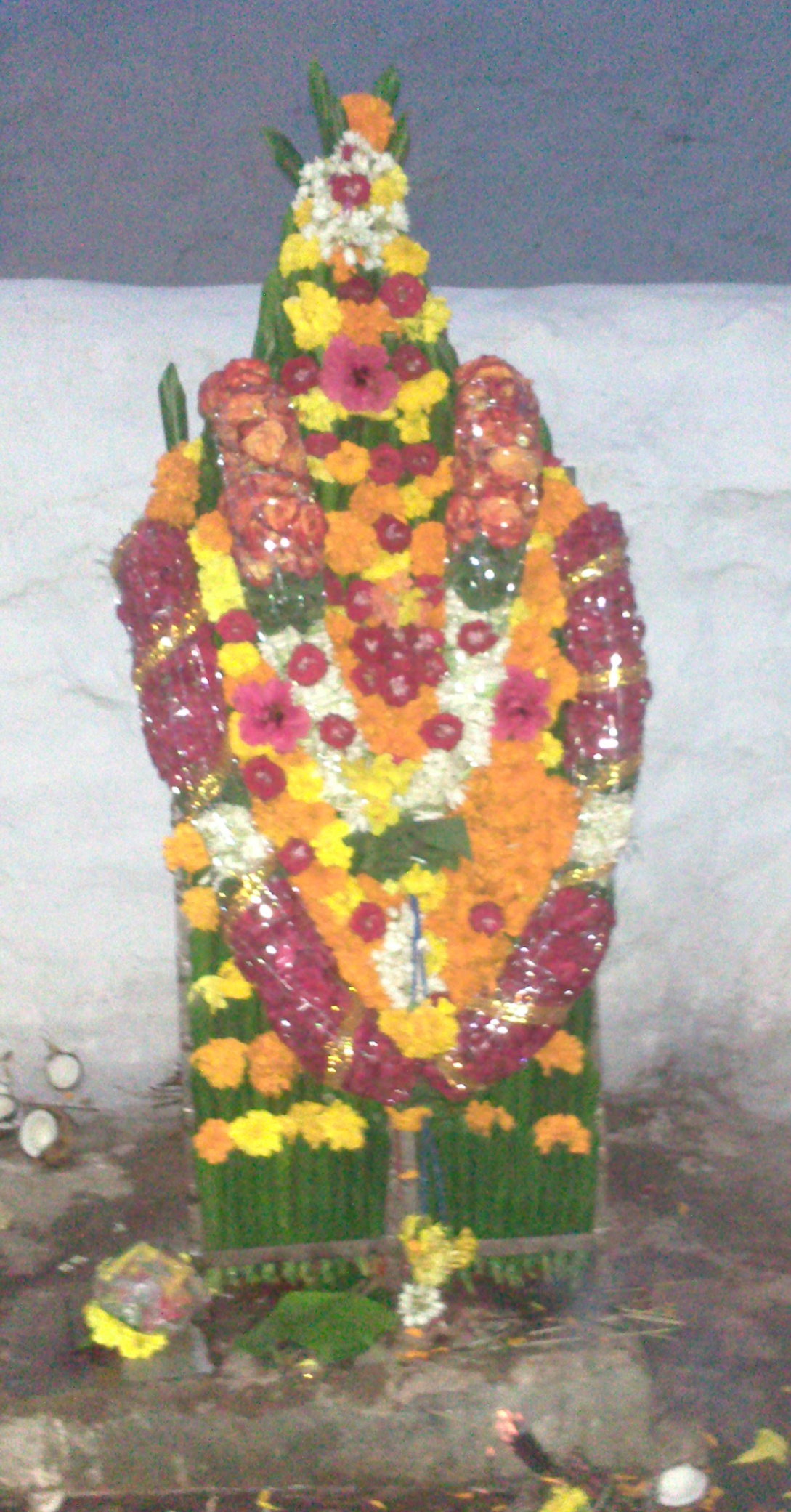
Lord Gosaramudu swamy (గోసారాముడు గుడి)

There is no documented proof of when the village is established, but the geographical location of the village explains that around 150–200 years back some shepherds settled on the bank of small river(Pandameru vaagu-which passes raptadu lake and reaches Sri Sathya Sai cheruvu) and built the village around the temple of lord Gosaramudu (గోసారాముడు గుడి).

There is also the Temple of Hanuman (ఆ౦జనేయసామి గుడి) on the outskirts of the village as the symbol of protecting the village from evil and demons, but as the time passed the village expanded.
