= Talupula =

- village
- Interactive map of Talupula
- Location in Andhra Pradesh, India
- Coordinates: 14.2500°N 78.2667°E
- Country: India
- State: Andhra Pradesh
- District: Sri Sathya Sai
- Talukas: Talupula
- Elevation: 382 m (1,253 ft)

Languages
  - Official: Telugu
- Time zone: UTC+5:30 (IST)
- PIN: 515581
- Vehicle registration: AP

Talupula is a village in Sri Sathya Sai district of the Indian state of Andhra Pradesh. It is the headquarters of Talupula mandal in Kadiri revenue division.

== Geography ==
Talupula is located at 14.2500°N 78.2667°E. It has an average elevation of 382 metres (1256 ft).

== Demography ==
The mandal of Talupula has a surface area of 280.3 km^{2} (69,234 acres) and a population of 42,019 (2001 census). Dalits constitute 10% of the population, and tribes 6%. The gender ratio is 959. The literacy rate of the mandal is 51%. Among them, males make up 67%, while females make up 35%. The working class consists of 45% agricultural labour, 1% industrial workers, and unorganised workers at 16%. School children are 6159 (661 for every 1 lakh of population), and the teacher-student ratio is 1:23. Junior college students number at 278. For every 1 lakh of population, there only 4 doctors to look after the health of the people. There are 10 beds for every 10,000 people in the government general dispensary.
