= Obuladevaracheruvu =

ODYSSEY
- Small town
- Interactive map of ODYSSEY
- Location in Andhra Pradesh, India
- Country: India
- State: Andhra Pradesh
- District: Sri Sathya Sai
- Mandal: Obuladevarecheruvu

Languages
  - Official: Telugu
- Time zone: UTC+5:30 (IST)
- Vehicle registration: AP

Obuladevaracheruvu is a village in Sri Sathya Sai district of the Indian state of Andhra Pradesh. It is the headquarters of Obuladevaracheruvu mandal in Puttaparthi revenue division.
