= Penukonda revenue division =

- revenue division in Sri Sathya Sai district
- Country: India
- State: Andhra Pradesh
- District: Sri Sathya Sai
- Headquarters: Penukonda
- Time zone: UTC+05:30 (IST)

Penukonda revenue division (or Penukonda division) is an administrative division in the Sri Sathya Sai district of the Indian state of Andhra Pradesh. It is one of the 5 revenue divisions in the district with 8 mandals under its administration. The divisional headquarters is located at Penukonda.

== Administration ==
There are 8 mandals administered under Penukonda revenue division.

1. Chilamathur
2. Gorantla
3. Hindupur
4. Lepakshi
5. Parigi
6. Penukonda
7. Roddam
8. Somandepalle

== See also ==
- List of revenue divisions in Andhra Pradesh
