= Mastan vali =

Hazrat Mastan Vali
- Born: Unknown; Unknown
- Died: 18 October 1905; Kothacheruvu, Anantapur district,Madras Presidency British India
- Resting place: Dargah: Kothacheruvu (Interred); Mutt: Kothacheruvu (Relics)
- Venerated in: Sufism, Syncretism
- Major shrine: Hazrat Mastan Vali Dargah, Bukkapatnam Road
- Feast: 18th Shaban (Annual Urs)
- Influences: Suhrawardiyya, Qalandariyya

Hazrat Mastan Vali (also recorded in colonial records as Masthan Ali Fakir; died 18 October 1905) was a 19th-century Indian Sufi saint and ascetic (Majzub) based in Kothacheruvu, Anantapur district, Andhra Pradesh.

Revered for his extreme renunciation and spiritual absorption, his legacy is a notable example of syncretism in the Deccan. He is venerated through a unique "dual-shrine" tradition: regarded as a Muslim saint (Wali) at his Dargah, and simultaneously as a divine guru at a separate Mutt (monastery) maintained by tribal devotees.

== Life and spiritual state ==
Little is recorded regarding Mastan Vali's parentage or place of birth. According to the Madras District Gazetteers (1905), he appeared in the Kothacheruvu region around the 1850s.

His spiritual comportment aligned with the Qalandariyya tradition, characterized by a rejection of material norms and social conventions. He spent his early years in seclusion (Uzlat), inhabiting forests, mountains, and burial grounds surrounding the village, often wandering without clothing and subsisting on wild roots and leaves. He maintained a lifelong vow of absolute silence (Samt).

Over time, the local populace recognized his behavior not as madness, but as a state of Jazb (divine absorption). His presence became associated with the well-being of the agrarian community; his acceptance of food offerings was interpreted as a benevolent omen, while refusal was seen as a warning of misfortune.

== Miracles (Karamat) ==
The Saint's authority was established through Karamat (miracles), often associated with the protection of the village from natural elements.

=== 1903 flood ===
The most significantly documented event in his life occurred during the northeast monsoon of 1903. Heavy rains caused the Bukkapatnam Tank—one of the largest irrigation tanks in the district—to reach critical levels ("surplus"). The villagers of Kothacheruvu feared the tank bund would breach, which would have devastated the village.

According to district records, the Saint walked to the "surplus weir" (the overflow point) and lay down near the rising waters. The floodwaters subsequently receded without breaching the bund, an event the local population attributed to his spiritual intercession.

== Syncretic legacy ==
Hazrat Mastan Vali died on 18 October 1905 (18th Shaban 1323 AH). His death precipitated a dispute between his Muslim followers and his Hindu/Tribal disciples regarding his burial, leading to a compromise that resulted in two distinct shrines.

=== Dargah ===
The Muslim community took possession of the Saint's body, which was interred in a Dargah located to the south of the village on Bukkapatnam Road.

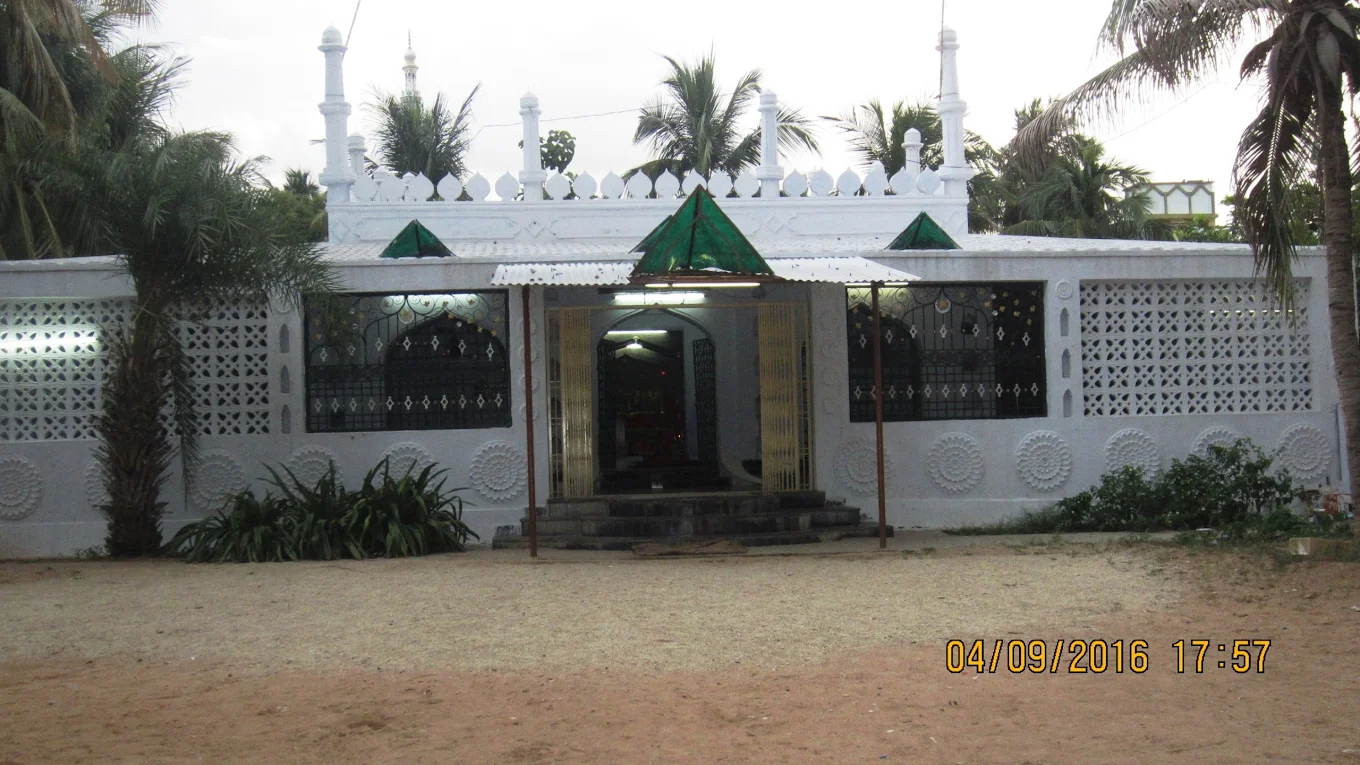
Dargah

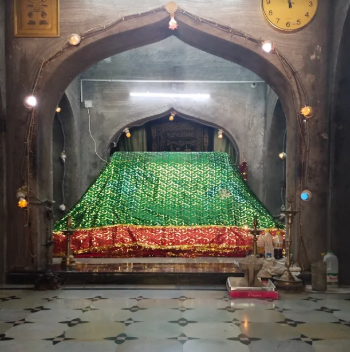
Mazar (tomb)

- Rituals: The site follows Islamic customs. The annual Urs (death anniversary) is observed on the 18th of Shaban.
- Endowment: Historically, the Dargah was supported by five acres of Inam (tax-free) land granted to support the feeding of pilgrims during the festival.

=== Mutt ===
The Saint's closest disciple was a man named Honnappa from the Koracha tribal community. Following the compromise, Honnappa established a separate Mutt (monastery) dedicated to the Saint.

- Relics: As the body was at the Dargah, the Mutt enshrined the Saint's relics—specifically his matted hair and nail parings—which he had shed during his life of penance.
- Tradition: Honnappa's descendants act as the custodians. They traditionally dress as Dasaries (Vaishnavite wandering minstrels) and perform special Poojas on Saturdays, effectively integrating the Sufi saint into the local devotional pantheon.

== Modern development ==
In the late 20th century, the Dargah administration undertook infrastructure projects to ensure financial self-sufficiency and better amenities for pilgrims.

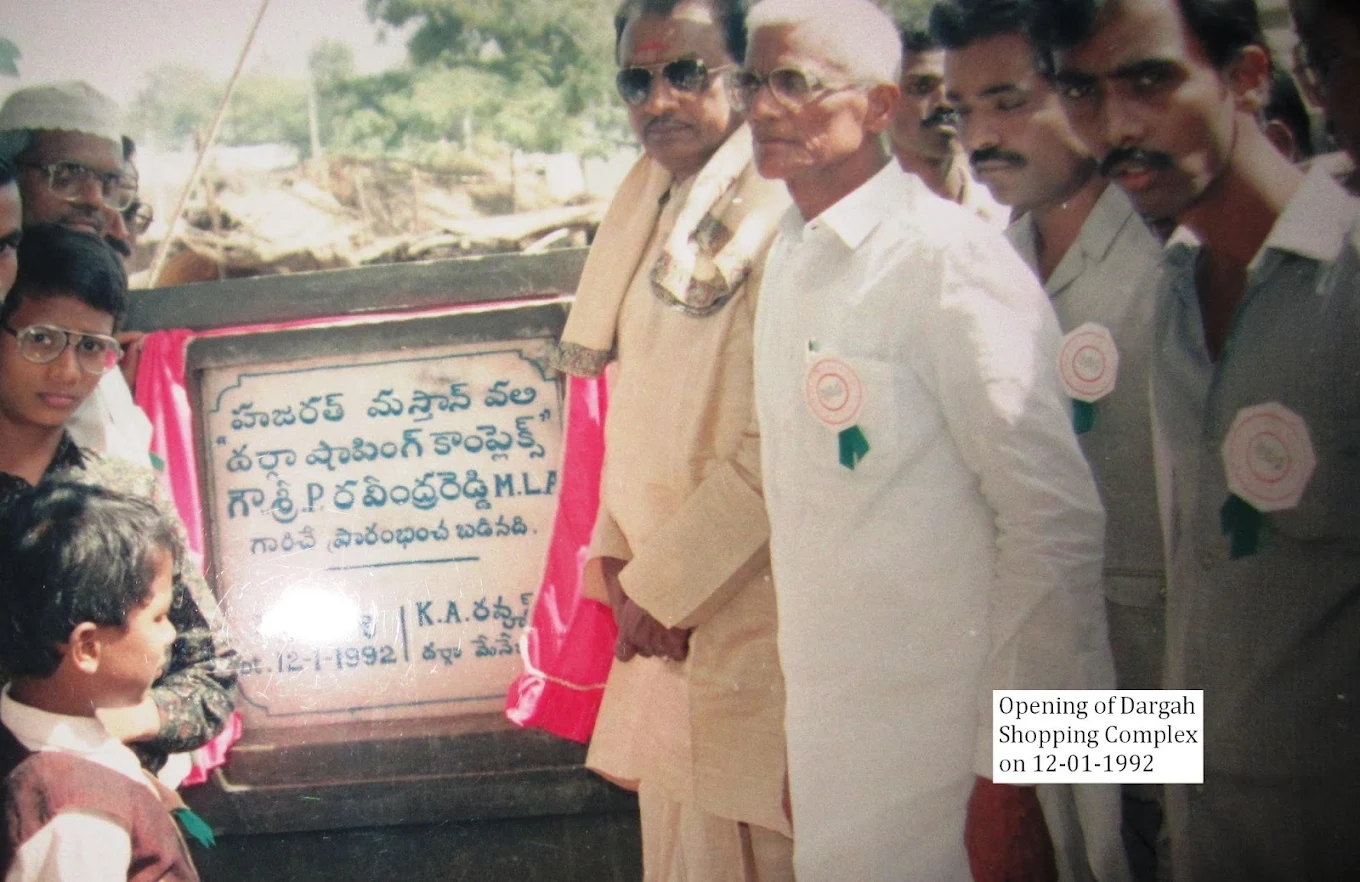
Inauguration of Hazrat Mastan Vali Dargah Complex

On 12 January 1992, a dedicated shopping complex for the Dargah was inaugurated. The opening ceremony was officiated by P. Ravindra Reddy (the then-Member of the Legislative Assembly for Gorantla) and K.A. Ravoof, who served as the Mutavalli (custodian) and Dargah Manager at the time.

== See also ==
- Sufi Saints of South Asia
- Baba_Fakruddin
- Penukonda
