= Appalavandla palli =

Appalavandla Palli
- Village
- Country: India
- State: Andhra Pradesh
- District: Sri Sathya Sai
- Founder: Viswanath Reddy

Population (2021)
  - Total: 521

Languages
  - Official: Telugu
- Time zone: UTC+5:30 (IST)
- PIN: 515110
- Telephone code: 08555
- Website: https://www. facebook. com/appalavandlapalli

Appalavandla palli is a hamlet in Bandlapalle panchayath of Kothacheruvu mandal in Sri Sathya Sai district of the Indian state of Andhra Pradesh. Also very reachable to Penukonda, Puttaparthi, Dharmavaram, Kothacheruvu, Hindupur and Bangalore
