= Kurubavandla palli =

- Village
- Country: India
- State: Andhra Pradesh
- District: Sri Sathya Sai

Languages
  - Official: Telugu
- Time zone: UTC+5:30 (IST)
- Vehicle registration: AP

Kurubavandla palli is a village in Penukonda mandal, Sri Sathya Sai district, Andhra Pradesh (state), India.
