= Madakasira revenue division =

Revenue division in Sri Sathya Sai district, Andhra Pradesh, India

- revenue division
- Country: India
- State: Andhra Pradesh
- District: Sri Sathya Sai
- Formed: 31 December 2025
- Founder: Government of Andhra Pradesh
- Headquarters: Madakasira
- Time zone: UTC+05:30 (IST)

Madakasira revenue division is an administrative division in the Sri Sathya Sai district of the Indian state of Andhra Pradesh. It is one of the five revenue divisions in the district and comprises five mandals. The division was formed on 31 December 2025 as part of the district consolidation and administrative reorganisation undertaken by the Government of Andhra Pradesh during the 2025 restructuring of districts.

There are 5 mandals administered under Madakasira revenue division.

1. Agali
2. Amarapuram
3. Gudibanda
4. Madakasira
5. Rolla

== See also ==
- List of revenue divisions in Andhra Pradesh
