= Chandravadana and Mohiyar =

Figures in Indian mythology

In local legend, Chandravadana and Mohiyar were a pair of lovers from the town of Kadiri, Andhra Pradesh, India. According to the legend, Chandravadana was a local Hindu and Mohiyar was a traveling Muslim; their union involved supernatural events, which proved that it was blessed by God. This story is thought to explain the peaceful coexistence of the large populations of Hindus and Muslims in the town today.
