= K. Thippeswamy =

Indian politician (died 2021)

Member of Legislative Assembly
- In office 1978–1983
- Preceded by: G.Somasekhar
- Succeeded by: P.Ranganayakulu
- Constituency: Hindupur

Personal details
- Born: 1940 or 1941 Hindupur, Andhra Pradesh
- Died: 11 April 2021 (aged 80)
- Party: Indian National Congress
- Children: K.T.Sreedhar

Kamaganahally Thippeswamy (1940/1 – 11 April 2021) was an Indian politician from Andhra Pradesh. He was a leader of Indian National Congress. He was once an MLA from Hindupur assembly constituency.

== Career ==
In 1978, he contested as INC(I) candidate from Hindupur, won as MLA defeating K Nagabhushan Reddy of Janata Party. In 1983 he lost to P Ranganayakulu of Telugu Desam Party.
