= Chilamathur =

- Village
- Interactive map of Chilamathur
- Location in Andhra Pradesh, India
- Coordinates: 13°50′22″N 77°42′14″E
- Country: India
- State: Andhra Pradesh
- District: Sri Sathya Sai
- Talukas: Chilamathur

Population (2011)
  - Total: 15,449

Languages
  - Official: Telugu
- Time zone: UTC+5:30 (IST)
- PIN: 515341
- Telephone code: +91–8556
- Vehicle registration: AP

Chilamathur is a village in Sri Sathya Sai district of Andhra Pradesh in India.

== Demographics ==
As of 2011 census, the village had a population of 15,449. The total population constitutes 7,786 males and 7,663 females —a sex ratio of 984 females per 1000 males. 1,706 children are in the age group of 0–6 years, of which 852 are boys and 854 are girls —a ratio of 1002 per 1000. The average literacy rate stands at 67.37% with 9,258 literates, significantly higher than the state average of 67.41%.
