= Kothacheruvu =

Coordinates: 14°11′19″N 77°45′57″E

- Village
- Interactive map of Kothacheruvu
- Location in Andhra Pradesh, India
- Country: India
- State: Andhra Pradesh
- District: Sri Sathya Sai
- Founder: Polineni Venkatappa & Karnuthala Papana
- Talukas: Kothacheruvu

Population (2001)
  - Total: 38,665

Languages
  - Official: Telugu
- Time zone: UTC+5:30 (IST)
- PIN: 515133
- Telephone code: 08555

Kothacheruvu is a village in Sri Sathya Sai district of the Indian state of Andhra Pradesh. It is the headquarters of Kothacheruvu mandal in Puttaparthi revenue division.
