= Kadiri =

Kadiri 3rd Nava Narasimha Temple
- Town
- Nickname: Khadri
- Interactive map of Kadiri
- Location in Andhra Pradesh, India
- Coordinates: 14.12°N 78.17°E
- Country: India
- State: Andhra Pradesh
- District: Sri Sathya Sai

Area
  - Total: 25.88 km^{2} (9.99 sq mi)
  - Rank: 2
- Elevation: 504 m (1,654 ft)

Population (2011)
  - Total: 89,429
  - Density: 3,500/km^{2} (9,100/sq mi)

Languages
  - Official: Telugu
- Time zone: UTC+5:30 (IST)
- PIN: 515 591
- Vehicle registration: AP–39
- Website: kadiri.cdma.ap.gov.in/en

Kadiri is a major city in Sri Sathya Sai District the Indian state of Andhra Pradesh. It is a Selection Grade (Upgraded in Sep 2026 from Special Grade) Municipal City Council and headquarters of Kadiri Mandal and Kadiri Revenue Division. Kadiri Taluka ('Mandalam') was the largest taluk in the state of Andhra Pradesh. Kadiri is known for its jasmine and saffron flowers. Kadiri saffron is widely sold in Andhra and Karnataka. The Sri Lakshmi Narasimhaswamy Temple is reminiscent of Kadiri to the people of Karnataka, Telangana And Tamil Nadu. The name of Kadiri has also some interesting past. The town was initially named as Khadripuram as khadara plants were found in the surrounding forests.

== Notable locations ==
=== Sri Khadri Lakshmi Narasimha Swamy Temple ===
According to Hindu mythology, Lord Narasimha emerged as Swayambhu from the roots of the Kadiri tree to assassinate Hiranyakashyap - the father of Prahlada. Because of this, a pilgrimage takes place in this location. The pilgrimage is a hub for Hindu devotees. The festival is celebrated with great pomp and occurs in Kadiri every year.

=== Thimmamma Marrimanu ===
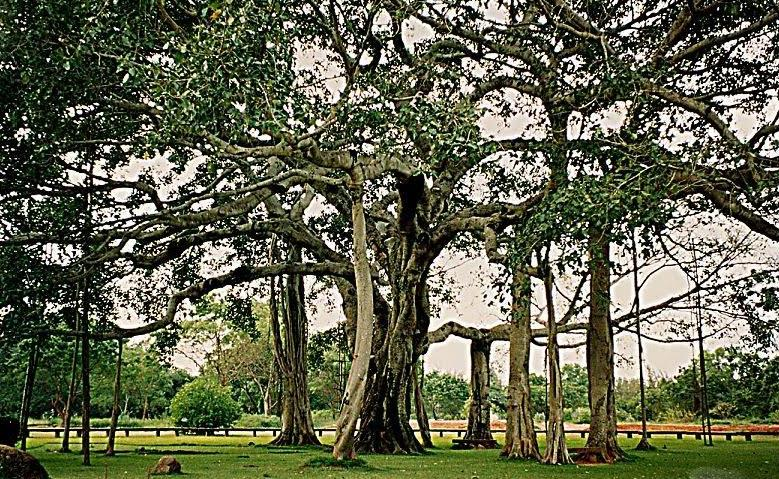
Thimmamma Marrimanu Near Kadiri

Thimmamma Marrimanu is a banyan tree which is located at about 25 km from Kadiri. This historical tree is situated in the district of Ananthpur. In the name of the tree, the word ‘marri’ means banyan and ‘manu’ means tree in Telugu language. A large jatara is conducted at Thimmamma on the day of the Shivaratri festival, when thousands flock to the tree to worship it.The Thimmamma Marrimanu Development Board, under the presidency of T. Gajula Narasaiah, a freedom fighter, former Samithi president, and member of the Janata Dal National Council, has been involved in the development and maintenance of the heritage site. .

=== Batrepalli waterfalls ===
The Batrepalli waterfalls are located in Talupula mandal, near Kadiri. They are active from September to December. During the holiday season, they turn into a busy picnic spot.

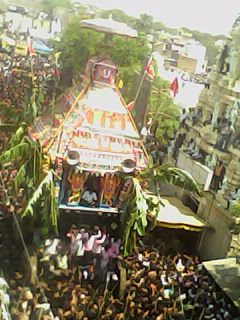
Annual Chariot Festival At Kadiri

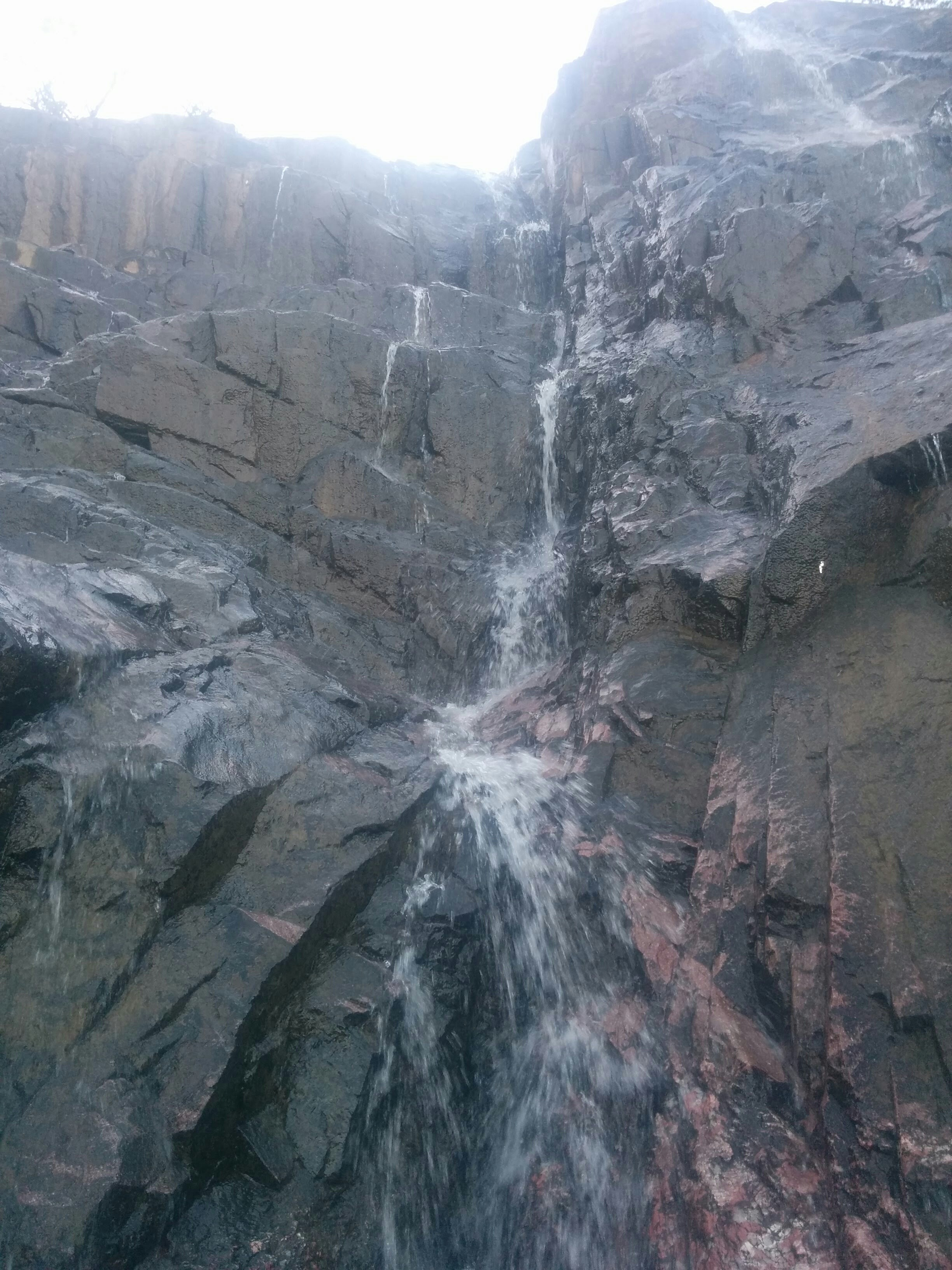
Batrepalli Waterfalls Near Kadiri

=== Yogi VemanaSamadhi ===
The home of the poet Vemana. Vemana is widely known as the people's poet as the poems written by him are simple and colloquial, narrating the truths of everyday life and social evils. His poems describe the subjects of Yoga, wisdom and morality.

== Transport ==
=== Roads ===
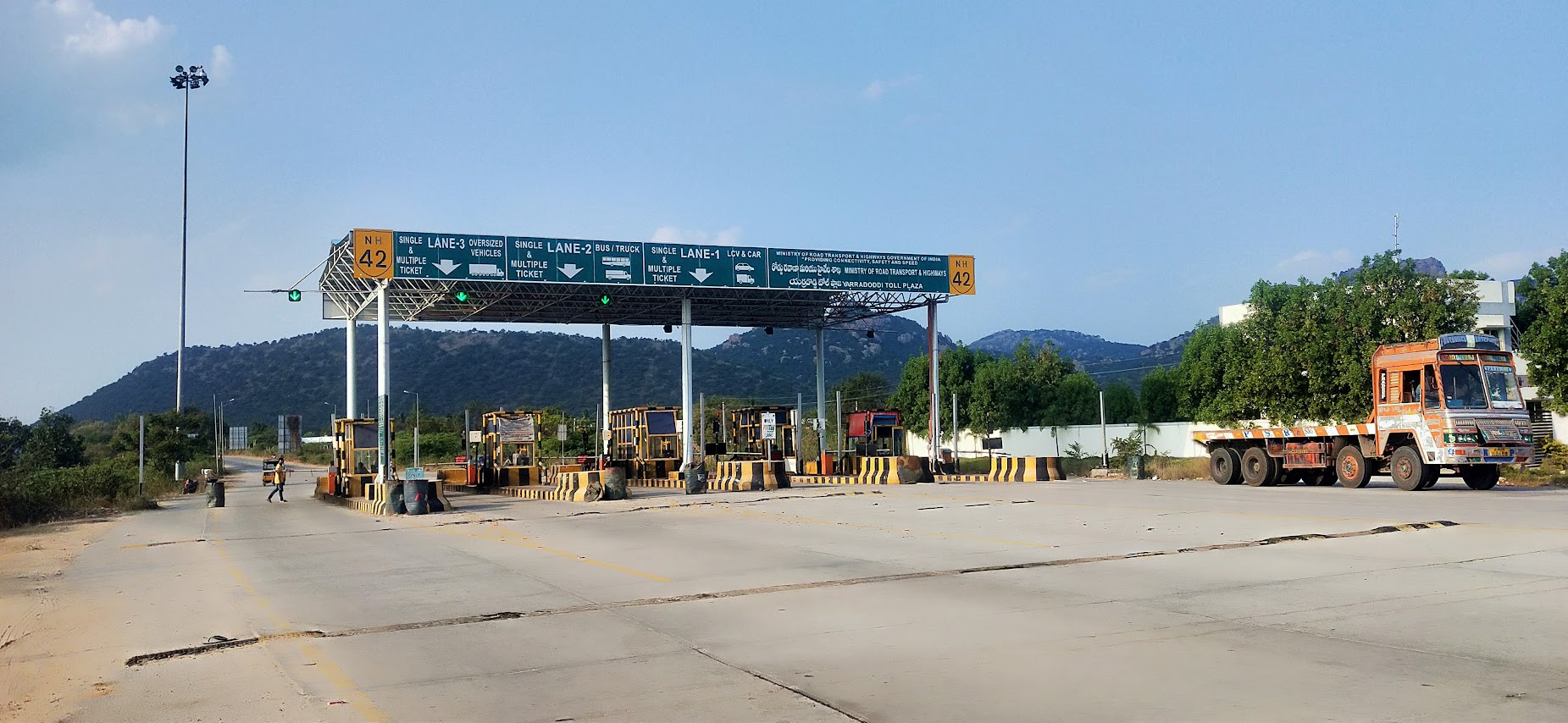
Toll Plaza Near Kadiri

Kadiri is situated on the NH-42 highway, which connects Kadiri with major cities including Hyderabad, Tirupati, Anantapur, Chennai, and Kurnool.

State highways originating from Kadiri include:

1. Jammalamadugu Highway (Merged into NH716G)

2. Hindupur Road (Merged into NH716G)

3. Rajampeta Road

Kadiri is classified as a 'sector' in Bangalore Majestic Terminal 3, undertaking some of the major towns of Kadapa District including Pulivendula, Jammalamadugu and Proddatur.

Kadiri has buses to major cities including Anantapur, Hindupur, Madanapalle, Pulivendula, Rayachoti, Bangalore, Puttaparthi, Chennai and Hyderabad, which are operated by the Andhra Pradesh State Road Transport Corporation. Kadiri’s APSRTC depot is the second largest bus depot in Anantapur district.

A new bypass to Kadiri has been sanctioned for Rs 240 crores to alleviate traffic congestion caused by heavy load lorries travelling to Bangalore, Chennai, Tirupati, Anantapur, and other cities. This bypass is due to take the place of the previous bypass. This bypass is to include three flyovers, one at the Kadiri-Anantapur highway, one at the Kadiri-Bangalore road, and one at the sunnapugutta thanda. It will be 13 kilometres long. The construction is progressing at a rapid pace, with the belt on the Kadiri-Anantapur highway and the Pulivendula road having been finished.

=== Railways ===
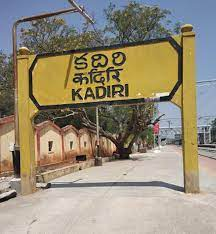
Kadiri Railway Station Board

Kadiri Railway Station is situated on the Dharmavaram–Pakala branch line. Kadiri has daily express trains to Tirupati, Vijayawada, Nellore, Ongole and Bi-weekly Train connecting Amravati of Maharastra and a superfast train to Mumbai And Nagercoil (Kanyakumari), Chittoor, and Katpadi four days a week and a weekly express to Madurai and daily passenger trains to Guntakal and Tirupati.

== Topography ==
Kadiri is located at 78.170 degrees E longitude and 14.120 degrees N latitude and has an average elevation of 504.00 meters (1653 feet) above MSL. Kadiri is surrounded by hill on the north and east.

The town is situated in the center of the Kadiri taluk between Anantapur and Madanapalli towns and situated in Anantapur District and which is 90 km from Anantapur. The Municipality is divided into 36 election wards. The Sudda Vagu River Flows to its west.

== Climate and rainfall ==
The Climate is tropical in Kadiri. In winter there is much more rainfall in Kadiri than in summer. In December, the average temperature is 23.60 °C during day time. The average temperature at night is 16 °C, the lowest temperature of the whole year. During summer from March to May, the maximum temperature in May rises to 48 °C.

It cools down as soon as the southwest monsoon breaks out in the month of June. The annual average rainfall in the town is around 700mm from both the northeast & southwest monsoons. The rainfall mainly occurs during the rainy season i.e., from June to September due to southwest monsoons. Rains during the month October, November and also December occur due to the northeast monsoon, which is about twenty percent of the total annual rainfall.

=== Environmental issues ===
The rainfall in Kadiri is sparse and spasmodic. Borewells provide most water for drinking purposes. There are no perennial rivers in the vicinity of Kadiri which results in excess dependence on underground water. Over-exploitation of ground water and indiscriminate drilling of bores for the past few years has caused depletion of the ground water table and drying of bore wells. The water is being supplied to the public every two days through the Chitravathi Balancing Reservoir.

== Demographics ==
As of the 2011 Indian census, Kadiri has a population of 89,429, of which 44,375 are males and 45,054 are females.

As per 2001 Census report, the population of the town was 76,261 and increased to 89,240 in 2011, thus recording a 17.02% growth. The population density is about 3500 persons per sq. km. Demographic studies showed a projection of 115,000 the year 2032 and 135,100 for 2047.

== Government and politics ==
=== Civic administration ===
Kadiri Municipality is the urban local body of the town It has a jurisdictional area of 52.38 km^{2} (20.22 mi^{2}). It was constituted as a municipality in the year 1964 as III grade and was upgraded to II grade in 1999. It was later upgraded to a Special Grade Municipality.

=== Politics ===
Year	Member	Political party
1952	K.V. Vema Reddy	Indian National Congress
1955	K.V. Vema Reddy	Indian National Congress
1962	E. Gopalu Naik	Indian National Congress
1967	K.V. Vema Reddy	Indian National Congress
1972	C. Narayana Reddy	Independent politician
1978	Nawab Mayana Nizam Vali	Indian National Congress
1983	Mohammed Shakir	Telugu Desam Party
1985	Chennur Abdul Rasool	Telugu Desam Party
1989	Mohammed Shakir	Indian National Congress
1994	Jonna Suryanarayana	Telugu Desam Party
1999	M S Parthasarathi	Bharatiya Janata Party
2004	Jonna Ramaiah	Indian National Congress
2009	Kandikunta Venkata Prasad	Telugu Desam Party
2014	Attar. Chand Basha	YSR Congress Party
2019	Dr. Pedaballi Venkata Sidda Reddy	YSR Congress Party
2024	Kandikunta Venkata Prasad	Telugu Desam Party

== Economy ==
An industrial estate was established under APIIC in 49.29 acres (19.95 ha).

Kadiri is one of the important agriculture centers in Anantapuramu district, being surrounded by a number of villages whose activity is mainly agriculture. The major crops cultivated here are paddy, jowar, tobacco and cotton. Other crops also grown here are groundnuts, sunflowers, toor dal, mustard seeds and sugar cane.

== Education ==
The primary and secondary school education is imparted by government, aided and private schools, under the School Education Department of the state.

- Groundnut Agricultural Research Centre, Kadiri (a unit of Acharya N.G. Ranga Agricultural University)
- Agricultural Research Station, Acharya NG Ranga Agricultural University Kadiri, Ananthapuramu, District, Andhra Pradesh, Is one of the five major lead centres of Groundnut Research in India under AICRP G of ICAR- Directorate of Groundnut Research, Junagadh, Gujarat State. Catering the Research and Developmental needs of Groundnut crop in AP. This research station have released 15 new High Yielding groundnut varieties Kadiri 1 (1971) Kadiri 2 (1978) Kadiri 3 (1978), Vemana (1993), Kadiri 4 (1995), Kadiri 5 (2002), Kadiri 6 (2002), Kadiri 7 bold (2009), Kadiri 8 (2009), Kadiri 9 (2009), Kadiri Anantha (2010), Kadiri Harithandhra (2010), Kadiri Amaravati (2016), Kadiri Chitravathi (2020), Kadiri Lepakshi 1812 (2020) for general cultivation in the farmers fields.
- Sericulture Research Institute, Kutagulla village, Kadiri Mandal.
- Govt Junior College Separate For Both Boys And Girls on Bypass Road
- Govt Polytechnic Kadiri
- STSN Govt Degree And PG College
- Municipal High Schools
- Municipal Urdu Schools

== See also ==
- Chandravadana and Mohiyar
- Kadiri (Assembly constituency)
- Kadiri Revenue Division
- Ambur Biryani center
