= Nallamada =

- Village
- Interactive map of Nallamada
- Location in Andhra Pradesh, India
- Coordinates: 14°12′59″N 77°59′40″E
- Country: India
- State: Andhra Pradesh
- District: Sri Sathya Sai
- Talukas: Puttaparthi

Languages
  - Official: Telugu
- Time zone: UTC+5:30 (IST)
- PIN: 515501
- Vehicle registration: AP

Nallamada is a village in Sri Sathya Sai district of the Indian state of Andhra Pradesh. It is the headquarters of Nallamada mandal in Puttaparthi revenue division.
