= Nawab Mayana Nizam Vali =

Indian politician

Nawab Mayana Nizam Vali (N. M. Nizam Vali)

Former Minister of Forest & jails, Govt of Andhra Pradesh
- In office 1978–1983
- Constituency: Kadiri, Anantapur district

Personal details
- Born: 6 August 1930 Kadiri, India
- Died: 27 July 1987 (aged 56) Kadiri, India
- Party: Indian National Congress, Communist Party of India
- Spouse: N.M. BibiJan
- Children: N.M. Iliyaz, N.M. Muzafar Ali, Ameeza, N.M. Mukaram, Munavar Begum, N.M. Dowlath Khan, N.M. Badiruddin, N.M. Ali Shuja & Sanavar

Nawab Mayana Nizam Vali (6 August 1930 – 27 July 1987) was an Indian politician from Andhra Pradesh province. Born on 6 August 1930, Mr Nizam Vali took a plunge into the politician arena at the age of 15 as a sympathizer of the Communist Party of India . He was formally initiated into the Communist Party of India followed by Indian National Congress later.

== Personal life ==
N. M. Nizam Vali was the second son of Nawab Mayana Badiruddin a wealthy landlord of his times in Kadiri town of Anantapur district, Andhra Pradesh. He was a daring and dynamic personality right from his childhood. As a child he used to challenge common irrational fears and beliefs among friends. At an early age he used to sleep on village graves to prove that devils exist nowhere except in human minds. Throughout his life, Nizam Vali stood for the rights of the poor and the needy. When one Ramudu, a poor man from Kadiri, died in police custody in 1985, he sat for a hunger strike unto death (Amarana Nirahara Deeksha) seeking justice.

He always sought people’s unity and harmony among different communities. When there was a communal riot at Kadiri town in 1984, he worked hard to unify the riot affected people. He always said communal divide between common people will benefit the rich and influential. Subsequent political developments proved him right. He and his close friend Dr Srinivasulu Naidu were instrumental in restoring normalcy in the town.

=== Religion ===
Nizam Vali remained a revolutionary to the core all through his life. He was an agnostic in faith. He used to lament the exploitation of the poor in the name of religion. He saw unity in the basic beliefs of all people irrespective of their religion. "Beliefs like the existence of Swarg Narak, Paap Punya etc were same among all people. There are only two religions. The religion of the rich, The religion of the poor. The poor suffer the most, no matter what religion they belonged to," he used to say.

=== Honour ===
People of Kadiri honored him with title "Rayalaseema Tiger" after his dynamic leadership.

== Positions held ==
- Minister of State for Wakf
- Mines, Geology, Prisons Minister
- Forest Minister
- District Joint Secretary CPI (United)
- State Vice-President, Pradesh Congress Committee
- Lifetime president Beedi Mazdoor Union, Kadiri.

== Family and Lineage ==
N. M. Nizam Vali belonged to the family of Mayana Nawabs that had once ruled Gandikota fort of Kadapa. He was the great grandson of Davulat Khan Mayana, a philanthropist of his times. Nizam Vali’s elder brother M. A. Mayana was a famous advocate of Kadiri town.

== Early life in Communist Party ==
Nizam Vali was a committed Communist who sincerely worked for the spread of the Communist movement in Kadiri and Hindupur taluqs of Anantapur district in Andhra Pradesh.

The Communist Party of India had assigned to Nizam Vali the task of organizing Beedi workers, who were wallowing in pathetic conditions. Nizam Vali organized the poor Beedi workers into a united force that fought against the exploitative Beedi owners. Nizam Vali used to point out the pure class antagonism between Beedi workers and Beedi owners.

Nizam Vali was a close associate of Communist leader Idukallu Sadasivan. He worked along with stalwart leaders like T. Nagi Reddy in fighting against the feudal lords and factionalists from Dorigallu area of the erstwhile Kadiri taluq. Nizam Vali was the motivating force behind T. Nagi Reddy’s agitation against a feudal lord and faction leader near Mudigubba village of Anantapur district.

Prime Minister Jawaharlal Nehru had visited Kadiri town in 1964. Communist Party was very strong in Kadiri area under the leadership of Nizam Vali. The number of Communist workers and sympathizers carrying Red Flags that converged at the venue of the meeting was so high that it prompted Nehru to exclaim "I feel as if I am standing in the streets of Moscow."

=== Dokkala Karuvu in Anantapur district ===
A great famine that reminisced the Dokkala Karuvu of the 19th century had visited Rayalaseema region in the 1960s. There was severe shortage of food grains due to the prevalent drought. Innumerable people, including landlords owning huge tracts of land starved as a result of lack of food. Nizam Vali organized porridge camps as a leader of the Communist Party of India. He had earned the appreciation of the likes of T. Nagi Reddy by organizing such camps to provide relief to people from hunger.

=== Jai Andhra movement ===
During the Jai Andhra movement of 1971, Nizam Vali stood for Visalandhra. He dared to resist the Jai Andhra agitationists. There were confrontations between supporters of Jai Andhra and the advocates of Visalandhra. During one such confrontation, Nizam Vali daringly rescued Visalandhra supporters surrounded by Jai Andhra agitationists. He was praised as Tiger of Rayalaseema for his daring act.

== Elections ==
Nizam Vali was elected twice as municipal Chairman Kadiri. He joined the Congress party in 1978 and in the same year he was elected as MLA from Kadiri constituency to become Minister for Wakf in Dr Marri Chenna Reddy’s cabinet. He was later promoted as a Cabinet minister and assigned the portfolio of Forests, Mines, Geology, Prisons and Sugar industry. As the Minister for Forests, Nizam Vali strived hard for the afforestation of Andhra Pradesh. He took forward the scheme "Intinta Chettu Ooroora Vanam" (With a tree in every home, every village would be an orchard) with activist's zeal. As the Forest Minister he reinstated hundreds of low level staff of forest department that had lost jobs on silly charges.
