= Mohammed Shakir (Indian politician) =

Former Minister of Tourism & Forest, Govt of Andhra Pradesh

Minister of Tourism & Forest, Govt of Andhra Pradesh
- In office 1983–1994
- Constituency: Kadiri

Personal details
- Born: 16 July 1948 (age 78) Kadiri
- Party: YSR Congress Party
- Spouse: Shahnaz Shakir
- Children: 4
- Criminal information
- Penalty: 5 years of imprisonment for defrauding PNB

Mohammed Shakir (born 16 July 1948) is a former politician for the Anantapur district. Previously, he served as a Minister in the state cabinet as well as in the AP Legislative Assembly.

== Early life ==
He was born on 16 July 1948 to Late Haji M. Abdul Rahman, He was the fifth among the 16 children in the family. He studied in the local Zilla Parishad High School and later on in 1974 graduated with B.Sc from Veerashaiva College in Bellary becoming the first person in his family to have a degree. After completing his education he moved back to his home town of Kadiri and became a textile trader. In the same year he married Shahnaz Shakir.

== Career ==
In 1983 he was elected to the AP Legislative Assembly and served in the cabinet of Shri N.T. Rama Rao garu. In 1989 he contested the elections again and became a MLA. His wife Shahnaz Shakir was elected the Chairperson of the Kadiri Municipal Council in 2000, becoming the first woman to be elected to that post.

In 2010 he became a member of the YSR Congress Party and participated in the fast with Y. S. Jaganmohan Reddy, the President of YSR Congress Party. He is presently in the process of establishing the party in the villages adjoining Kadiri. He and other leaders have recently opened a party office in Kadiri from where they are able to reach out to the general public. He is actively involved in public welfare and social causes.

== Conviction ==
In May 2016, the Times of India reported that at a special court for Central Bureau of Investigation (CBI) cases, Shakir was sentenced to 5 years in jail for defrauding the Sanatnagar branch of Punjab National Bank (PNB) of Rs. 8.29 crore. The Hindu reported that Shakir was sentenced to 5 years of rigorous imprisonment and that a political accomplice, Kandikunta Venkata Prasad, was sentenced to 7 years; and reported that the politicians had "connived with the bank officials in an innovative fraud linked to generating fake demand drafts". The bank had filed the original complaint with the CBI in 2003. At the sentencing, the CBI reported that the accused had acquired large properties with the amounts that were defrauded.

In October 2004, the Times of India reported Shakir was arrested and released on bail by the Bangalore police in connection with a separate land dispute. The charge related to a dispute over Rs 2 crore worth of land he had purchased from a retired deputy superintendent of police in Kadiri in Anantapur district, who had got the land registered in his relative's name.

== See also ==
- 1983 Andhra Pradesh Legislative Assembly election
- 1989 Andhra Pradesh Legislative Assembly election
