= Nambulapulakunta =

Coordinates: 14°03′43″N 78°19′07″E

- Village
- Interactive map of Nambulapulakunta
- Location in Andhra Pradesh, India
- Country: India
- State: Andhra Pradesh
- District: Sri Sathya Sai

Population
  - Total: 30,134

Languages
  - Official: Telugu
- Time zone: UTC+5:30 (IST)
- Vehicle registration: AP

Nambulapulakunta is a village in Sri Sathya Sai district of the Indian state of Andhra Pradesh. It is the headquarters of Nambulapulakunta mandal in Kadiri revenue division. According to the Geological Survey of India, pyrophyllite and radiating crystals of chloritoid are located in the ridges to the north of Nambulapulakunta.
