= Hindupur mandal =

- Mandal
- Interactive map of Hindupur mandal
- Location in Andhra Pradesh, India
- Coordinates: 13.8300°N 77.4900°E
- Country: India
- State: Andhra Pradesh
- District: Puttaparthi
- Headquarters: Hindupur

Population (2011)
  - Total: 203,538

Languages
  - Official: Telugu, Urdu
- Time zone: UTC+5:30 (IST)
- Vehicle registration: AP

Hindupur mandal is one of the 29 mandals in Sri Sathya Sai district of the Indian state of Andhra Pradesh. It is administered under Penukonda revenue division and its headquarters are located at Hindupur The mandal is bounded by Somandepalle, Chilamathur, Lepakshi and Parigi mandals, with a portion of it also bordering the state of Karnataka.

== Towns and villages ==
As of 2011 census, the mandal has 15 settlements. It includes, 1 town and 14 villages.

1. Bevina Halli
2. Chalivendala
3. Chowlur
4. Devarapalle
5. Gollapuram
6. Hindupur
7. Kirikera
8. Kotipi
9. Maluguru
10. Manesamudram
11. Nakkalapalle
12. Santhebidanur
13. Sreekanthapuram (R)
14. Thumukunta
15. Thungepalle

== Members Zilla Panchayat Territorial Constitutency (ZPTC's) ==
Year	Member	Political Party
2006	T. Gangarathnamma	Telugu Desam Party
2014	K L Adinarayana.	Telugu Desam Party

== See also ==
- List of mandals in Andhra Pradesh
