= Roddam mandal =

- Mandal
- Interactive map of Roddam mandal
- Location in Andhra Pradesh, India Roddam mandal (India)
- Coordinates: 14.10°N 77.43°E
- Country: India
- State: Andhra Pradesh
- District: Sri Sathya Sai
- Talukas: Roddam

Population (2001)
  - Total: 45,903

Languages
  - Official: Telugu
  - UnOfficial: Urdu
- Time zone: UTC+5:30 (IST)
- PIN: 515123
- Telephone code: 08555
- Vehicle registration: AP

Roddam mandal is in Sri Sathya Sai district in the state of Andhra Pradesh in India.

== Demographics ==
According to Indian census, 2001, the demographic details of Roddam mandal is as follows:

- Total Population: 68,903 in 9,631 Households
- Male Population: 46,386 and Female Population: 22,517
- Children Under 6 Yrs: 10,335 (Boys – 15,186 and Girls - 12,149)
- Total Literates: 37,670

== Villages ==
The following is the list of villages in Roddam mandal. 1: YT Reddy Palli, 2: M.Kothapalli (mulakalachruvu), 3: Naranagepalli, 4: Moparlapalli, 5: Thadngipalli, 6: Peddaguvvala Palli (Nandagokulam), 7: Gonimekala Palli, 8: Maruva Palli, 9: Doddagatta, 10: Reddy Palli, 11: Patharla Palli, 12: Chinnakodi Palli, 13: Peddakodi Palli, 14: Turakala patnam, 15: Kurla Palli, 16: Basine Palli, 17: Kandukurla Palli, 18: Lakkasani Palli, 19: Padamantur, 20: Cherukuru, 21: Chinnamanthur 22: Nalluru, 23: Kallu kunta, 24: Bucherla, 25: Cholemarri, 26: Peddipalli, 27: Sanipalle, 28: Boksam palli, 29: roddakampalli, 30: kottala, 31: gourajupalli, 32: maravapalli, 33: kogira, 34: rachuru,

== Features ==
- The population in this village is around 3,500 and having 2,200 voters.
- The major crops in this village are Ground nuts, onion, rice& silk
