= Muppavaram =

- Village
- Interactive map of Muppavaram
- Location in Andhra Pradesh, India Muppavaram (India)
- Coordinates: 16.798643°N 81.227058°E
- Country: India
- State: Andhra Pradesh
- District: Eluru
- Mandal: Denduluru

Population (2011)
  - Total: 415

Languages
  - Official: Telugu
- Time zone: UTC+05:30 (IST)

Muppavaram(gandi vari gudem) is a village in Eluru district of the Indian state of Andhra Pradesh. It is administered under of Eluru revenue division. The nearest railway station is located at Chinna Ganjam (CJM) which is 26.51 km from Muppavaram.

== Demographics ==
As of 2011 Census of India, Muppavaram has population of 415 of which 217 are males while 198 are females. Average Sex Ratio is 912. Population of children between ages 0–6 is 47 which makes up 11.33% of total population of village, Child sex ratio is 874. The literacy rate of the village was 77.99%.
