= P. V. Sidda Reddy =

Indian politician

Pedaballi Venkata Sidda Reddy (born 4 August 1968) is an Indian politician from Andhra Pradesh. He was an MLA from Kadiri Assembly constituency in the erstwhile Anantapur district which is presently renamed as Sri Sathya Sai district. He won the 2019 Andhra Pradesh Legislative Assembly election representing YSR Congress Party.

== Early life and education ==
Reddy was born in R.S. Road, Kadiri to Pedaballi Chinna Gangi Reddy. He completed his M.S. from Institute of Medical Sciences, Banaras Hindu University, Varanasi, U.P.

== Career ==
He started his political career with Indian National Congress. He later joined YSR Congress Party and won the 2019 Andhra Pradesh Legislative Assembly election from Kadiri Assembly Constituency defeating Kandikunta Venkata Prasad of Telugu Desam Party by a margin of 27,243 votes.

On 10 July 2024, YSR Congress Party suspended him for alleged anti-party activities after an inquiry.
