= Dharmavaram revenue division =

- revenue division in Sri Sathya Sai district
- Country: India
- State: Andhra Pradesh
- District: Sri Sathya Sai
- Headquarters: Dharmavaram
- Time zone: UTC+05:30 (IST)

Dharmavaram revenue division (or Dharmavaram division) is a Revenue division in the Sri Sathya Sai district of the Indian state of Andhra Pradesh. It is one of the 5 revenue divisions in the district with 7 mandals under its administration.

== Administration ==
There are 7 mandals administered under Dharmavaram revenue division.

1. Bathalapalle
2. Chennekothapalle
3. Dharmavaram
4. Kanaganapalle
5. Mudigubba
6. Ramagiri
7. Tadimarri

== See also ==
- List of revenue divisions in Andhra Pradesh
