= K. L. Adinarayana =

Indian politician

K L Adinarayana

ZPTC Hindupur(M)
- In office 05 August 2014 – 05 August 2019
- Constituency: Hindupur mandal

Personal details
- Born: 21 February 1969 (age 57) Gollapuram, Hindupur Taluk, Anantapur District, Andhrapradesh
- Party: TDP
- As of 24 June, 2019

Adinarayana K L is an Indian politician, belonging to Telugu Desam Party. In the 2014 Andhra Pradesh urban local bodies elections he was elected to the ZPTC from the Hindupur Mandal in Andhra Pradesh.
