= Puttaparthi revenue division =

Revenue division in Sri Sathya Sai district, Andhra Pradesh, India

- revenue division in Sri Sathya Sai district
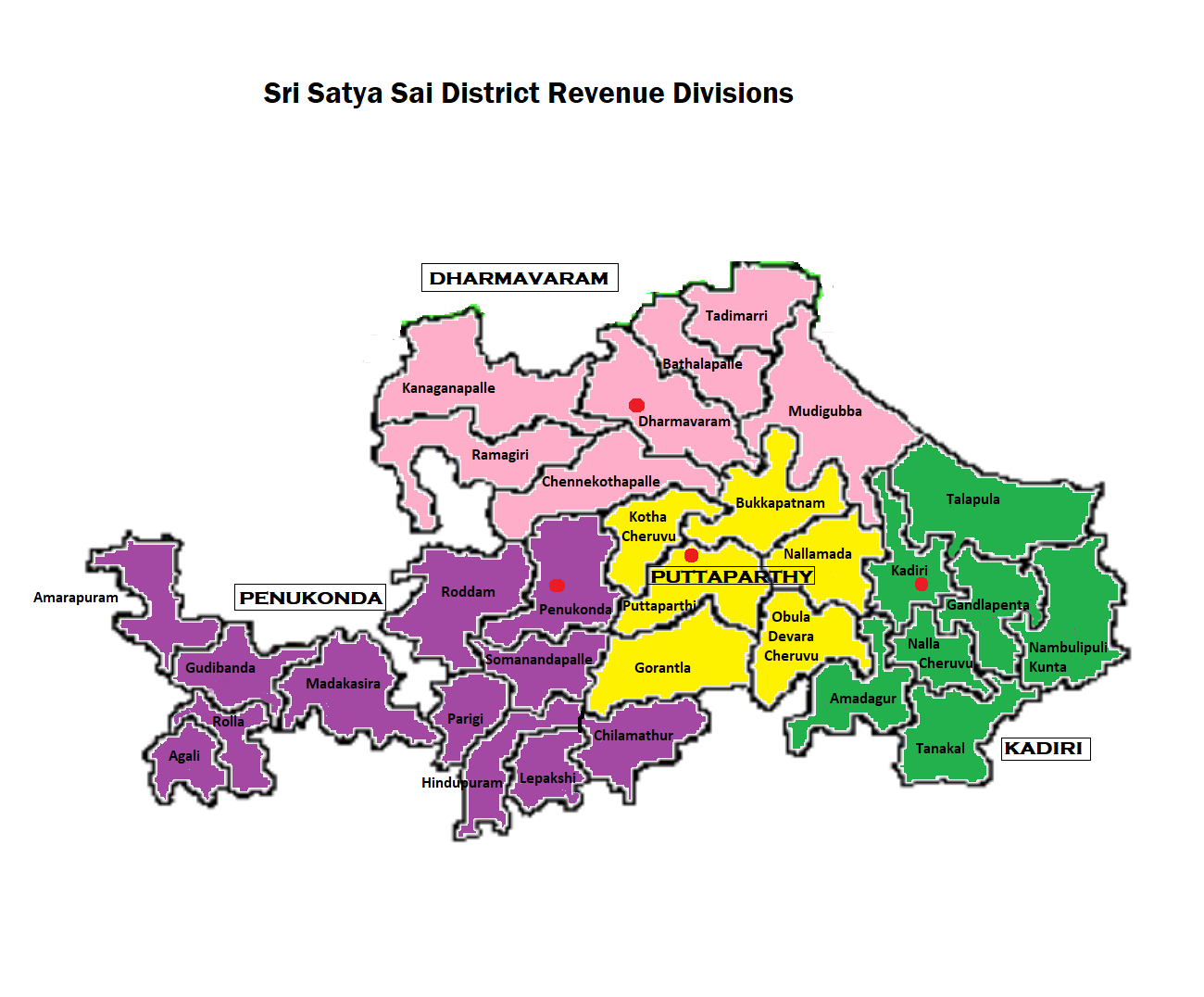
- Puttaparthi revenue division in Sri Sathya Sai district
- Country: India
- State: Andhra Pradesh
- District: Sri Sathya Sai
- Formed: 4 April 2022
- Headquarters: Puttaparthi
- Time zone: UTC+05:30 (IST)

Puttaparthi revenue division is an administrative division in the Sri Sathya Sai district of the Indian state of Andhra Pradesh. It is one of the five revenue divisions in the district and comprises six mandals. The division was newly created along with the district on 4 April 2022.

== Administration ==
The revenue division comprises six mandals.

1. Amadagur
2. Bukkapatnam
3. Kothacheruvu
4. Nallamada
5. Obuladevaracheruvu
6. Puttaparthi
