= Kadiri revenue division =

- revenue division in Sri Sathya Sai district
- Country: India
- State: Andhra Pradesh
- District: Sri Sathya Sai
- Headquarters: Kadiri
- Time zone: UTC+05:30 (IST)

Kadiri revenue division is an administrative division in the Sri Sathya Sai district of the Indian state of Andhra Pradesh. It is one of the 5 revenue divisions in the district with 32 mandals under its administration. The divisional headquarters is located at Kadiri.

== Administration ==
There are 6 mandals administered under Anantapur revenue division. Their headquarters are:

1. Gandlapenta
2. Kadiri
3. Nallacheruvu
4. Nambulapulakunta
5. Talupula
6. Tanakal

== See also ==
- List of revenue divisions in Andhra Pradesh
