= Sri Sathya Sai district =

District in Andhra Pradesh, India

- District of Andhra Pradesh
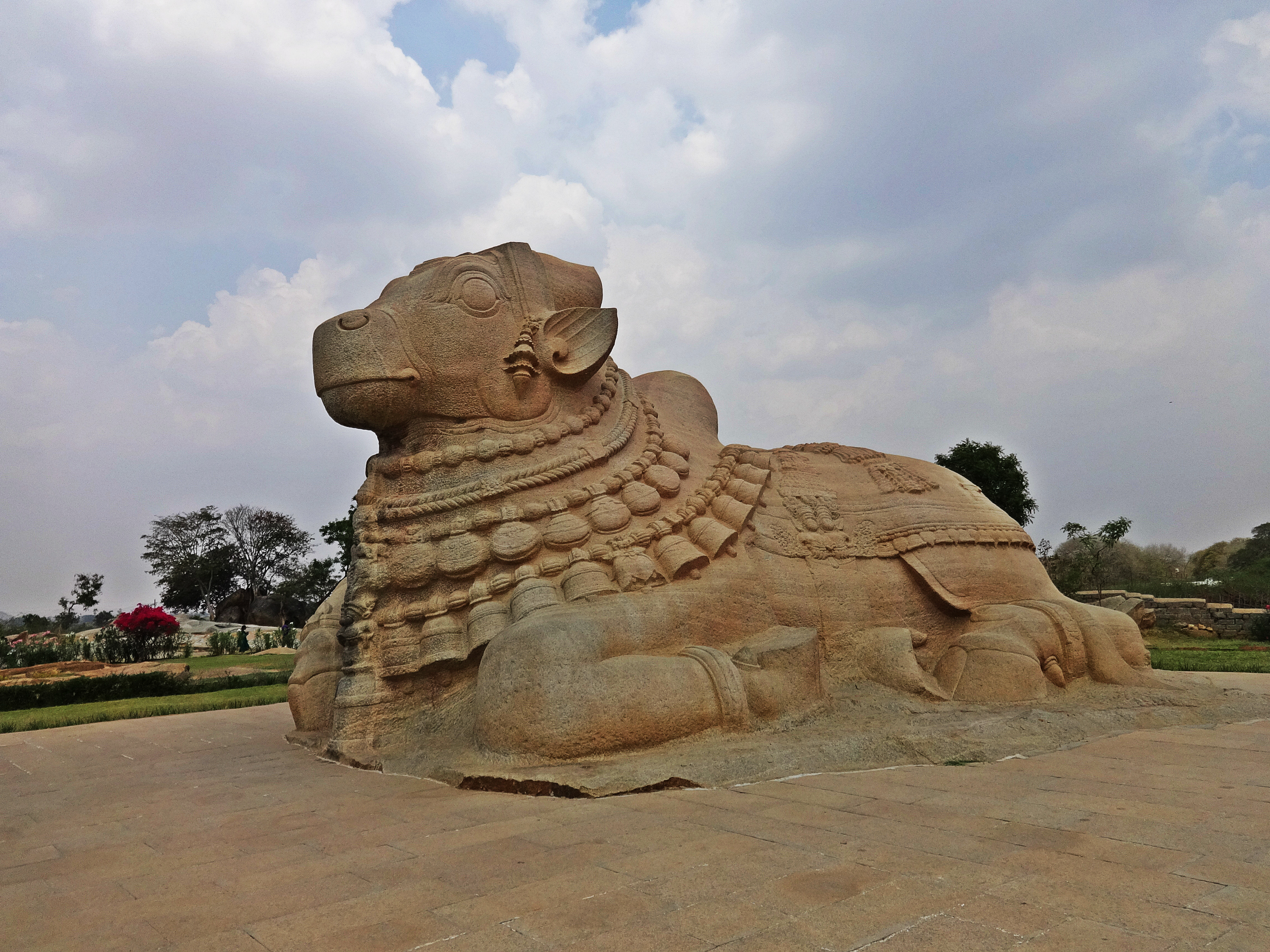
- Nandi at Lepakshi

- Interactive map of Sri Sathya Sai district
- Coordinates (Puttaparthi): 14.16°N 77.81°E
- Country: India
- State: Andhra Pradesh
- Region: Rayalaseema
- Formed: 4 April 2022
- Founder: Government of Andhra Pradesh
- Named for: Sathya Sai Baba
- Headquarters: Puttaparthi
- Largest city: Hindupuram
- Administrative divisions: 5 revenue divisions: Dharmavaram; Kadiri; Madakasira; Penukonda; Puttaparthi; 32 mandals; 5 municipalities; 425 gram panchayats

Government
  - District collector: Shyam Prasad, I.A.S.
  - Lok Sabha constituencies: Hindupuram
  - MP: B K Parthasarathi
  - Assembly constituencies: 6 constituencies: Madakasira (SC); Hindupur; Penukonda; Puttaparthi; Dharmavaram; Kadiri

Area
  - Total: 8,925 km^{2} (3,446 sq mi)

Population (2011)
  - Total: 1,840,043
  - Density: 206.2/km^{2} (534.0/sq mi)
- Time zone: UTC+05:30 (IST)
- District LGD code: 754
- District abbreviation: SSS
- Website: srisathyasai.ap.gov.in

Sri Sathya Sai district is a district in the Indian state of Andhra Pradesh. Its headquarters is at Puttaparthi. It was formed on 4 April 2022 from parts of the erstwhile Anantapur district.

== Etymology ==
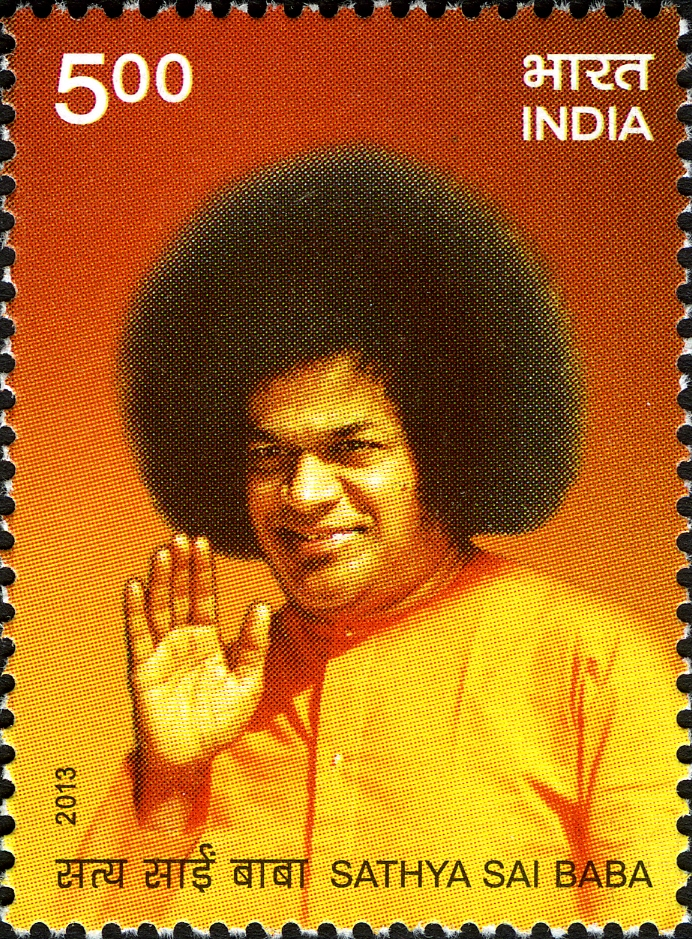
Sri Sathya Sai Baba

This district is named after Indian Guru Sri Sathya Sai Baba, who contributed to improving the infrastructure of the Rayalaseema region by building schools, university, free healthcare institutions and drinking water projects.

== History ==
Sri Sathya Sai district was formed on 4 April 2022 from the Dharmavaram, Penukonda, Kadiri revenue divisions of erstwhile Anantapur district. A new Puttaparthi revenue division is created as part of the formation. On Dec 31st 2025 Madakasira revenue division formed in this district.

== Geography ==
This district is bounded on the North by Anantapur district, on the East by Annamayya district and Kadapa district and on the West and South West by Chitradurga, Tumakuru, Chikkaballapura districts of Karnataka State.

Mallappakonda, Penukonda, Madakasira and Nagasamudram are the major hill ranges, which account for the uncultivable, uninhabitable regions in the district. Pennar, Chitravathi, Jayamangala, Maddileru, Papagni, Vandamaneru, Tadakaleru, Pandameru are the main rivers. The district has average elevation of about 1760 feet which results in h tolerable climate throughout the year. The normal rainfall is 590.9 mm, 60.3% of which happens during The normal the South West Monsoon period. March, April and May are warm months with the normal maximum temperature range of 37.6 °C - 39.2 °C. December and January are cooler months with the normal minimum temperature range of 17.5 °C to 17.7 °C. The soils are mostly red soil in the district.

=== Mineral resources ===
Gold, diamond, quartz, granite, pyrophyllite, road metal, gravel are found in the district.

== Demographics ==
Religions in Sri Sathya Sai district based on 2011 Census
| Religion | Percent |
| Hinduism | 87.89% |
| Islam | 11.47% |
| Other or not stated | 0.64% |
Distribution of religions

Based on 2011 census, the district had a population of 1,840,043 of which 392,357 (21.32%) lives in urban areas. Sri Sathyasai district has a sex ratio of 975 females per 1000 males. Scheduled Castes and Scheduled Tribes make up 2,48,993 (13.53%) and 83,966 (4.56%) of the population respectively.

Languages of Sri Sathya Sai district based on 2011 Census
1. Telugu (78.5%)
2. Urdu (11.0%)
3. Kannada (7.08%)
4. Lambadi (2.67%)
5. Others (0.75%)

Based on 2011 census, 78.47% of the population spoke Telugu, 11.03% Urdu, 7.08% Kannada and 2.67% Lambadi as their first language.

== Politics ==
There are one parliamentary and six assembly constituencies in the district. The parliamentary constituency is Hindupur The assembly constituencies that constitute it are given below.

| Constituency number | Name | Reserved for (SC/ST/None) | Parliament |
|---|---|---|---|
| 156 | Madakasira | SC | Hindupuram |
| 157 | Hindupuram | None | Hindupuram |
| 158 | Penukonda | None | Hindupuram |
| 159 | Puttaparthi | None | Hindupuram |
| 160 | Dharmavaram | None | Hindupuram |
| 161 | Kadiri | None | Hindupuram |

== Administrative divisions ==
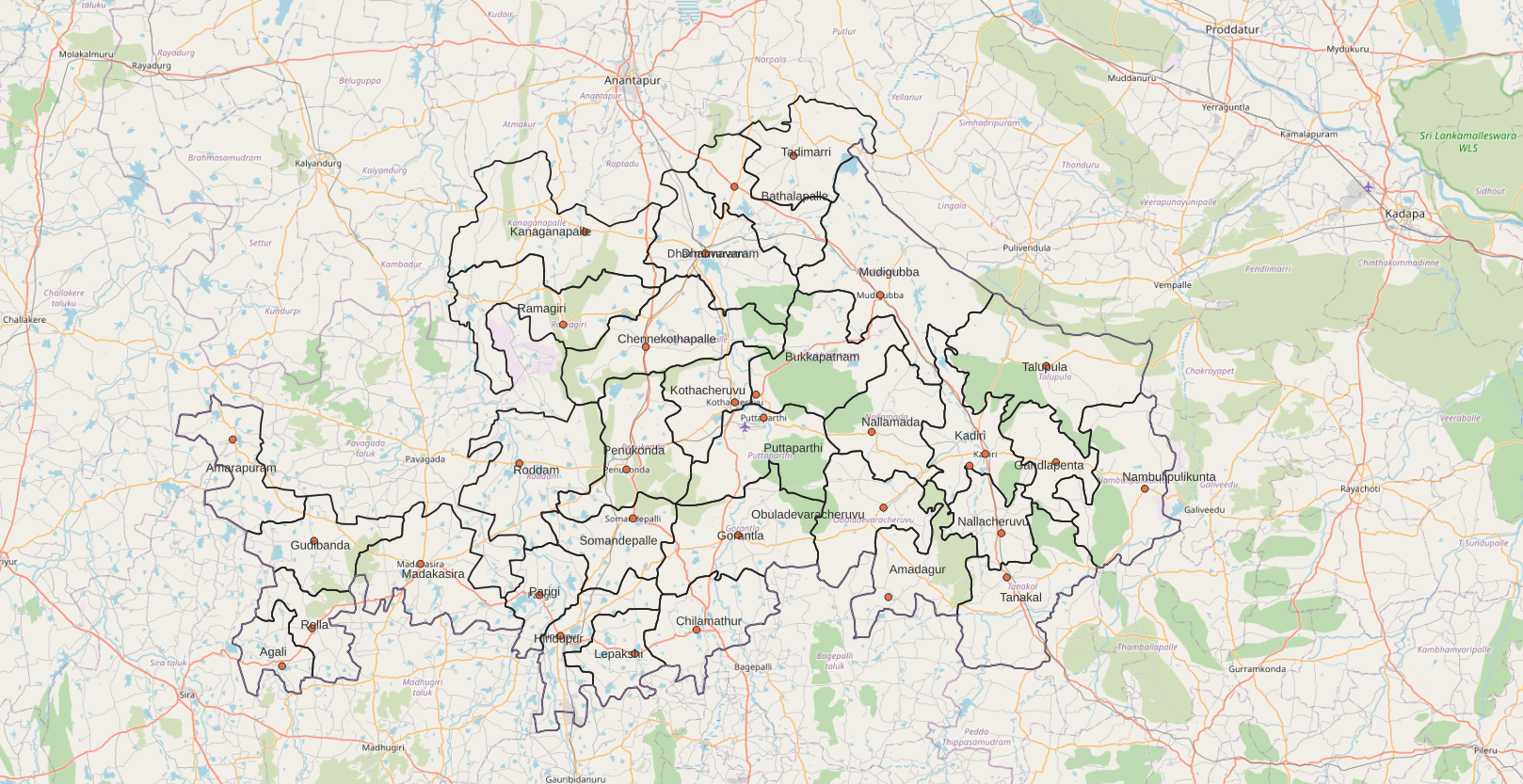
Satellite view of Sri Sathya Sai district

The district is divided into 5 revenue divisions: Dharmavaram, Madakasira, Kadiri, Penukonda and Puttaparthi, which are further subdivided into a total of 32 mandals, each headed by a sub-collector.

=== Mandals ===
The list of 32 mandals in Sri Sathya Sai district, divided into 5 revenue divisions, is given below.

1. Dharmavaram revenue division
  1. Bathalapalle
  2. Chennekothapalle
  3. Dharmavaram
  4. Kanaganapalle
  5. Mudigubba
  6. Ramagiri
  7. Tadimarri
2. Kadiri revenue division
  1. Gandlapenta
  2. Kadiri
  3. Nallacheruvu
  4. Nambulapulakunta
  5. Talupula
  6. Tanakal
3. Madakasira revenue division
  1. Agali
  2. Amarapuram
  3. Gudibanda
  4. Madakasira
  5. Rolla
4. Penukonda revenue division
  1. Chilamathur
  2. Gorantla, Sri Sathya Sai district
  3. Hindupur
  4. Lepakshi
  5. Parigi
  6. Penukonda
  7. Roddam
  8. Somandepalle
5. Puttaparthi revenue division
  1. Amadagur
  2. Bukkapatnam
  3. Kothacheruvu
  4. Nallamada
  5. Obuladevaracheruvu
  6. Puttaparthi

== Cities and towns ==
Hindupur is the largest city in the district, with a population of over 1.5 lakhs, and is the major economic hub in the district. The district has three municipalities at Hindupur, Dharmavaram, Kadiri and three Nagar Panchayats at Puttaparthi, Penukonda and Madakasira.

List of Cities/towns in Sri Sathya Sai District
| City/Town | Civic status | Revenue division | Population |
|---|---|---|---|
| Hindupur | Municipality | Penukonda | 1,51,677 |
| Dharmavaram | Municipality | Dharmavaram | 1,21,874 |
| Kadiri | Municipality | Kadiri | 1,12,283 |
| Puttaparthi | Municipality | Puttaparthi | 68,657 |
| Penukonda | Nagar Panchayat | Penukonda | 27,382 |
| Madakasira | Nagar Panchayat | Madakasira | 21,464 |

== Economy ==
Kia, Berger paints, Texport industries are the major industries in the district. Kia India Private Limited manufactures automobiles in 536-acre factory in Yerramanchi village of Penukonda mandal. It started commercial operations in 2019 with a capital investment of Rs.7948.00 Crs. The plant has annual capacity of 3,50,000 units. It generated 18000 jobs. Berger Paints India Ltd has a paint manufacturing unit at Hindupur. It invested 385 Crs. It started operations in 2016. It generated 1554 jobs. Texport Industries located at Gollapuram in Hindupur mandal manufactures woven and knitted apparel fabric. Texport Industries designs and manufactures soft, casual and sportswear. It has an integrated mill with an investment of Rs.70 Crs. It generated 250 jobs when it commenced operations in November 2017.

== Education ==
As per 2019-20, there are 40 degree colleges, 6 B.Ed colleges, 5 polytechnics, 2 engineering colleges, 15 ITIs, 5 MBA, 5 MCA colleges.

Sri Sathya Sai Institute of Higher Learning (SSSIHL), a deemed university with headquarters at Puttaparthi and additional campuses at Anantapur, kadugodi and Muddenahalli in Karnataka provides free education to students, in various courses has completed 40 years of service in 2021. B.E.S.T Innovation University Private University situated at Palasamudram in 134 Acres offers various courses.

== Transport ==
=== Road ===
NH 42, NH 44, NH 342, NH 716G and NH 544E, pass through the district.

=== Rail ===
Dharmavaram is the major train junction in the district. Bangalore–Guntakal railway line, Guntakal- Tirupati line pass through the district.

=== Air ===
Puttaparthi Airport serves the Sri Sathya Sai Institute of Higher Medical Sciences, Puttaparthi for emergency purposes, and dignitaries who visit the town.

The nearest international airport is the Kempegowda International Airport at Devanahalli, a suburb of Bangalore which is about 119 km from Puttaparthi. 84 km from Hindupur town commercial and biggest town of district.

=== Sea Port ===
Krishnapatnam Port popularly known as KPCL which was operated by Adani Ports & SEZ is 360 KMs from district.

== Tourist attractions ==
Several spiritual and religious, historical places are found in the district.

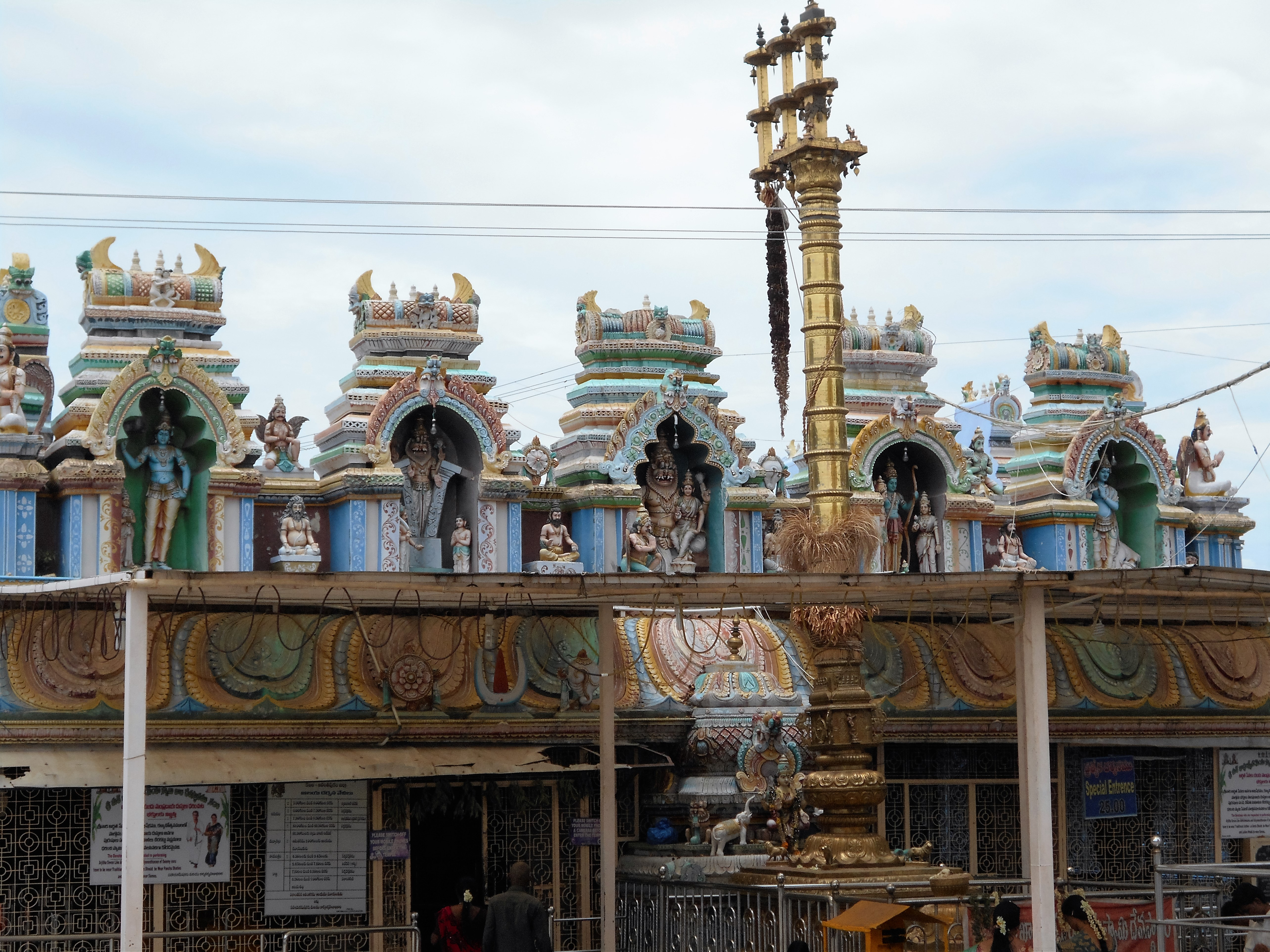
Sri Khadri Lakshmi Narasimha Swamy Temple, Kadiri

- Kadiri: Sri Khadri Lakshmi Narasimha Swamy Temple at Kadiri is dedicated to Lord Vishnu. It is said that Lord Vishnu handed over the deity to Brugu Maharshi for worship.
- Prasanthi Nilayam: Hospital and many institutions founded by Sri Sathya Sai baba.
- Lepakshi: Veerabhadra Swamy temple dating back to Vijayanagar dynasty
- Madakasira Fort, Historical fort dating back to 15th Century CE
- Thimmamma Marrimanu, Gutibayalu: Banyan tree spread over 5 acres.
- Batrepalli waterfalls at Kadiri
- Penukonda Tomb of Baba Fakruddin a sufi saint who settled in Penukonda.

== Notable people ==
Sathya Sai Baba, 20th century Indian guru with worldwide devotees was born in Puttaparthi. He contributed to improving the infrastructure of the Rayalaseema region by building schools, university, free healthcare institutions and drinking water projects.

== Books ==
CPO (2022). Handbook of statistics - 2020 Sri Sathya Sai District (PDF).
