= Guntakal revenue division =

Revenue division in Anantapur district, Andhra Pradesh, India

- revenue division in Anantapur district
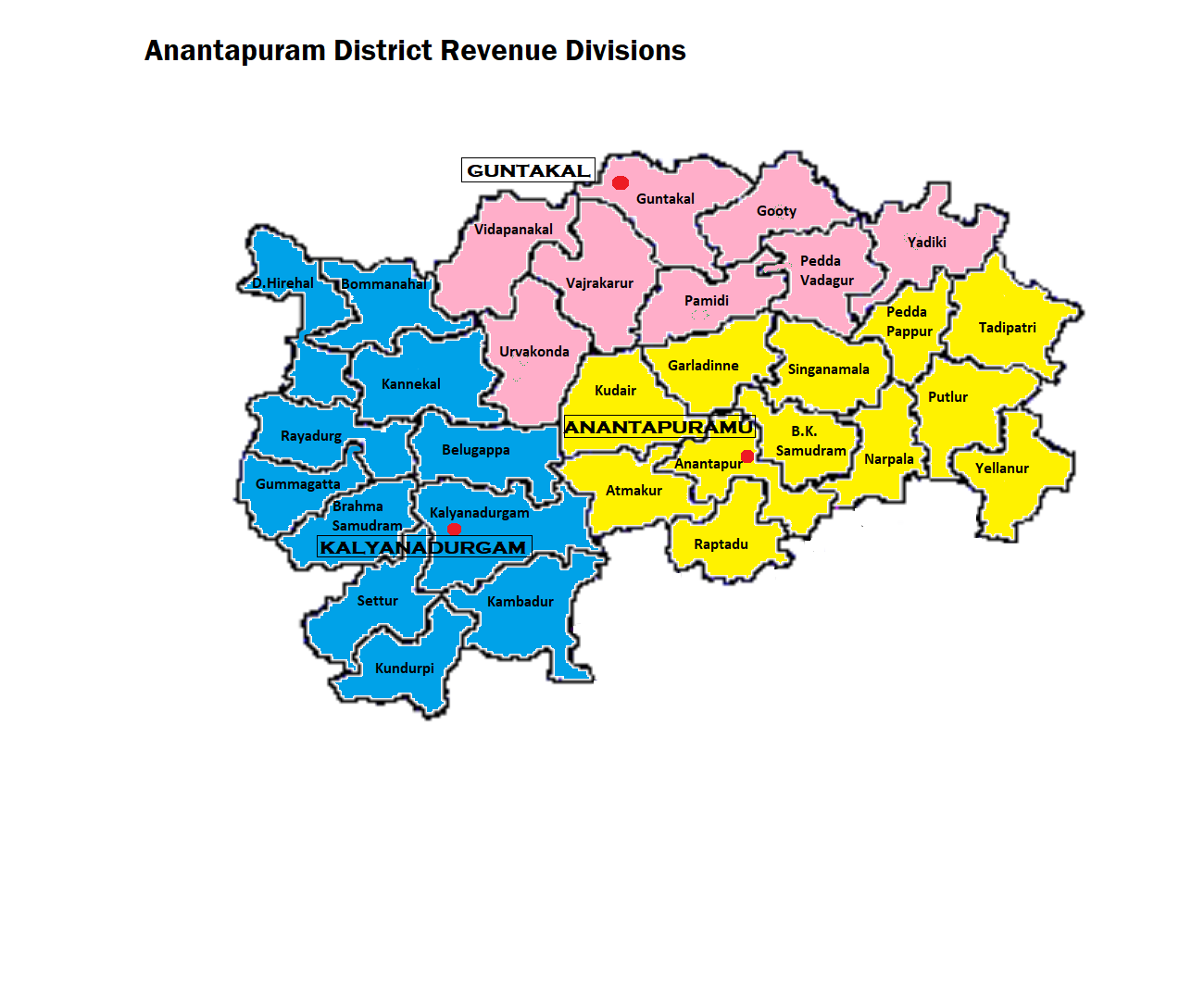
- Guntakal revenue division in Anantapur district
- Country: India
- State: Andhra Pradesh
- District: Anantapur
- Formed: 4 April 2022
- Founder: Government of Andhra Pradesh
- Headquarters: Guntakal
- Time zone: UTC+05:30 (IST)

Guntakal revenue division is an administrative division in the Anantapur district of the Indian state of Andhra Pradesh. This division headquarters is located at Guntakal. It is one of the three revenue divisions in the district and comprises eight mandals. It was formed on 4 April 2022.

== Administration ==
The revenue division comprises eight mandals: Guntakal, Gooty, Pamidi, Peddavaduguru, Uravakonda, Vajrakarur, Vidapanakallu and Yadiki.
