= Rayadurg–Tumkur section =

Overview
- Status: Operational
- Owner: Indian Railways
- Locale: Andhra Pradesh, Karnataka
- Termini: Rayadurg Junction; Tumkur

Service
- Operator(s): South Western Railway zone

Technical
- Line length: 207.00 km (128.62 mi)
- Track gauge: 5 ft 6 in (1,676 mm) broad gauge
- Electrification: Ongoing
- Operating speed: 100 km/h

Rayadurg–Tumkur section is an ongoing broad-gauge railway line project in the Indian states of Andhra Pradesh and Karnataka. It connects Rayadurg in Andhra Pradesh with Tumkur in Karnataka.

== History ==
The foundation stone for this project was laid in October 2011 with an outlay of 857.31 crores.

== Jurisdiction ==
This project falls under the jurisdiction of both Andhra Pradesh and Karnataka states with a distance of 94 km and 113 km. This line falls under the jurisdiction of Hubli railway division of the South Western Railway Zone.

== Status ==
As of now 63 km of track is operational. There is a single daily passenger service from Tirupati to Kadiri Devarapalli.

== Route ==
This line passes through Kalyandurg, Kadiridevarapalli, Doddahalli, Pavagada, Madakasira, Medigeshi, Madhugiri, Koratagere Oorukere and ends at Tumkur.
