= Vajrakarur =

- town
- Nickname: Diamond hub
- Interactive map of Vajrakarur
- Location in Andhra Pradesh, India
- Coordinates: 15.0167°N 77.3833°E
- Country: India
- State: Andhra Pradesh
- District: Anantapur
- Talukas: Vajrakarur
- Elevation: 447 m (1,467 ft)

Population (2001)
  - Total: 7,925
  - Rank: 4

Languages
  - Official: Telugu
- Time zone: UTC+5:30 (IST)
- Postal code: 515832
- Vehicle registration: AP 02

Vajrakarur is a village in Anantapur district of the Indian state of Andhra Pradesh. It is the mandal headquarters of Vajrakarur mandal in Anantapur revenue division.

This village was under the rule of Pemmasani Nayaks. A fort was constructed by Pemmasani Timma Naidu who had developed this village significantly and attracted many visitors during Vijayanagar times.

== Geography ==
It is located at15.0167°N 77.3833°E. It has an average elevation of 447 metres (1469 ft). This is a major panchayati with a population of 7482.

== Demographics ==
According to Indian census, 2001, the demographic details of Vajrakarur mandal is as follows:

- Total Population: 7482
- Male Population: 3815 and Female Population: 3667

== Panchayats ==
The following is the list of village panchayats in Vajrakarur mandal. 1. Vajrakarur 2. Ganjikunta 3. Thatrakal 4. NNP Thanda 5. VPP Thanda 6. Venkatam palli 7. J Rampuram 8. Kamalapadu 9. Gulyapalyam 10. Konakondla 11. Chayapuram 12. Hothur 13. Pyapily 14. PC kotha kota 15. Kadamalakunta 16. Ragulapadu 17. Pottipadu 18. Pandikunta 18.Bodisanipalli Thanda
