= Katamdevara kote =

Village in Chitradurga District, India

Katamdevara Kote otherwise Katamdevarakote is a small village in Challakere Taluk, Chitradurga District of India. It is located at the border of Karnataka and Andhra Pradesh. The distance from the nearest town is 33 kilometers away from Challakere town towards Kalyanadurga town, 32 kilometers from Kalyanadurga town, and 31 kilometers from Rayadurgam Town.

Its population in 2011 was 1,781. The village contains a Government Higher Primary School, a Primary Health Center, the Anganawadi Center and a private school (Sarvodaya Lower/Higher Primary school)..

The main crops are jowar (sorghum), onion, banana, and groundnut.

Here are many Hindu temples with the famous Anjineya temple, Siva Temple, Basavanna Temple, Palanayaka Temple, Kadaramma Temple, and more temples are under construction.

This village has a ritual pond with a surface area of 1 square kiometer, with a Siva temple located above the pond retaining wall.
