= Amilineni Surendra Babu =

Indian politician

Member of Legislative Assembly Andhra Pradesh
- Incumbent
- Assumed office 2024
- Preceded by: K. V. Ushashri Charan
- Constituency: Kalyandurg

Personal details
- Born: 1970 (age 55–56)
- Party: Telugu Desam Party

Amilineni Surendra Babu (born 1970) is an Indian politician from Andhra Pradesh. He is an MLA from Kalyandurg Assembly constituency in Anantapur district. He represents Telugu Desam Party. He won the 2024 Andhra Pradesh Legislative Assembly election where TDP had an alliance with BJP and Jana Sena Party.

== Early life and education ==
Babu is from Kalyandurg, Anantapur district. His late father was Amilineni Venkatappa. He is a businessman and his wife is a homemaker. He studied only till Class 10. He completed his secondary school certificate examination in 1983. He declared assets worth Rs.189 crore in his affidavit to the Election Commission of India.

== Political career ==
Babu won the 2024 Andhra Pradesh Legislative Assembly election from Kalyandurg Assembly constituency representing Telugu Desam Party. He polled 118,878 votes and defeated his nearest rival, Talari Rangaiah of YSR Congress Party, by a margin of 37,734 votes. After getting elected, he promised the local people that he would complete the Bhairavani Tippa irrigation project in two years.
