= Unnam Hanumantharaya Chowdary =

Indian politician

Member of the Andhra Pradesh Legislative Assembly
- Incumbent
- Assumed office 2014 – 2019
- Preceded by: B. Raghu Veera Reddy
- Succeeded by: Kallam Udhav Kumar
- Constituency: Kalyandurg

Personal details
- Born: 23 July Yerrampalli, Kalyandurg mandal, Andhra Pradesh, India
- Died: 21 March 2026 Anantapur, Andhra Pradesh, India
- Citizenship: Indian
- Party: Telugu Desam Party
- Spouse: Lakshmi Devi
- Children: Viresh Chowdary, Maruti Chowdary, Udayabhaskar Chowdary
- Parent: Veeranna
- Profession: Politician

Unnam Hanumantharaya Chowdary was an Indian politician from Andhra Pradesh. He served as a Member of the Andhra Pradesh Legislative Assembly representing the Kalyandurg constituency in 2014.

== Political career ==
Unnam Hanumantharaya Chowdary entered politics through the Telugu Desam Party and served in various positions including Sarpanch, Mandal Parishad President, Single Window President, Chairman of Markfed from 28 September 1998 to 28 March 2004, Anantapur district TDP President from 2000 to 2010, and President of the TDP State Rythu Wing. He subsequently contested and won as an MLA for the first time from the Kalyandurg constituency representing the TDP in the 2014 Andhra Pradesh Legislative Assembly elections. He later served as the vice president of TDP in the state.

== Death ==
Hanumantharaya Chowdary died on 21 March 2026 while undergoing treatment for health complications at a hospital in Anantapur.
