= K. V. Ushashri Charan =

Indian politician

Minister of Women and Child Welfare; Disabled and Senior Citizen Welfare Government of Andhra Pradesh
- In office 11 April 2022 – 4 June 2024
- Governor: Biswabhusan Harichandan; S. Abdul Nazeer
- Chief Minister: Y. S. Jagan Mohan Reddy
- Preceded by: Taneti Vanitha
- Succeeded by: Gummadi Sandhya Rani (as Minister of Women and Child Welfare); Dola Sree Bala Veeranjaneya Swamy (as Minister of Disabled and Senior Citizen Welfare)

Member of Legislative Assembly, Andhra Pradesh
- In office 2019–2024
- Preceded by: Vunnam Hanumantharaya Chowdary
- Succeeded by: Amilineni Surendra Babu
- Constituency: Kalyandurg

Personal details
- Born: 16 July 1976 (age 49) Rayadurgam, Andhra Pradesh
- Party: YSR Congress Party (since 2014)
- Other political affiliations: Telugu Desam Party (until 2014)
- Spouse: Sri Charan Reddy
- Children: 2
- Parent(s): Kuruba Virupakshappa; K. V. Ratnamma
- Occupation: Politician

K. V. Ushashri Charan (16 July 1976) is the former cabinet minister from Andhra Pradesh, India. She is a member of the YSR Congress party and former MLA of Kalyandurg Assembly constituency in Anantapur district.

== Early life and education ==
Ushashri Charan is born in Rayadurgam in 1976. Her parents are K. V. Ratnamma and Dr. Kuruba Virupakshappa. She is married to Charan Reddy and has a daughter, Jayana Shricharan, and son, Divijith Shricharan. After completing her B.Sc. in life sciences, she did her post-graduation in Environmental Science. She is currently pursuing her Ph.D. from SK University on Atmospheric Science and Global Warming.

== Career ==
Earlier, she worked as Telugu Desam Party state general secretary of Women's wing. In December 2014, she resigned from this post and joined YSR Congress Party. In 2019 assembly elections she contested from Kalyandurg, and won as MLA defeating Uma Maheshwar Naidu of TDP party with 19896 majority. In April 2022, during Cabinet reshuffle she was appointed Minister for women, children, differently-abled individuals, and senior citizen welfare.
