= Poliki =

- Interactive map of Poliki
- Location in Andhra Pradesh, India
- Coordinates: 15°04′15″N 77°17′38″E
- Country: India
- State: Andhra Pradesh
- Elevation: 456 m (1,496 ft)

Languages
  - Official: Telugu
- Time zone: UTC+5:30 (IST)
- PIN: 515842

Poliki is an Indian Village located in Anantapur district of Andhra Pradesh, India.

== Geography ==
Poliki is a village in Vidapanakal Mandal in Anantapur District of Andhra Pradesh State, India. It belongs to Rayalaseema region.
