= Kasepalli =

Village in Andhra Pradesh, India

Coordinates: 15.050°N 77.643°E

Kasepalli is a village in the Peddavadugur mandal in Anantapur District of Andhra Pradesh, India.

== Location ==
Kasepalli is located 48 kilometres (30 mi) north of Anantapur and 321 kilometres (199 mi) from the state capital of Amaravathi.

== Demographics ==
The language of Kasepalli is Telugu.

== Gallery ==
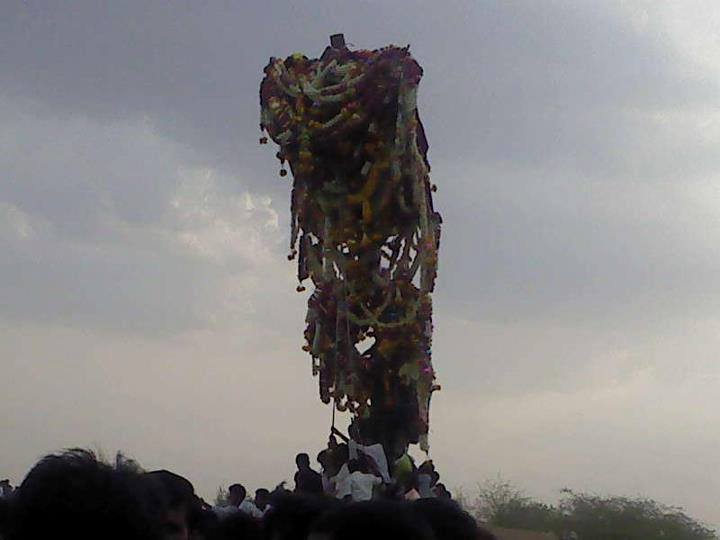
Bandisila Jathara

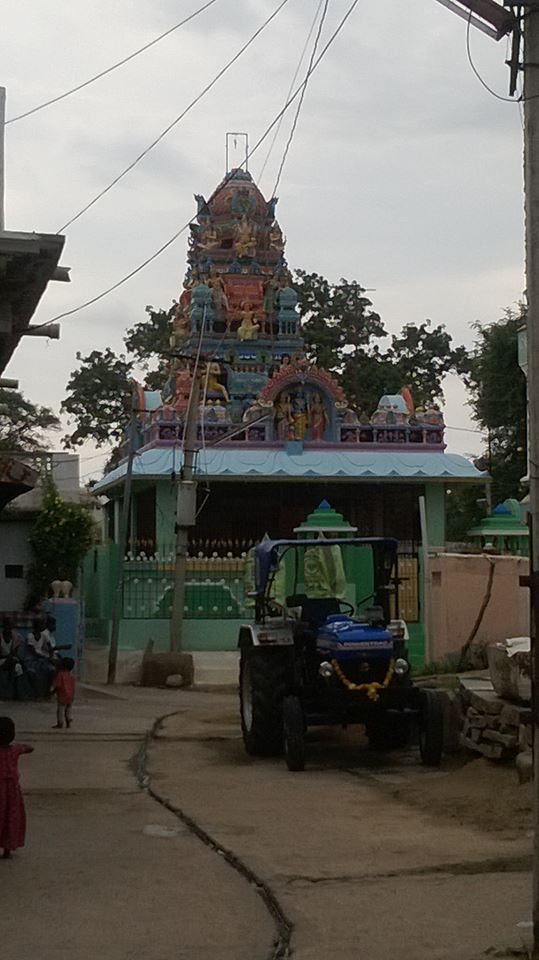
Temple of Rama in Kasepalli

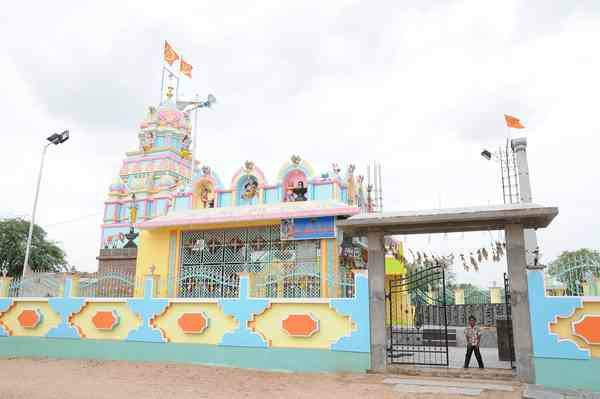
Temple of Shiva in Kasepalli
