= Malyam =

- Village
- Interactive map of Malyam
- Location in Andhra Pradesh, India Malyam (India)
- Coordinates: 14°48′N 77°06′E
- Country: India
- State: Andhra Pradesh

Languages
  - Official: Telugu
- Time zone: UTC+5:30 (IST)
- Vehicle registration: AP

Malyam is a small village, Kanekal Mandal, Anantapur District in Andhra Pradesh, India.
