= Uravakonda =

- Census Town
- Location in Andhra Pradesh, India
- Coordinates: 14.95°N 77.27°E
- Country: India
- State: Andhra Pradesh
- District: Anantapur

Area
  - Total: 30.28 km^{2} (11.69 sq mi)
- Elevation: 459 m (1,506 ft)

Population (2017)
  - Total: 80,201
  - Density: 2,649/km^{2} (6,860/sq mi)

Languages
  - Official: Telugu
- Time zone: UTC+5:30 (IST)
- Postal code: 515812
- Vehicle registration: AP

Uravakonda is a census town in Anantapur district of the Indian state of Andhra Pradesh. It is the headquarters of Uravakonda mandal in Guntakal revenue division. The town is a constituent of urban agglomeration.

Uravakonda was a once a village which Govindacharya Uravakonda acquired from the British. He gradually developed it as town: building the famous clock tower at the heart of the town.

It was mentioned as 'part of Boviseema' in the inscriptions from the 10th century to the 16th century on stone slabs at some villages ruled by Vijayanagara Empire kings.

== Geography ==
Uravakonda is located at 14.95°N 77.27°E. It has an average elevation of 459 metres (1505 feet), 55 km to Anantapuram District.

== Demographics ==
As of 2001 India census, Uravakonda had a population of 41,865. Males constitute 51% of the population and females 49%. Uravakonda has an average literacy rate of 61%, higher than the national average of 59.5%: male literacy is 71%, and female literacy is 50%. In Uravakonda, 12% of the population is under 6 years of age. Nearest town is Guntakal.

Uravakonda is well connected to district headquarters Anantapur (52 km) and to other close by cities Bellary (Karnataka, 55 km), Guntakal 32km.

== Education ==
The primary and secondary school education is imparted by government, aided and private schools, under the School Education Department of the state. The media of instruction followed by different schools are English, Telugu, Urdu, and Hindi.

== See also ==
- List of census towns in Andhra Pradesh
