= Penna Ahobilam =

- place
- Interactive map of Penna Ahobilam
- Penna Ahobilam, Anantapur district, Andhra Pradesh
- Coordinates: 14.8606°N 77.3059°E
- Country: India
- State: Andhra Pradesh
- District: Anantapur
- Elevation: 425.38 m (1,395.6 ft)

Population (2011)
  - Total: 66
  - Rank: 90

Languages
  - Official: Telugu
- Time zone: UTC+5:30 (IST)

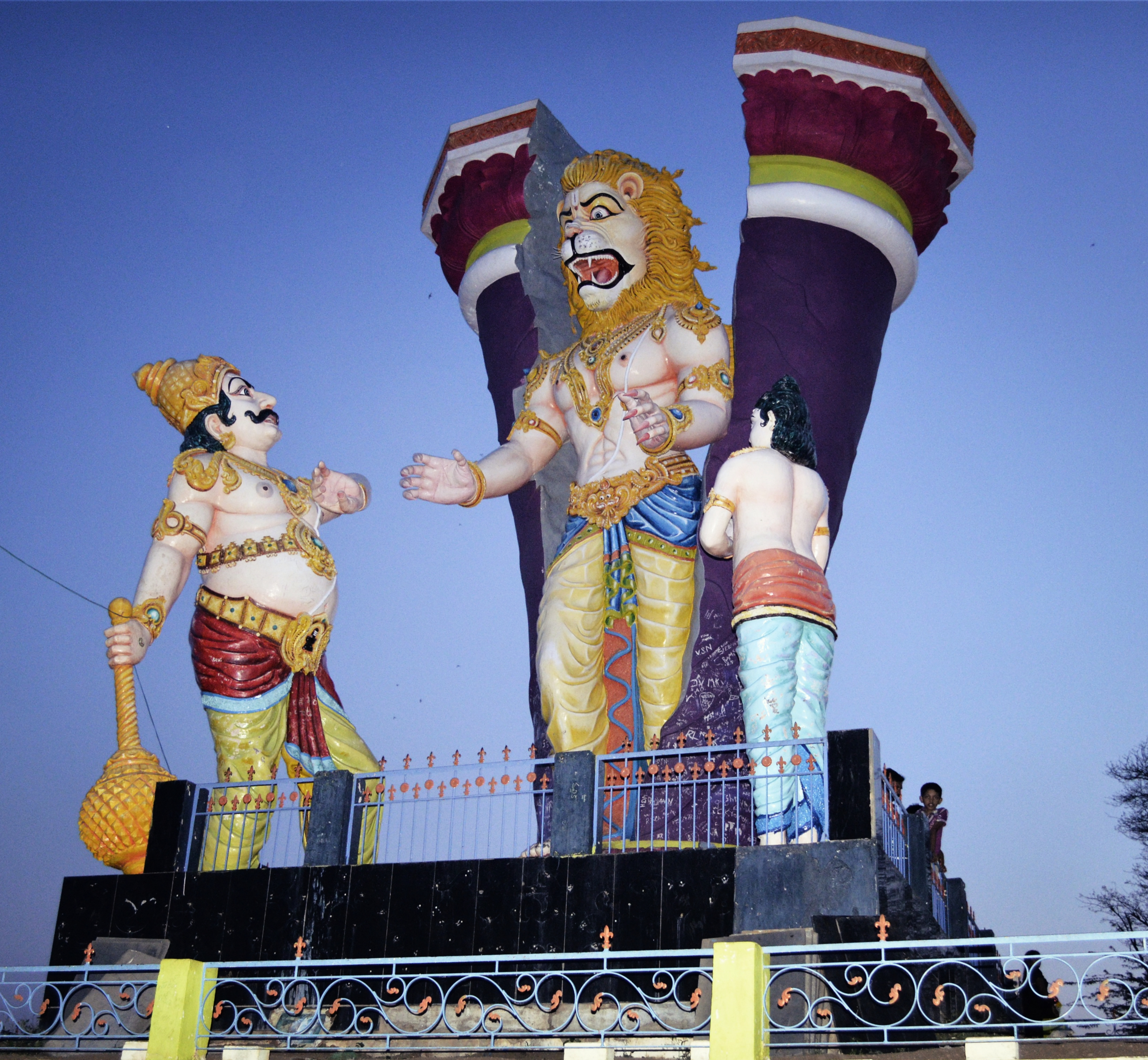
Penna Ahobilam, Uravakonda, Anantapur

Penna Ahobilam a is place near Anantapuramu, Andhra Pradesh, India, 12 km from Uravakonda and 36 km from Anantapur. It is well-linked by road with frequent bus services.

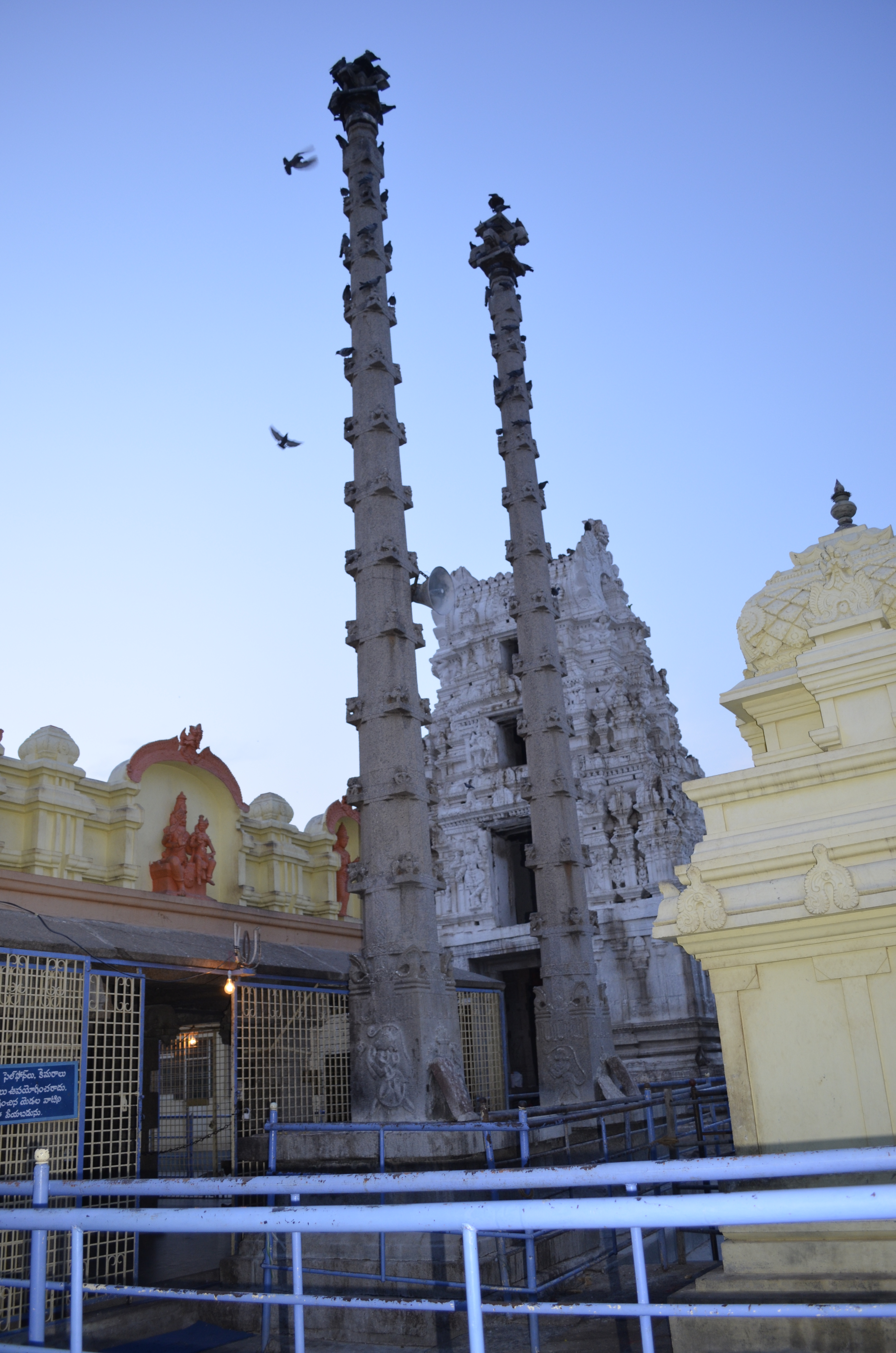
Penna Ahobilam, Lord Lakshmi Narasimha Swamy, Temple
