= Venkatampalle =

Venkatampalle Venkatam-palli
- village
- Interactive map of Venkatampalle
- Location in Andhra Pradesh, India Venkatampalle (India)
- Coordinates: 14°54′N 77°24′E
- Country: India
- State: Andhra Pradesh
- District: Anantapur
- Talukas: Vijrakarur

Population (2001)
  - Total: 2,782

Languages
  - Official: Telugu
- Time zone: UTC+5:30 (IST)
- PIN: 515 832
- Sex ratio: 1.07 ♂/♀

Venkatampalle is a village in Vajrakarur mandal in Anantapur district in the Indian state of Andhra Pradesh. Rajampet is the nearest town to Utukuru Venkatampalle As of 2001 it had a population of 2,782 in 501 households.

== Geography ==
Venkatampalli is noted for diamonds. This is a small village with a population of 1100. This village is 20 km (12 mi) from Uravakonda and 25 km (16 mi) from Guntakal. There is a dense forest around 8,000 acres (32 km^{2}) to the east of this village. Many people visit the forest in search of diamonds. In the 1990s, an Australian company took land to seek diamonds.

Sri Jarutla Ramaligeswara Swami temple is famous which is 5 km from Venkatampalli.

== Demographics ==
According to Indian census, 2001, the demographic details of Venkatampalle village is as follows:

- Total Population: 2,782 in 501 Households.
- Male Population: 1,440 and Female Population: 1,342
- Children Under 6-years of age: 454 (Boys - 227 and Girls - 227
- Total Literates: 909

== History ==
This village originated in the 1890s with a couple of families. Some tribes joined the village after ten years. The village was divided into three parts after some years (Venkatampalli, VPC Thanda, VPP Thanda).

Earlier this panchayat consisted of Venkatampalli, VPC Thanda and VPP Thanda. In 1997 it was divided into two panchayats: Venkatampalli and VPP Thanda.

List of sarpanch's for Venkatampalli from 1997:

- 1. Vijaya simha (1997–2002)
- 2. Badhru Naik (2002–2007)
- 3. Arjun (2007 to 2013)
- 4. Pothula Rathnamma (2013 to )
