= Ganjikunta =

- Village
- Interactive map of Ganjikunta
- Location in Andhra Pradesh, India Ganjikunta (India)
- Coordinates: 14.996816°N 77.375400°E
- Country: India
- State: Andhra Pradesh
- District: Anantapur
- Talukas: Vajrakarur

Population (2011)
  - Total: 1,695

Languages
  - Official: Telugu
- Time zone: UTC+5:30 (IST)

Ganjikunta is a village in the Vijrakarur mandal of Anantapur district in Andhra Pradesh, India. The village represents the remains of the town of Ganjikunta which burnt down in the 1750s.

== Demographics ==
As of 2011 census, the village had a population of 1,695. The total population constitutes 843 males and 852 females —a sex ratio of 1011 females per 1000 males. 196 children are in the age group of 0–6 years, of which 96 are boys and 100 are girls —a ratio of 1042 per 1000. The average literacy rate stands at 60.97% with 914 literates, significantly lower than the state average of 67.41%.
