= Rayadurg Junction railway station =

Railway station in Andhra Pradesh, India

Rayadurgam Junction railway station

General information
- Location: Rayadurgam, Anantapur district, Andhra Pradesh; India
- Coordinates: 14.7052°N 76.8571°E
- System: Express train and Passenger train station
- Owner: Indian Railways
- Operator: South Western Railway zone
- Line: Rayadurgam-Tumkur section
- Platforms: 2 (Planning Upto 10 Platforms)

Construction
- Structure type: On-ground
- Parking: available
- Accessible: Disabled access

Other information
- Status: Functional
- Station code: RDG
- Fare zone: South Western Railway zone
Location
- Location within Andhra Pradesh Location within India

Rayadurgam Junction railway station is the primary railway station serving Rayadurgam town in the Indian state of Andhra Pradesh. The station comes under the jurisdiction of Hubli railway division of South Western Railway zone. A new railway line connecting with Kalyandurg of Anantapur district was commissioned recently. It will be eventually extended to Tumkur.
