= Guntakal =

Guntakal Guntakallu
- Town
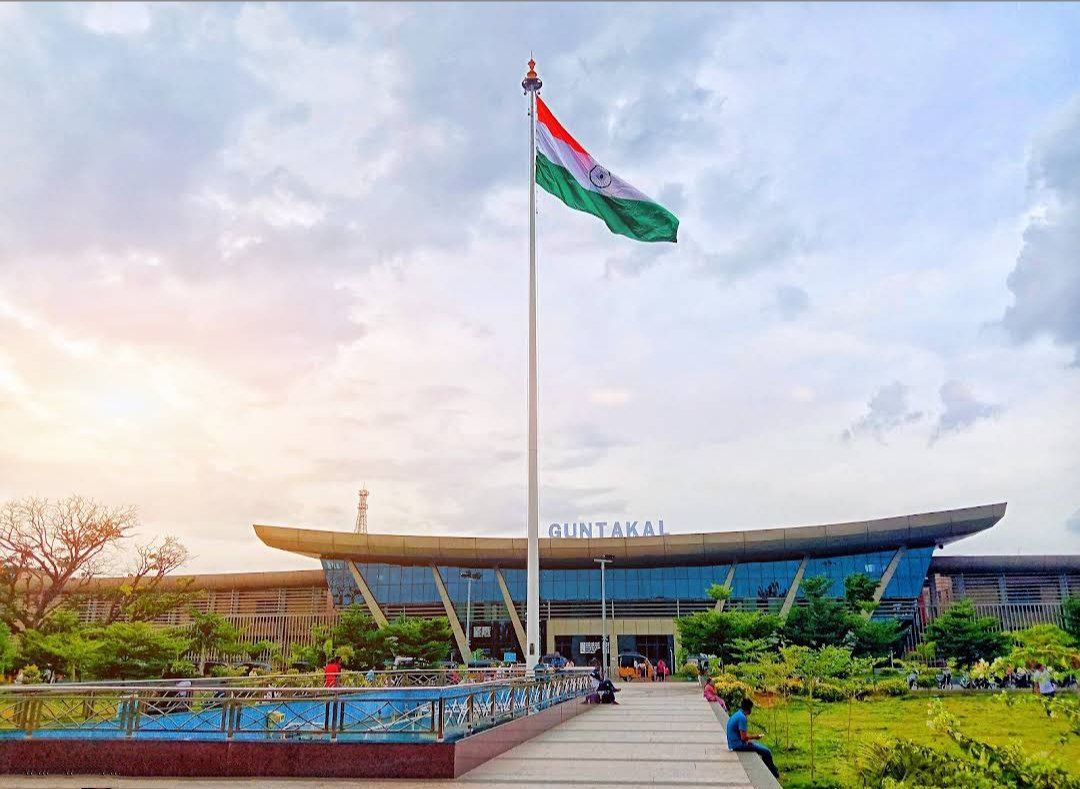
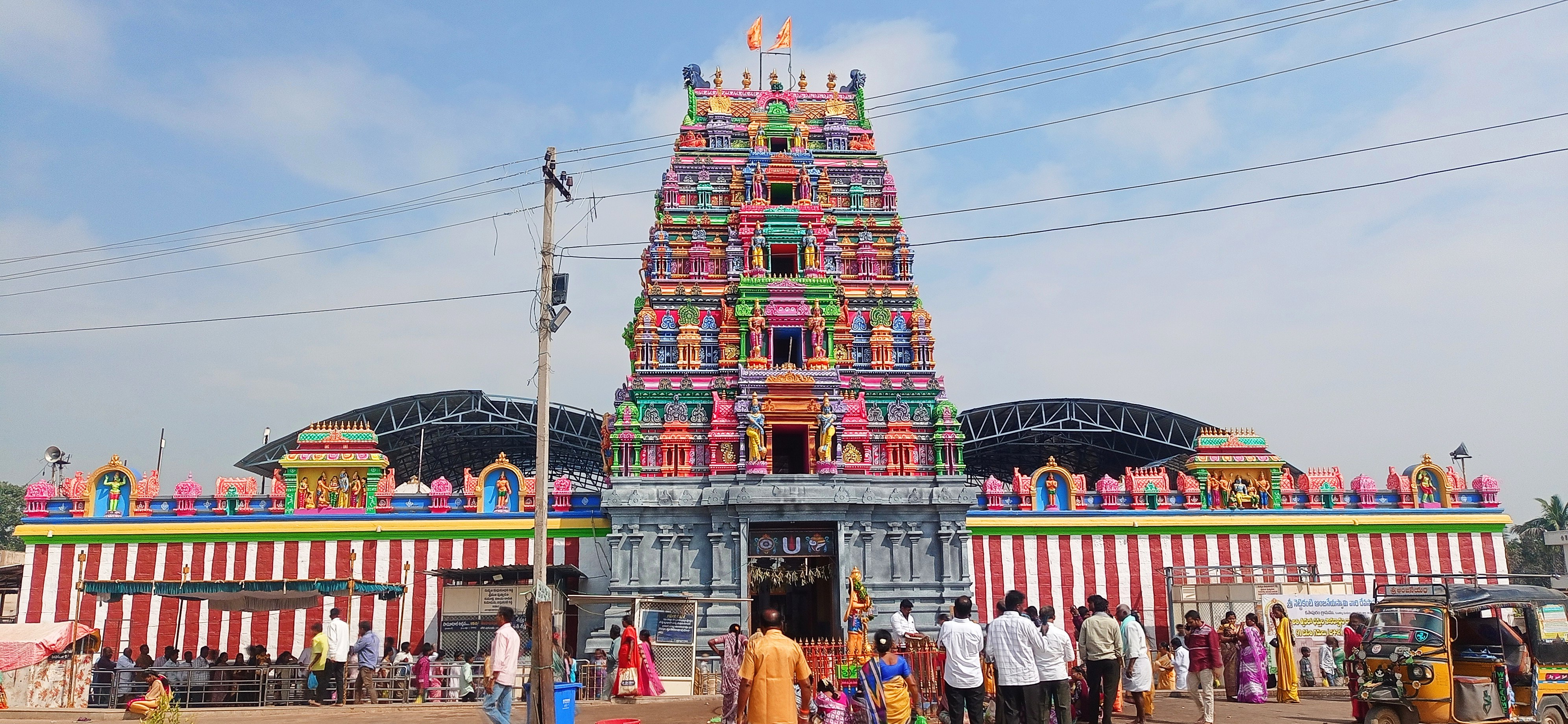
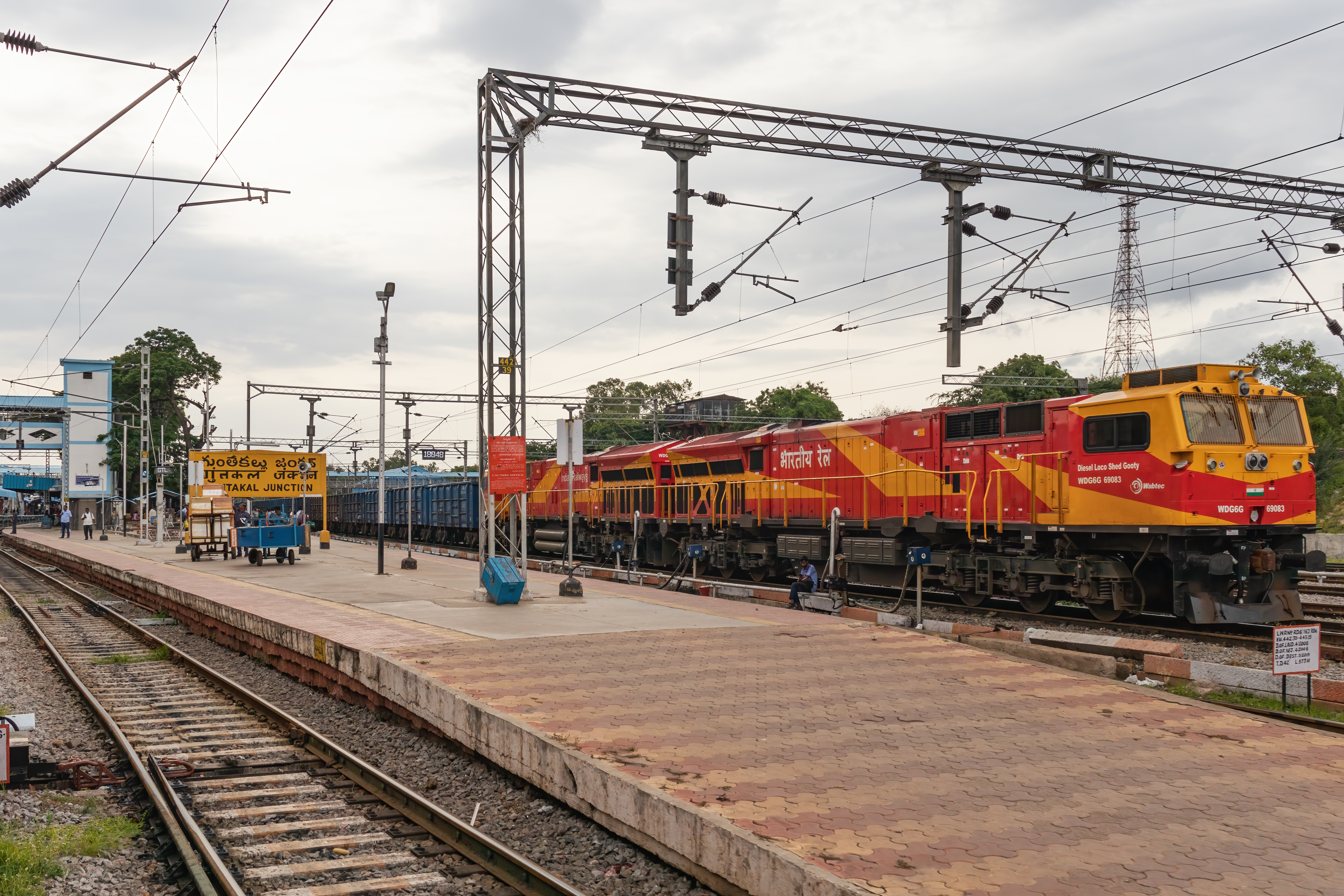
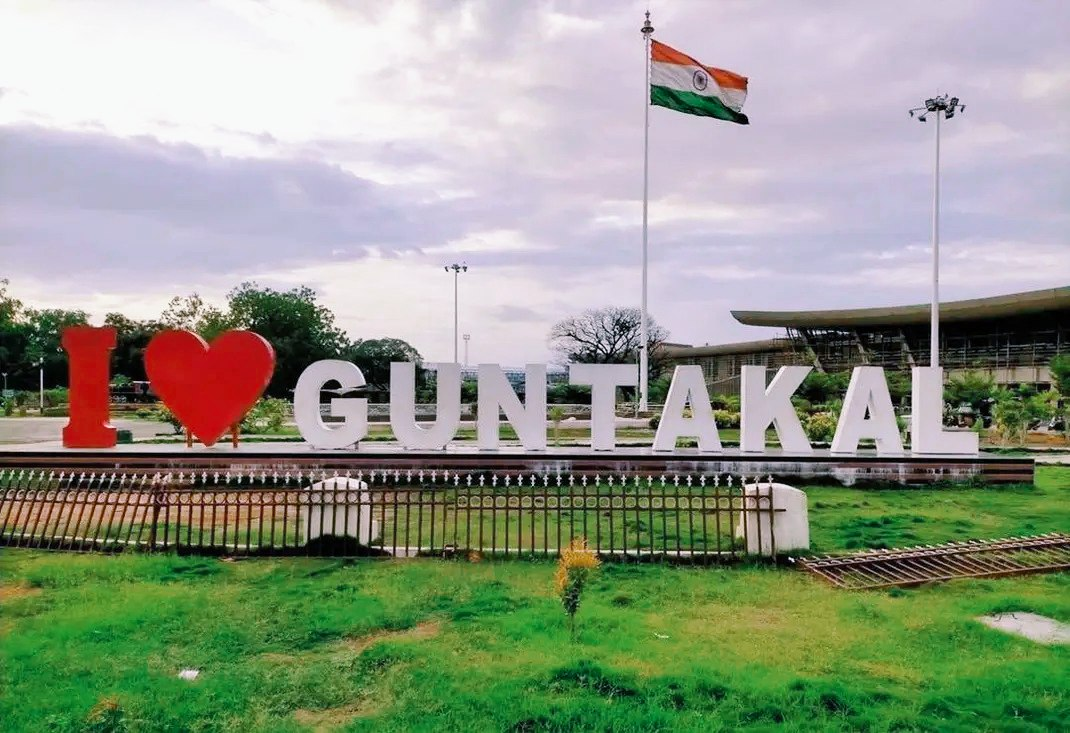
- 1.Guntakal Railway Station 2. Nettikanti Anjaneya swamy temple

- Location in Andhra Pradesh, India
- Coordinates: 15.17°N 77.38°E
- Country: India
- State: Andhra Pradesh
- District: Anantapur

Government
  - Type: Municipal Corporation
  - Body: Guntakal Municipal Corporation

Area
  - Total: 51.90 km^{2} (20.04 sq mi)
- Elevation: 432 m (1,417 ft)

Population (2011)
  - Total: 164,270
  - Rank: 26
  - Density: 3,165/km^{2} (8,198/sq mi)

Languages
  - Official: Telugu
- Time zone: UTC+5:30 (IST)
- PIN: 515801
- Telephone code: +91–8552
- Vehicle registration: AP–02
- Assembly constituency: Guntakal
- Website: guntakal.cdma.ap.gov.in

Guntakal, natively known as Guntakallu, is a town in Anantapur district of the Indian state of Andhra Pradesh. It is the headquarters of Guntakal revenue division and the mandal headquarters of Guntakal mandal. It is also the headquarters of the Guntakal Railway Division in South Coast Railway (SCoR). Guntakal Railway Station is a vital junction for express passenger trains, logistics transport and freight transport. Guntakal has a famous pilgrimage site Sri Nettikanti Anjaneya Swamy Temple in Kasapuram is famous for its "one-eyed" deity and the belief that the Lord's divine gaze looks directly at his devotees.

== Geography ==
Guntakal is located at 15.17°N 77.38°E. It has an average elevation of 432 metres (1,417 ft).

== Demographics ==
As per provisional data of 2011 census, Guntakal municipality had a population of 126,479, out of which males were 62,695 and females were 63,784. The literacy rate was 75.70 per cent. Telugu is the official and widely spoken language. Urdu and Kannada are also spoken widely.

== Transport ==
The Andhra Pradesh State Road Transport Corporation operates bus services from Guntakal bus station.Guntakal is well connected to Bellary with 53Kms and Has Daily buses of APSRTC and KSRTC buses. The National Highway 67 passes through the town. State Highway 26 connects Guntakal with Uravakonda.

=== Railways ===
Guntakal railway station is a 5-point junction and divisional headquarters since 1953 and is one of the most profitable divisions in Indian Railways. It has lines branching out to Bangalore, Chennai, Mumbai, Vasco da Gama, Hyderabad, and Vijayawada. It is the second largest division in S.Co.R in route km. It is an 'A' category railway station and numerous trains pass through it daily. Starting from Rajadhani express to Duronto express, all the trains stop at Guntakal and it is a serving station for Bellary.

== Education ==
The primary and secondary school education is imparted by the government, aided and private schools, under the School Education Department of the state.. Railway High School and SJP Government School are both government schools. KC Narayana, Rotary, Prathibha Vikas and St. Peters are few private schools.

- Sri Adi Siva Sadguru alli saheb sivaryula Ayurvedic Medical College and research centre Guntakal.
- Sri Padmavathi College of Nursing, Guntakal.

== Places to Visit ==
- Sri Nettikanti Anjaneya swamy Temple: Located 5 km from Guntakal town. "Nettikanti" Means the Anjaneya Swamy Divine Stare right eye is believed to gaze straight at the devotee, a feature thought to remove fear, destroy negative energies, and bless worshippers with confidence and strength. this temple attracts devotees not only from the surrounding villages but also from Karnataka during the month of Shravan.Temple it is thronged with devotees every Saturday and Tuesday. Kashi Vishweshwara Swamy Temple is located in a nearby hill.
- Hazarat Wali Mastan Dargah: Every year, a large number of devotees from states like Karnataka and Maharashtra come here to worship the Lord for the Urs festival held here 15 days after Muharram.
- Gooty Fort: Gooty Fort is majestically located at a distance of 31kms from Guntakal at a height of 300mts on a hill. It is one of the oldest hill forts in A.P. Built during the Vijayanagara era, the fort is uniquely built in the shape of a shell with 15 main doors and is significant for its water resources available at such a height.

== See also ==
- List of cities in Andhra Pradesh by population
- List of municipalities in Andhra Pradesh
