= Kalyandurg Assembly constituency =

Constituency of the Andhra Pradesh Legislative Assembly, India

Coordinates: 14.56°N 77.11°E

Kalyandurg
- Constituency No. 154 for the Andhra Pradesh Legislative Assembly
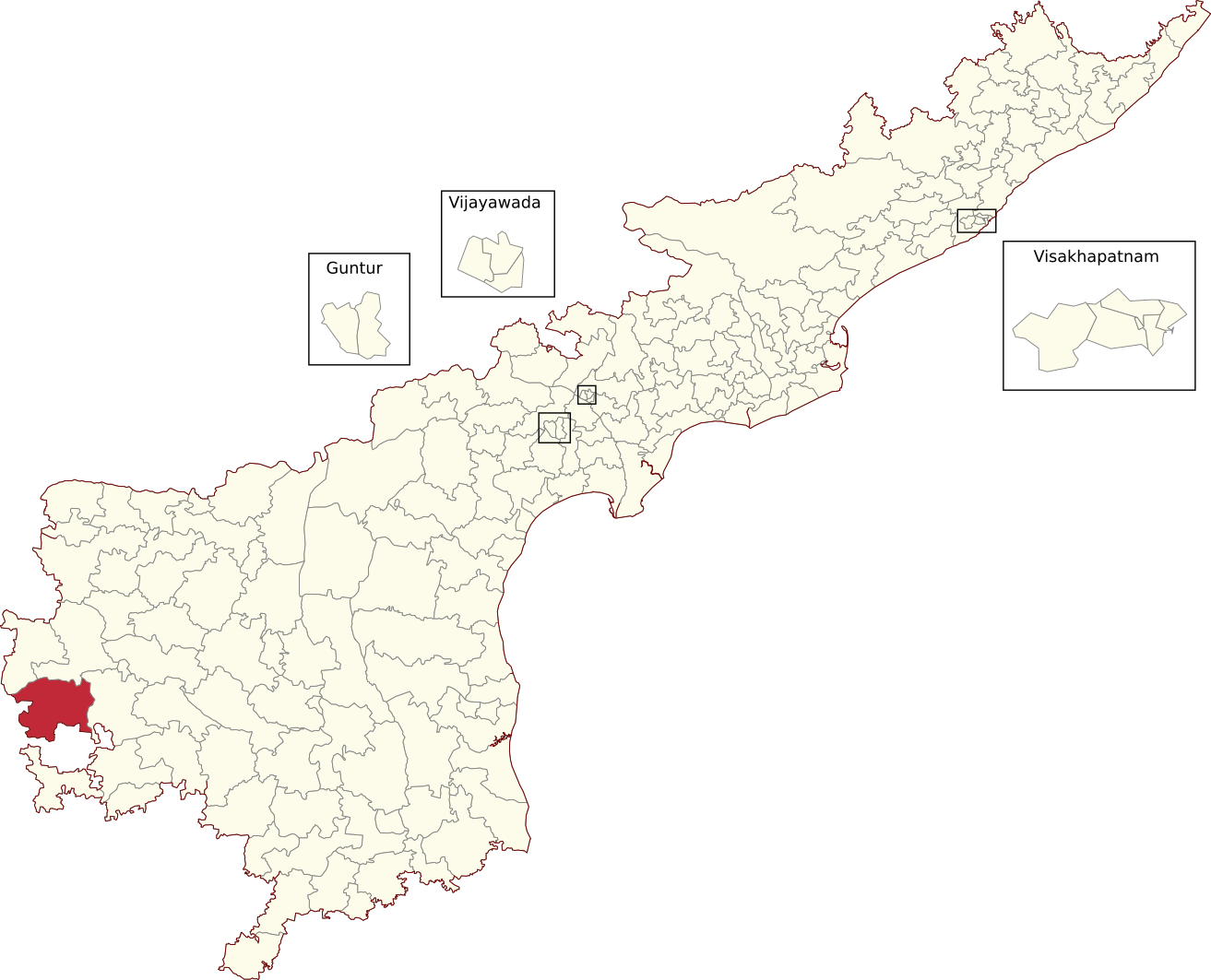
- Location of Kalyandurg Assembly constituency within Andhra Pradesh

Constituency details
- Country: India
- Region: South India
- State: Andhra Pradesh
- District: Anantapur
- Lok Sabha constituency: Anantapur
- Established: 1951
- Total electors: 219,591
- Reservation: None

Member of Legislative Assembly
- 16th Andhra Pradesh Legislative Assembly
- Incumbent Amilineni Surendra Babu
- Party: TDP
- Alliance: NDA
- Elected year: 2024

Kalyandurg Assembly constituency is a constituency in Anantapur district of Andhra Pradesh that elects representatives to the Andhra Pradesh Legislative Assembly in India. It is one of the seven assembly segments of the constituencies in Anantapur Lok Sabha constituency.

Amilineni Surendra Babu is the current MLA of the constituency, having won the 2024 Andhra Pradesh Legislative Assembly election from Telugu Desam Party. As of 2019, there are a total of 219,591 electors in the constituency. The constituency was established in 1951, as per the Delimitation Orders (1951).

== Mandals ==
Mandal
Brahmsamudram
Kalyandurg
Settur
Kundrupi
Kambdur

== Members of the Legislative Assembly ==
Year	Member	Political party
1952	Narayanappa Sanda	Indian National Congress
1967	T.C. Mareppa	Independent
1972	M. Lakshmi Devi	Indian National Congress
1978	Hindi Narasappa	Janata Party
1983	T. C. Mareppa	Telugu Desam Party
1985	Pakeerappa	Communist Party of India
1989	M. Lakshmi Devi	Indian National Congress
1994	B C Govindappa	Telugu Desam Party
1999	A Saradamba	Telugu Desam Party
2004	B C Govindappa	Telugu Desam Party
2009	Raghuveera Reddy	Indian National Congress
2014	U Hanumantaraya Chowdary	Telugu Desam Party
2019	K. V. Ushashri Charan	YSR Congress Party
2024	Amilineni Surendra Babu	Telugu Desam Party

== Election results ==
=== 1952 ===
1952 Madras Legislative Assembly election: Kalyandrug
Party	Candidate	Votes	%	±%
INC	Narayanappa Sanda	28,118	20.75%	20.75%
CPI	B.Yeniswamy	19,642	14.49%	
Independent	B.Rananappa Setty	16,278	12.01%	
INC	Santhappa	16,233	11.98%	11.98%
Independent	Nagi Reddy Vakil	15,427	11.38%	
KMPP	K.H.Krishnamoorthy Rao	10,567	7.80%	
Socialist Party (India)	G.C.Venkanna	8,380	6.18%	
Independent	Muthulur Ramappa	8,339	6.15%	
KMPP	B.Anjappa	7,044	5.20%	
Independent	Nagappa	5,498	4.06%	
Margin of victory		8,476	6.25%	
Turnout		1,35,526	91.18%	
Registered electors		1,48,629		
INC win (new seat)				

=== 2004 ===
2004 Andhra Pradesh Legislative Assembly election: Kalyandurg
Party	Candidate	Votes	%	±%
TDP	B C Govindappa	76,363	51.86	+3.07
INC	Sugepalli Umadevi	66,711	45.29	+8.91
Majority		9,652	6.55	
Turnout		147,313	74.98	+7.80
TDP hold		Swing		

=== 2009 ===
2009 Andhra Pradesh Legislative Assembly election: Kalyandurg
Party	Candidate	Votes	%	±%
INC	Neelakanthapuram Raghuveera Reddy	69,614	47.58	+2.29
TDP	Vunnam Hanumantharaya Chowdary	65,226	44.58	−7.26
PRP	Market Ramana	7,342	5.02	
Majority		4,388	3.00	
Turnout		146,301	82.31	+7.33
INC gain from TDP		Swing		

=== 2014 ===
2014 Andhra Pradesh Legislative Assembly election: Kalyandurg
Party	Candidate	Votes	%	±%
TDP	Vunnam Hanumantharaya Chowdary	91,981	54.73	
YSRCP	Boya Thippe Swamy	69,662	41.45	
Majority		22,319	13.28	
Turnout		168,051	85.90	+3.59
TDP gain from INC		Swing		

=== 2019 ===
2019 Andhra Pradesh Legislative Assembly election: Kalyandurg
Party	Candidate	Votes	%	±%
YSRCP	K. V. Ushashri Charan	88,051	46.14%	
TDP	Umamaheswara Naidu Madineni	68,155	35.71%	
INC	Raghuveera Reddy	28,883	15.13%	
JSP	Rahul Karanam	1,554	0.81%	
BJP	Muppuri Devaraj	794	0.42%	
Majority		19,896	10.43%	
Turnout		190,841	85.9086.9	+1%
YSRCP gain from TDP		Swing		

=== 2024 ===
2024 Andhra Pradesh Legislative Assembly election: Kalyandurg
Party	Candidate	Votes	%	±%
TDP	Amilineni Surendra Babu	118,878	57.75	
YSRCP	Talari Rangaiah	81,144	39.42	
INC	P. Rambhupal Reddy	2,585	1.26	
NOTA	None Of The Above	1,450	0.7	
Majority		37,734	18.33	
Turnout		2,05,841		
TDP gain from YSRCP		Swing		

== See also ==
- List of constituencies of Andhra Pradesh Legislative Assembly
