= Peddavadugur =

- Village
- Interactive map of Peddavadugur
- Location in Andhra Pradesh, India Peddavadugur (India)
- Coordinates: 15°01′15″N 77°40′25″E
- Country: India
- State: Andhra Pradesh
- District: Anantapur
- Talukas: Peddavadugur

Languages
  - Official: Telugu
- Time zone: UTC+5:30 (IST)
- Vehicle registration: AP

Peddavadugur is a village in Anantapur district of the Indian state of Andhra Pradesh. It is the mandal headquarters of Peddavadugur mandal in Anantapur revenue division.

== Villages ==
- Kasepalli
