= Vidapanakal =

- Village
- Interactive map of Vidapanakal
- Location in Andhra Pradesh, India Vidapanakal (India)
- Coordinates: 15.0667°N 77.1833°E
- Country: India
- State: Andhra Pradesh
- District: Anantapur
- Talukas: Vidapanakal
- Elevation: 443 m (1,453 ft)

Population (2001)
  - Total: 48,353

Languages
  - Official: Telugu
- Time zone: UTC+5:30 (IST)
- Vehicle registration: AP02

Vidapanakal is a village in Anantapur district of the Indian state of Andhra Pradesh. It is the mandal headquarters of Vidapanakal mandal in Anantapur revenue division.

== Geography ==
Vidapanakallu is located at 15.0667°N 77.1833°E. It has an average elevation of 443 metres (1456 ft).

== Demographics ==
According to Indian census, 2001, the demographic details of Vidapanakal mandal is as follows:

- Total Population: 48,353 in 9,116 Households.
- Male Population: 24,587 and Female Population: 23,766
- Children Under 6-years of age: 6,897 (Boys - and Girls - 3,342)
- Total Literates: 19,138
