= Pamidi =

- Town
- Interactive map of Pamidi
- Location in Andhra Pradesh, India Pamidi (India)
- Coordinates: 14.9500°N 77.5833°E
- Country: India
- State: Andhra Pradesh
- District: Anantapur

Area
  - Total: 31.56 km^{2} (12.19 sq mi)
- Elevation: 284 m (932 ft)

Population (2011)
  - Total: 26,886
  - Density: 851.9/km^{2} (2,206/sq mi)

Languages
  - Official: Telugu
- Time zone: UTC+5:30 (IST)
- 515775: 515 xxx
- Nearest city: Anantapur
- Vidhan Sabha constituency: Guntakal
- Website: Pamidi website

Pamidi is a town in Anantapur district of the Indian state of Andhra Pradesh. It is the mandal headquarters of Pamidi mandal in Anantapur revenue division.

== Geography ==
Pamidi is located at 14.9500°N 77.5833°E. It has an average elevation of 284 meters (935 ft).

== Demographics ==
As of 2011 Census of India, the town had a population of 30,886. The total population constitutes 13,583 males, 13,303 females, and 2,992 children, in the age group of 0–6 years. The average literacy rate is 68.0%.
