= Kalyandurg =

Kalyandurg Kalyanadurgam
- Town
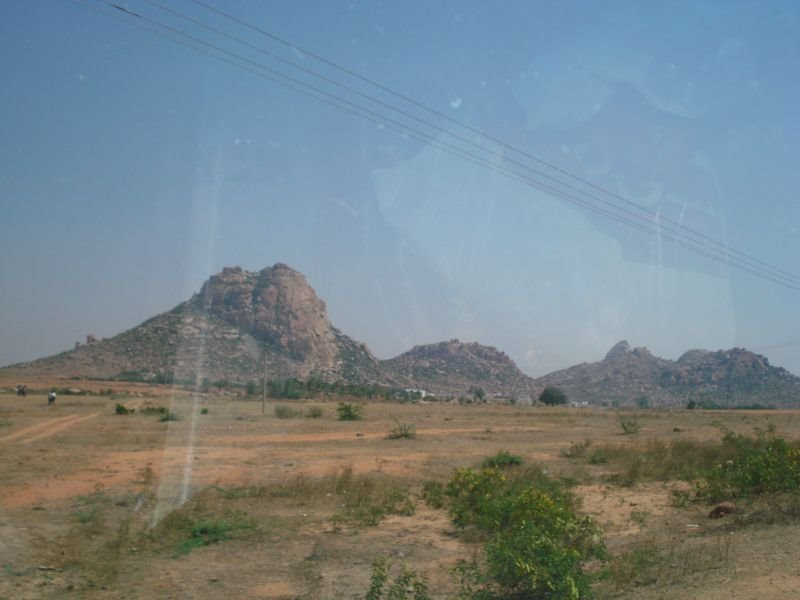
- Akkammagari Konda and surrounding Hills.

- Location in Andhra Pradesh, India
- Coordinates: 14.5500°N 77.1000°E
- Country: India
- State: Andhra Pradesh
- District: Anantapur

Government
  - MLA: Amilineni Surendra Babu

Area
  - Total: 34.92 km^{2} (13.48 sq mi)
- Elevation: 656 m (2,152 ft)

Population (2011)
  - Total: 32,328
  - Density: 925.8/km^{2} (2,398/sq mi)

Languages
  - Official: Telugu
- Time zone: UTC+5:30 (IST)
- Postal code: 515 xxx
- Website: Kalyandurg Municipality

Kalyandurg, also called Kalyanadurgam, is a town in Anantapur district of the Indian state of Andhra Pradesh. It is the headquarters for Kalyandurg mandal and Kalyandurgam revenue division. The discovery of diamond-bearing Kimberlites in Kalyandurg area, is one of the clusters that has been discovered.

== History ==
Kalyandurg was under the rule of Sri Krishnadevaraya and was a part of Vijayanagara Empire.

As per The imperial gazetteer of India, Rayadurg, Chitradurga and Kalyandurg are the three important forts that were ruled by Boya Palegars. The name Kalyandurg came from Boya Kalyanappa, a Palegar in the 16th century. Kalyandurg was very turbulent during the Vijayanagar rule.

Kalyandurg taluk was formed in December 1893 by the British out of portions of Dharmavaram and of the Rayadurg taluk of Bellary. In March 2012 Kalyandurg became a municipality.

Kalyandurg was a taluk of Anantapur district in Madras province which was earlier a part of Dharmavaram that was separated in 1893.

Sri Subrahmanyeswara Swamy temple is located at the heart of the town. This temple was built around the 16th century.

Anantapur district is replete with megalithic remains. In the vicinity of Kalyanadurg, several hundred megalithic monuments, such as dolemnoid cists and cairn circles are situated at the foothills and the slopes of the Akkamma Vari hills. Another large group of cairn circles is 2 km north of Akkamma Gari Konda. Similar remains are located at Mudigallu, a village about 5 km easterly to Kalyandurg, and Muthalabanda village, 2 km north east of town, and Gallapalli situated towards Rayadurgam.

== Geography ==
Kalyandurg is located at 14.5500°N 77.1000°E. It has an average elevation of 591 metres (1942 ft).

== Demographics ==
As of 2011 Census of India, Kalyandurg had a population of 32,328. The population constituted 16,036 males and 16,292 females — a sex ratio of 1016 females per 1000 males. 3,404 children are in the age group of 0–6 years, of which 1,760 are boys and 1,644 are girls — a ratio of 979 per 1000. The average literacy rate stands at 74.14% with 21,443 literates, significantly higher than the state average of 67.41%.

== Governance ==
=== Civic administration ===
The municipality is spread over an area of 15.895 km^{2} (6.137 mi^{2}). It has an expenditure of ₹229.29 crore (US$24 million) and generates an annual income of ₹222.87 crore (US$24 million). The municipal body oversees the supply of water with 70 litres per capita per day, in the form 453 public taps and 66 bore–wells. Its other services include maintenance of community halls, secondary and elementary schools and 13.45 km^{2} (5.19 mi^{2}) of roads, maternity and child health center such as the Government Hospital, RDT Hospital, and others.

== Politics ==
Kalyandurg is one of 14 constituencies in Anantapur district, representing Andhra Pradesh Legislative Assembly. Amilineni Surendra Babu Chowdary of Telugu Desam Party is the present MLA representing Kalyandurg (Assembly constituency).

=== Members of Legislative Assembly ===
Year	Member	Political party
1952	Narayanappa Sanda	Indian National Congress
1952	Santhappa	Indian National Congress
1967	T.C. Mareppa	Independent politician
1972	M. Lakshmi Devi	Indian National Congress
1978	Hindi Narasappa	Janata Party
1983	T.C. Mareppa	Telugu Desam Party
1985	Pakeerappa	Communist Party of India
1989	M Lakshmi Devi	Indian National Congress
1994	B C Govindappa	Telugu Desam Party
1999	A Saradamba	Telugu Desam Party
2004	B C Govindappa	Telugu Desam Party
2009	Raghuveera Reddy	Indian National Congress
2014	U Hanumantaraya Chowdary	Telugu Desam Party
2019	K.V.Ushashri Charan	YSR Congress Party
2024	Amilineni Surendra Babu Chowdary	Telugu Desam Party

== Education ==
The primary and secondary school education is imparted by government, aided and private schools, under the School Education Department of the state. The medium of instruction followed by different schools are English and Telugu.

== Transport ==
The Kalyandurg railway station is under the jurisdiction of Bangalore railway division of South Western Railway Zone

== More pictures ==
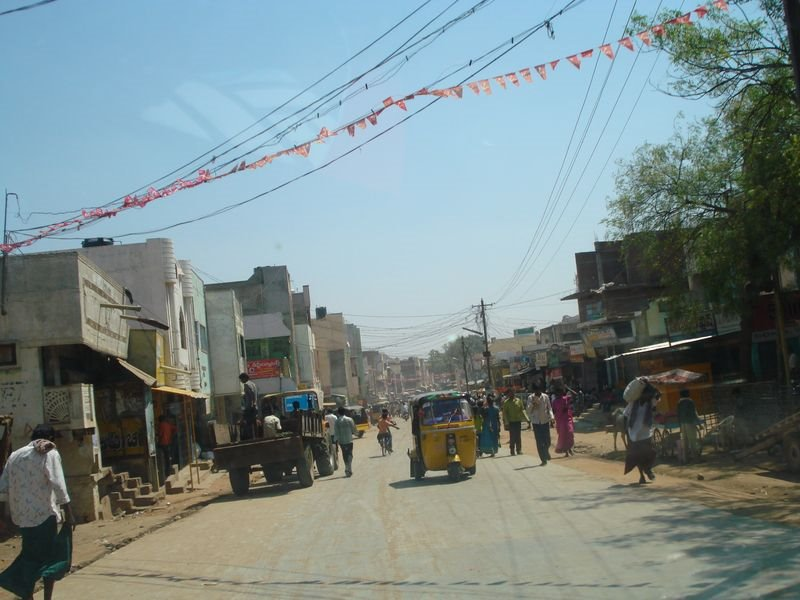
Dodagatta Road

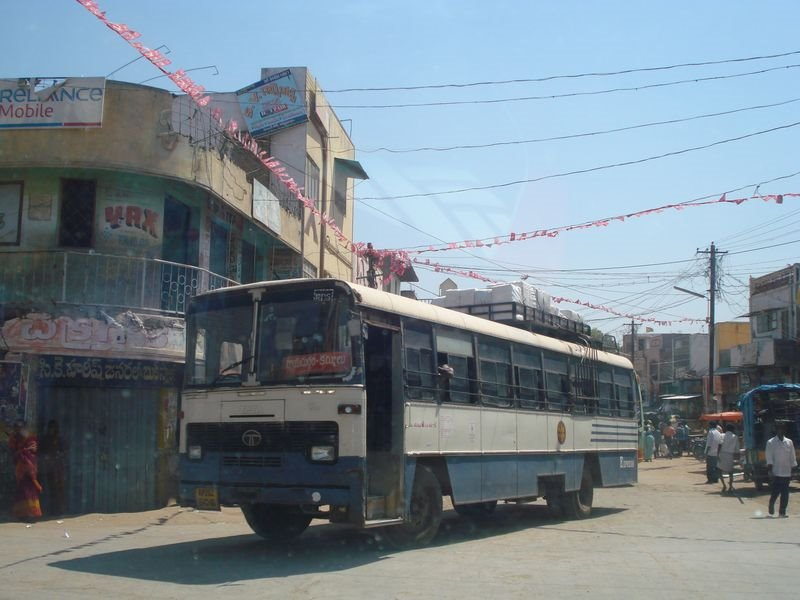
T-Circle near Majzid

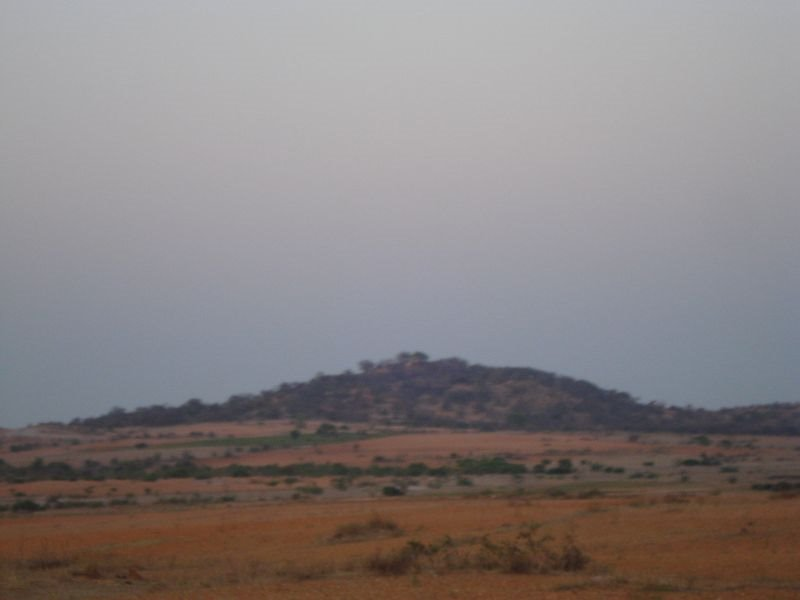
ThimmppaSwamy Konda, Mulakanoor

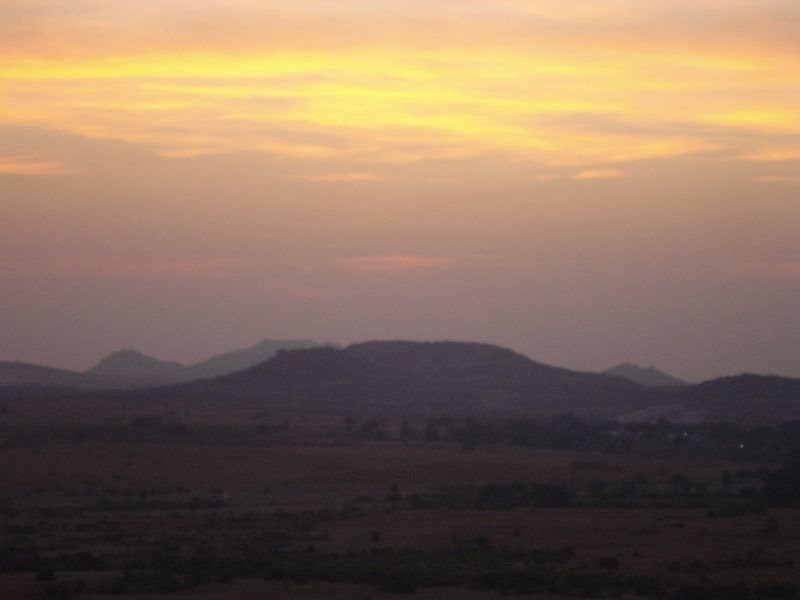
Beautiful Sunset in the month of March.

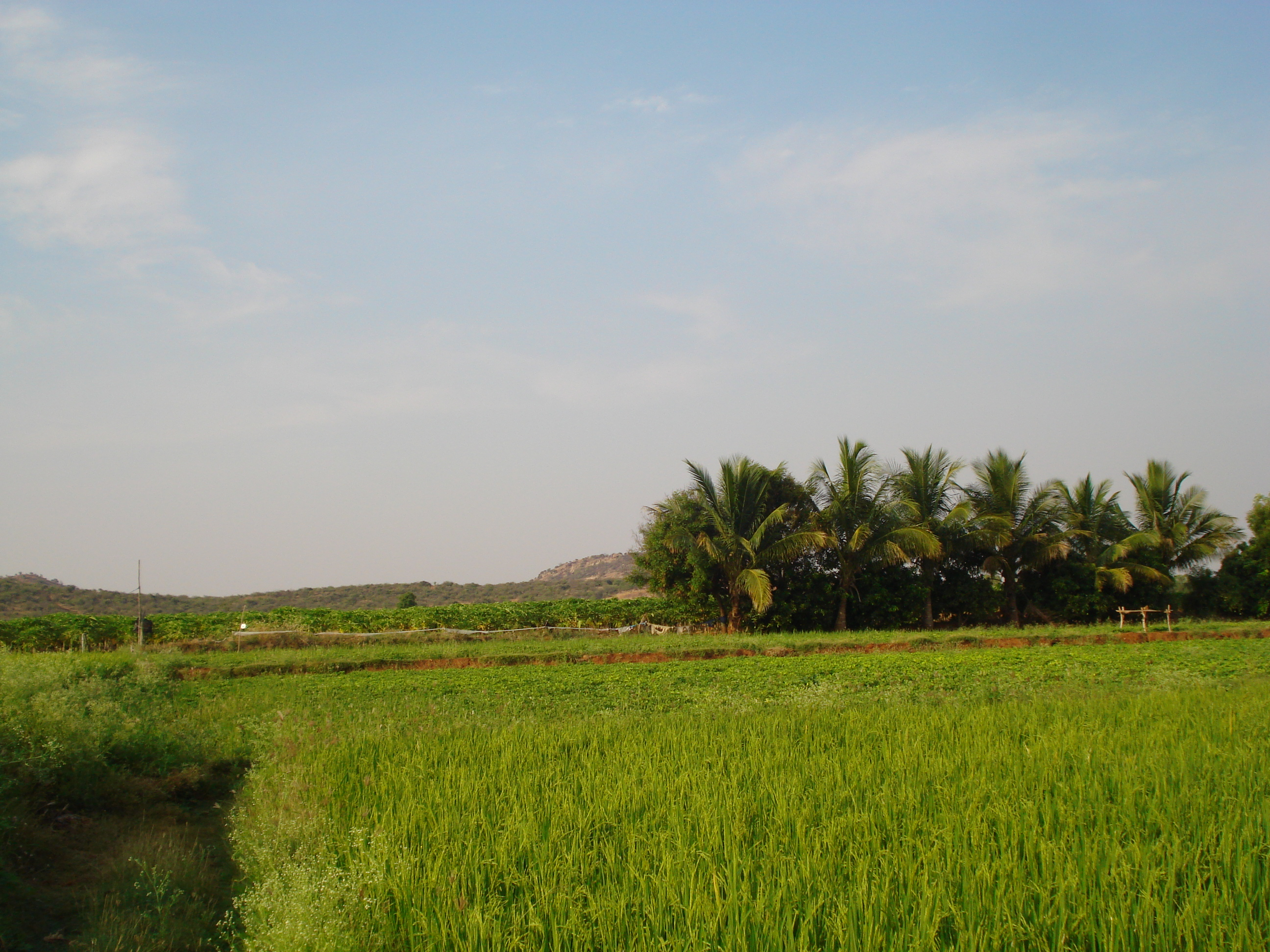
Agriculture fields at South side of KLD Taluq.

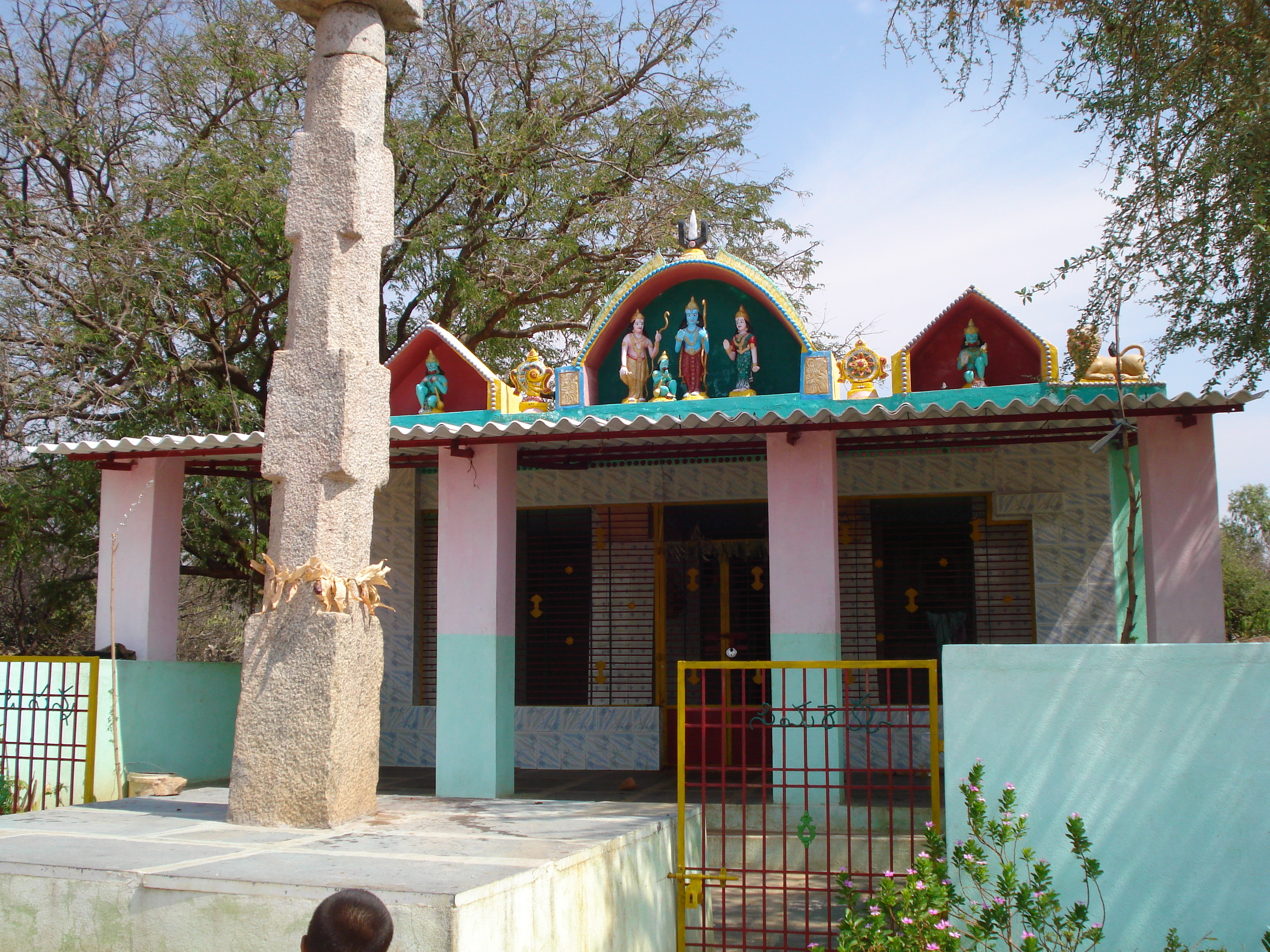
Temple inside of the forest/keirevu.

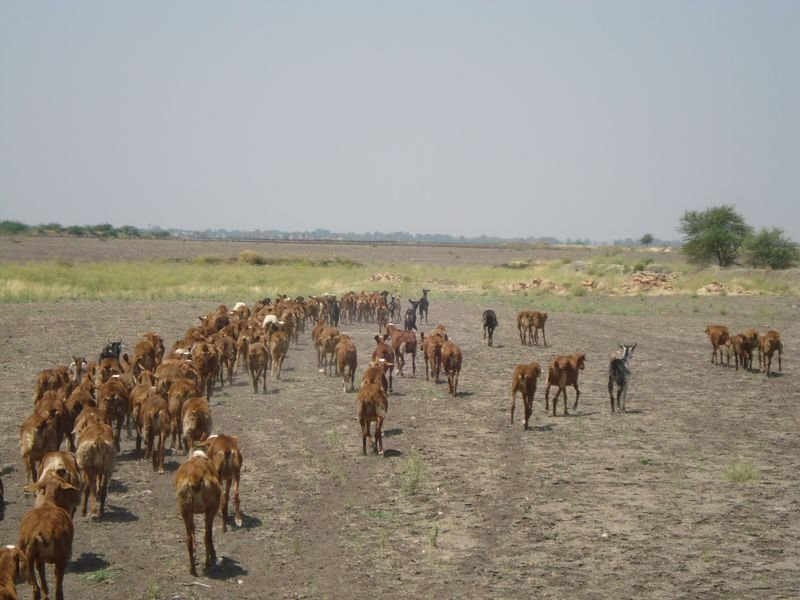
Cattles on black soil at North side of Kalyandurg.

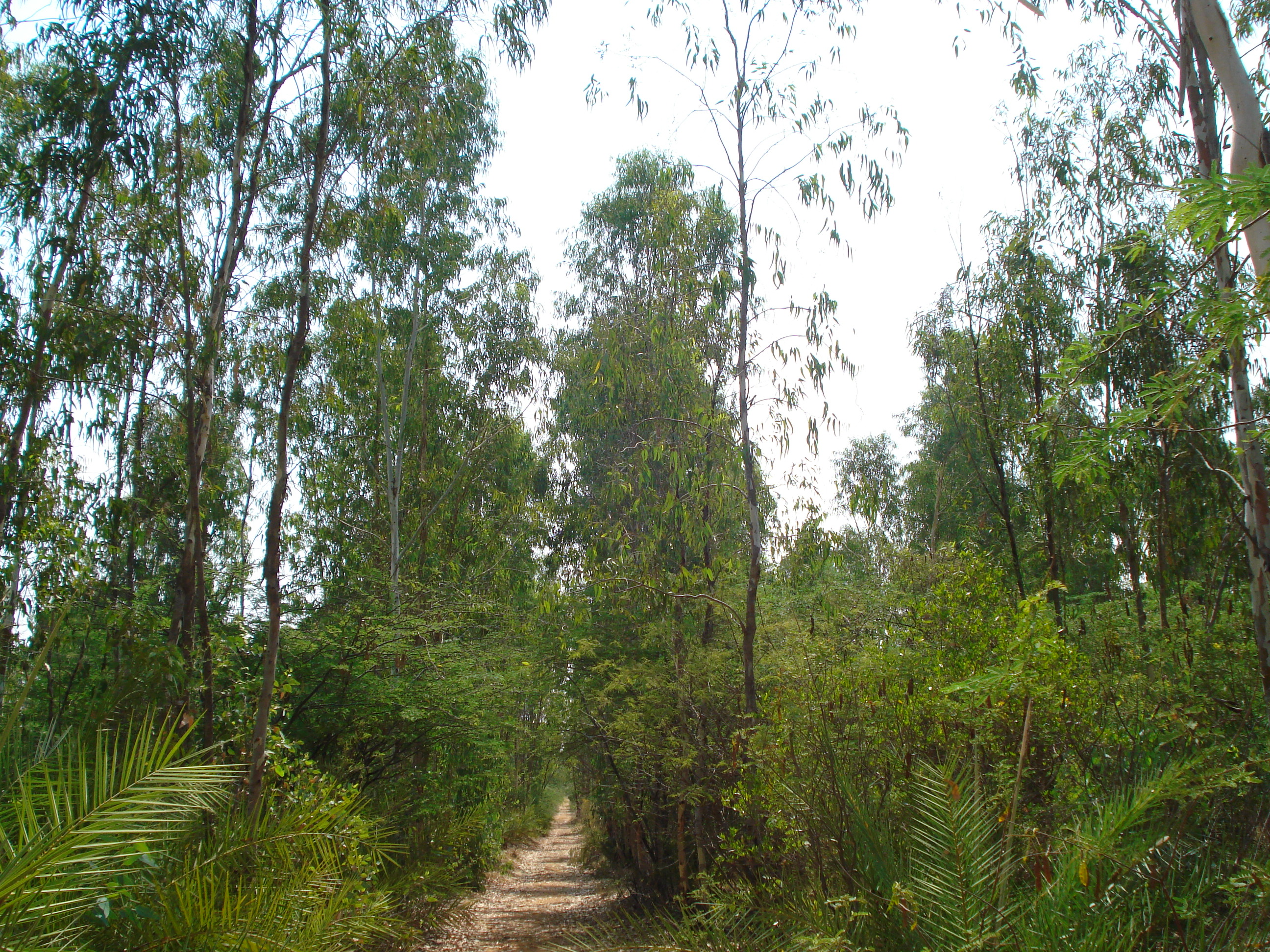
In Side of Kairevu Reserved forest located in Kalyandurg Taluq.

== See also ==
- Anantapur district
