= Rayadurgam =

- Town
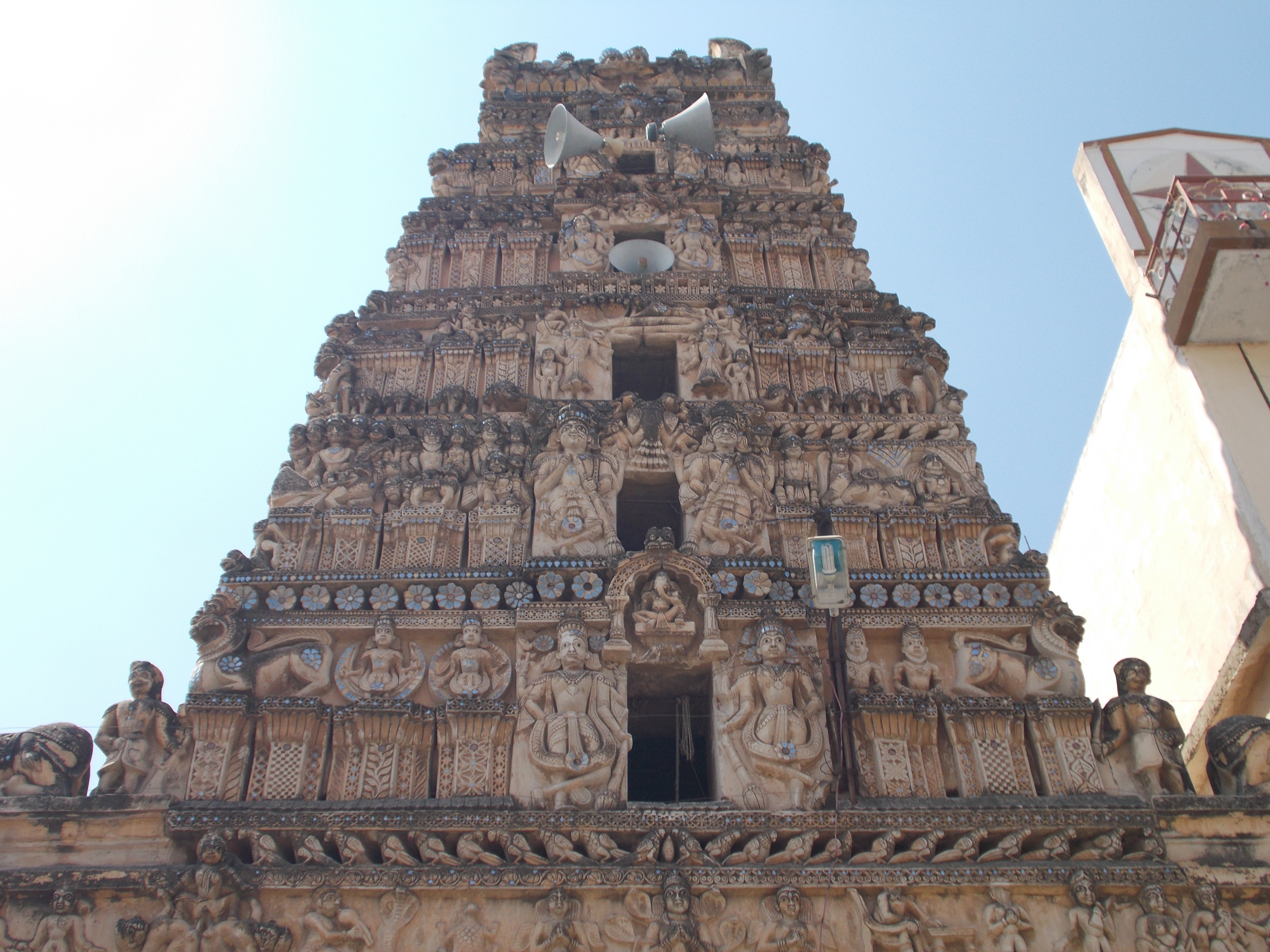
- Temple in Rayadurgam

- Location in Andhra Pradesh, India
- Coordinates: 14.7000°N 76.8667°E
- Country: India
- State: Andhra Pradesh
- District: Anantapur

Area
  - Total: 49.73 km^{2} (19.20 sq mi)
- Elevation: 543 m (1,781 ft)

Population (2011)
  - Total: 61,749
  - Density: 1,242/km^{2} (3,216/sq mi)

Languages
  - Official: Telugu
- Time zone: UTC+5:30 (IST)
- PIN: 515 865
- Telephone code: +91–8495
- Website: rayadurg.cdma.ap.gov.in/en

Rayadurgam is a town in Anantapur District in the Indian state of Andhra Pradesh. It is governed by a municipal council. Rayadurgam is known for its production of textile goods and textile manufacturing industry. Rayadurgam is in Southern India about 451.6 km (280.6 mi) from Hyderabad. Rayadurgam is now slowly developing with proper transportation, modern amenities. Rayadurgam is well connected with other cities in Andhra Pradesh and Karnataka through well infrastructure of NH 544DD Highway. The nearest airport is Ballari Airport in Karnataka followed by Kurnool, Puttaparthi and Bengaluru . Rayadurgam also has a train station with major stations nearby such as Ballari, Guntakal, Gooty & Anantapur.

== Demographics ==
As of 2011 Census of India, the town had a population of 61,749. The total population constitute, 30,911 males, 30,838 females and 7,462 children, in the age group of 0–6 years. The average literacy rate stands at 69.6% with 37,781 literates, significantly lower than the national average of 73%. Telugu is the official language in Rayadurgam.

== Governance ==
=== Civic administration ===
Rayadurgam municipality is the civic body of the town. It was constituted on 1 October 1963. It is classified as a Second grade municipality and the jurisdiction of the civic body is spread over an area of 50 km^{2} (19 sq mi) with 31 election wards.

== Education ==
The primary and secondary school education is imparted by government, aided and private schools, under the School Education Department of the state. The medium of instruction followed by different schools are English, Telugu and Urdu.

== Transport ==
Rayadurgam Junction railway station falls under the jurisdiction of Hubli railway division of South Western Railway Zone.
