= Anantapur district =

- District of Andhra Pradesh
- Ananthapuramu district
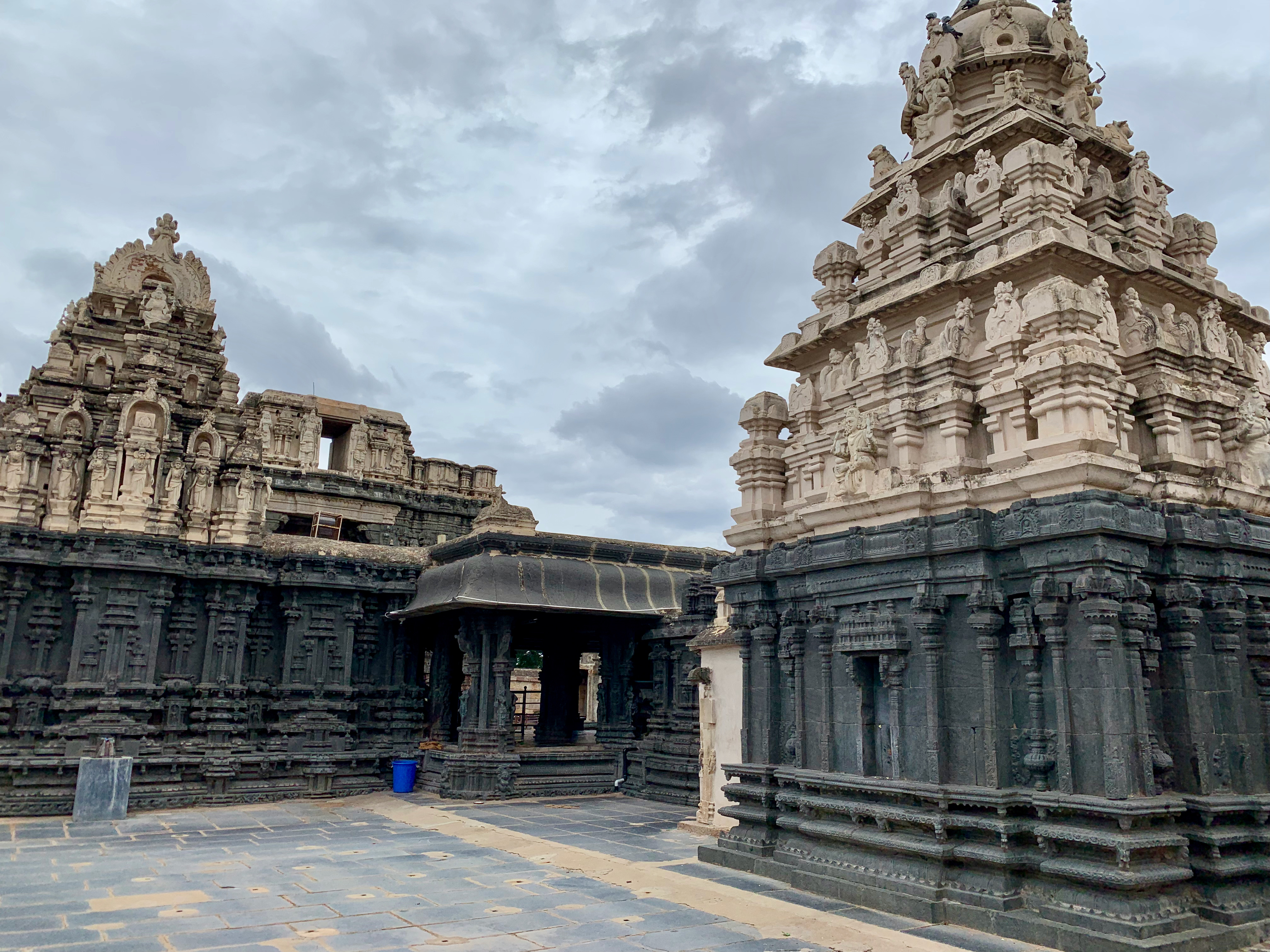
- Bugga Ramalingeswara temple in Tadipatri
- Etymology: Telugu: Anantasagara (Big Tank)
- Interactive map of Anantapur district
- Coordinates: 14.678°N 77.607°E
- Country: India
- State: Andhra Pradesh
- Region: Rayalaseema
- Established: 1882
- Reorganised: 4 April 2022
- Named for: Big Tank
- Headquarters: Anantapur
- Administrative divisions: List: 3 revenue divisions: Ananthapuramu; Kalyandurgam; Guntakal; 32 mandals; 6 municipalities; 577 gram panchayats

Government
  - District collector: M.Gauthami
  - Lok Sabha: Lok Sabha list: Anantapur; Hindupur
  - Assembly: Assembly list: Anantapur; Guntakal; Kalyandurg; Raptadu; Rayadurg; Singanamala (SC); Tadipatri; Uravakonda

Area
  - Total: 10,205 km^{2} (3,940 sq mi)

Population (2011)
  - Total: 2,241,105
  - Density: 219.61/km^{2} (568.78/sq mi)
  - Sex ratio: 977 (females per 1,000 males)

Languages
  - Official: Telugu

Literacy
- Time zone: UTC+5:30 (IST)
- Postal Index Number: 515xxx
- Area codes: +91–8554
- ISO 3166 code: IN-AP
- Vehicle registration: AP-02 (former) AP–39 (from 30 January 2019)
- District LGD code: 502
- District abbreviation: ANT
- Website: ananthapuramu.ap.gov.in

Anantapur district, officially Ananthapuramu district, is one of the eight districts in the Rayalaseema region of the Indian state of Andhra Pradesh. The district headquarters is located in Anantapur city. It is one of the driest places in South India. In the year 2022, as part of re-organisation of districts, Sri Sathya Sai district was carved out.

== Etymology ==
The name Ananthapuramu was named after a reservoir called Anantasagaram, a big tank, which means "Endless Ocean". The villages of Ananthasagaram and Bukkarayasamudram were constructed by Chikkappa Wadeyar, the minister of Bukka Raya I. Some authorities assert that Anaantasagaram was named after Ananthamma, wife of Bukka Raya I, one of the founders of the Vijayanagar empire. , while some contend that it must have been known after Anantarasa Chikkavodeya himself, as Bukka-Raya had no queen by that name.

== History ==
The region comprising present-day Anantapur district has a rich and layered history, with its earliest significance emerging as a hub for Buddhist culture and trade. From the 3rd century BCE to the 3rd century CE, the area around Anantapur was part of ancient trade routes. Archaeological evidence suggests that Gooty was a known Buddhist site, and the district lay along ancient trade and pilgrimage routes that connected Vengi to other Buddhist establishments.

The region's strategic importance is underscored by the Gooty Fort, one of the oldest hill forts in India. Following the decline of Buddhism, the region fell under the control of successive Hindu dynasties, including the Chalukyas, and the Vijayanagara Empire. During the Vijayanagara period, the area was administered by Nayaka dynasties. After the fall of Vijayanagara in 1565, the area was controlled by various Nayaka clans. In the 18th century, Gooty Fort became a strategic stronghold of the Marathas before being captured by Hyder Ali. In 1789 it was ceded by his son Tipu Sultan to the Nizam of Hyderabad. In 1800 the Nizam ceded the surrounding districts to the British in payment for a subsidiary British force.

In 1882, Anantapuram district was formed by carving out from Bellary district. Revenue mandals of Kadiri, Mudigubba, Nallamada, N.P.Kunta, Talupula, Nallacheruvu, O.D.Cheruvu, Tanakal, Amadagur and Gandlapenta (previous Kadiri Taluk) from erstwhile YSR Kadapa District were added in the year 1910. In the year 1956, the revenue mandals of Rayadurg, D.Hirehal, Kanekal, Bommanahal and Gummagatta of Bellary District were added, with the formation of Andhra Pradesh. As of 2011 census of India, it was the largest district in the state by area and had a population of 2,241,105. As per the Gazette notification No.122 dt 26 January 2022 (G.O.Rt.No.55, Revenue (Land-IV), 25 January 2022), Sri Sathya Sai district was formed from Ananthapuramu district.

Historical population
Year	Pop.	±% p.a.
1901	1,025,322	—
1911	1,053,449	+0.27%
1921	1,040,166	−0.13%
1931	1,138,081	+0.90%
1941	1,273,079	+1.13%
1951	1,483,591	+1.54%
1961	1,767,464	+1.77%
1971	2,115,321	+1.81%
1981	2,548,012	+1.88%
1991	3,180,863	+2.24%
2001	3,640,478	+1.36%
2011	4,081,148	+1.15%

As of 2011 census of India, the undivided Anantapuramu district has a population of 4,081,148 with 9,68,160 households, ranking it as the 7th most populous district in the state. It is the largest district in the state with an area of 19,130 km^{2} (7,390 sq mi). Anantapur has a sex ratio of 977 females for every 1000 males, and a literacy rate of 64.28%. Urban population in the district is 28.9% of total population.

The Gross District Domestic Product (GDDP) of the undivided district for FY 2013-14 is ₹35,838 crore (US$3.8 billion) and it contributes 6.8% to the Gross State Domestic Product (GSDP). For the FY 2013–14, the per capita income at current prices was ₹69,562 (US$740). The primary, secondary and tertiary sectors of the district contribute ₹9,944 crore (US$1.1 billion), ₹7,752 crore (US$830 million) and ₹18,142 crore (US$1.9 billion) respectively to the GDDP.

== Geography ==
It is one of the largest districts of Andhra Pradesh spanning an area of 10,205 square kilometres (3,940 sq mi). It is bounded on the north by Kurnool district and Nandyal district, on the east by Kadapa district, and south by Sri Sathya Sai district and on the southwest and west by Chitradurga district and Bellary district in Karnataka state. It is part of Rayalaseema region on the state.

The northern part of the district has large areas of black cotton soil, while the southern part has mainly poor red soil. There are two major hill ranges namely Mutchukota hills Nagasamudram hills, accounting for 70% of forest area.

Penna, Chithravathi, Pedda Hagari, Chinna Hagari, Thadakaleru and Pandameru are the main rivers. The average elevation is about 1300 feet above the mean sea level. The annual normal rainfall of the district is 508.2 mm. It is noted to be the driest part of Andhra Pradesh.

== Demographics ==
Religion in Anantapuramu district based on the 2011 Census
Religion	Percent
Hinduism	88.45%
Islam	10.37%
Christianity	0.69%
Other or not stated	0.49%

Based on the 2011 census, the district had a population of 2,241,105, of which 753,354 (33.62%) lived in urban areas. The district had a sex ratio of 978 females per 1000 males. Scheduled Castes and Scheduled Tribes make up 3,34,142 (14.91%) and 70,161 (3.13%) of the population respectively. Hinduism is the major religion with 88.45% followers, while Islam has 10.37%.

Languages of Anantapuram district based on the 2011 Census
1. Telugu (84.6%)
2. Urdu (9.64%)
3. Kannada (3.03%)
4. Lambadi (1.42%)
5. Others (1.32%)

Based on the 2011 census, 84.59% of the population spoke Telugu, 9.64% Urdu, 3.03% Kannada and 1.42% Lambadi as their first language.

== Administrative divisions ==
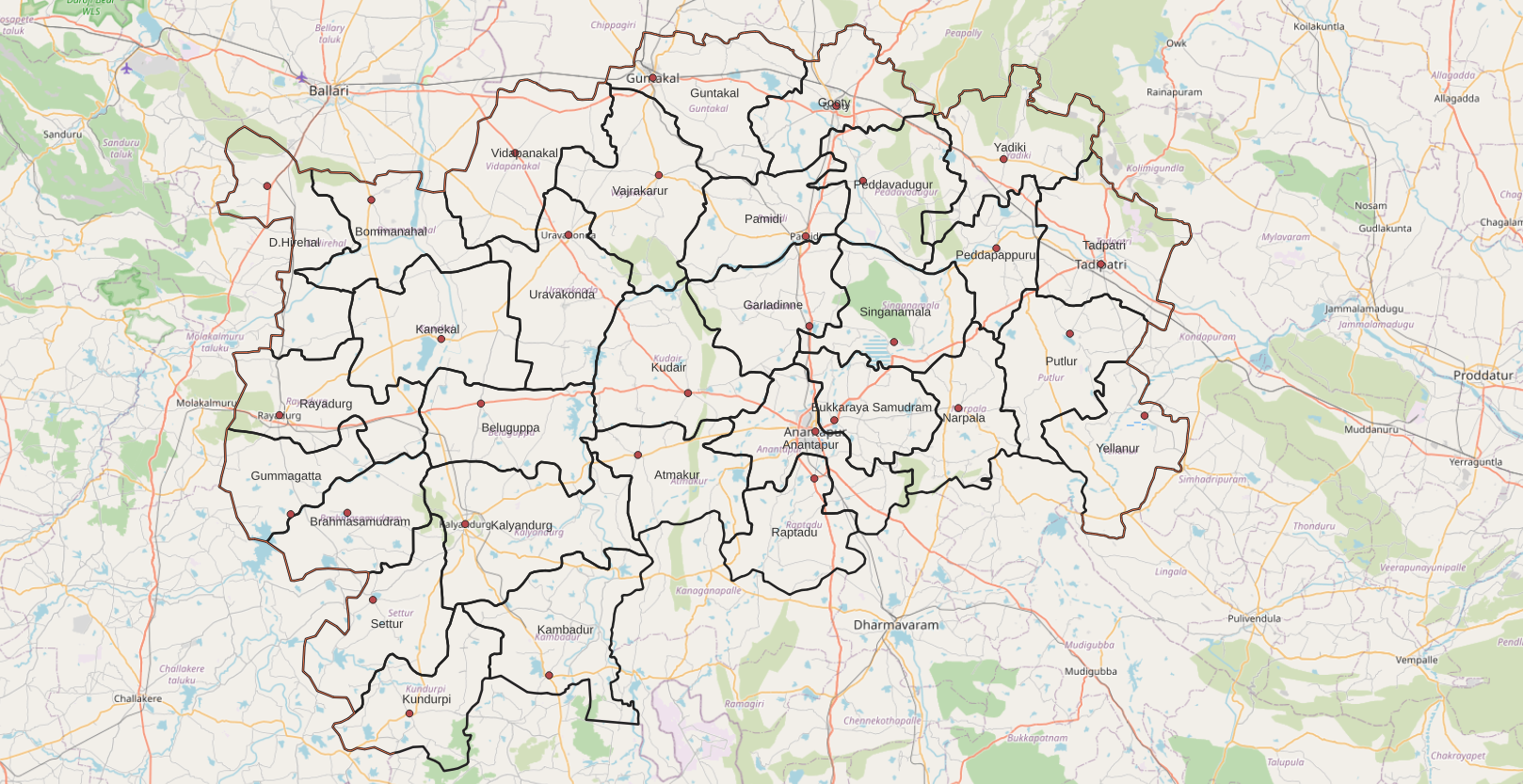
Map of mandals of Anantapuramu district

== Politics ==
There are two parliamentary constituencies in the district namely, Anantapuram Parliament constituency, Hindupuram parliament constituency (partial).

Legislative assembly constituencies in the district are given below.

Constituency number	Name	Reserved for (SC/ST/None)	Parliament
155	Raptadu	None	Hindupuram
148	Rayadurgam	None	Anantapuram
149	Uravakonda	None	Anantapuram
150	Guntakallu	None	Anantapuram
151	Tadpatri	None	Anantapuram
152	Singanamala	SC	Anantapuram
153	Anantapuram Urban	None	Anantapuram
154	Kalyandurgam	None	Anantapuram

The district is divided into 3 revenue divisions: Ananthapuramu, Guntakal and Kalyandurgam, which are further subdivided into a total of 32 mandals, each headed by a sub-collector.

=== Mandals ===
The list of 32 mandals in Ananthapuramu district, divided into 3 revenue divisions, is given below.

1. Ananthapuramu revenue division
  1. Anantapur Urban
  2. Anantapur Rural
  3. Atmakur
  4. Bukkaraya Samudram
  5. Garladinne
  6. Kudair
  7. Narpala
  8. Peddapappur
  9. Putlur
  10. Raptadu
  11. Singanamala
  12. Tadipatri
  13. Yellanur
2. Guntakal revenue division
  1. Gooty
  2. Guntakal
  3. Pamidi
  4. Peddavadugur
  5. Uravakonda
  6. Vajrakarur
  7. Vidapanakal
  8. Yadiki
3. Kalyandurg revenue division
  1. Beluguppa
  2. Bommanahal
  3. Brahmasamudram
  4. D.Hirehal
  5. Gummagatta
  6. Kalyandurg
  7. Kambadur
  8. Kanekal
  9. Kundurpi
  10. Rayadurgam
  11. Settur

== Cities and towns ==
There are one municipal corporation, five municipalities, and one nagar panchayat in the district.

Municipal Bodies in Anantapuramu District
Town	Civic Status of Town	Population (2011)
Anantapur	Municipal Corporation	3,40,613
Guntakal	Municipality Selection Grade	1,28,142
Tadipatri	Municipality Special Grade	1,20,990
Rayadurgam	Municipality Grade - 2	61,749
Gooty	Municipality Grade - 3	48,658
Kalyanadurg	Municipality Grade - 3	39,855
Pamidi	Nagar Panchayat	26,886

== Economy ==
Agriculture

The economy is principally agrarian with a developing industrial sector. The district receives very less rainfall due to its location in the rain shadow area of Indian Peninsula. Prominent crops include groundnut, sunflower, rice, cotton, maize, chillies, sesame, sugarcane and silk

Industries Industries like constructions, manufactures and electricity are major contributors for GVA.

Minerals Gold, diamonds, limestone, iron ore, quartz, asbestos, dolomite, barytes, steatite, granite, and clay are found in the district.

Power plants Solar thermal power plant of 50 MW was commissioned at Nagalapuram village in Peddavadaguru mandal of the district occupying an area of 600 acres under Jawaharlal Nehru National Solar Mission which was named as Megha Solar Plant. It is one of the 7 solar thermal plants in the country.

Tadipatri region in Anantapur is an industrialised town famous for granite and cement production. Ultra Tech cements a unit of industrial major Larsen & Toubro has a major cement production unit near the town.

== Transport ==
National Highway 44 (India) passes through the district via Anantapur. The major railway stations are Guntakal Junction, Gooty Junction and Rayadurg Junction. Kempegowda International Airport, Bengaluru is the nearest international airport at 190 km from the district headquarters. Other small-scale domestic airports are there in neighbouring districts of Kurnool and Kadapa which are around 150 km and 200 km away respectively.

== Education ==
As per the year 2019-20, there were 3085 schools, 143 junior colleges, 42 degree colleges. There is 1 medical college, 14 engineering colleges, 23 ITI, 11 polytechnic and 18 degree colleges.

Some of the institutions include Sri Krishnadevaraya University, JNTU Ananthapur, Sri Sathya Sai University, Government Medical College, Government polytechnic anantapur, Srinivasa Ramanujan Institute of Technology, Government Polytechnic Hindupur, Gates Institute of Technology, Central University of Andhra Pradesh,

== Tourism ==
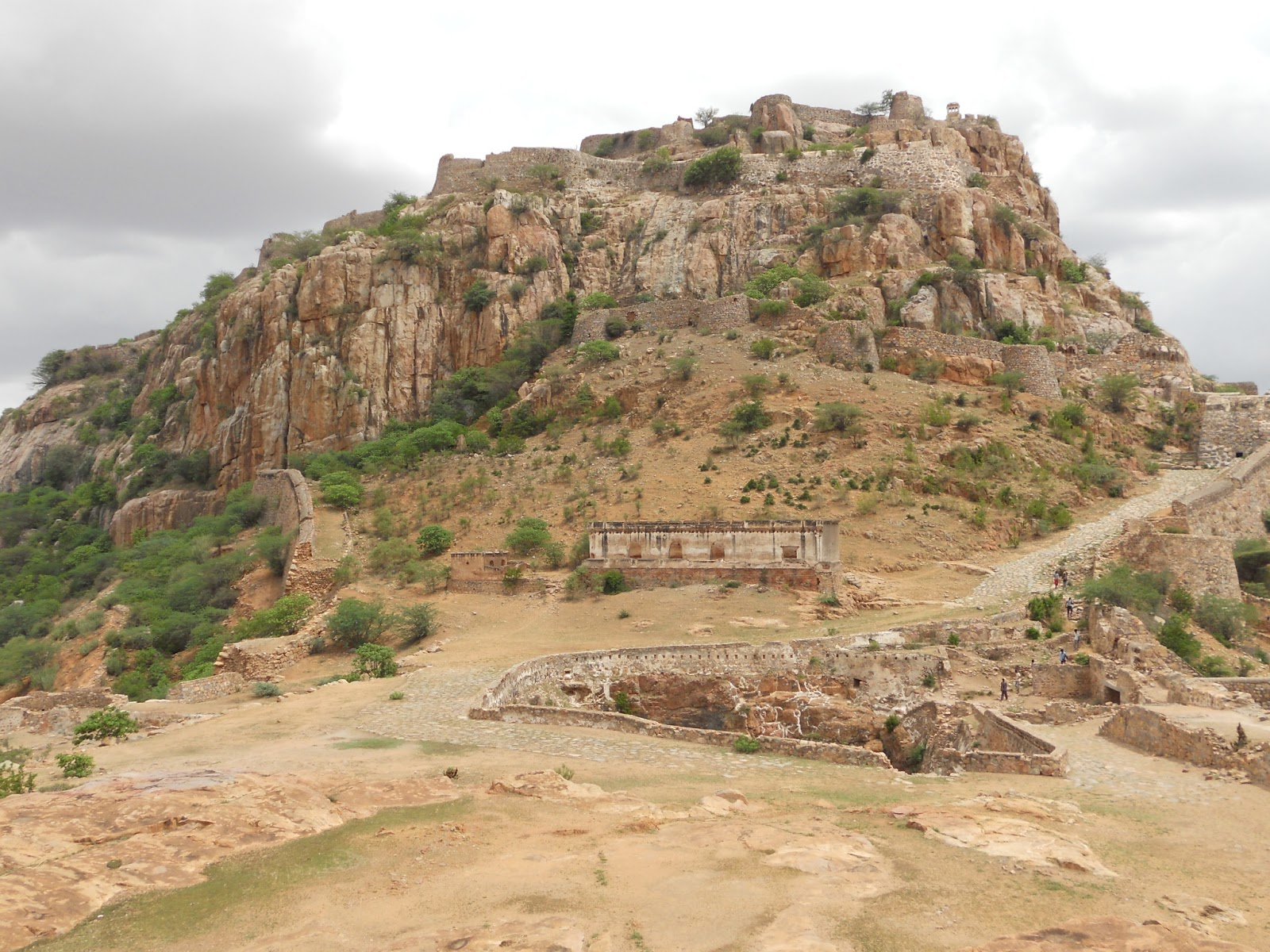
Gooty Fort

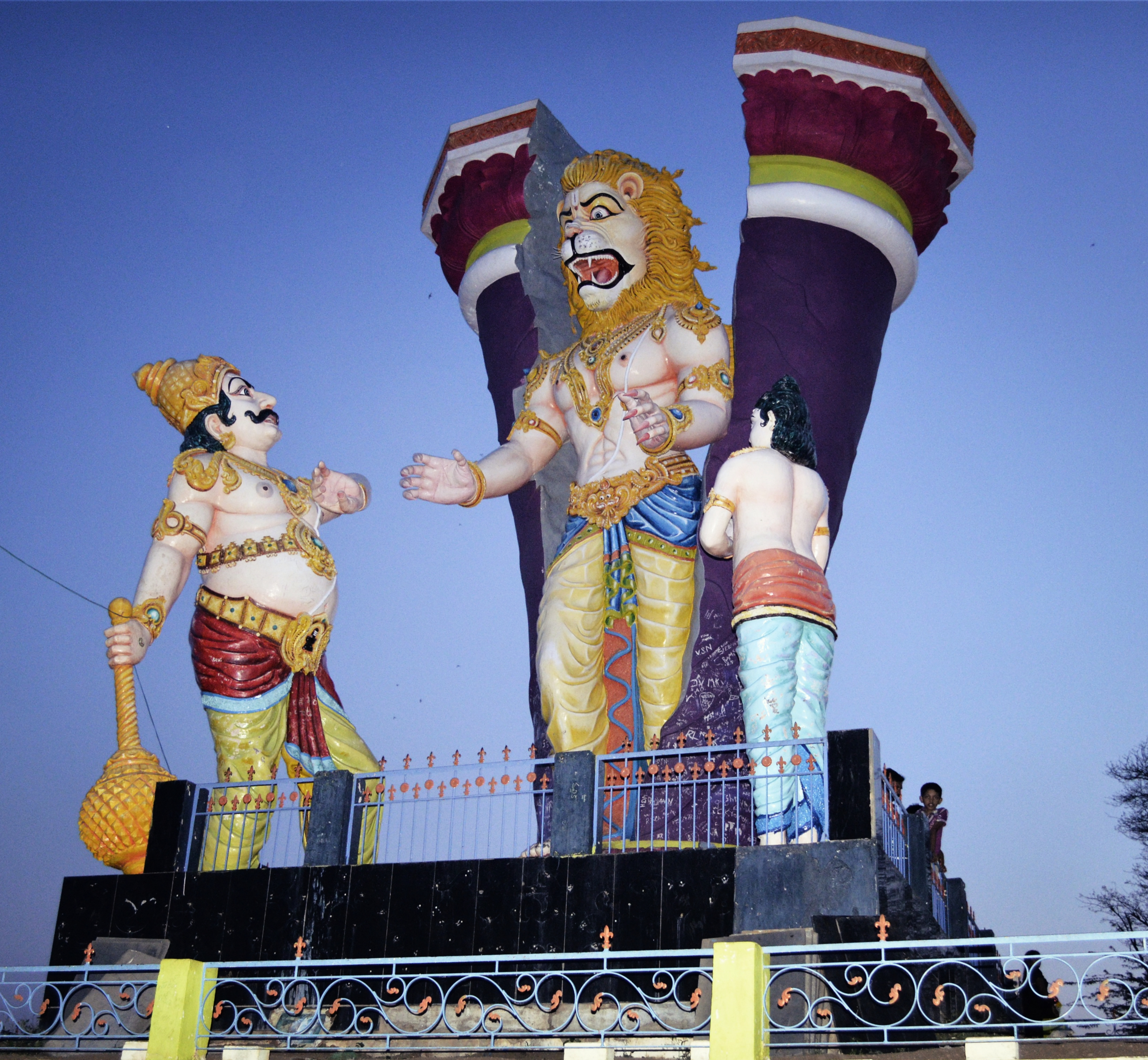
Lakshmi Narasimhaswamy temple, Penna Ahobilam

Gooty Fort is a historical fort on a hill dating to 11th century. It is at a distance of 52 kms from Anantapur. Penna Ahobilam is famous for Lakshmi Narasimhaswamy temple. It is at a distance of 36 km from Anantapur.

== Notable people ==
Neelam Sanjiva Reddy born in Illur village, Garladinne mandal, rose to became President of India after serving in other roles such as Lok sabha speaker, chief minister of Andhra Pradesh and central minister. T. Nagi Reddy born in Tarimela village of Singanamala mandal. He was a freedom fighter and popular communist leader.
