= Naidupeta revenue division =

Former revenue division in Andhra Pradesh, India

Naidupeta revenue division Nayudupeta revenue division
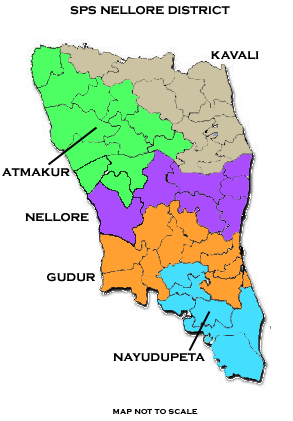
- Naidupeta revenue division in the erstwhile Nellore district
- Country: India
- State: Andhra Pradesh
- District: Nellore
- Formed: 25 June 2013
- Dissolved: 4 April 2022
- Founder: Government of Andhra Pradesh
- Headquarters: Naidupeta
- Time zone: UTC+05:30 (IST)

Naidupeta revenue division, also spelt Nayudupeta revenue division, was an administrative division in the Nellore district of Indian state of Andhra Pradesh. It was formed in 2013 with six mandals and was merged into the newly formed Sullurupeta revenue division of Tirupati district in 2022 as part of the reorganization of the districts in the state.

== History ==
Naidupeta revenue division was formed on 25 June 2013 becoming is one of the five revenue divisions in the Nellore district, with six mandals under its administration. The divisional headquarters are located at Naidupeta. On 4 April 2022, the Government of Andhra Pradesh reorganized the districts and formed Sullurupeta revenue division and Tirupati district. The Nellore district was also reorganized. All the six mandals were transferred to the Sullurupeta revenue division, thus dissolving the Naidupeta revenue division.

== Administration ==
There were six mandals administered under Naidupeta revenue division: Doravarisatram, Naidupeta, Ojili, Pellakur, Sullurpeta and Tada. All of these mandals were earlier part of Gudur revenue division.

== See also ==
- List of revenue divisions in Andhra Pradesh
- List of mandals in Andhra Pradesh
