= Gudur revenue division =

Revenue division in Nellore district, Andhra Pradesh, India

- revenue division of Nellore district
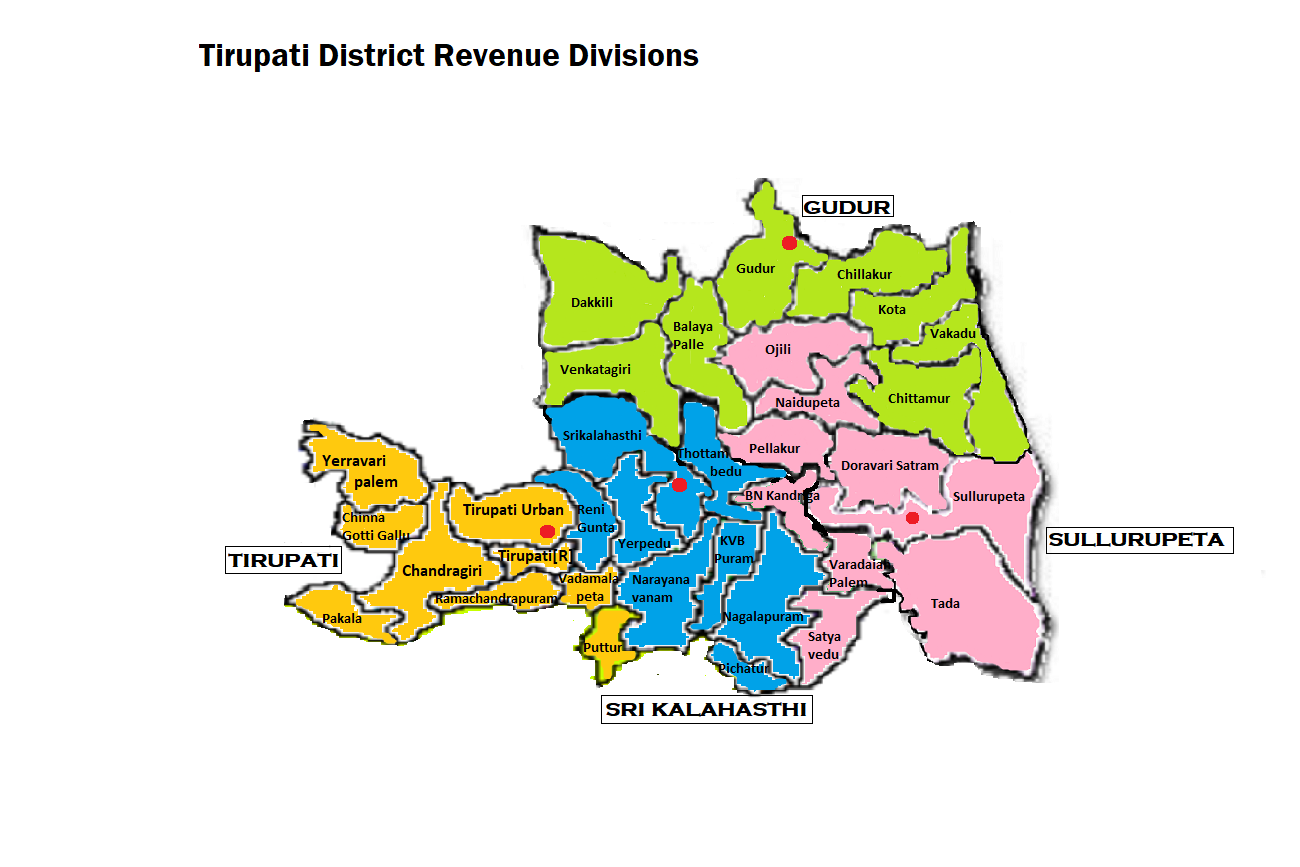
- Gudur revenue division in erstwhile Tirupati district
- Country: India
- State: Andhra Pradesh
- District: SPSR Nellore
- Headquarters: Gudur
- Time zone: UTC+05:30 (IST)

Gudur revenue division is an administrative division in the Nellore district of the Indian state of Andhra Pradesh. It is one of the four revenue divisions in Nellore district with three mandals under its administration. The divisional headquarters are located at Gudur.

== History ==
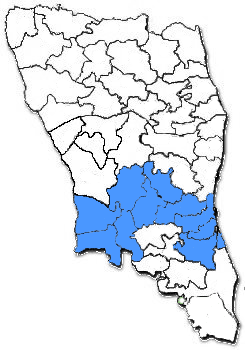
Gudur revenue division during 2013–2022 when it was part of Nellore district

As of 2011 census, Gudur revenue division comprised 15 mandals: Balayapalle, Chillakur, Chittamur, Dakkili, Doravarisatram, Gudur, Kota, Manubolu, Naidupet, Ojili, Pellakur, Sullurpeta, Tada, Vakadu and Venkatagiri. In 2013, the six mandals of the division, namely, Doravarisatram, Naidupeta, Ojili, Pellakur, Sullurupeta and Tada were transferred to the Naidupeta revenue division.

== Administration ==
The division was reorganized with 3 mandals effective from 31 December 2025.

1. Chillakur,
2. Gudur
3. Kota

== See also ==
- List of revenue divisions in Andhra Pradesh
- List of mandals in Andhra Pradesh
