= Elavur =

- village
- Location in Tamil Nadu, India Elavur (India)
- Coordinates: 13.4628135°N 80.1191296°E
- Country: India
- State: Tamil Nadu
- District: Tiruvallur
- Taluk: Gummidipoondi taluk
- Elevation: 14 m (46 ft)

Population (2011)
  - Total: 5,390
- Time zone: UTC+5:30 (IST)
- 2011 census code: 628563

Elavur is a village in the Tiruvallur district of Tamil Nadu, India. It is located in the Gummidipoondi taluk border between Tamil Nadu and Andhra Pradesh. NH16 Chennai-Kolkata Highway. India's First modern Integrated Check post opened by Tamil Nadu chief minister and also located frontline medical village. ELR is and railway station code for Elavur.Farming land can be found in this place.

== Transport ==
Elavur lies on the National Highway 16 (India) from Chennai to Calcutta, which is a part of Golden Quadrilateral Highway project. It is located at 18 km from Tada, 100 km from Nellore, 26 km from Satyavedu, and 55 km from Chennai.Various buses pass through GNT road from Tirupati, Srikalahasti, Nellore, Naidupeta, Sullurpeta to Madhavaram Mofussil Bus Terminus (MMBT) and Chennai Mofussil Bus Terminus (CMBT). Elavur railway station is located between Chennai–Kolkata rail road stretch trains towards Chennai Central to Sullurpeta and Chennai Central to Nellore trains. Near by railway station is Gummidipoondi located. Most of TNSTC, APSRTC and TSRTC Buses are well connected to Chennai, Ponneri, Srikalahasti, Nellore, Naidupeta, Sullurpeta through Elavur.

== Educational institutions ==
Schools

- Sri Jayaram Institute of Engg & Technology.
- Valliammaala CBSE school,
- Vivekandha Matric. Hr. Sec. School,
- Govt. Hr. Sec School
- Sagunthalammal Matric School.

== Languages ==
Tamil is the official language for the people of Elavur and besides that people will speak Telugu, Hindi, Odia.

== Demographics ==
According to the 2011 census of India, Elavur has 1452 households. The effective literacy rate (i.e. the literacy rate of population excluding children aged 6 and below) is 59.64%.

Demographics (2011 Census)
	Total	Male	Female
Population	5390	2788	2602
Children aged below 6 years	658	345	313
Scheduled caste	661	327	334
Scheduled tribe	116	59	57
Literates	2822	1716	1106
Workers (all)	2599	1716	883
Main workers (total)	2110	1504	606
Main workers: Cultivators	556	419	137
Main workers: Agricultural labourers	808	436	372
Main workers: Household industry workers	16	12	4
Main workers: Other	730	637	93
Marginal workers (total)	489	212	277
Marginal workers: Cultivators	21	8	13
Marginal workers: Agricultural labourers	405	159	246
Marginal workers: Household industry workers	6	2	4
Marginal workers: Others	57	43	14
Non-workers	2791	1072	1719
