= Sriharikota =

Island in Andhra Pradesh, India

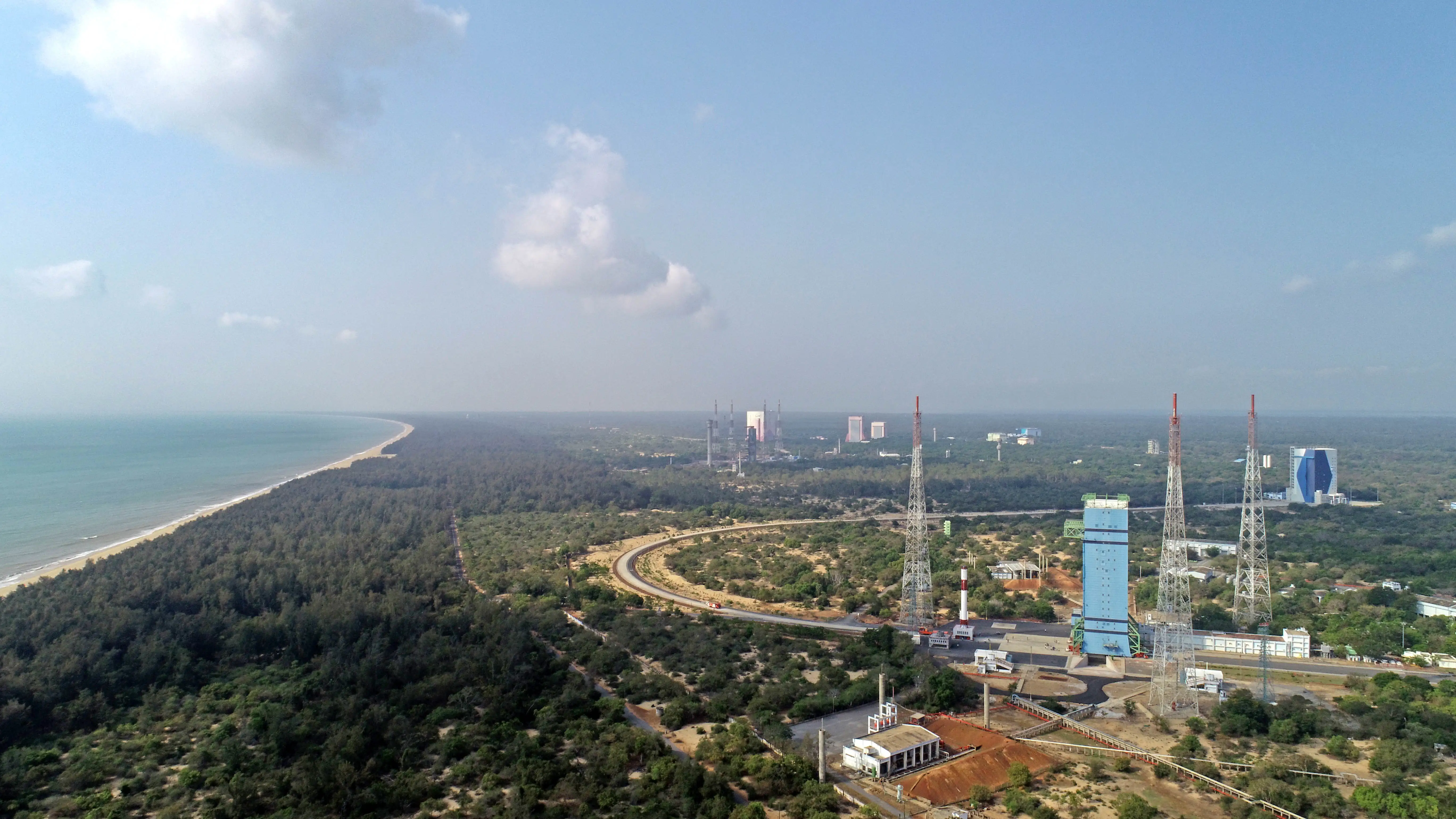
- Aerial view of the SDSC on the island
- Nickname: SDSC
- Location within Andhra Pradesh
- Coordinates: 13.7°N 80.2°E
- Country: India
- State: Andhra Pradesh
- District: Tirupati district
- Elevation: 1 m (3.3 ft)

Languages
  - Official: Telugu
  - Other: Hindi; Tamil; English
- PIN: 524124
- Vehicle registration: AP

Sriharikota (Telugu: [ʃriːhɐɾikoːʈɐ]) is a barrier island off the Bay of Bengal coast located in the Shar Project settlement of Tirupati district in Andhra Pradesh, India. It houses the Satish Dhawan Space Centre, one of the two satellite launch centres in India (the other being SSLV Launch Complex, Kulasekarapattinam). ISRO launches satellites using multistage rockets such as the PSLV and the GSLV from the island. Sriharikota was selected by ISRO because of its proximity to the equator, it gives extra centripetal force from the rotation of Earth.

== Location ==
Sriharikota Island

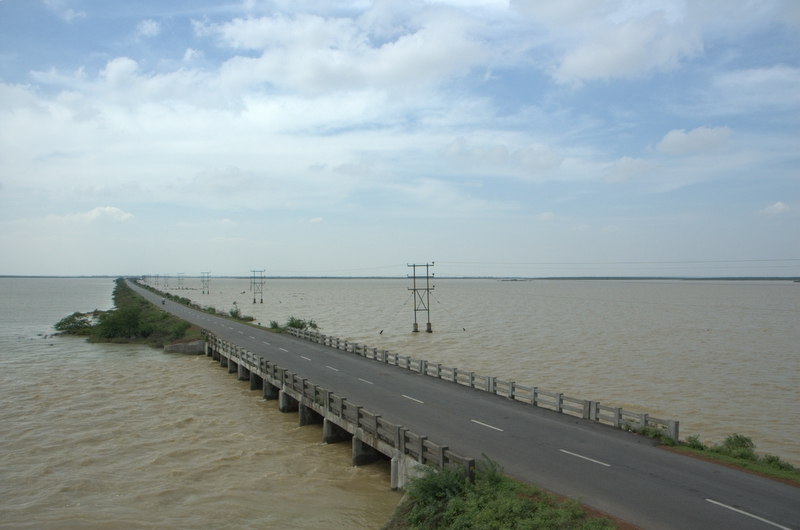
Pulicat Lake near Sriharikota

Sriharikota is partly situated in Sullurpeta mandal and partly located in Tada mandal in Tirupati District in Andhra Pradesh. The island divides Pulicat Lake from the Bay of Bengal. The nearest town and railway station is Sullurpeta which is 16 km west of Sriharikota and nearest cities are Tirupati and Chennai. A 16 km elevated road connects Sriharikota to the mainland.

== Climate ==
The climate of Sriharikota is tropical wet and dry. It is classified as Aw; bordering on As according to the Köppen–Geiger climate classification system. Sriharikota has hot summers and mild winters. Summers can reach up to 38 degrees Celsius, while winters can reach down to 20 degrees Celsius. Since Sriharikota is only 105 km north of Chennai, its climate is similar to that of Chennai.

Climate data for Sriharikota
Month	Jan	Feb	Mar	Apr	May	Jun	Jul	Aug	Sep	Oct	Nov	Dec	Year
Mean daily maximum °C (°F)	29.6 (85.3)	31.5 (88.7)	33.6 (92.5)	36 (97)	38.8 (101.8)	38 (100)	35.6 (96.1)	35.2 (95.4)	34.5 (94.1)	32.3 (90.1)	29.6 (85.3)	28.8 (83.8)	33.6 (92.5)
Daily mean °C (°F)	24.6 (76.3)	26 (79)	28.1 (82.6)	30.9 (87.6)	33.4 (92.1)	32.8 (91.0)	31 (88)	30.7 (87.3)	30 (86)	28.3 (82.9)	26 (79)	24.6 (76.3)	28.9 (84.0)
Mean daily minimum °C (°F)	19.7 (67.5)	20.6 (69.1)	22.7 (72.9)	25.8 (78.4)	28 (82)	27.9 (82.2)	26.5 (79.7)	26.2 (79.2)	25.6 (78.1)	24.4 (75.9)	22.4 (72.3)	20.2 (68.4)	24.2 (75.5)
Average precipitation mm (inches)	25 (1.0)	11 (0.4)	5 (0.2)	15 (0.6)	58 (2.3)	95 (3.7)	137 (5.4)	182 (7.2)	197 (7.8)	274 (10.8)	325 (12.8)	179 (7.0)	1,503 (59.2)
Source: Climate-Data.org, altitude: 1m

== See also ==
- ISRO
- Kulasekarapattinam
