= Kota mandal =

Mandal in Nellore district, Andhra Pradesh, India

- Mandal
- Interactive map of Kota mandal
- Location in Andhra Pradesh, India Kota mandal (India)
- Coordinates: 14°1′30″N 80°2′30″E
- Country: India
- State: Andhra Pradesh
- District: Nellore
- Headquarters: Kota

Area
  - Mandal: 182.27 km^{2} (70.37 sq mi)

Population (2011)
  - Mandal: 55,226
  - Density: 302.99/km^{2} (784.74/sq mi)
  - Urban: 0
  - Rural: 55,226

Languages
  - Official: Telugu
- Time zone: UTC+5:30 (IST)
- Vehicle registration: AP

Kota mandal is one of the mandal in Nellore district of the state of Andhra Pradesh in India. Its headquarters are located at Kota. The mandal is bounded by Muthukur mandal, Chillakur, Ojili, Chittamur, Vakadu mandals and it also borders Tirupati district.

== Demographics ==
Religions in Kota mandal (2011)
Religion	Percent
Hindus	94.83%
Muslims	4.27%
Christians	0.67%
Others or not stated	0.23%
Distribution of religions

As of 2011 census, the mandal had a population of 55,226. The total population constitute 28,337 males and 26,889 females —a sex ratio of 949 females per 1000 males. 5,496 children are in the age group of 0–6 years, of which 2,773 are boys and 2,723 are girls —a ratio of 982 per 1000. Scheduled Castes and Scheduled Tribes constitute 16,505 and 8,963 respectively. The average literacy rate stands at 66.07% with 71.8% among males and 60.08% among females.

== Administration ==
Kota mandal was a part of Nellore district until 2022. It was made part of the newly formed Tirupati district effective from 4 April 2022. It is a part of Gudur revenue division

== Towns and villages ==
Kota is the most populated settlement and Illukurupadu is the least populated settlement in the mandal. As of 2011 census, the mandal has 19 settlements, that includes:

Village
Allampadu
Chendodu
Chittodu
Gudali
Illukurupadu
Karlapudi
Kesavaram
Kota
Kothapalem
Kothapatnam
Venkanapalem (Lakshmakka Khandriga)
Maddali
Nellorepalle
Putchalapalle
Rudravaram
Siddavaram
Thinnelapudi
Uthamanellore
Vanjivaka

Sources:

- Census India 2011 (sub districts)
- Revenue Department of AP

== Politics ==
Kota mandal is a part of Gudur Assembly constituency and Tirupati Lok Sabha constituency. As of 1 January 2018, the mandal had 29,925 eligible voters with 14,822 male voters and 15,103 female voters.
