= Özel =

Özel is a Turkish name and may refer to:

== Given name ==
- Özel Türkbaş (1938–2012), Turkish actress, model, singer and belly dancer

== Surname ==
- Alena Özel-Hurkova (born 1984), Belarusian female volleyball player
- Feryal Özel (born 1975), Turkish-American astrophysicist
- İsmet Özel (born 1944), Turkish poet
- Mesut Özil (born 1988), German professional footballer
- Necdet Özel (born 1950), Turkish general
- Özge Özel (born 1991), Turkish women's footballer
- Özgür Özel (born 1974), Turkish politician
- Yeliz Özel (born 1980), Turkish female handball player

== Others ==
- Özel Çag Lisesi schools, international schools located in Turkey
  - TEV İnanç Türkeş Özel Lisesi
- Özel Jandarma Komando Bölüğü, the special forces unit of the Turkish Jandarma

== See also ==
- Ozil
