= Sunnambukulam =

Village in Thiruvallur, Tamil Nadu, India

Coordinates: 13.483834°N 80.145827°E

Sunnambukulam is a village located near Pulicat Lake in the Thiruvallur district of Tamil Nadu, India.

It has an important place in the history of South India, as a traditional source of lime (Sunnambu) for the region, and thus the name Sunnambukulam (which literally means pond of slaked lime).
