= Satyavedu =

- Town
- Location in Andhra Pradesh, India Satyavedu (India)
- Coordinates: 13.437°N 79.956°E
- Country: India
- State: Andhra Pradesh
- District: Tirupati
- Mandal: Satyavedu

Government
  - Body: Tirupati Urban Development Authority

Population
  - Total: 52,979

Languages
  - Official: Telugu
  - Other: Tamil
- Time zone: UTC+5:30 (IST)
- Postal code: 517588
- Vehicle registration: AP

Satyavedu is a town in Tirupati district and was earlier part of the Chittoor district of the Indian state of Andhra Pradesh. It borders the state of Tamil Nadu on its southern part of the state and is located just 60 km north of the Chennai metropolitan city. It is also connected with Sri City on its exterior area. It is one of mandals in Sullurupeta revenue division and headquarters of Satyavedu mandal.

== Demographics ==
In the 2011 census, the town had a total population of 52,979, comprising 25,995 males and 28,984 females. It is a part of Satyavedu Constituency, which has a total population of 277,010.
