= Naidupeta mandal =

Naidupeta నాయుడుపేట మండలం
- Mandal
- Interactive map of Naidupeta
- Location in Andhra Pradesh, India
- Coordinates: 13.9000°N 79.9000°E
- Country: India
- State: Andhra Pradesh
- District: Tirupati
- Headquarters: Naidupeta

Population (2011)
  - Total: 79,648

Languages
  - Official: Telugu
- Time zone: UTC+5:30 (IST)

Naidupeta mandal (Telugu: నాయుడుపేట మండలం) is one of the 36 mandals in Tirupati district of the state of Andhra Pradesh, India. Its headquarters are located at Naidupeta. The mandal is bounded by Balayapalle, Ojili, Pellakur, Doravarisatram and Chittamur mandals.

== Demographics ==
As of 2011 census, the mandal had a population of 79,648. The total population constitute, 39,633 males and 40,015 females —a sex ratio of 1010 females per 1000 males. 7,979 children are in the age group of 0–6 years, of which 4,055 are boys and 3,924 are girls —a ratio of 968 per 1000. The average literacy rate stands at 72.77% with 52,150 literates.

== Towns and villages ==
Vinnamala is the most populated and Lankapalem is the least populated settlement in the mandal. As of 2011 census, the mandal has 34 settlements, that includes the following towns and villages:

1. Annamedu
2. Aravaperimidi
3. Athalapalem
4. Ayyapareddipalem
5. Bheemavaram
6. Biradawada
7. Chigurupadu
8. Chigurupadu Agraharam
9. Chillamathur
10. Dwarakapuram
11. Gottiprolu
12. Juvvalapalem
13. Kallipedu
14. Kapuluru
15. Karumanchivari Khandrik
16. Konetirajupalem
17. Kuchiwada
18. L.A.Sagaram
19. Lankapalem
20. Marlapalle
21. Menakuru
22. Madapalam
23. Naidupeta
24. Palepolam
25. Pandluru
26. Puderu
27. Puduru
28. Ravulagunta
29. Thannamala
30. Thimmaji Khandrika
31. Thummur (R)
32. Vaddigunta Khandrika
33. Vengamambapuram
34. Vinnamala
35. Yerramsettipalem

== See also ==
- Tirupati district
