= Venadu, Tada mandal =

Coordinates: 13°38′N 80°08′E

Venadu
- Village
- Interactive map of Venadu
- Location in Andhra Pradesh, India
- Country: India
- State: Andhra Pradesh
- District: Tirupati
- Mandal: Tada

Languages
  - Official: Telugu; Tamil
- Time zone: UTC+5:30 (IST)

Venadu is an island village in Tada mandal, Tirupati district of the Indian state of Andhra Pradesh. It is surrounded by Pulicat Lake.
