= Ozil =

Özil (pronounced [œˈzil]]) is a Turkish surname constructed by fusing the Turkish words Öz ("self", "essence", "extract") and İl ("city", "province").

== Surname ==
- Ozil de Cadartz, French troubadour
- Mesut Özil (born 1988), German footballer

== Others ==
- Ozili or Ojili, a Mandal in Nellore district in the state of Andhra Pradesh in India.
- Ozillac, a commune in the Charente-Maritime department in the Nouvelle-Aquitaine region in southwestern France.

== See also ==
- Özel
