= Vakadu mandal =

Mandal in Tirupati district, Andhra Pradesh, India

- Mandal
- Interactive map of Vakadu mandal
- Location within Andhra Pradesh Location within India
- Coordinates: 13°59′53″N 80°03′40″E
- Country: India
- State: Andhra Pradesh
- District: Tirupati
- Revenue division: Sullurupeta

Area
  - Mandal: 235.56 km^{2} (90.95 sq mi)

Population (2011)
  - Mandal: 37,695
  - Density: 160.02/km^{2} (414.46/sq mi)
  - Urban: 37,695
  - Rural: 0
- Time zone: UTC+05:30 (IST)

Vakadu mandal is one of the 34 mandals in Tirupati district in the Indian state of Andhra Pradesh. It is a part of Sullurupeta revenue division.

== History ==
Vakadu mandal used to be a part of Nellore district and was made part of the newly formed Tirupati district on 4 April 2022.

== Demographics ==
Religions in Vakadu mandal (2011)
| Religion | Percent |
| Hindus | 92.15% |
| Muslims | 6.91% |
| Christians | 0.74% |
| Others or not stated | 0.2% |
Distribution of religions

As per 2011 census, Vakadu mandal had a total population of 37,695 with 19,082 male population and 18,613 female population with a density of 160/km^{2}. Scheduled Castes and Scheduled Tribes made up 14,760 and 5,414 of the population respectively. It had a literacy rate of 60.54% with 66.42% among males and 54.48% among females.

== Biodiversity ==
Vakadu mandal has brackish water ecosystem. Every year, terrestrial and aquatic birds migrate to Pulicat Lake area for a temporary stay. The ecosystem covers an area of 600 km^{2} (230 sq mi) including parts of the mandal along with Chittamur, Doravarisatram, Sullurpeta and Tada mandals. The terrestrial birds include painted storks, large egrets, little egrets, grey pelicans, grey herons; water birds include northern pintails, black-winged stilts, northern shovelers, common teal, seagulls, terns, sandpipers, and common coots.

== Administration ==
Vakadu mandal is a part of Gudur revenue division. As of 2011 census, the mandal comprises the following 41 villages:

Village
Andalamala
Budidalawagu
Cheemalapadu
Chennappagarimitta*
Cherukumulam*
Duggaraja Patnam
Durgavaram
Ganganapalem
Gundlu
Iskamattu
Jaminkothapalem
Juvvinattu
Kalluru
Kapparampadu*
Kasipuram
Kodiwaka
Kondapuram
Konduru
Kotha Cheruvu @ Sahebulapalem
Manyalanattu
Molaganur
Muttembaka
Nagulamarri*
Namkadu Bit - I*
Namkadu Bit - II*
Nellipudi
Pamanji
Pambali
Pathetipalem
Pedda Cheruvu*
Pollakhandrika*
Pudilayadoruvu
Pulikorru @ Balireddipalem
Reddipalem Bit - I
Reddipalem Bit - II
Tirumur
Uttara Polam*
Vagarru @ Tupilipalem
Vakadu
Valamedu
Yaragatipalle

- Note: Chennappagarimitta, Cherukumulam, Kapparampadu, Nagulamarri, Namkadu Bit - I, Namkadu Bit - II, Pedda Cheruvu, Pollakhandrika and Uttara Polam were uninhabited

== Politics ==
Vakadu mandal is a part of Gudur Assembly constituency and Tirupati Lok Sabha constituency. As of 1 January 2018, the mandal had 24,483 eligible voters with 11,979 male voters and 12,504 female voters.
