= Irukkam Island =

Indian lagoon-lake-island

Coordinates: 13.570°N 80.148°E

Irukkam is a lake island located in the middle of Pulicat Lake in Tada Mandal. Tirupati district ( Earlier SPSR Nellore District) of Andhra Pradesh. It is located 6 km from Arambakkam. In recent times, Irukkam has emerged as a popular island resort owing to its proximity to Chennai. Irukkam was under Sullurupeta Assembly Constituency. Tirupati loksabha Constituency. Irukkam is land of diversity in culture & Traditions. Representing Telugu & Tamil customs. Irukkam Island People was facing Problems in Transportation.

== Transportation ==
Irukkam is located nearly 8 kilometers from Arambakkam. Transportation to the island is only possible by boat.
