= Doravarisatram mandal =

Mandal in Tirupati district, Andhra Pradesh, India

- Mandal
- Interactive map of Doravarisatram mandal
- Location within Andhra Pradesh Location within India
- Coordinates: 13°48′33″N 79°57′5″E
- Country: India
- State: Andhra Pradesh
- District: Tirupati
- Revenue division: Sullurupeta

Area
  - Mandal: 268.91 km^{2} (103.83 sq mi)

Population (2011)
  - Mandal: 35,971
  - Density: 133.77/km^{2} (346.45/sq mi)
  - Urban: 0
  - Rural: 35,971
- Time zone: UTC+05:30 (IST)

Doravarisatram mandal is one of the 36 mandals in Tirupati district in the Indian state of Andhra Pradesh. It is a part of Sullurupeta revenue division.

== History ==
Doravarisatram mandal used to be a part of Nellore district under Gudur revenue division. On 25 June 2013, it was made part of the newly-formed Naidupeta revenue division. On 4 April 2022, the Government of Andhra Pradesh reorganized the districts in the state and the madal was made part of the Tirupati district under Sullurupeta revenue division, both newly-formed.

== Biodiversity ==
Doravarisatram mandal has brackish water ecosystem. Every year, terrestrial and aquatic birds migrate to Pulicat Lake area for a temporary stay. The ecosystem covers an area of 600 km^{2} (230 sq mi) including parts of the mandal along with Chittamur, Sullurpeta, Tada and Vakadu mandals. The terrestrial birds include painted storks, large egrets, little egrets, grey pelicans, grey herons; water birds include northern pintails, black-winged stilts, northern shovelers, common teal, seagulls, terns, sandpipers, and common coots.

== Demographics ==
Religions in Chillakur mandal (2011)
Religion	Percent
Hindus	95.44%
Muslims	3.74%
Christians	0.67%
Others or not stated	0.15%
Distribution of religions

As per 2011 census, Doravarisatram mandal had a total population of 35,971 with 18,120 male population and 17,851 female population with a density of 134/km^{2}, all living in rural areas. Scheduled Castes and Scheduled Tribes made up 14,520 and 4,191 of the population respectively. It had a sex ratio of 985. It had a literacy rate of 62.43% with 70.08% among males and 54.69% among females.

== Administration ==
The mandal is administrated as part of Sullurupeta revenue division. As of 2011 census, It comprises the following 45 villages:

Village
Adapamudi
Akkarapaka
Anegottam
Anepudi
Ayyapalem
Buduru
Buradamadugu
Chandanamudi
Damaraya Khandrika*
K. D. Khandrika*
Kalluru
Kalluru Khandrika
Karatamudi
Karikadu
Kattuvapalle
Kothapalle
Lingampadu
Mallayapalem
Maneri
Mavillapadu
Meezuru
Melupaka
Minamanamudi
Modugulapalem
Muchalagunta
Mylangam
Nelaballi
Nelapattu
Nellorepalle
P. Khandrika
Poolathota
Singanalathuru
Sridhanamalli
Suragunta Tagelu*
Surapu Agraharam
Tallampadu
Thaneyali
Thogaramudi
Utchuru
Vedurupattu
Velukadu
Vengamambapuram*
Venumbaka
Vetagiripalem
Yekollu

- Note: Damaraya Khandrika, K. D. Khandrika, Suragunta Tagelu and Vengamambapuram are uninhabited

== Politics ==
Chillakur mandal is a part of Sullurpeta Assembly constituency and Tirupati Lok Sabha constituency. As of 1 January 2018, Chillakur mandal had 23,414 eligible voters with 11,491 male voters and 11,923 female voters.
