= Doravarisatram =

- Village
- Interactive map of Doravarisatram
- Location in Andhra Pradesh, India Doravarisatram (India)
- Country: India
- State: Andhra Pradesh
- District: Tirupati
- Mandal: Doravarisatram

Population
  - Total: 2,043 as of 2,001

Languages
  - Official: Telugu
- Time zone: UTC+5:30 (IST)
- PIN: 524123
- Vehicle registration: AP

Doravarisatram is a village in Doravarisatram mandal Tirupati district in the state of Andhra Pradesh in India.
