= Chittamur mandal =

Mandal in Tirupati district, Andhra Pradesh, India

- Mandal
- Interactive map of Chittamur mandal
- Location within Andhra Pradesh Location within India
- Coordinates: 13°57′22″N 80°4′10″E
- Country: India
- State: Andhra Pradesh
- District: Tirupati
- Revenue division: Sullurpeta

Government
  - MLA: Varaprasad Rao Velagapalli (YSRCP)
  - MP: Maddila Gurumoorthy

Area
  - Mandal: 278 km^{2} (107 sq mi)

Population (2011)
  - Mandal: 40,241
  - Density: 145/km^{2} (375/sq mi)
  - Urban: 0
  - Rural: 40,241
- Time zone: UTC+05:30 (IST)

Chittamur mandal is one of the 34 mandals in Tirupati district in the Indian state of Andhra Pradesh. It is a part of Sullurupeta revenue division with its headquarters at Chittamur.

== History ==
Chittamur mandal was a part of Nellore district until 2022. It was made part of the newly formed Tirupati district effective from 4 April 2022 by the Y. S. Jagan Mohan Reddy-led Government of Andhra Pradesh.

== Biodiversity ==
Chittamur mandal has brackish water ecosystem. Every year, terrestrial and aquatic birds migrate to Pulicat Lake for a temporary stay. The ecosystem covers an area of 600 km^{2} (230 sq mi) including parts of the mandal along with Doravarisatram, Sullurpeta, Tada and Vakadu mandals. The terrestrial birds include painted storks, large egrets, little egrets, grey pelicans, grey herons; water birds include northern pintails, black-winged stilts, northern shovelers, common teal, seagulls, terns, sandpipers, and common coots.

== Demographics ==
Religions in Chittamur mandal (2011)
| Religion | Percent |
| Hindus | 96.75% |
| Muslims | 2.74% |
| Christians | 0.39% |
| Others or not stated | 0.12% |
Distribution of religions

As per 2011 census, Chittamur mandal had a total population of 40,241 with 20,503 male population and 19,738 female population with a density of 145/km^{2}. It had a sex ratio of 963. Scheduled Castes and Scheduled Tribes made up 16,035 and 5,905 of the population respectively. It had a literacy rate of 57.65% with 64.13% among males and 50.95% among females.

== Administration ==
Chittamur mandal is a part of Sullurupeta revenue division. Its headquarters are located at Chittamur. As of 2011 census, the mandal comprises the following 41 villages:

Village
Addepudi
Aruru
Buradagali Kothapalem
Chillamuru
Chittamur
Devuni Khandrika*
Ellore
Eswarawaka
Gangupalem*
Gollapalem
Gunupadu
Jalapeddipalem
Kalagurthipadu
Kogili
Kokkupalem
Kothapalem*
Kummarapalem
Mallam
Mangalavaripalle
Mannemala
Marlamudi Jangalapalle
Mettu
Molakalapudi
Mukkidipalem
Padarthivari Khandrika*
Palamparthy
Pellakuru
Perantravulamitta
Pittivanipalle
Pothunayanipalle*
Putragunta
Ranganathapuram
Rayareddipalem*
Somasamudram
Tadimedu
Uppalamarthi
Vadlavanipalle*
Varthur North
Veligajulapalle
Yakasiri
Yellasiri

- Note: Devuni Khandrika, Gangupalem, Kothapalem, Padarthivari Khandrika, Pothunayanipalle, Rayareddipalem and Vadlavanipalle were uninhabited

== Politics ==
Chittamur mandal is a part of Gudur Assembly constituency and Tirupati Lok Sabha constituency. As of 1 January 2018, the mandal had 29,607 eligible voters with 14,712 male voters and 14,895 female voters. Varaprasad Rao Velagapalli is representing the Gudur constituency as the Member of the Legislative Assembly (MLA) in Andhra Pradesh Legislative Assembly, and Maddila Gurumoorthy is representing the Tirupati constituency as the Member of Parliament (MP) in Lok Sabha.
