= Shar Project =

- Village
- Interactive map of Shar Project
- Location in Andhra Pradesh, India
- Coordinates: 13.7534°N 80.1987°E
- Country: India
- State: Andhra Pradesh
- District: Tirupati district
- Elevation: 5 m (16 ft)

Population (2011)
  - Total: 6,097

Languages
  - Official: Telugu
- Time zone: UTC+5:30 (IST)

Shar Project is a village in Sullurpeta mandal, of Tirupati district in the state of Andhra Pradesh located near the Bay of Bengal. The barrier island of Sriharikota housing the Satish Dhawan Space Centre is part of this settlement.

== Demographics ==
As of 2011 census, the village had a population of 6,097. The total population constitute, 3,191 males and 2,906 females —a sex ratio of 911 females per 1000 males. 1,500 children are in the age group of 0–6 years, of which 374 are boys and 321 are girls —a ratio of 858 per 1000. The average literacy rate stands at 70.51% with 4,133 literates, significantly higher than the state average of 67.41%.
