= Kota, Andhra Pradesh =

Kota
- village
- Interactive map of Kota
- Location in Andhra Pradesh, India
- Coordinates: 14.0333°N 80.0500°E
- Country: India
- State: Andhra Pradesh
- District: Nellore
- Mandal: Kota
- Elevation: 8 m (26 ft)

Languages
  - Official: Telugu
- Time zone: UTC+5:30 (IST)
- PIN: 524411
- Telephone code: +918624
- Vehicle registration: AP26

Kota is a village in Kota mandal, Nellore District in the state of Andhra Pradesh, India. It is the headquarters of the Kota mandal. It is one of 19 villages in the Kota mandal. Kota PIN code is 524411.
