= Chengalamma Parameshwari Temple =

Hindu temple in Andhra Pradesh, India

Sri Chengalamma Temple
- Sri Chengalamma Parameshwari
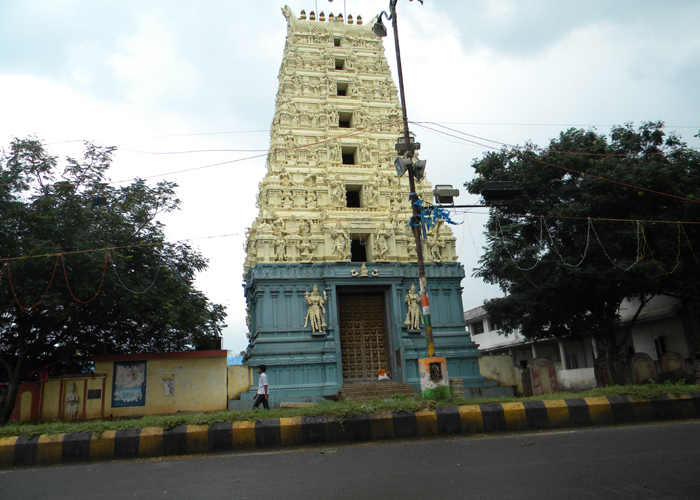

- Location in Andhra Pradesh

Religion
- Affiliation: Hinduism
- District: Tirupati
- Deity: Sri Chengalamma Parameshwari (Durga)

Location
- Location: Sullurpeta
- State: Andhra Pradesh
- Country: India
- Interactive map of Sri Chengalamma Temple
- Coordinates: 13°41′28.6″N 80°00′46.5″E

Website
- Sri ChengalammaTemple website

Chengalamma Parameshwari Temple is located in Sullurpeta town of Tirupati district in the Indian state of Andhra Pradesh. It is located at the southern tip of Sullurpeta, on the banks of Kalangi river.

The temple is situated 79 km, 84 km and 97 km from Chennai, Tirupati and Nellore respectively. It was established during the fourth and fifth centuries.

== Legend ==
The most intriguing aspect of the idol, the left-hand portion of the goddess depicts Parvati, the right-hand portion depicts Saraswati and the central portion depicts Sri Mahalakshmi. These features are the reason for the name Trikale Chengali. The Chola Pandita's was renowned for creating the idols of the goddess. Her icon here depicts an eight-armed form each holding a powerful weapon in a standing posture over the demon the elaborate and the incomparable aesthetics, thought that the Goddess was not only goddess Parvati, but also Mahakali.

Around the 10th century, the Chola Dynasty who ruled the region during that time, built a small hut to Sri Chengalamma by learning about goddess, who originated in the Kalangi River.

At initial, the goddess was called ′Tenkali (Dakshina Kali)′, later by ′Chengali′ and then to present name Chengalamma.

== History ==
The temple's history dates back to the 10th century.
