= Pellakur =

- Village
- Interactive map of Pellakur
- Location in Andhra Pradesh, India
- Coordinates: 13.8305399°N 79.8096502°E
- Country: India
- State: Andhra Pradesh
- Mandal: Pellakurl
- Elevation: 41 m (135 ft)

Languages
  - Official: Telugu
- Time zone: UTC+5:30 (IST)
- Vehicle registration: AP

Pellakur is a village and headquarters of Pellakur mandal in Tirupati district in the state of Andhra Pradesh in India.

== Geography ==
Pellakuru is located at 13.8333°N 79.8333°E. It has an average elevation of 41 meters (137 feet). Pellakuru is located in between Naidupet and Sri Kalahasthi.
