= Naidupeta =

Town in Andhra Pradesh, India

Naidupeta Nayudupeta
- Town
- Location in Andhra Pradesh, India
- Coordinates: 13.9000°N 79.9000°E
- Country: India
- State: Andhra Pradesh
- District: Tirupati
- Established: 2012

Government
  - Type: Municipality
  - Body: Naidupeta Municipality

Area
  - Total: 19.40 km^{2} (7.49 sq mi)

Population (2011)
  - Total: 45,055
  - Density: 2,322/km^{2} (6,015/sq mi)

Languages
  - Official: Telugu
- Time zone: UTC+5:30 (IST)
- PIN: 524 126
- Telephone code: +91–8623
- Vehicle registration: AP–39

Naidupeta is a town in Tirupati district of the Andhra Pradesh state of India. It also the mandal headquarters of Naidupeta mandal, and it is located in Sullurupeta revenue division. Naidupeta Town was located beside Swarnamukhi River

== Transport ==
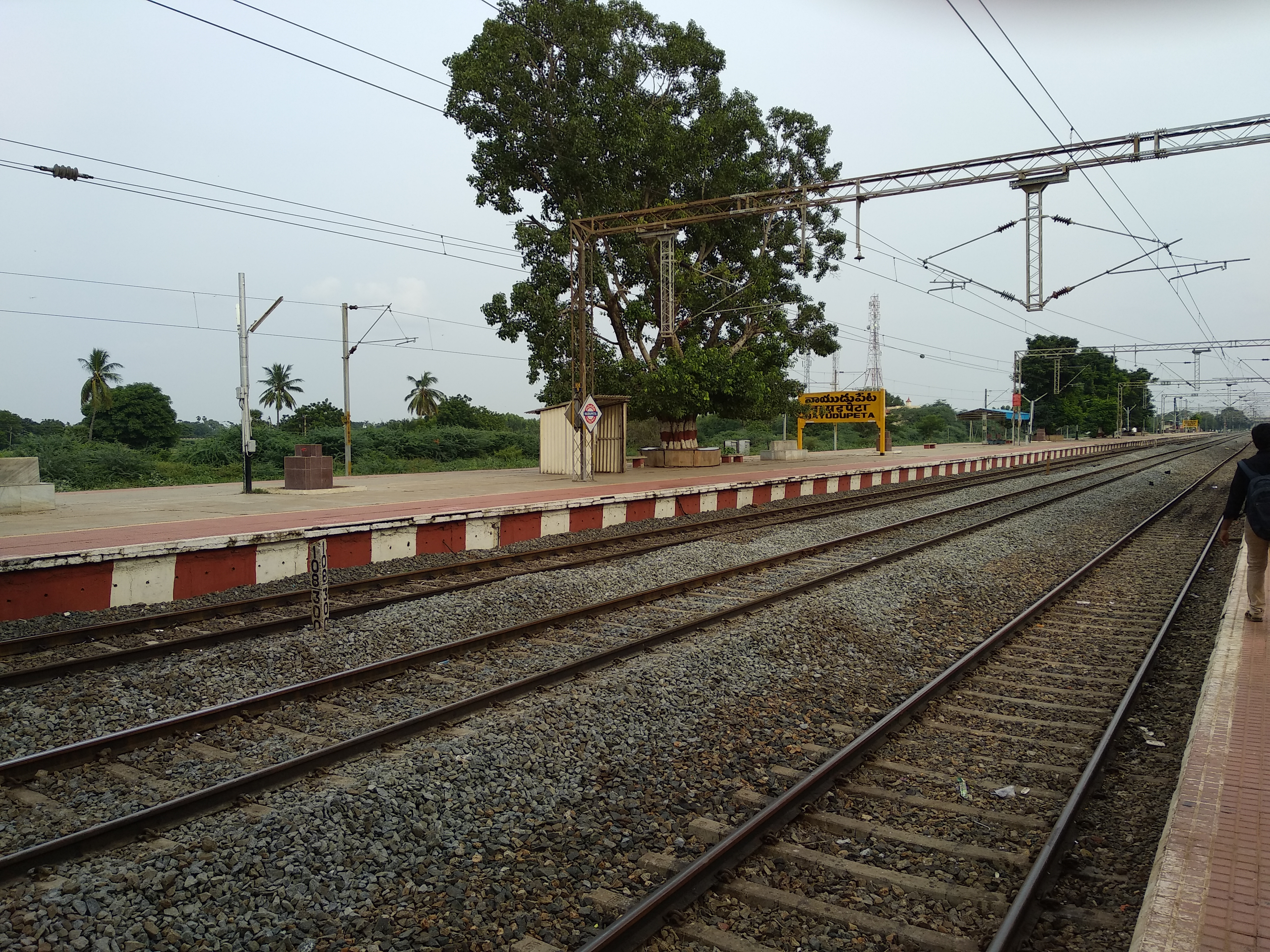
Naidupeta Railway station

The Andhra Pradesh State Road Transport Corporation operates bus services from Naidupet bus station under Sullurpeta Depot.

Naidupet has a railway station on Chennai - Vijayawada route operated by Southern Railways.

== New Development Projects and proposal ==
It appears that the AP government has a proposal to establish new MSME Parks in each constituency. In Sullurupeta constituency, there are indications of plans to develop a new park in Naidupeta town (assumed location), situated between Naidupeta Market and Thummuru. Currently, the feasibility and various options, such as land availability, are being evaluated. If this park is developed, it can provide numerous opportunities for youth and contribute to reducing unemployment.

== Road Connectivity and Proposed Highway Developments ==
The Puthalapattu–Naidupeta Corridor (SH‑61) is planned for a 4-lane upgrade along its approximately 117 km stretch, according to a feasibility study by APRDC. The World Bank report estimates the economic viability is strong with a rate of return of approximately 26.5%.

According to Sagarmala’s official project tracker, a 4-lane road from Naidupeta to Krishnapatnam Port is in DPR stage, with an estimated cost of ₹670 crore. Another project, a hinterland road from Naidupeta (Andhra Pradesh) to Krishnagiri (Tamil Nadu), is being planned with a budget of ₹3,000 crore.

The Naidupeta–Venkatagiri Connectivity Road project (under APRDC’s VCIC-DP, Package 04) proposes an 8.70 km road (6.485 km new formation) linking Naidupeta’s industrial area to NH‑16 at Thimmaji Kandriga. The plan also indicates around 68.10 acres of land acquisition, potentially affecting 248 families.
