= Alena Özel =

Belarusian volleyball player (born 1984)

Alena Özel-Hurkova
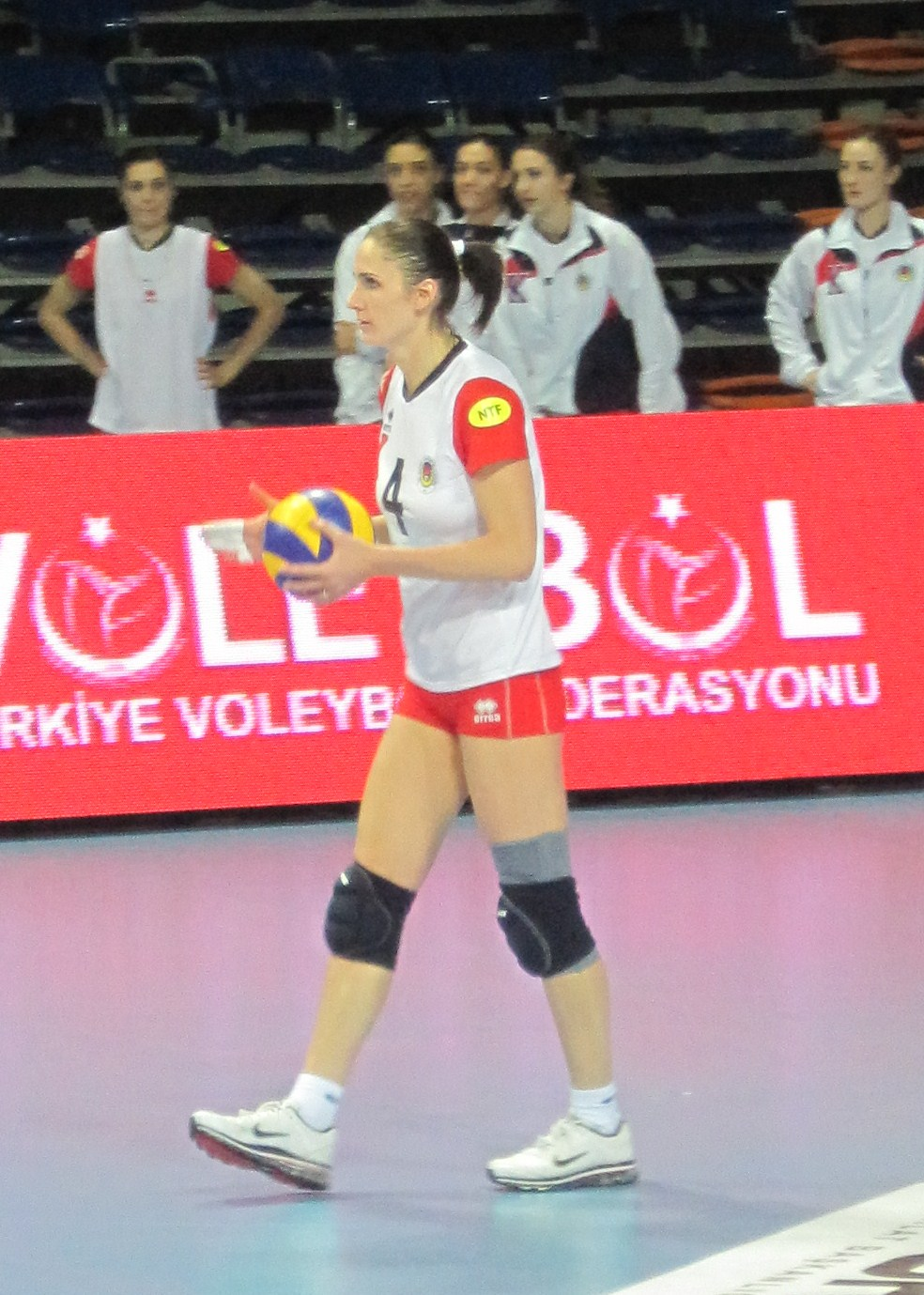

Personal information
- Nationality: Belarusian
- Born: 21 June 1984 (age 42)

Volleyball information
- Position: right side hitter
- Number: 11 (national team)

Career
Years	Teams
2007	Azərreyl Baku

National team
2007	Belarus

Alena Özel-Hurkova (born 21 June 1984) is a Belarusian former volleyball player, playing as a right side hitter. She was part of the Belarus women's national volleyball team.

She competed at the 2007 Women's European Volleyball Championship. On club level she played for Azərreyl Baku in 2007.
