= Arani River =

River in India

Coordinates: 13°23′N 80°19′E

The Arani, also known as Araniar or Araniyar, is a 108 km long river in India. It flows through the states of Tamil Nadu and Andhra Pradesh.

The river rises at Sadasivakonda at an elevation of 1,040 m above sea level in the Narayanavanam Protected Forest in the eastern slopes of the Eastern Ghats in Chittoor district, flows initially in a general southerly direction. It later flows in an easterly direction to join the southwest tip of the Pulicat Lake in Minjur Block, Tiruvallur district and then into the Bay of Bengal through tidal inlets after flowing in a 6-km long narrow lagoon separated by a barrier island. The Arani river basin is bounded by the Swarnamukhi river basin towards north, Kalangi and a minor river basin towards northeast, and Kortallaiyar (also called Kusasthali, Nagari and Kosasthalaiyar) river basin towards south and west. It lies in Karvetinagar, KVB Puram, Nagalapuram, Narayanavanam, Nindra, Pichatur, Puttur, Satyavedu, Vadamalapet, Vedurukuppam and Vijayapuram mandals of Chittoor district, a little in Tada mandal in Nellore district, and Ellapuram, Arani, Gummidipundi, Minjur, Poondi and Sholavaram blocks in Gummidipundi, Ponneri, Tiruvallur and Utukkottai taluks of Tiruvallur district in Tamil Nadu.

It has a drainage area of about 1535 km^{2} with over one half lying in Andhra Pradesh. The basin lies between north latitudes 13°15' and 13°32' and east longitudes 79°20' and 80°17' and is located in the Survey of India topographic maps 57 O and 66 C on a scale of 1:250,000 and 57 O/7, 57 O/10, 57 O/11, 57 O/15, 66 C/3 and 66 C/7 on a scale of 1:50,000.is a drainage map of the Arani river basin showing the characters of youth stage in the early course, mature stage in the middle course and old stage in the final course. The early stage is characterized by narrow, V-shaped and steeply-sloping valleys at high elevation and relief with vertical erosion exceeding lateral erosion, the middle stage with U-shaped valleys with narrow floodplain where lateral erosion exceeding vertical erosion, and the late stage by broad U-shaped valleys with wide floodplains, extreme lateral erosion and peneplanation. The whole basin is dotted with a number of irrigation reservoirs of varying sizes with most of them located in the old stage.

Arniar dam with 49 million cubic meters live storage capacity was constructed in the year 1958 to irrigate 2,230 hectares land in Chitoor district in Andhra Pradesh.
