= Sullurupeta revenue division =

Revenue division in Tirupati district, Andhra Pradesh, India

Sullurupeta revenue division సూళ్లూరుపేట ఆదాయ విభాగం
- revenue division in Tirupati district
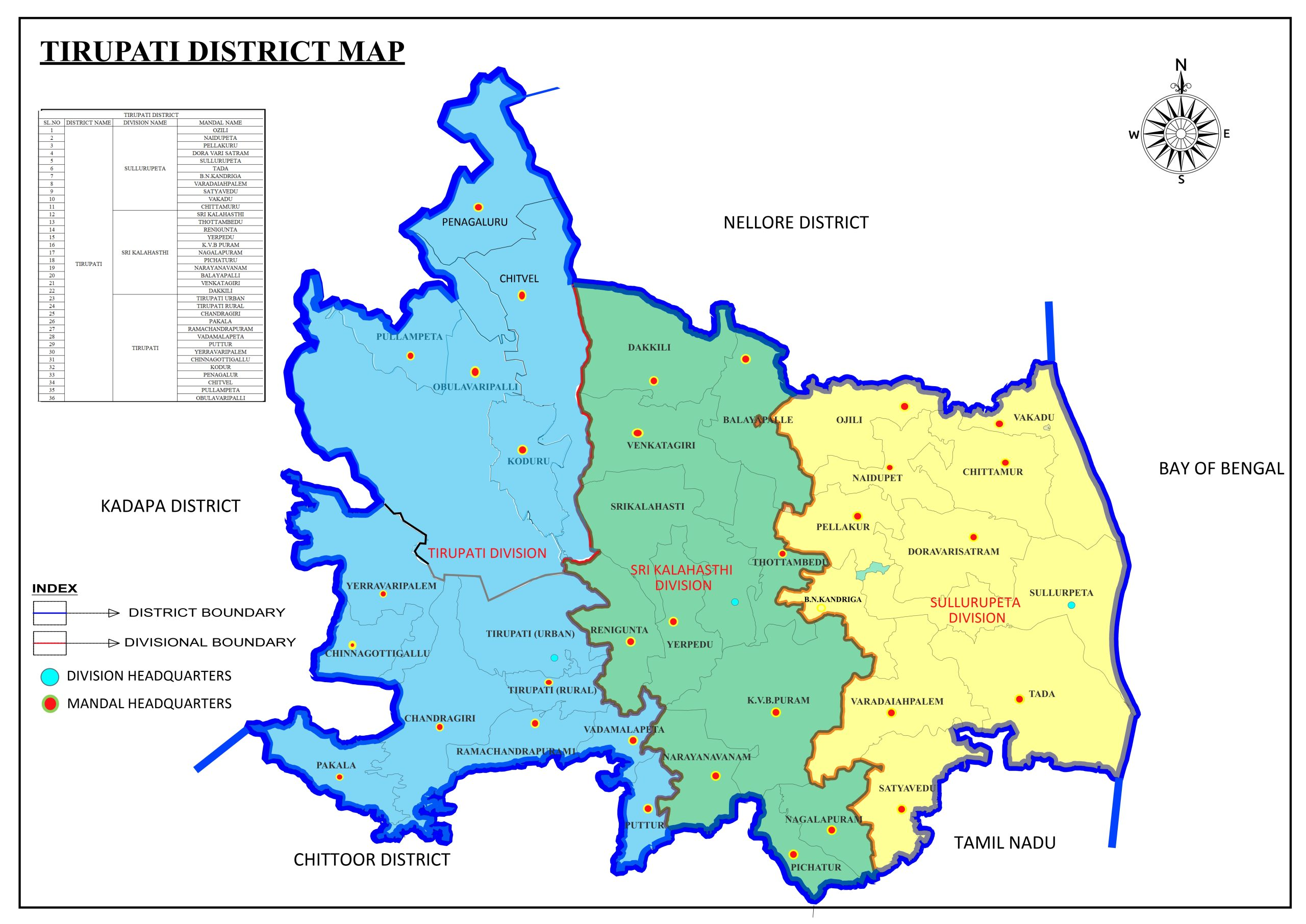
- Sullurupeta revenue division in Tirupati district
- Country: India
- State: Andhra Pradesh
- District: Tirupati
- Formed: 4 April 2022
- Founder: Government of Andhra Pradesh
- Headquarters: Sullurupeta
- Time zone: UTC+05:30 (IST)

Sullurupeta revenue division is an administrative division in the Tirupati district of the Indian state of Andhra Pradesh. It is one of the three revenue divisions in the district and comprises eleven mandals. The division was part of Nellore district and was made a part of the newly formed Tirupati district on 4 April 2022.

== Administration ==
The revenue division comprises eleven mandals: Buchinaidu Kandriga, Chittamur, Doravarisatram, Naidupeta, Ozili, Pellakur, Satyavedu, Sullurpeta, Tada, Vakadu and Varadaiahpalem.

== See also ==
- List of revenue divisions in Andhra Pradesh
- List of mandals in Andhra Pradesh
- Tirupati district
- Tirupati revenue division
- Srikalahasti revenue division
