= Özel Çağ High School =

International school in Yenice, Turkey

Coordinates: 36.9750°N 35.0677°E

Özel Çağ High School (Turkish: Özel Çağ Lisesi) is an international school located in Yenice, Turkey. It provides its services in different cities in Turkey including Tarsus, Adana, and Mersin.

== History ==
A.Yaşar Bayboğan founded Çağ College in 1986. Its campus covers a 125-acre (0.51 km^{2}) site. It is located on a main road between the cities of Adana and Mersin near Tarsus.

== Programs at Özel Çağ High School ==
The schools are private co-educational day schools. They accept students aged 6 to 17 years old. The educational programs at the schools are based on the national educational curriculum of Turkey. Math and science are taught in English though. Students in the last year of middle school take preparatory English Language classes. In high school, an English program is integrated for 3 years. The English classes are taught by native English speakers and Turkish English teachers. Saturday classes are offered from September to June and include math, science, and English. The schools also offer an extra academic program to prepare students for university entrance examinations as well as UCLES and international EFL and young learners examinations. Each year, at least 110 students take these exams.

== Special features ==
A multi-media system is used in most of the classrooms at the Özel Çağ High School. The school's facilities include

four science laboratories, a 35-student computer lab, an Internet-linked library, video rooms, a multi-purpose room, an indoor gymnasium, music and art rooms, a theatre hall seating over 300 equipped with LCD projection display, tennis and basketball courts, playing fields, an 800-seat dining hall and a football pitch.

== Notable alumni ==
Kıvanç Tatlıtuğ attended the school located in Yenice.

== Sources ==
=== Cited works ===
- bilgipare.com Biography
- List of Secondary Schools in Turkey
