= Vakadu =

Coordinates: 14°0′9.13″N 80°4′15.43″E

- Village
- Interactive map of Vakadu
- Location in Andhra Pradesh, India
- Country: India
- State: Andhra Pradesh
- District: Tirupati
- Mandal: Vakadu

Languages
- Time zone: UTC+5:30 (IST)
- PIN: 524415
- Telephone code: +91-8624

Vakadu is a village on the bank of Swarnamukhi river in the Indian state of Andhra Pradesh. It is located in Tirupati district and is a mandal headquarters of Vakadu mandal..

== Notable people ==
- N. Janardhana Reddy, former Chief Minister of Andhra Pradesh

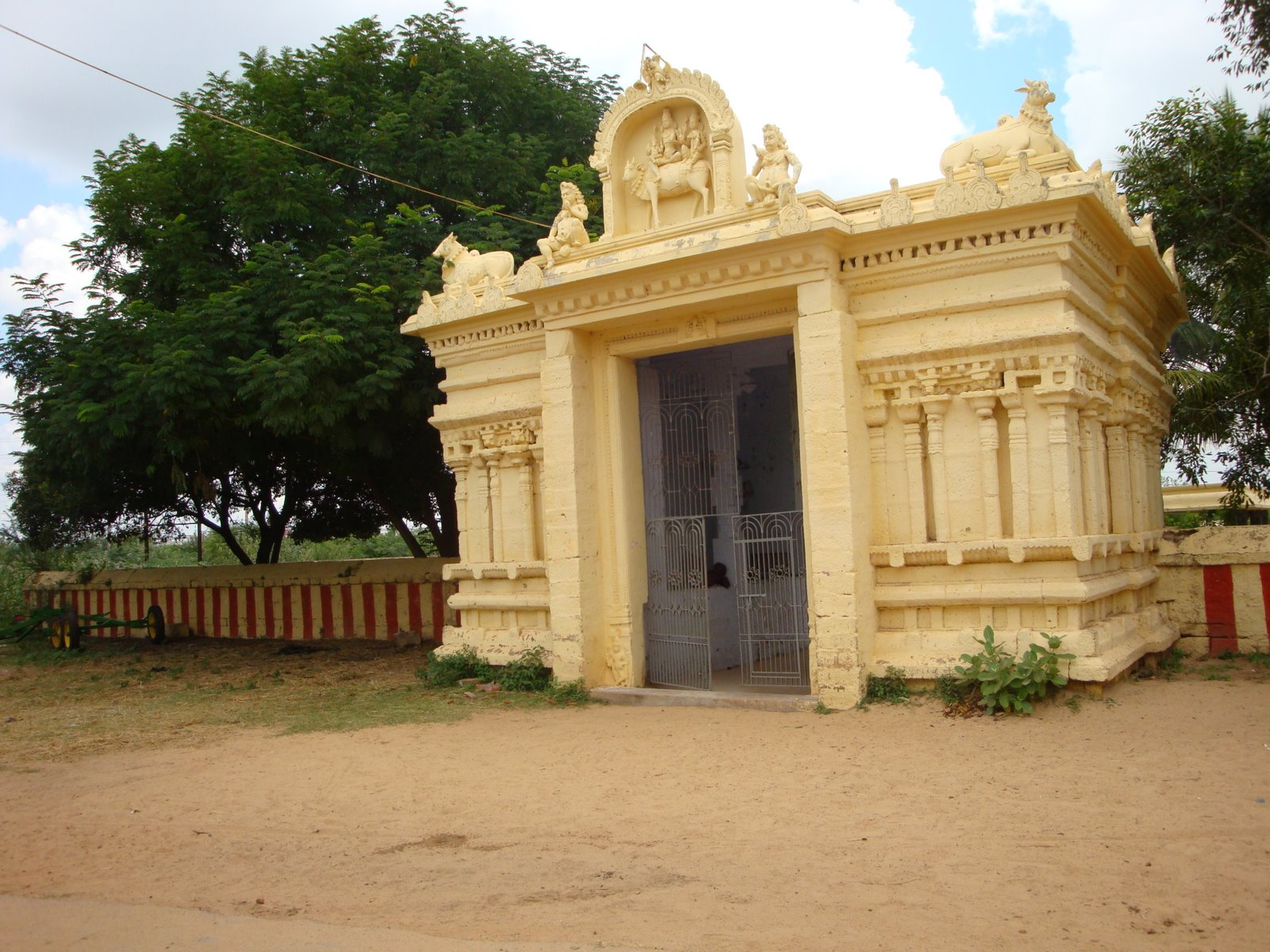
Entrance of NageswaraSwami Temple

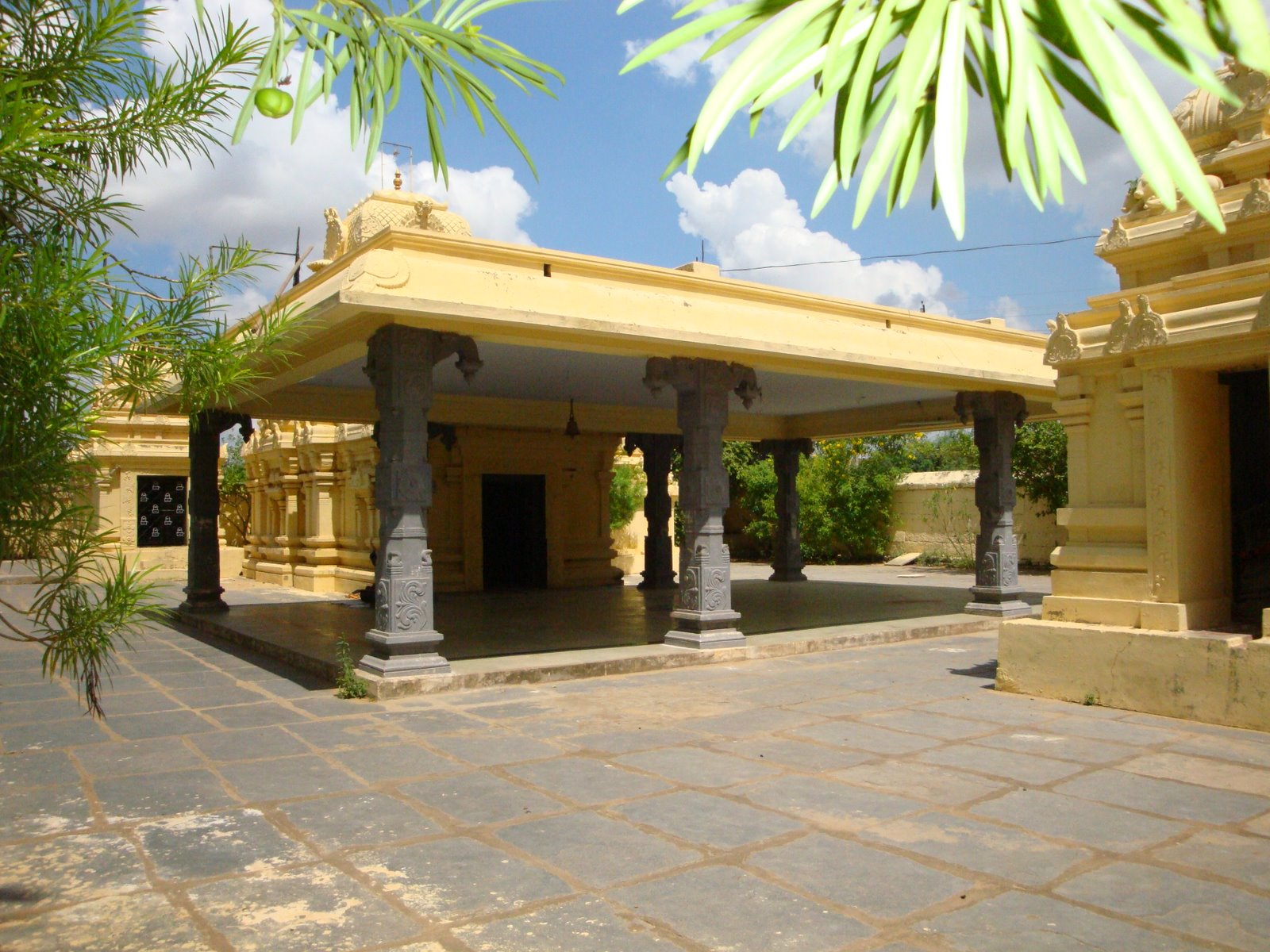
Sanctum sanctorum of NageswaraSwami Exterior view

== Bibliography ==
- Government of Madras (2004). Gazetteer of the Nellore District: Brought Upto 1938. Asian Educational Services. ISBN 978-81-206-1851-0.
