= Sullurpeta mandal =

- Mandal
- Interactive map of Sullurpeta mandal
- Location in Andhra Pradesh, India Sullurpeta mandal (India)
- Coordinates: 13.7000°N 80.0167°E
- Country: India
- State: Andhra Pradesh
- District: Tirupati
- Headquarters: Sullurpeta

Population (2011)
  - Total: 83,760

Languages
  - Official: Telugu
- Time zone: UTC+5:30 (IST)

Sullurpeta mandal is one of the 36 mandals in Tirupati district of the state of Andhra Pradesh, India. It is the headquarters of the Sullurupeta revenue division. The mandal is situated on the coast of Bay of Bengal, bounded by Vakadu, Chittamur, Doravarisatram and Tada mandals.

== Biodiversity ==
Sullurpeta mandal has brackish water ecosystem. Every year, terrestrial and aquatic birds migrate to Pulicat Lake area for a temporary stay. The ecosystem covers an area of 600 km^{2} (230 sq mi) including parts of the mandal along with Chittamur, Doravarisatram, Tada and Vakadu mandals. The terrestrial birds include painted storks, large egrets, little egrets, grey pelicans, grey herons; water birds include northern pintails, black-winged stilts, northern shovelers, common teal, seagulls, terns, sandpipers, and common coots.

== Demographics ==
As of 2011 census, the mandal had a population of 83,760. The total population constitute, 41,198 males and 42,562 females —a sex ratio of 1033 females per 1000 males. 8,719 children are in the age group of 0–6 years, of which 4,471 are boys and 4,248 are girls —a ratio of 950 per 1000. The average literacy rate stands at 73.31% with 55,009 literates.

== Towns and villages ==
Sulluru (Sullurpeta) is the most populated and Vatrapalem is the least populated settlement in the mandal. As of 2011 census, the mandal has 40 settlements, that includes the following towns and villages:

1. Abaka
2. Achukatla
3. Atakanithippa
4. Dama Nellore
5. Damaraya
6. Davadigunta
7. Degalapalem
8. Gopalareddipalem
9. Illupuru
10. Jangalapalle
11. K.C.Narasimhunigunta
12. Kadapatra
13. Kesavareddipalem
14. Komminenipalle
15. Konnembattu
16. Koridi
17. Kotapoluru
18. Kudiri
19. Kudiri Thippa Khandrika
20. Manga Nellore
21. Mangalampadu
22. Mannarupoluru
23. Mannemutheri
24. Mathakamudi
25. Nadenlavari Khandrika
26. Nookalapalem
27. Pandalagunta
28. Pantrangam
29. Ramachandragunta
30. Samanthamallam
31. Sarvareddi Khandrika
32. Shar Project
33. Suddamadugu Thagelu
34. Suggupalle
35. Sullurpeta (Sulluru)
36. Sulluru Japthikattubadi
37. Uggumudi
38. Vatrapalem
39. Velagalapannuru
40. Yerrabalem

Sources:

- Census India 2011 (sub districts)
- Revenue Department of AP
