= Tada mandal =

- Mandal
- Interactive map of Tada mandal
- Location in Andhra Pradesh, India Tada mandal (India)
- Coordinates: 13.5863°N 80.0365°E
- Country: India
- State: Andhra Pradesh
- District: Tirupati
- Headquarters: Tada

Population (2011)
  - Total: 46,468

Languages
  - Official: Telugu
  - Other: Tamil
- Time zone: UTC+5:30 (IST)

Tada mandal is one of the 36 mandals in Tirupati district of the state of Andhra Pradesh, India. Its headquarters are located at Tada. The mandal is situated on the coast of Bay of Bengal, bounded by Sullurpeta mandal of Tirupati district of Andhra Pradesh and also borders the state of Tamil Nadu.

== Biodiversity ==
Tada mandal has brackish water ecosystem. Every year, terrestrial and aquatic birds migrate to Pulicat Lake area for a temporary stay. The ecosystem covers an area of 600 km^{2} (230 sq mi) including parts of the mandal along with Chittamur, Doravarisatram, Sullurpeta and Vakadu mandals. The terrestrial birds include painted storks, large egrets, little egrets, grey pelicans, grey herons; water birds include northern pintails, black-winged stilts, northern shovelers, common teal, seagulls, terns, sandpipers, and common coots.

== Demographics ==
As of 2011 census, the mandal had a population of 46,468. The total population constitute, 23,309 males and 23,159 females —a sex ratio of 994 females per 1000 males. 5,201 children are in the age group of 0–6 years, of which 2,608 are boys and 2,593 are girls —a ratio of 994 per 1000. The average literacy rate stands at 64.74% with 26,714 literates.

== Towns and villages ==
Tada Khandrika is the most populated and Pallepalem is the least populated settlement in the mandal. As of 2011 census, the mandal has 40 settlements. They are as follows:

1. Akkampeta
2. Andagundala
3. Bheemulavaripalem
4. Gollalamuluvu
5. Graddagunta
6. Irakam
7. Kadaluru
8. Karijatha
9. Karur
10. Konduru
11. Mambattu
12. Pallepalem
13. Pannamgadu
14. Periavattu
15. Pudi
16. Pulivendra
17. Ramapuram
18. Tada
19. Tada Khandrika
20. Vatambedu
21. Venadu
22. Vendlurupadu

== See also ==
- Tirupati district
