= Sullurpeta =

Sullurupeta
- Town
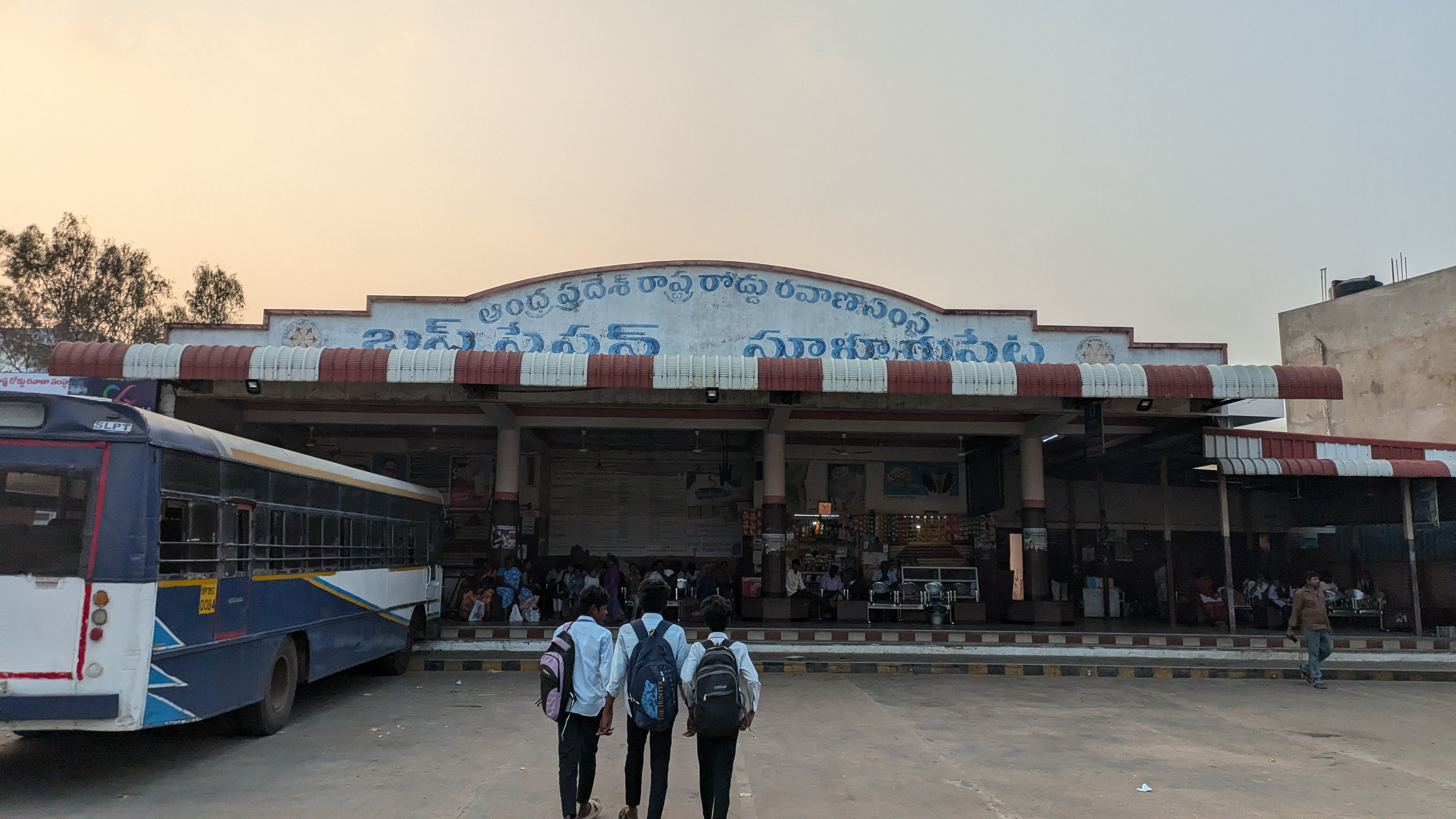
- Sullurupeta Bus Station

- Location in Andhra Pradesh, India
- Coordinates: 13.700°N 80.018°E
- Country: India
- State: Andhra Pradesh
- District: Tirupati
- Revenue division: Sullurupeta

Government
  - Type: Municipality
  - Body: Sullurpeta municipality

Area
  - Total: 16.04 km^{2} (6.19 sq mi)
- Elevation: 11 m (36 ft)

Population (2011)
  - Total: 27,504
  - Density: 1,715/km^{2} (4,441/sq mi)
- Time zone: UTC+5:30 (IST)
- PIN: 524 121
- Vehicle registration: AP 26

Sullurupeta is a town in Tirupati district of Andhra Pradesh, India. It is a municipality and the headquarters of Sullurpeta mandal and Sullurupeta revenue division. It serves as a gateway to Satish Dhawan Space Centre(SDSC) at Sriharikota.

== Geography ==
Sullurupeta is located about 77 km east of Tirupati, 90 km south of Nellore and about 83 km north of Chennai, Tamilnadu. It is 16 km west of the world-famous ISRO island Sriharikota, where the Indian rockets are launched. The Pulicat lake separates Sullurupeta and Sriharikota. It has an average elevation of 11 meters (36 feet).

== Nearby educational institutions ==
- Gokula Krishna College of Engineering, Sullurpeta
- Priyadarshini College of Engineering, Sullurpeta

== Attractions ==
- Chengalamma Parameshwari Temple, the Hindu Goddess deity has 400 years of history here and is located 1.5 km south of the Sullurupeta bus stand and north of the Kalangi river
- Pulicat Lake which lies to the east is a bird sanctuary attracting migratory birds, most notably flamingos, pelicans and storks.The area forming the sanctuary is under the administration of Andhra Pradesh Forest Department and Tamil Nadu Forest Department.
- Nelapattu Bird Sanctuary is located at 21.6 km far and is about 25min journey. It is famous for greater flamingos, pelicans, sea gulls, egrets, herons, a wide variety of ducks and kites.
- Ubbalamadugu Falls is located at 33.8 km far and is about 1hour journey

== Cinema ==
V Epiq in Sullurupeta is Asia's second largest and world's fourth largest cinema screen. it is 106 feet wide and has 670 seating capacity. This complex will have two more screens with 170 seats each. One of them will have Dolby Atmos advanced 3D surround sound with woofers fixed to every seat for a more mind-blowing experience. Apart from this, there will be an all-terrain vehicle track for the entertainment of the visitors. cost is Rs 80 crores and in seven and a half acres.

== Demographics ==
As of 2011 Census of India, Sullurupeta municipality had a population of 45,782. The total population constitute, 22,062 males and 23,720 females —a sex ratio of 1123 females per 1000 males. 2,612 children are in the age group of 0–6 years, of which 1,330 are boys and 1,282 are girls —a ratio of 964 per 1000. The average literacy rate stands at 83.64% with 20,819 literates, significantly higher than the state average of 67.41%. People can speak and understand Telugu and Tamil languages fluently due to the town's close proximity to the border of the Tamilnadu state.

== See also ==
- Sullurpeta mandal
