= Chittamur =

Chittamuru
- Village
- Interactive map of Chittamuru
- Location in Andhra Pradesh, India
- Coordinates: 13°56′05″N 80°01′47″E
- Country: India
- State: Andhra Pradesh
- District: Tirupati
- Talukas: Chittamuru

Languages
  - Official: Telugu
- Time zone: UTC+5:30 (IST)
- PIN: 524127
- Vehicle registration: AP

Chittamuru is a village and a Mandal in Tirupati district in the state of Andhra Pradesh in India.
