= Tada, Tirupati district =

Tada
- Mandal
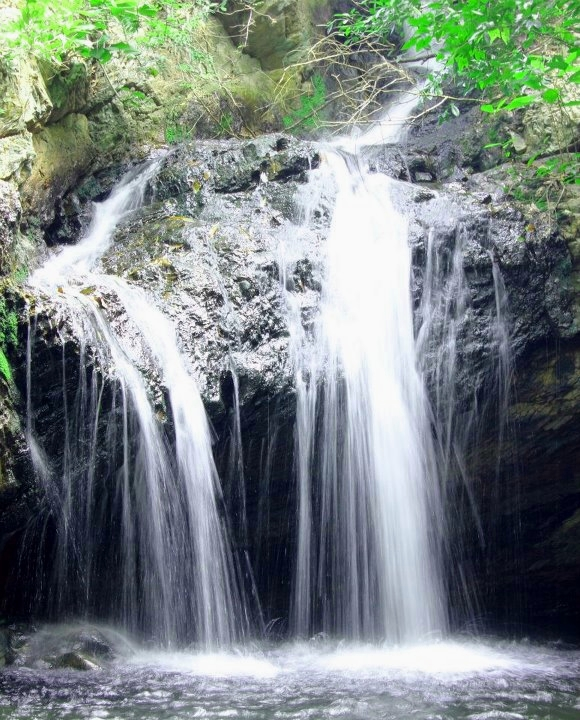
- Tada Falls near SriCity

- Location in Tamil Nadu, India Tada (India)
- Coordinates: 13.586311°N 80.036473°E
- Country: India
- State: Andhra Pradesh
- District: Tirupati district
- Time zone: UTC+5:30 (IST)
- PIN: 524401
- Telephone code: 08623
- Vehicle registration: AP 26
- Lok Sabha constituency: Tirupati
- Vidhan Sabha constituency: Sulurupeta

Tada is a place in Tirupati district of Andhra Pradesh And Nearest To Chennai City

== Transport ==
National Highway 16, a part of Golden Quadrilateral highway network, bypasses the village.
