= Ozili =

- village
- Interactive map of Ozili
- Location in Andhra Pradesh, India
- Coordinates: 14.003°N 79.905°E
- Country: India
- State: Andhra Pradesh
- District: Tirupati
- Mandal: Ozili mandal
- Established: 1812
- Founder: Pallava Rajas

Government
  - Body: ZPTC
- Elevation: 2,310 m (7,580 ft)

Population (10000)2,500
  - Total: 3,345
- Demonym: 3,000

Languages
  - Official: Telugu
- Time zone: UTC+5:30 (IST)
- Postal code: 524402
- Vehicle registration: AP26AE, AP26AV, AP39AM

Ozili or Ojili is a village and mandal headquarters in Tirupati district in the state of Andhra Pradesh in India.

== Transport ==
National Highway 16 passes through the town, which connects Kolkata and Chennai. The Andhra Pradesh State Road Transport Corporation operates bus services from Ojili bus station
