= Pulicat Lake =

Brackish water lagoon in India

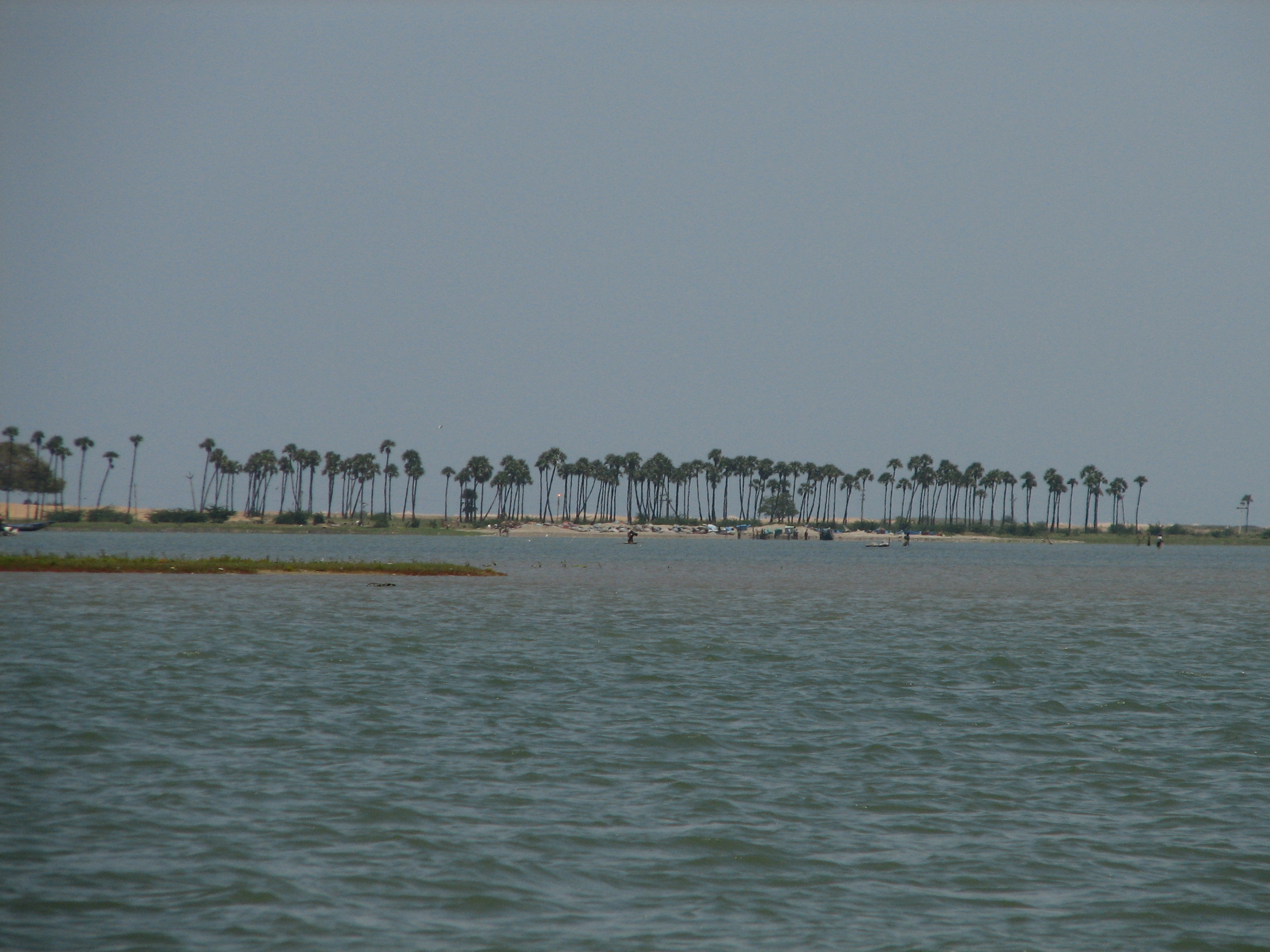
- Palm trees lining the barrier islands

- Location within Andhra Pradesh Location within Tamil Nadu Location within India
- Location: Coromandel Coast, Andhra Pradesh–Tamil Nadu border
- Coordinates: 13°33′57″N 80°10′29″E
- Type: brackish to salty
- Primary inflows: Arani River, Kalangi River and Swarnamukhi River
- Primary outflows: Bay of Bengal
- Basin countries: India
- Max. length: 60 km (37.3 mi)
- Max. width: 17.5 km (10.9 mi)
- Surface area: 250–450 km^{2} (97–174 mi^{2}) (from low tide to high tide)
- Average depth: 1 m (3.3 ft)
- Max. depth: 10 m (32.8 ft) at the mouth
- Islands: Irrukam, Venadu and several smaller ones
- Settlements: Sriharikota; Pulicat; Dugarājupatnam; Sullurpeta

Pulicat Lake is the second-largest brackish-water lagoon in India (after Chilika Lake), measuring 759 square kilometres (293 sq mi). A major part of the lagoon lies in the Tirupati district of Andhra Pradesh and rest with Thiruvallur district of Tamil Nadu. The lagoon is one of three important wetlands that attracts northeast monsoon rainclouds during the October-to-December season. The lagoon comprises the following regions: Pulicat Lake (Andhra Pradesh and Tamil Nadu), Marshy/Wetland Land Region (AP), Venadu Reserve Forest (AP), and Pernadu Reserve Forest (AP). The lagoon was cut across in the middle by the Sriharikota Link Road, which divided the water body into lagoon and marshy land. The lagoon encompasses the Pulicat Lake Bird Sanctuary. The barrier island of Sriharikota separates the lagoon from the Bay of Bengal and is home to the Indian Space Research Organisation's Satish Dhawan Space Centre.

== History ==
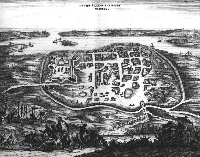
Sketch of Pellacata c. 1602

In the 1st century, the unnamed mariner who wrote Periplus of the Erythraean Sea recorded Podouke (Pulicat) as one of the three ports on the east coast of India. In the 2nd century, Ptolemy's list of ports on this coast included Podouke Emporion.

In the 13th century, Arabs migrated to the shores of the lagoon after they were banished from Mecca for refusing to pay tributes to a new caliph. Streets with dilapidated masonry houses once occupied by these Arab Muslims are still found in the area and resident families claim records in Arabic testifying the migration.

The Portuguese colonized the lagoon in 16th century, followed by the Dutch. The Dutch drifted to the lagoon as their ships got stuck on the shores of Karimanal village on the opposite side of the mouth of the lagoon. During the Dutch occupation, Pulicat was known by the name Pallaicatta. Fort Geldria dating to 1609, a church, a cemetery with tombs, and mausoleums constructed by the Dutch are protected by the Archaeological Survey of India (ASI). The Dutch transacted business with the British East India Company and other countries in the region.

A scientific study of the palynological characteristics of the lagoon was conducted by taking sedimentary soil samples from four test pits. It shows that the vegetational reconstruction from peat beds at 4.98 metres (16.3 ft) a.m.s.l. and 1 metre (3.3 ft) (a.m.s.l.) in the west at Sullurpeta and Kasdredinilem, respectively, is indicative of a palaeoshoreline. The sea level reached its maximum around 6650 ± 110 years BP in Sullurpeta, 18 kilometres (11 mi) west from the present shoreline. The radiocarbon dates of peat bed at Kasdreddinilem reveal an age of 4608 ± 122 years BP, indicating the shift in mangrove line eastwards during the regressive phase.

== Geography and topography ==
The lagoon's boundary limits range from 13.33° to 13.66° N and 80.23° to 80.25°E, with a dried part of the lagoon extending up to 14.0°N, with about 96% of the lagoon in Andhra Pradesh and 3% in Tamil Nadu. The lagoon is aligned parallel to the coast line with its western and eastern parts covered with sand ridges. The area of the lagoon varies with the tide, from 450 square kilometres (170 mi^{2}) at high tide to 250 square kilometres (97 mi^{2}) at low tide. Its length is about 60 kilometres (37 mi), and its width varies from 0.2 kilometres (0.12 mi) to 17.5 kilometres (10.9 mi). The climate of the lagoon's coastline is dominated by tropical monsoons. Its air temperature varies from 15 °C (59 °F) to 45 °C (113 °F). The large spindle-shaped barrier island named Sriharikota separates the lagoon from the Bay of Bengal. The sandy barrier islands of Irkam and Venad and smaller islands in the north are aligned north–south and divide the lagoon into eastern and western sectors. The morphology of the lagoons is categorized under four types, with large areas under mudflats and sandflats. The fishing village of Pulicat is at the south end of the lake. The Satish Dhawan Space Center is located on the north end of the island. Pulicat, Dugarājupatnam, and Sullurpeta are villages located on the periphery of the lagoon.

== Hydrology ==
Two rivers which feed the lagoon are the Arani River at the southern tip and the Kalangi River from the northwest, in addition to some smaller streams. The Buckingham Canal, a navigation channel, is part of the lagoon on its western side. The lagoon's water exchange with the Bay of Bengal is through an inlet channel at the north end of Sriharikota and an outflow channel of about 200 metres (660 ft) width at its southern end, both of which carry flows only during the rainy season. The lagoon acts as a buffer to retain the accumulated floodwater until the floodwater is discharged gradually to the sea during the monsoon period and cyclones. The lagoon and its river basins are located both in Andhra Pradesh and Tamil Nadu. The lagoon and its drainage river basins are interstate river basins as per the Interstate River Water Disputes Act of 1956. Most of the lagoon area, including its water outlet to the sea, is located in Andhra Pradesh.

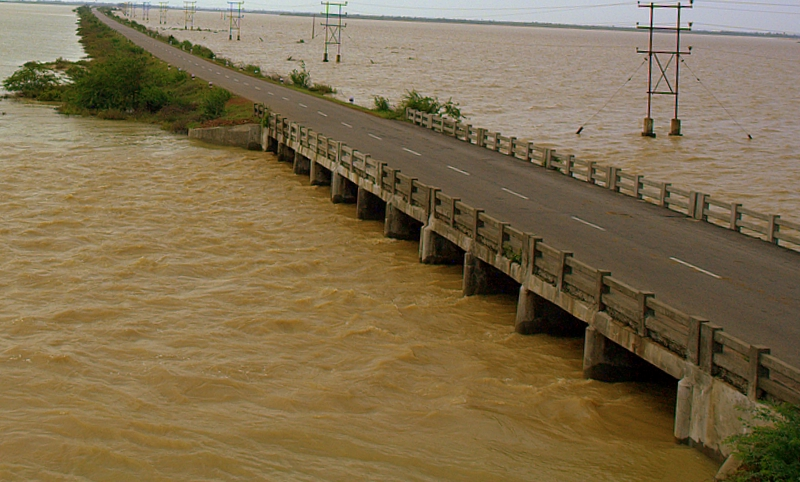
Pulicat Lake flooded due to rains

The water quality of the lagoon varies widely during various seasons – summer, pre-monsoon, monsoon and post-monsoon – as the depth and width of the lagoon mouth varies, causing a dynamic situation of mixing and circulation of waters. The resultant salinity variation and dissolved oxygen affects the primary production, plankton, biodiversity, and fisheries in this lagoon. Salinity values vary from zero during the monsoon to about 52,000 ppm (hypersaline) during the post- and pre-monsoon seasons. Adjustment to this wide variation is difficult for sessile and sedentary species in the lagoon. However, euryhaline species still dwell in the lagoon. The benthic or bottom habitat of this lagoon is classified into three zones: the southern zone is dominated by sand with some admixture of mud, the northern zone is wholly muddy, and the third zone with sand and mud in equal parts is overgrown with patches of weeds and is reported to be rich in benthic biodiversity. Toxicity levels of heavy metals such as magnesium, lead, zinc, nickel, cadmium, aluminum, and copper and chemicals such as ammonia, sulphate, and fluoride in the lagoon are well within permissible limits. Recently, the lagoon likely experienced up to 40% desalination due to the impact of freshwater floods from the 2015 South India floods.

== Flora and fauna ==
The lagoon has rich flora and fauna diversity, which supports active commercial fisheries and a large and varied bird population.

=== Limnology ===
Fishing is the major occupation in the many villages located around the lagoon periphery and on the islands. The lagoon has rich fish diversity, mostly marine species, some truly brackish-water, and a few freshwater species. Mullets and catfish are the major brackish-water fish, which have supported sustenance fishing for the lagoon fishermen. The lagoon is a nursery for several species of fish. Two thirds of the settlements in the lagoon area are in Tamil Nadu and the balance in Andhra Pradesh. 12,370 fishermen live on full-time fishery in the lagoon (6,000 in Andhra Pradesh and 6,370 in Tamil Nadu).

An average 1,200 tonnes of fish and crustaceans are harvested annually, of which prawns constitute 60%, followed by mullets. Seafood exports of white and tiger prawns, jellyfish, finfish, and live lagoon green crabs are also economic benefits from the lagoon. 168 total fish species are reported. The frequently found ones are the mullets: M. cunnesius, M. jerdoni, M. dussumieri, M. cephalus, M. bornensis and blowfish T. nigropunctatus, T. leopardus, Barbus dorsalis, catfish Macrones vittatus, sardines, Sardinella fimbriata and milk fish. Finfish, green crabs, clams and prawns are the most commercially exploited fishes of the lagoon. Endangered green sea turtles are found on the beaches of Sriharikota beach. Salt is also produced from the lagoon.

=== Avifauna ===
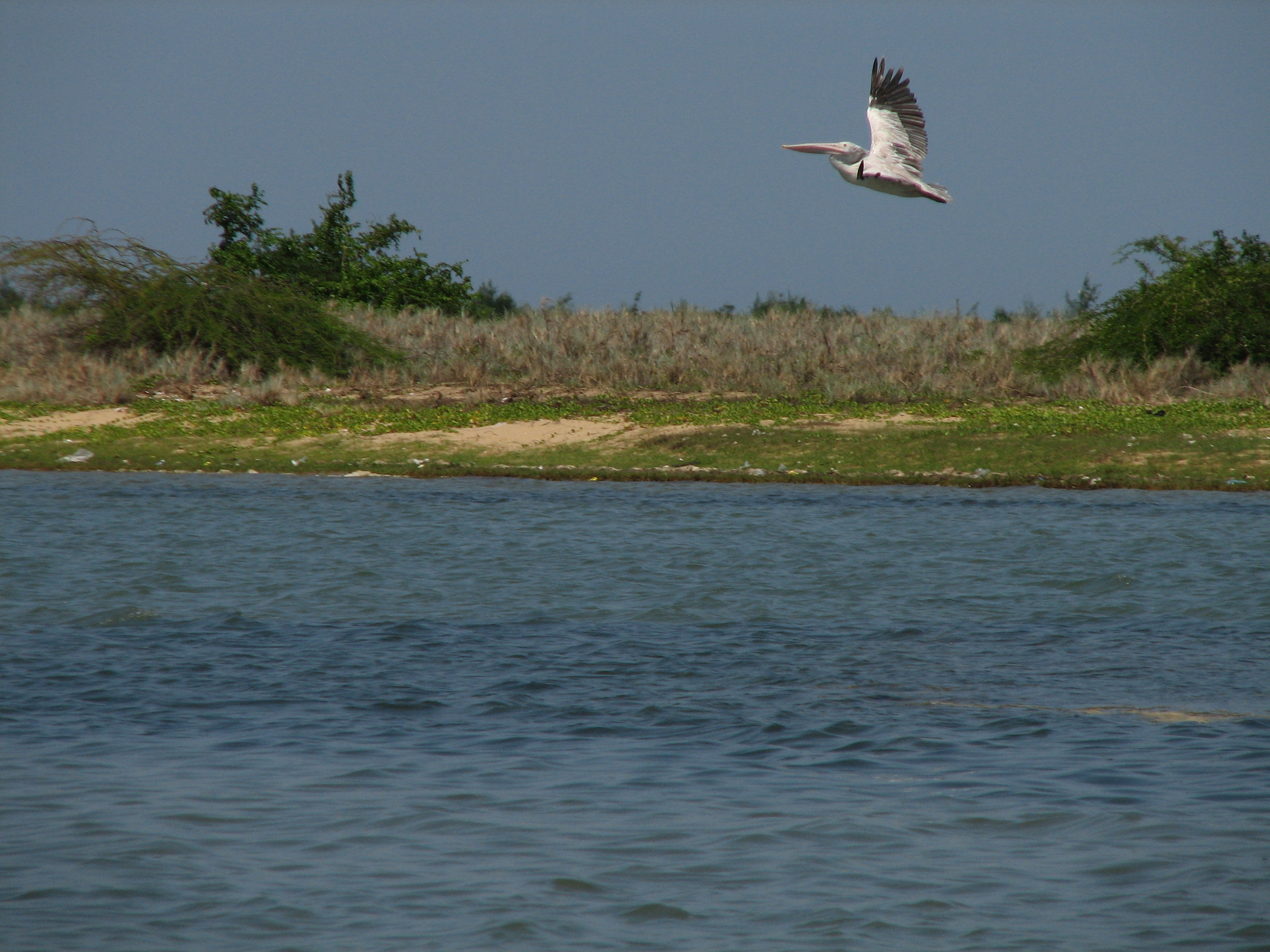
Spot-billed pelican at Pulicat Lake

The shallow lagoon is known for its diversity of aquatic birds and is an important stopover on migration routes and is reported to be the third-most-important wetland on the eastern coast of India for migratory shorebirds, particularly during the spring and autumn migration seasons. In view of the rich avifauna of the lagoon, two bird sanctuaries are established in the lagoon, one each in the Andhra Pradesh and Tamil Nadu states. The Andhra Pradesh portion of Pulicat Lake Bird Sanctuary, established in September 1976, has an area of 172 square kilometres (66 mi^{2}) within the lagoon's total area in the state in the Tada Taluk of Nellore district. The Wildlife Division of the state has listed 115 species of water and land birds in the sanctuary. Nelapattu Bird Sanctuary is also located nearby in its catchment area. The Tamil Nadu part of the lagoon of 60 square kilometres (23 mi^{2}), extending over the Ponneri and Gummidipundi taluks of Thiruvallur district, was declared a bird sanctuary in October 1980.

Every year approximately 15,000 greater flamingos are reported to visit the lagoon along with pelicans, kingfishers, herons, painted storks, spoonbills and ducks. The highest concentrations of flamingo are found in the periphery of the lagoon where the water level is below 40 centimetres (16 in). The concentrations of flamingos are also associated with high algal, fish, and benthic diversity. Other water birds in the area include spot-billed pelican, seven species of herons and egrets, painted stork, greater flamingos, ducks, 20 species of shorebirds, gulls, terns, little grebe, Indian cormorant, little cormorant, Asian openbill stork, black-headed ibis, Eurasian spoonbill, lesser whistling teal, Indian spot-billed duck, great thick-knee, and stone curlew. Several species of wintering waterfowl have been noted including bar-headed goose, ruddy shelduck, Eurasian wigeon, common teal, northern pintail, garganey, northern shoveller, common pochard, brown-headed gull, black-headed gull, whiskered tern, gull-billed tern, and Caspian tern. Birds of prey which appear in winter are the white-bellied sea eagle, harriers, and peregrine falcons. The largest concentrations of flamingos occur in the Andhra Pradesh part of the sanctuary, around the islands of Vendadu and Irukkam.

=== Aquatic vegetation ===
There are 59 species of aquatic vegetation, eight of Cyanophyceae, seven Chlorophyceae, and two Rhodophyceae. Patches of residual, dry, evergreen forest and large areas of littoral scrub in woodlands in fishing villages bordering the lagoon are seen. Invasive phytoplankton species of Prosopis juliflora, Spirulina major, Oscillatoria spp., Anabaena spp., Rhizosolenia castracanei, Eucampia cornuta and Climacodium frauenfeldianum in the plains on the periphery of the lake have been recorded.

== Threats and issues ==
Due to climate change and delay in the northeast monsoons quite often, lack of dredging activities in the estuaries region like Duggarajapatanam, Mulapadava and Tupilipalem. The diversity of the lake looks like the semi-salt-desert of what was the Aral Sea. It directly impacts wildlife conservation in those areas and livelihoods of the people of the coastal community. Evidence of these changes were inevitable; bird migrations have decreased rapidly due to lack of maintenance of the lakebeds. It affects almost 160 km^{2} of the lake. Almost 40% of the lake was dried up by 2020. Recent trends and data show that Pullicat Lake is in the verge of destruction due to the lack of dredging activities. If these trends continue, it would be like another Aral Sea.

In the Andhra Pradesh part of the lagoon, several threats to the lagoon have been identified. These are pollution from sewage, pesticides, agricultural chemicals, and industrial effluents from Arani and Kalangi rivers draining into the lagoon bringing fertilizers and pesticides with the runoff from the agricultural field into the drainage basin; domestic sewage; effluents and wastes from numerous fish-processing units; and oil spills from the mechanized boats. 4,780 hectares (11,800 acres) the lagoon have been affected by the release of marine chemicals; the salt-manufacturing industry and shrimp farming in more than 1,000 acres (400 ha) on the eastern part of the lagoon have affected the Pulicat Bird Sanctuary. The livelihoods of 30,000 fishermen and 20,000 agricultural labourers (for whom fishing is an off-season economic activity) have also been disturbed. This activity is also reported to have serious impact on aquaculture development.

Siltation and periodic closure of the bar mouth due to the dynamic process of sediment transport has caused reduction of size and seasonal closure of the mouth of the lagoon. It has reduced fresh seawater exchange and made the lagoon shallow and turbid. It is reported that average depth, 1.5 metres (4.9 ft) in the early 20th century, has been reduced to less than 1 metre (3.3 ft) in the lagoon. This has caused difficulties such as the bar mouth getting silted up and being closed during the summer season (June–July to Oct–Nov), and an increase in flood levels during the rainy season. The lagoon acts as a large evaporating basin when the bar is closed, resulting in salinity levels remaining low or high subject to the flood discharge into the lagoon during the northeast monsoon. The fluctuation of water levels in the lagoon (above or below the sea level) affects flora, fauna, and fisheries; siltation has caused variation of the lagoon mouth, resulting in reduction of tidal inflows and consequent decline in stocking of commercially important species of prawns and mullets. The floodplain reclamation in the Arani River basin for industrial and residential purposes is also increasing the lagoon's maximum water level during the floods.

Runoff from agricultural fields in the drainage basins of the Arani and Kalangi rivers into the lagoon has increased pollution load from fertilizers and pesticides; pollution from domestic sewage is also being released to the lagoon. A petrochemical complex, power plant, and satellite port on Ennore creek have further aggravated the problem; there is threat of flooding of 14 island villages of the lagoon. After the tsunami in 2004, the number of fishing boats have increased resulting in the "Catch Per Unit Effort" of fish, prawns and crabs declining from 1000 tonnes to about 700 tonnes; this has increased the social and fishing-rights conflicts between marine-based fishermen and the lagoon fishermen.

Due to the 2004 Indian Ocean earthquake, lagoon fishery was adversely affected, with many fishing communities losing all means of livelihood until the middle of April 2005, as the loss of lives, homes, and boats prevented them from going fishing in the sea and the lagoon. They subsisted on relief supplies provided by the government and other agencies. Many people in fish related trades were also affected. However, a beneficial effect of the tsunami was the widening of the opening to the lagoon.

== Restoration and social activities ==
Various groups and non-governmental organizations are active in the area. The AARDE Foundation maintains the Pulicat Museum at Pazhaverkadu to create awareness among inhabitants and city dwellers. The AARDE Foundation represented Pulicat at the United Nations' World Urban Forum and Habitat III as an associate-partner. Pulicat Day, part of Ramsar's World Wetlands Day, is celebrated every February by AARDE to bring attention to this fragile environment. An expert plan on "Wildlife Action Plan for Conservation Measures on the Pulicat lagoon Sanctuary" has envisaged setting up a hydrobiological research station and visitor center, providing shallow-bottomed boats to enable sanctuary staff to patrol the lagoon, and preparing a management plan and conservation strategy for the entire area. COPDANET is striving to implement a traditional "Paadu system" and regular desilting to ensure adequate salt and fresh water mix in the lagoon, which could enhance fish resources. The Centre for Research on New International Economic Order (CReNIEO) has been promoting the welfare of fishermen and management of the natural resources of the lagoon. A research study by Loyola College, Chennai reported in 2007 that the lagoon has made an ecological turnaround, recording toxicity levels well within permissible limits. Under the Tsunami Emergency Assistance Project (TEAP), construction of a high-level bridge across Pulicat Lagoon along with approach roads on both sides of the lagoon has been constructed, providing a safe escape route for people residing on the islands and also access for emergency response operations.

The southern part of the lagoon in Tamil Nadu 5 kilometres (3.1 mi) from the estuary is rich in fishes, and the fishing is controlled by a traditional Paadu system. Paadu is a traditional system of getting entitlements to eligible members of a particular community for undertaking specified fishing activity in certain designated areas. The fishing grounds fall within a radius of 5 kilometres (3.1 mi) from the mouth of the lagoon with a salinity well-maintained without much drying even during low tides. However, this traditional practice is based on caste control of the access rights to the high-productivity areas and is opposed by eastern fishermen and ocean-side villages. As a result, conflicts leading to violence have been reported.

== Transportation ==
The Tamil Nadu part of the lagoon is 60 kilometres (37 mi) north of Chennai, and the nearest airport and major railway station are in Chennai. The nearest suburban railway station is at Ponneri. Sullurpeta station is 17 kilometres (11 mi) from Sriharikota. The Buckingham Canal on the western side of the lagoon is the navigation route through the lagoon used by cargo and passenger vessels.

== Gallery ==
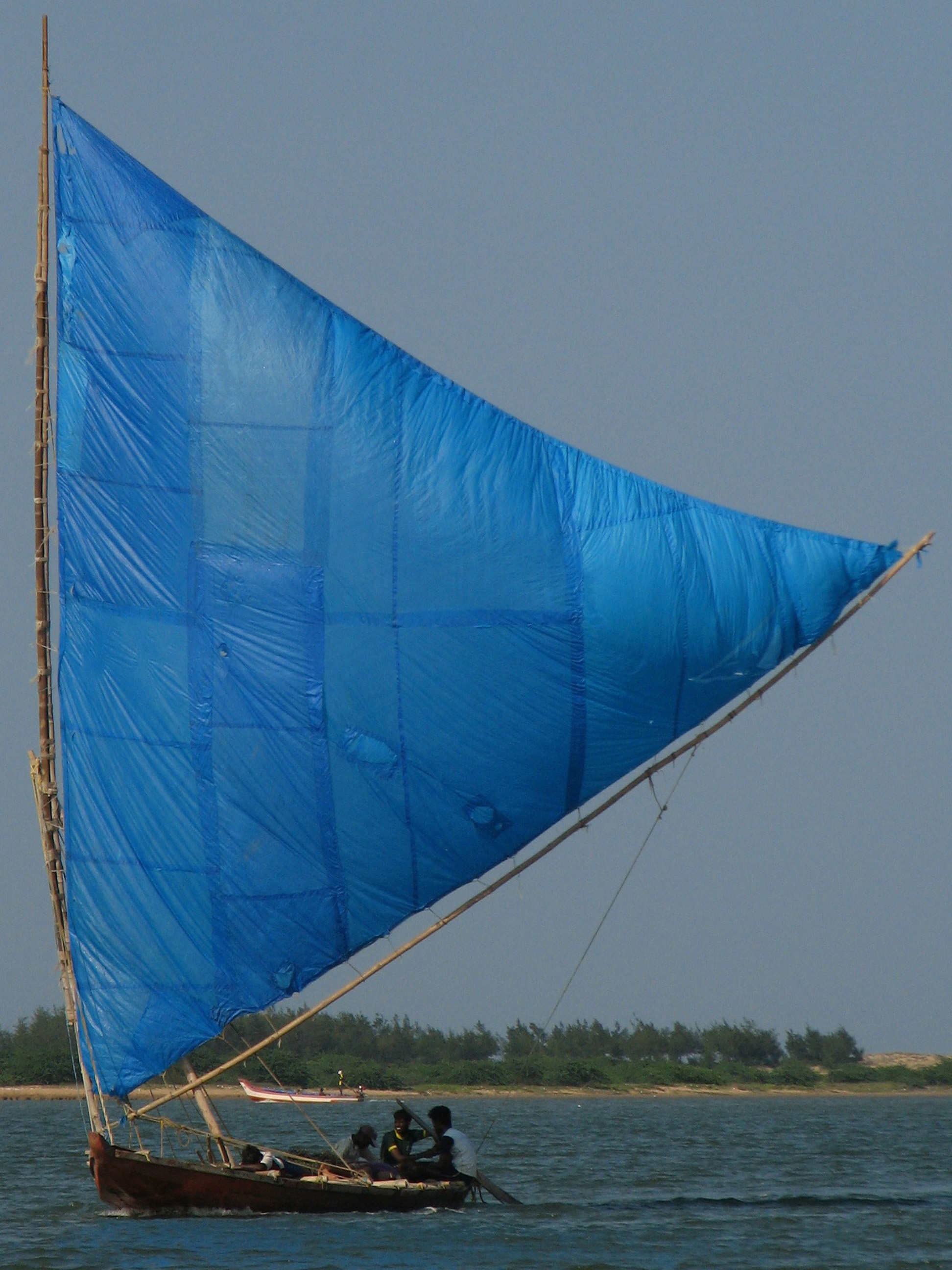
Traditional fishing boat

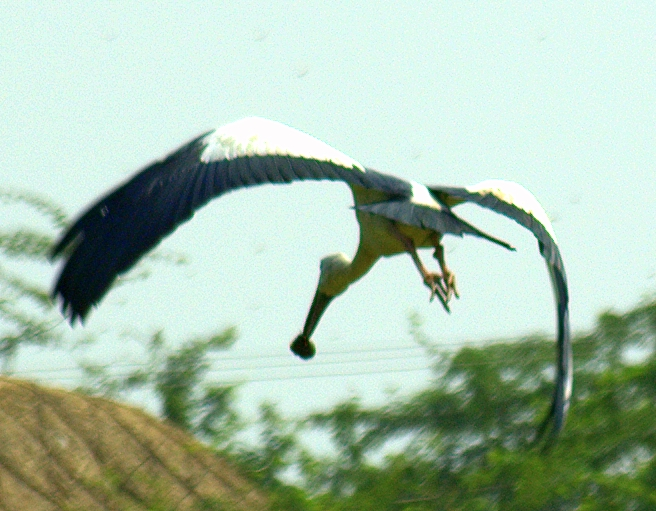
Asian openbill stork

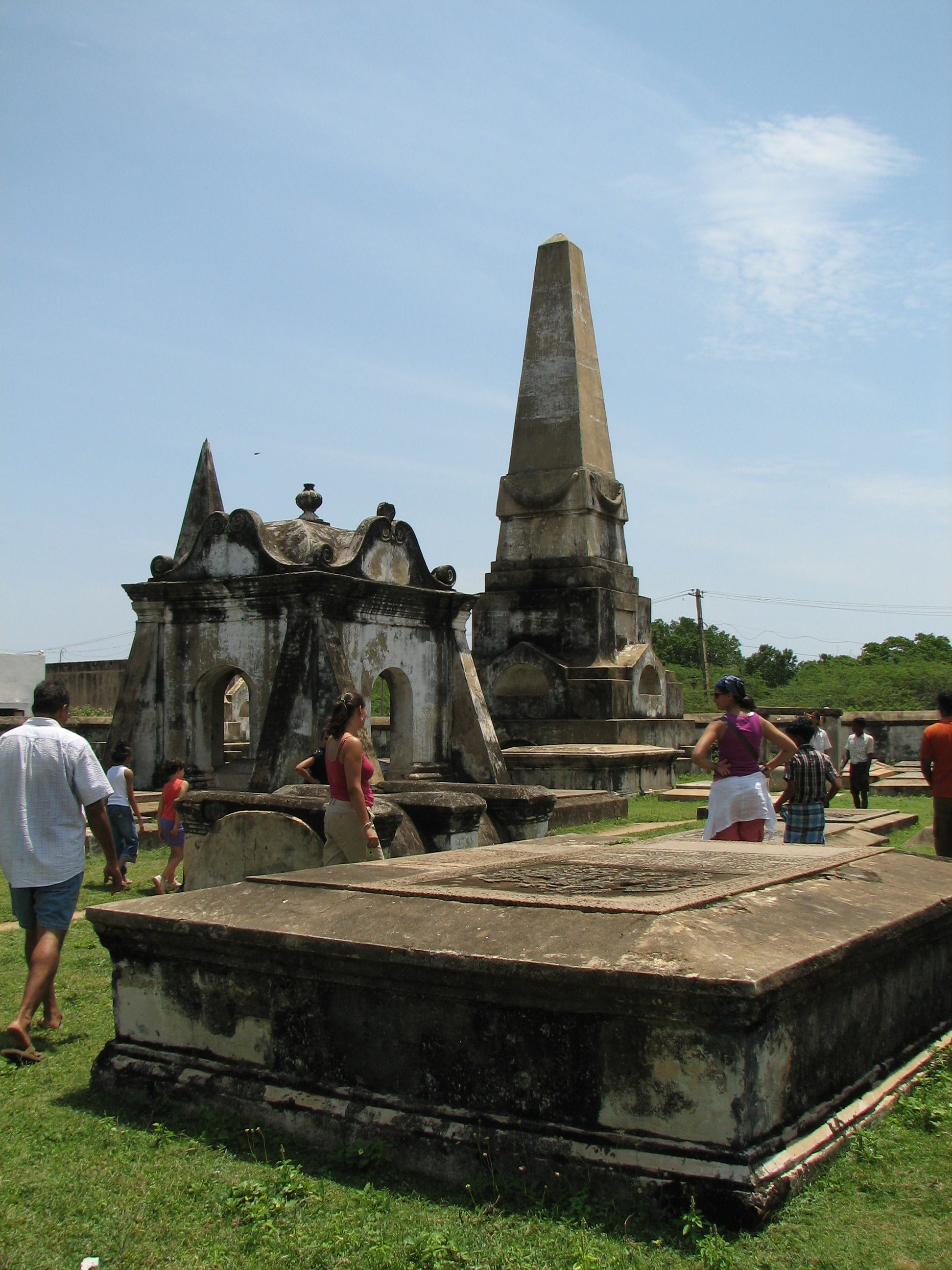
Old Dutch Cemetery

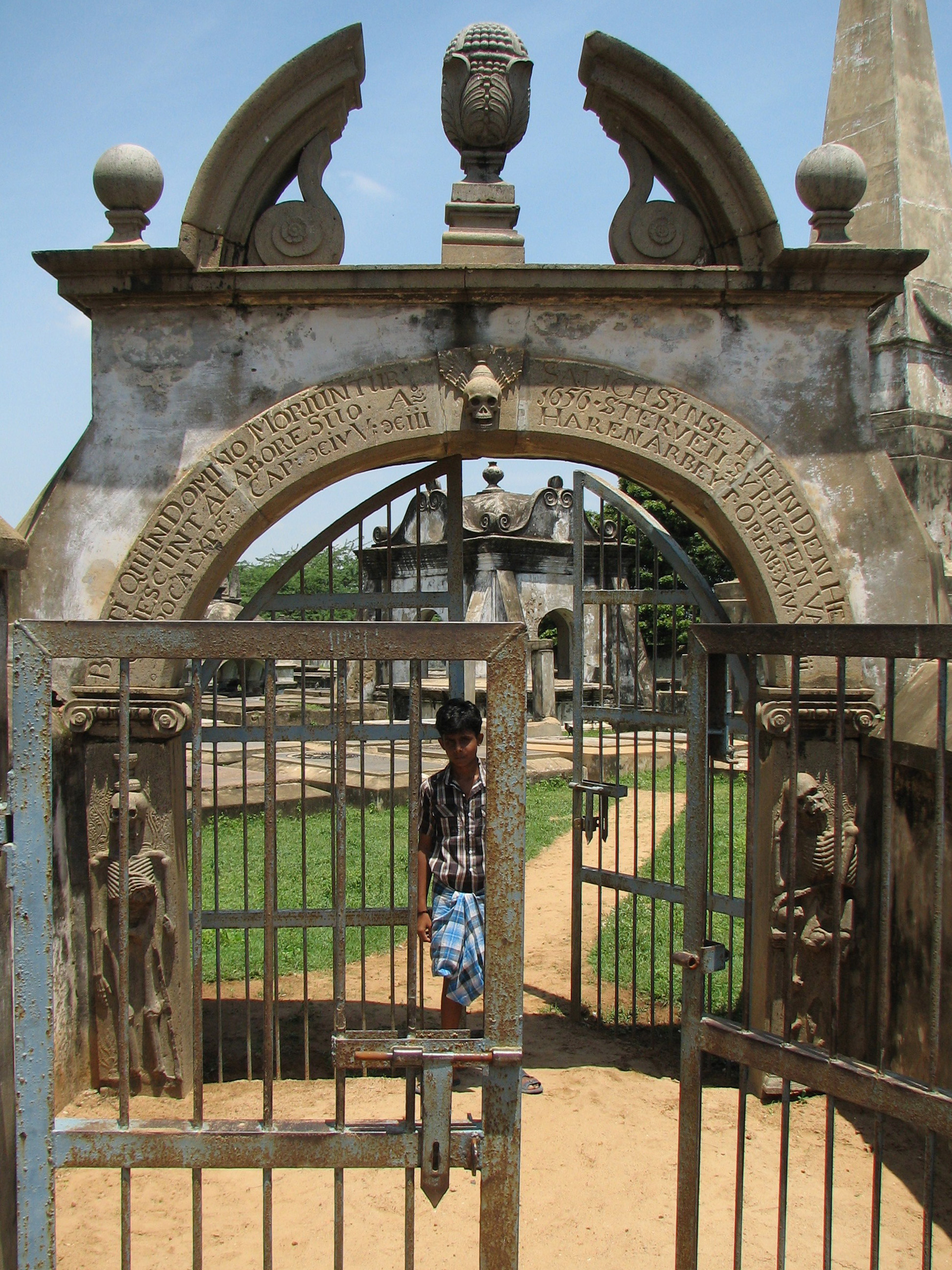
Entrance to the old Dutch Cemetery

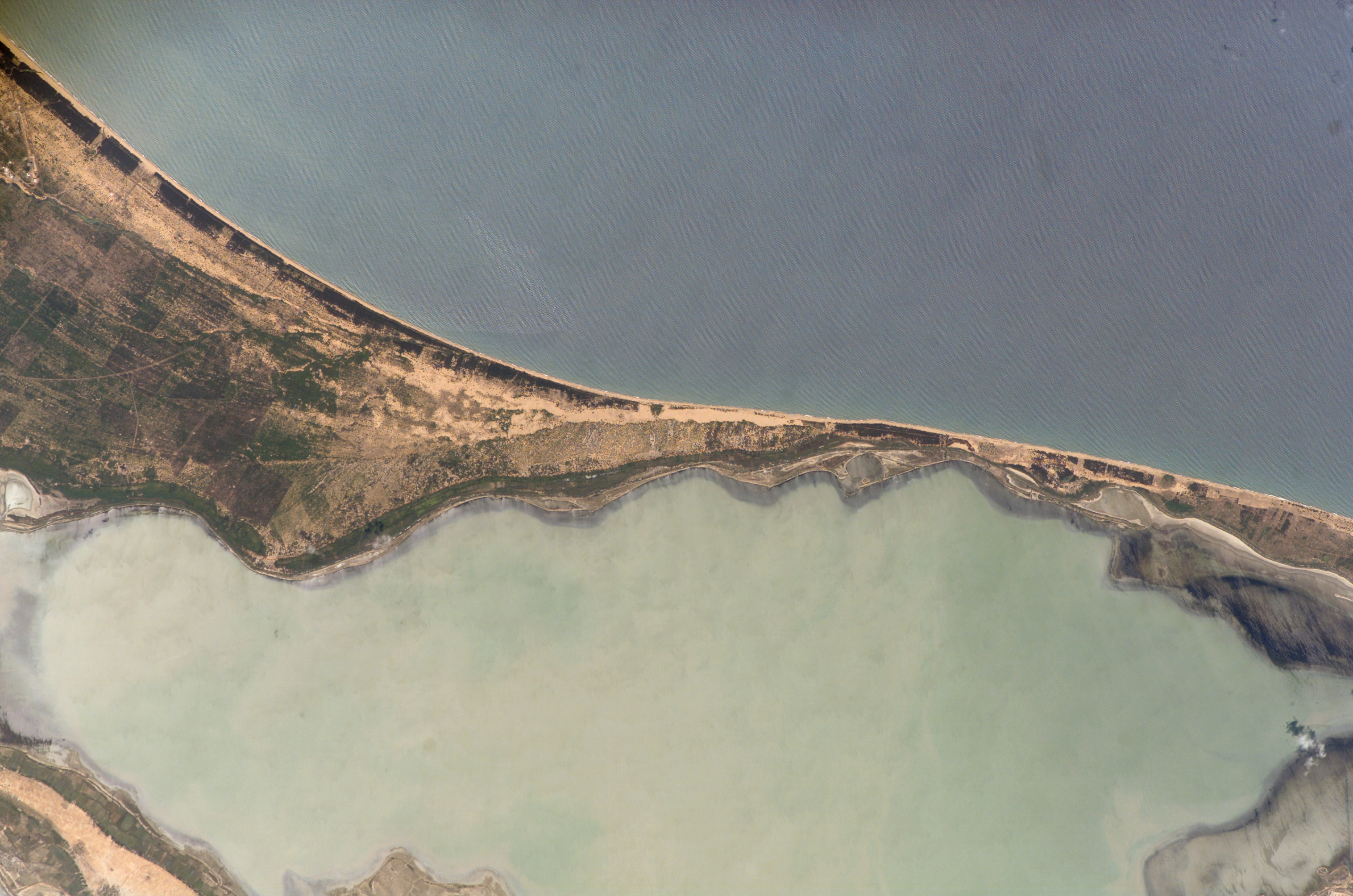
Pulicat Lake from ISS

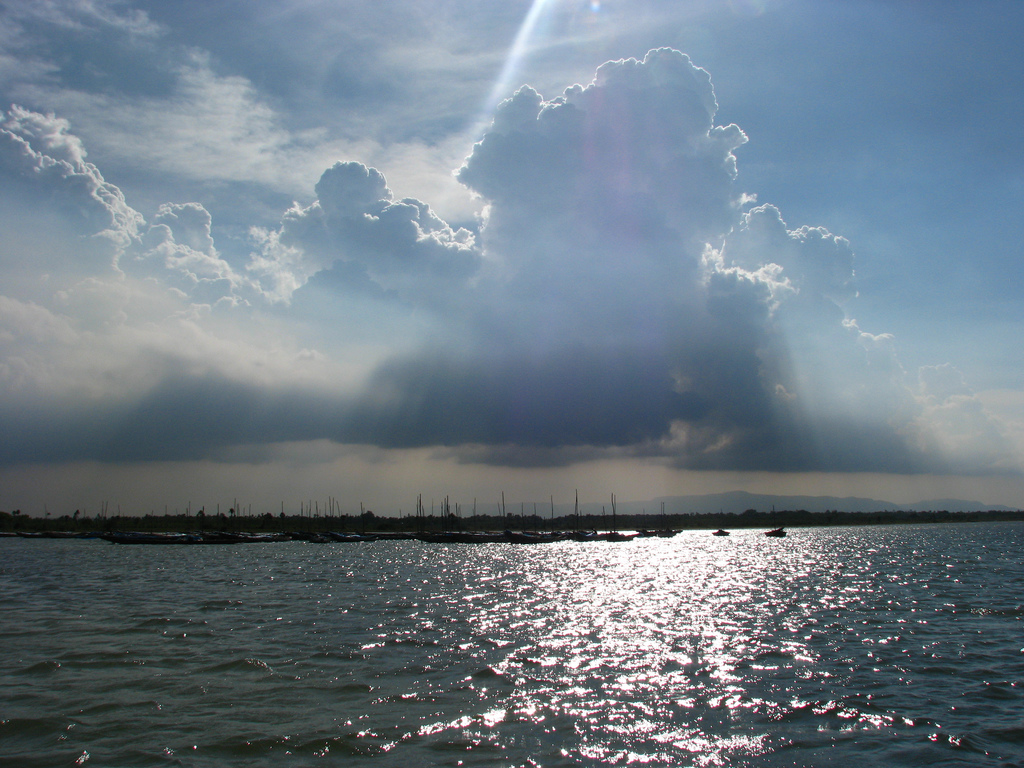
Pulicat Lake

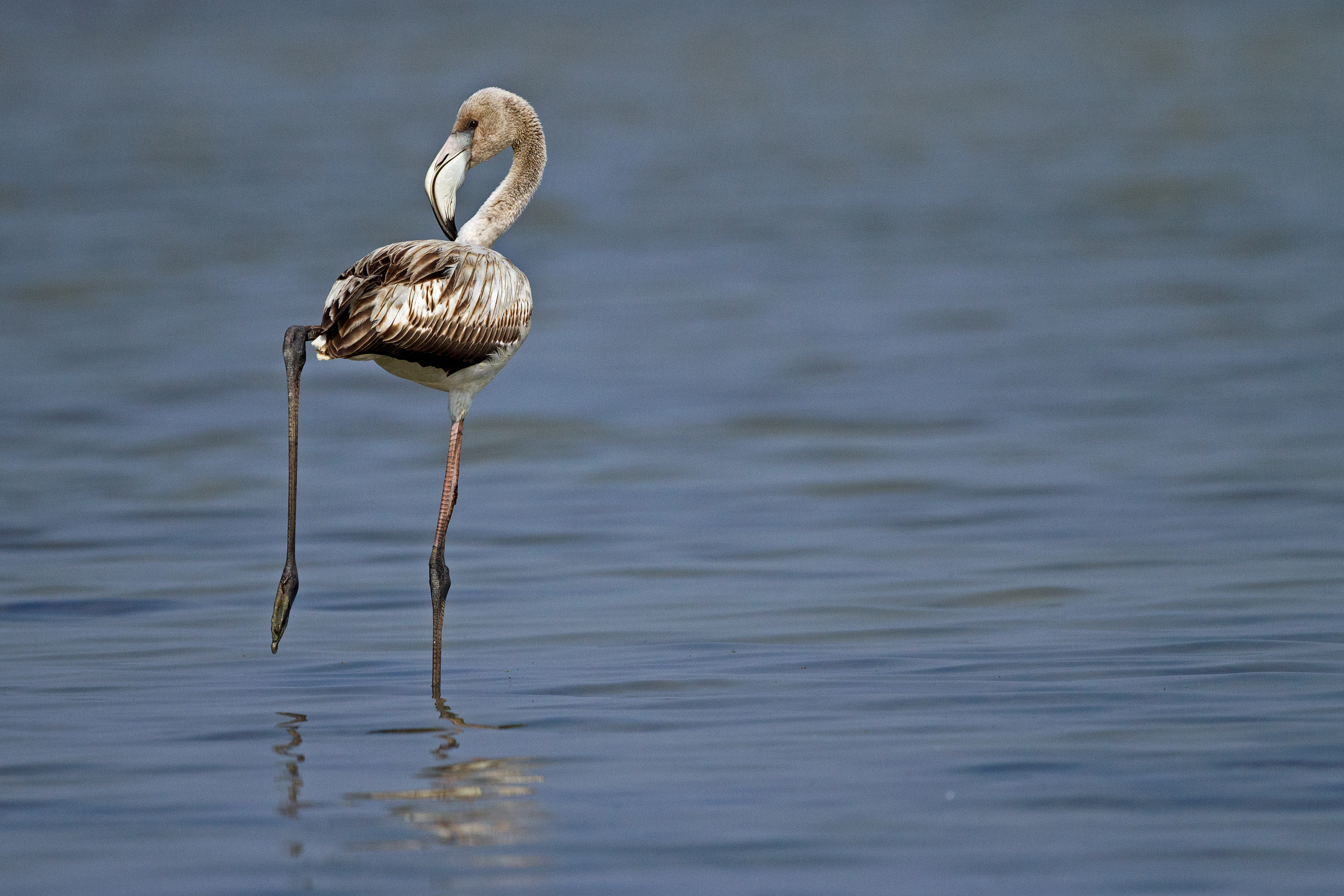
Greater flamingo (sub adult)

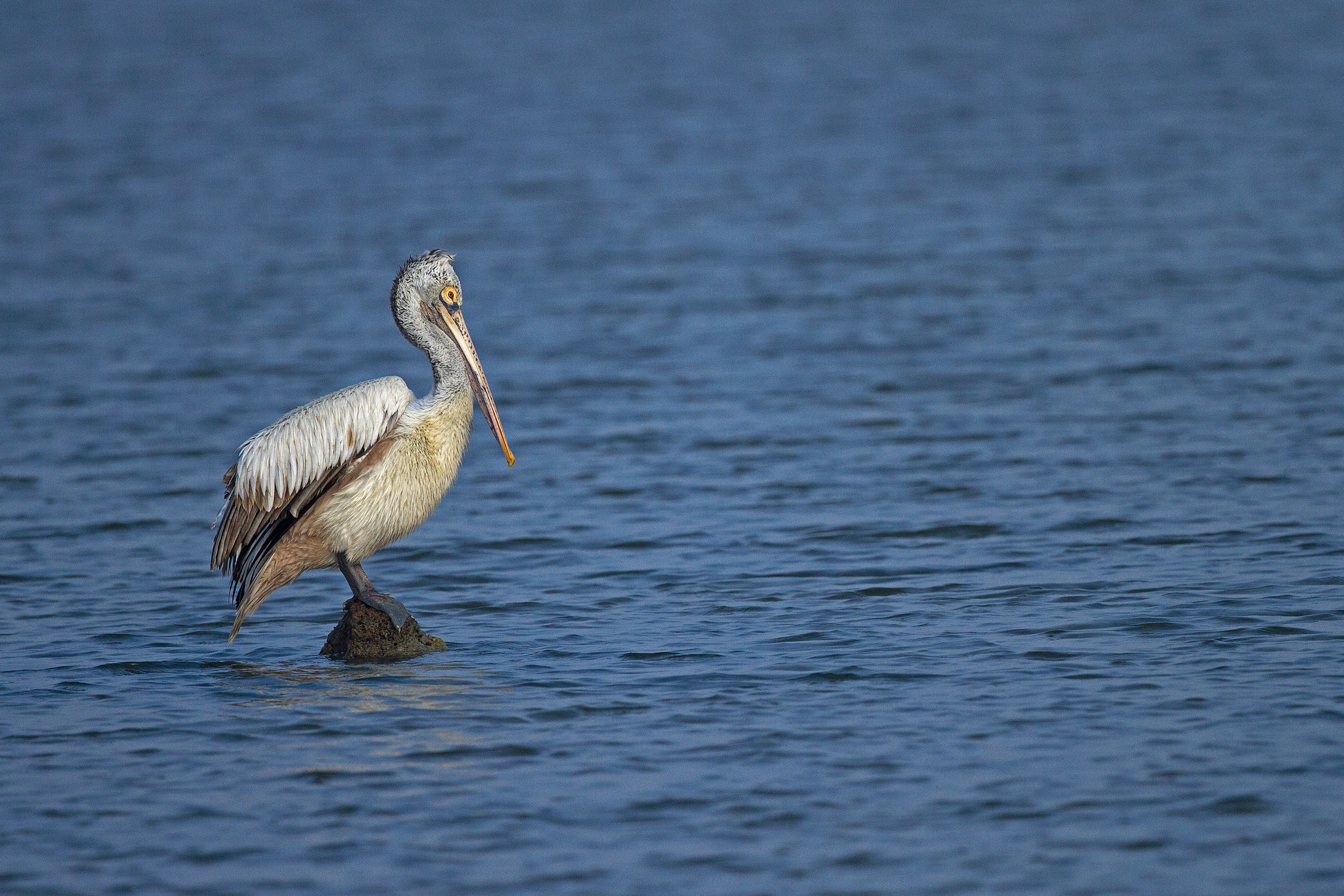
Spot-billed pelican (Pelecanus philippensis) at Pulicat Lake

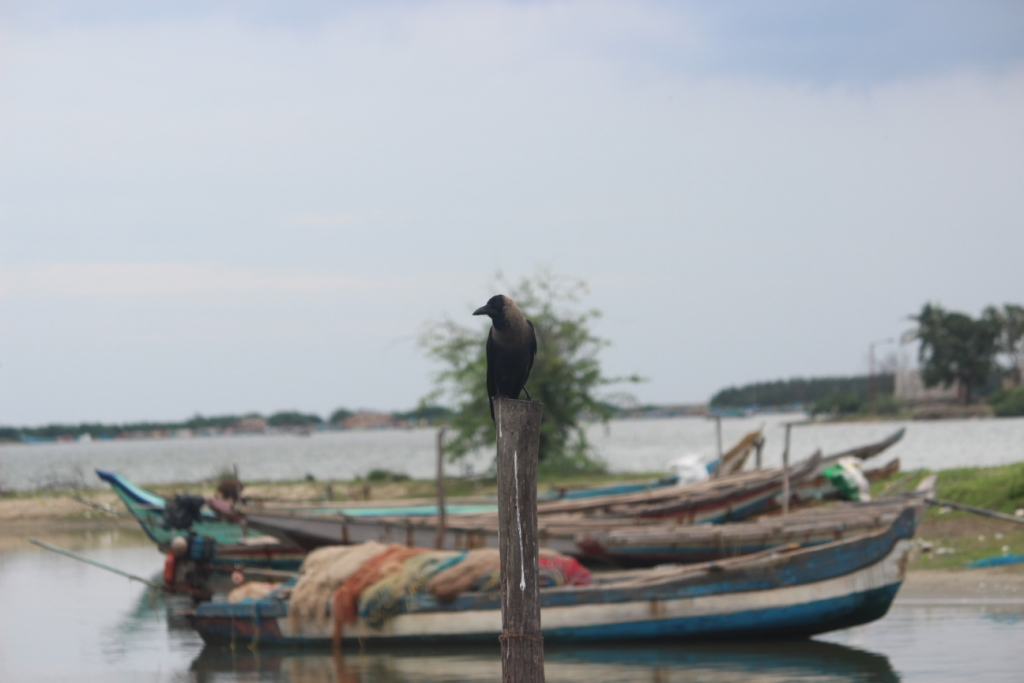
House crow

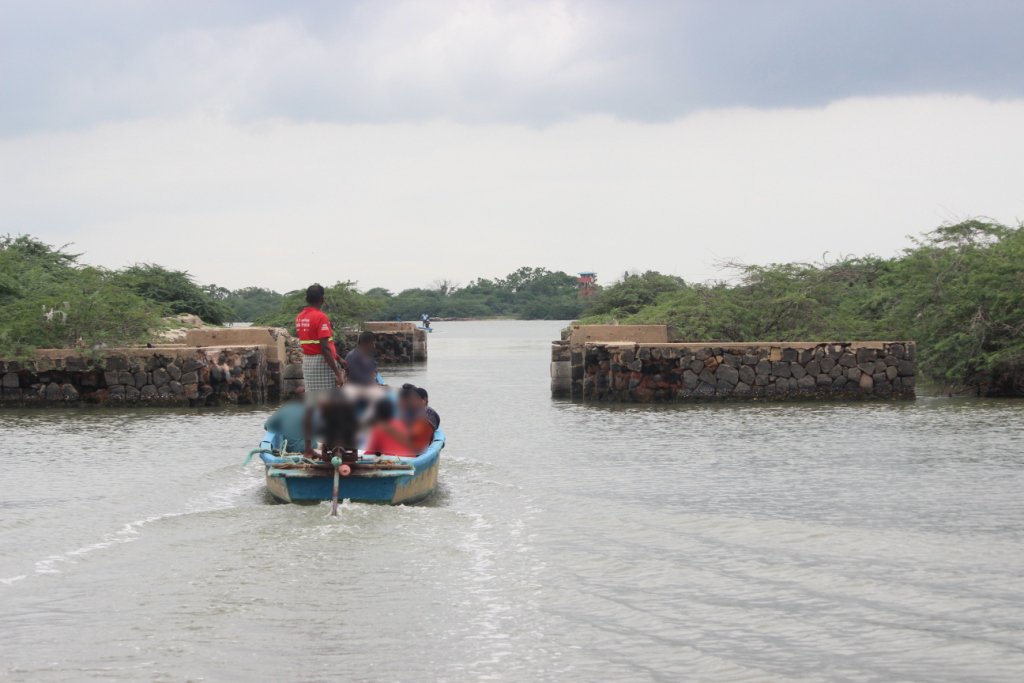
Tourist in Pulicat Lake

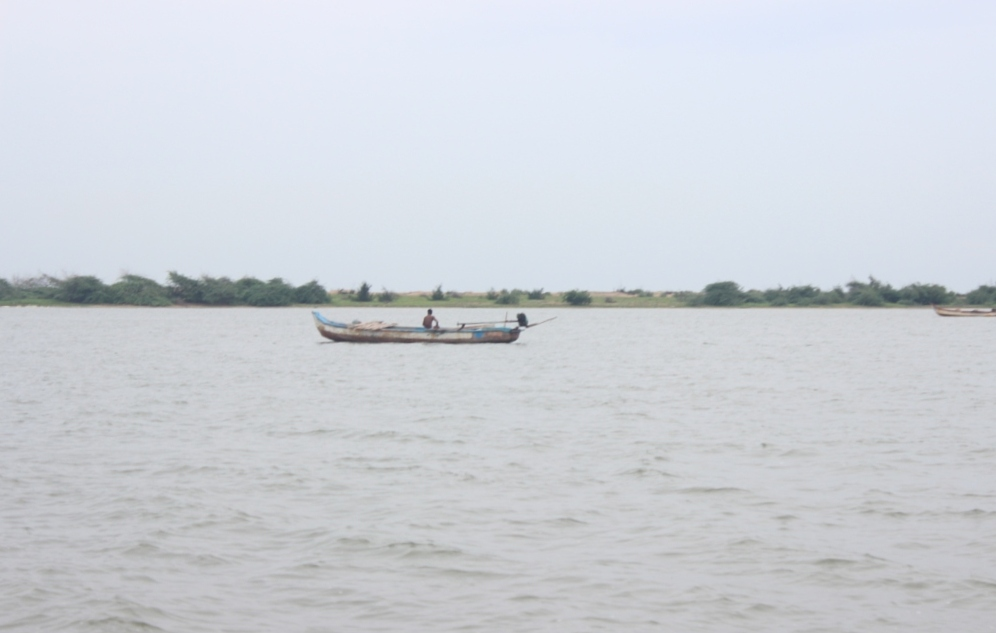
Fishermen in Pulicat Lake

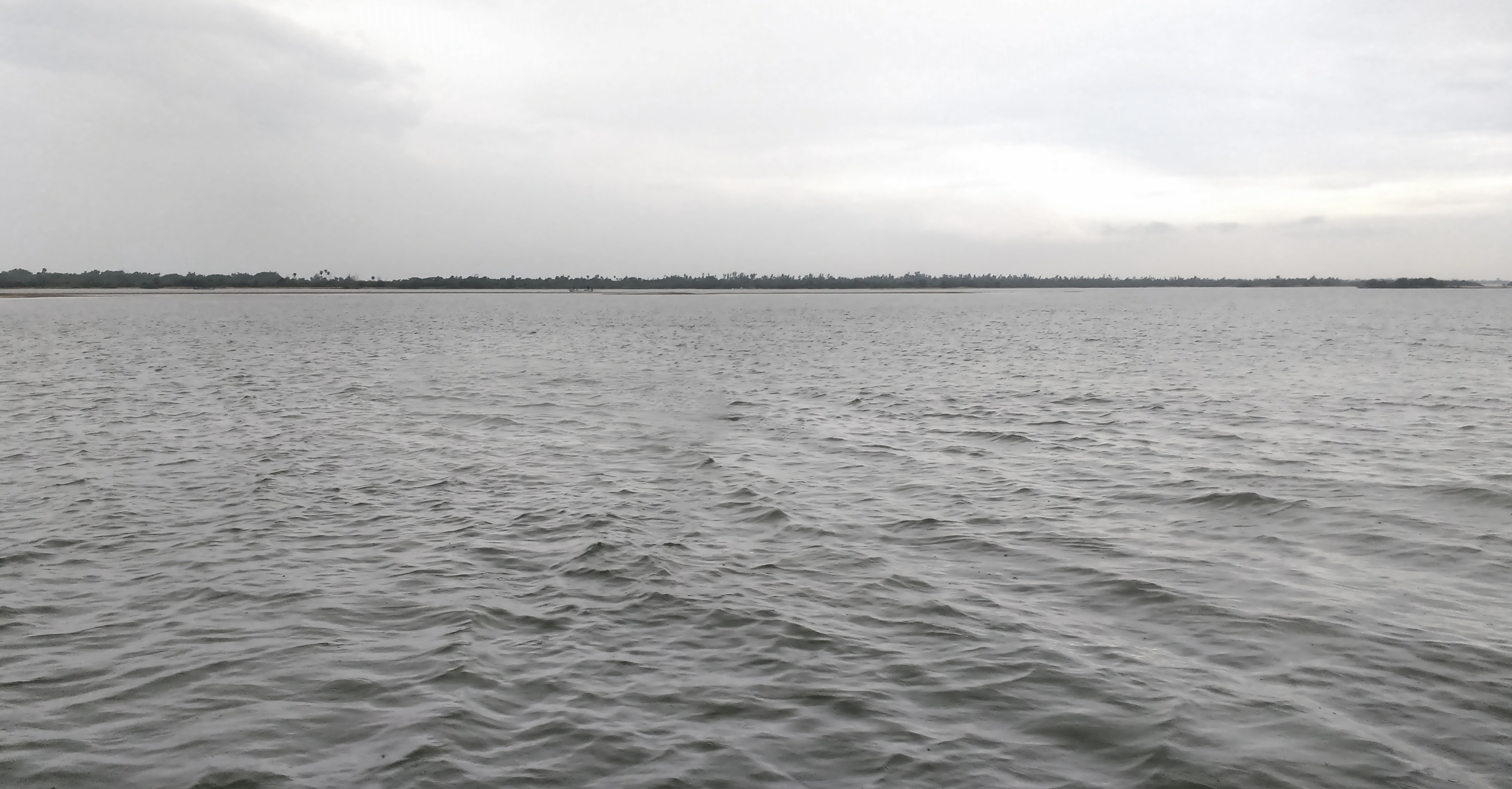
Ocean-like backwater in Pulicat

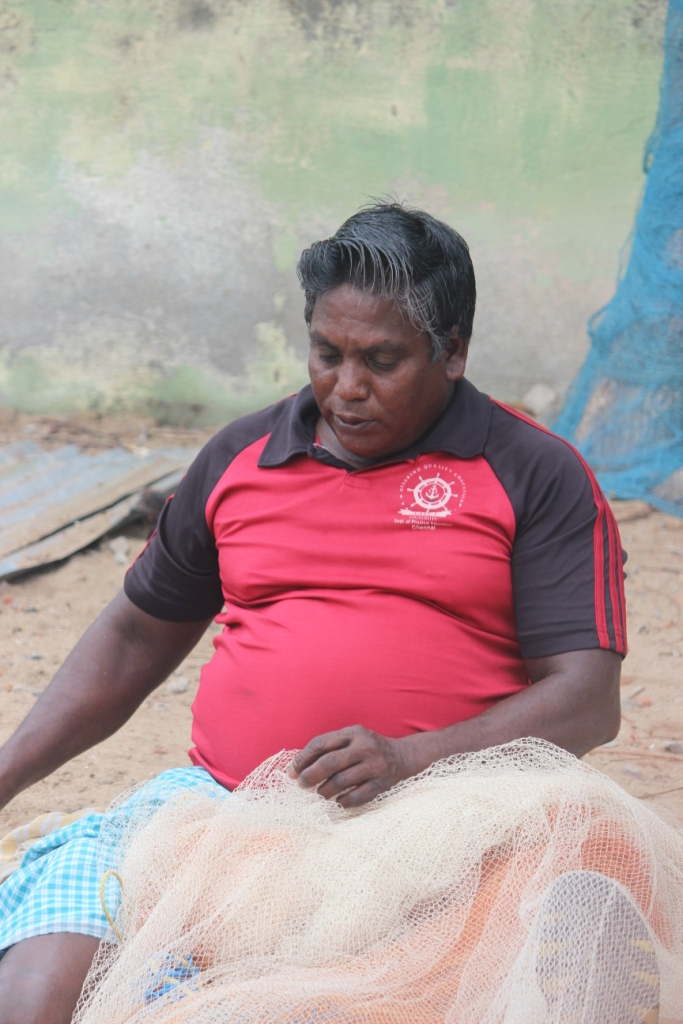
Fisherman cleaning his net in Pulicat Lake

== See also ==
- Nadari river
