= List of villages in Nellore district =

Nellore district in Andhra Pradesh

This is an alphabetical list of villages in United Nellore district, a district in Andhra Pradesh, India. During the COVID 19 pandemic, thousands of people thronged to a village in the district, Krishnapatnam, to get herbal cure for the deadly disease.

== A ==
- Ananthasagaram
- Anumasamudrampeta
- Apparao Palem

== B ==
- Balayapalle
- Basinenipalli
- Bheemavarappadu
- Bitragunta
- Bogole
- Botikarlapadu
- Buchireddypalem

== C ==
- Chaganam Rajupalem
- Cheerla Vari Kandrika
- Chejerla
- Chennavarappadu
- Chennur
- Chillakur
- Chintalapalem
- Chittamur

== D ==
- D. Velampalli
- Dagadarthi
- Daggavolu
- Dakkili
- Damaramadugu
- Damegunta
- Dharmavaram
- Doravarisatram
- Duggunta
- Duttalur

== G-J ==
- Gandipalem
- Indukurupeta
- Jaladanki
- Jonnawada

== K ==
- Kaligiri
- Kaluvoya
- Kammapalli
- Kammavaari palem
- Kammavari palli
- Kodavalur
- Kodivaka
- Kokkupalem
- Komatigunta Rajupalem
- Konagaluru
- Kondapuram
- Koneti Raju Palem
- Kota
- Kothapalli

== M ==
- Madamanuru
- Mangalampadu
- Manubolu
- Marlagunta
- Marripadu
- Menakuru
- Mittatmakur
- Mudivarthi
- Muthukur
- Mypadu

== N-O ==
- N. Kothapalli
- Narrawada
- Nelapattu
- Nellatur
- North Rajupalem
- Ojili

== P ==
- Pangili
- Pellakur
- Penchalakona
- Pennepalli
- Pepala vari palem
- Periyavaram
- Podalakur
- Puttamraju Kandriga

== R ==
- Rama Reddy Palem
- Ramanapalem
- Ramapuram
- Rebala

== S ==
- Saipeta
- Sangam
- Sarvepalli
- Seetharamapuram
- Shar Project
- Siddana konduru
- Siddareddy Palem
- Sydapuram

== T ==
- Tada
- Thinnelapudi
- Thippavarappadu
- Thirumalamma Palem
- Thoorpu Dubagunta
- Thotapalligudur
- Thummalapenta

== U ==
- Ulavapalli
- Utukur

== V ==
- Vakadu
- Varikuntapadu
- Veguru
- Venadu
- Vendodu
- Vidavalur
- Vinjamur
- Viruvur

== Y ==
- Yellayapalem
- Yerradoddipalli
