= Atmakur revenue division, Nellore district =

Revenue division in Nellore district, Andhra Pradesh, India

Atmakur revenue division
- Revenue division in SPSR Nellore district
- Country: India
- State: Andhra Pradesh
- District: Nellore
- Formed: 25 June 2013
- Founder: Government of Andhra Pradesh
- Time zone: UTC+05:30 (IST)

Atmakur revenue division is an administrative division in the Nellore district of the Indian state of Andhra Pradesh. It is one of the four revenue divisions in the district with nine mandals under its administration. The divisional headquarters are located at Atmakur.

== History ==
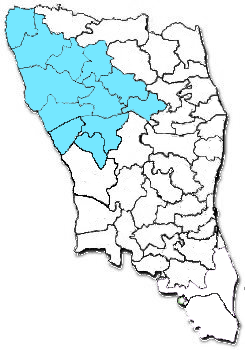
Atmakur revenue division during 2013–2022

The revenue division was formed with 10 mandals on 25 June 2013 by the Government of Andhra Pradesh. It was further reorganized with 9 mandals along with newly formed districts on 4 April 2022.

== Administration ==
There are 10 mandals administered under the revenue division during 2013–2022: Atmakur, Ananthasagaram, Anumasamudrampeta, Chejerla, Kaluvoya, Marripadu, Sangam, Seetharamapuram, Udayagiri, Vinjamur. The mandals were carved out of Kavali revenue division and Nellore revenue division.

There are 9 mandals administered under this revenue division since 2022. The Vinjamur mandal was moved to Kavali revenue division, which it was earlier part of it until 2013.

Mandals
Atmakur mandal
Ananthasagaram mandal
Anumasamudrampeta mandal
Chejerla mandal
Kaluvoya mandal
Marripadu mandal
Sangam mandal
Seetharamapuram mandal
Udayagiri mandal

== See also ==
- List of revenue divisions in Andhra Pradesh
- List of mandals in Andhra Pradesh
