= Nellore mandal =

- Former mandal of Andhra Pradesh
- 2022
- Capital: Nellore
- Population
  - 2011 Census: 631,791
Succeeded by
Nellore urban mandal; Nellore rural mandal

Nellore mandal is a former mandal in the Nellore district of the state of Andhra Pradesh, India. Its headquarters was located at Nellore. The mandal is bounded by Sangam, Butchireddipalem, Indukurpet, Kovur, Podlakur, Thotapalligudur, Venkatachalam and Muthukur mandals. It was divided from the Nellore urban mandal and Nellore rural mandal on 4 April 2022.

== Demographics ==
As of 2011 census, the mandal had a population of 631,791. The total population constitutes 321,087 males and 310,704 females—a sex ratio of 968 females per 1,000 males. 59,631 children are in the age group of 0–6 years, of which 30,781 are boys and 28,850 are girls—a ratio of 937 per 1,000. The average literacy rate stands at 80.96% with 463,205 literates.

== Towns and villages ==
Gudipallipadu is the most populated village, and Mattempadu is the least populated settlement in the mandal. As of 2011 census, the mandal has 34 settlements, that includes:

1. Akkacheruvupadu
2. Allipuram (rural)
3. Amancherla
4. Ambapuram
5. Buja Buja Nellore (rural)
6. Chintareddipalem
7. Devarapalem
8. Donthali
9. Golla Kandukur
10. Gudipallipadu
11. Gundlapalem
12. Kakupalle-I
13. Kakupalle-II (Madaraja Gudur)
14. Kallurpalle (rural)
15. Kandamur
16. Kanuparthipadu
17. Mannavarappadu
18. Mattempadu
19. Mogallapalem
20. Mulumudi
21. Ogurupadu
22. Pedda Cherukur
23. Penubarthi
24. Pottepalem
25. Sajjapuram
26. South Mopur
27. Upputuru
28. Vellanti
29. Visavaviletipadu

Sources:

- Census India 2011 (sub districts)
- Revenue Department of AP

== See also ==
- Nellore district
