= Vinjamur =

- Village
- Interactive map of Vinjamur
- Location in Andhra Pradesh, India
- Coordinates: 14°50′5.986″N 79°34′41.415″E
- Country: India
- State: Andhra Pradesh
- District: Nellore district

Area
  - Total: 16.15 km^{2} (6.24 sq mi)

Population (2011)
  - Total: 30,250
  - Density: 1,873/km^{2} (4,851/sq mi)

Languages
  - Official: Telugu
- Time zone: UTC+5:30 (IST)
- Postal code: 524228
- Vehicle registration: AP

Vinjamur is an upcoming town in Nellore district of the Indian state of Andhra Pradesh. It is the mandal headquarters of Vinjamur mandal. and the distance from Nellore is 80 km.

== Near mandals ==
- East kaligiri mandal
- West duttaluru mandal, atmakur mandal
- North kondapuram mandal
- South anusamudrapeta mandal

== Nearby villages ==
- Katepalle 5 km
- Nandigunta 5 km
- Utukuru 7 km
- Nagasamudram 8 km
- Gottigundala of Kondapuram Mandal - 11 km
- Sankavaram 11 km
- Padakandla 13 km

== Villages ==
There are 16 administrative villages in vinjamur Mandal.

- bukkapuram
- Chakalakonda
- Chandrapadia
- Chinthalapalem
- Gundemadakala
- Janardhanapuram
- Katepalli
- Kistipuram
- Nallagonda
- Nandigunta
- Ravipadu
- Sankavaram
- Thamidapadu
- Utukuru
- Juvviguntapalem
- Vannurupalem
- Vinjamur

== Irrigational facilities ==
Borewells are the main source of drinking and irrigated water. Yarraballipalem Pond and Pathur Pond are important ponds. Water supply to agriculture in vinjamur is through the following sources. Wells / Bore wells: 150 hectares

Ponds: 403 hectares

== Demographics ==
As of 2011 Census of India, the town had a population of 30,250. The total population constitute, 15,200 males, 15,050 females and 2,348 children, in the age group of 0–6 years. The average literacy rate stands at 80.31% with 13,294 literates, higher than the national average of 73.00%.
