= Gudur (disambiguation) =

Gudur is a town in SPSR Nellore district, Andhra Pradesh, India.

Gudur may also refer to the following places in India:

- Gudur mandal, SPSR Nellore district, containing the town
- Gudur revenue division, containing the mandal and town
- Gudur, Kurnool, a town in Andhra Pradesh
- Gudur (Mahabubabad district), a village in Telangana
- Gudur, Nalgonda district, a village in Telangana
