= Kakitalupuru =

Village in India

Coordinates: 14°12′57″N 79°53′57″E

Kagithalapuru or Kakitalupuru is a small village in Manubolu mandal of Nellore district of Andhra Pradesh, India.

== History ==
Abdullah Badshah Sultan was the ruler of Nellore district from 1623 to 1672 A.D
