= Nellore revenue division =

- revenue division in SPSR Nellore district
- Country: India
- State: Andhra Pradesh
- District: Nellore

Nellore revenue division (or Nellore division) is an administrative division in the Nellore district of the Indian state of Andhra Pradesh. It is one of the four revenue divisions in the district with twelve mandals under its administration. The divisional headquarters are located at Nellore city.

== Mandals ==
The mandals in the division are:

1. Buchireddypalem
2. Indukurpet
3. Kovur
4. Manubolu
5. Muthukur
6. Nellore rural
7. Nellore urban
8. Podalakur
9. Rapur
10. Sydapuram
11. Thotapalli Gudur
12. Venkatachalam

== See also ==
- List of revenue divisions in Andhra Pradesh
- List of mandals in Andhra Pradesh
