= Siddareddy Palem =

- Village
- Country: India
- State: Andhra Pradesh
- District: Nellore district

Population
  - Total: 900

Languages
  - Official: Telugu
- Time zone: UTC+5:30 (IST)
- Vehicle registration: AP 26

Siddareddy Palem is a village in Chennuru panchayat, Dagadarthi mandal of Andhra Pradesh in India. the village has a total population of 900. The official language is Telugu.
