= Kaligiri =

- Town
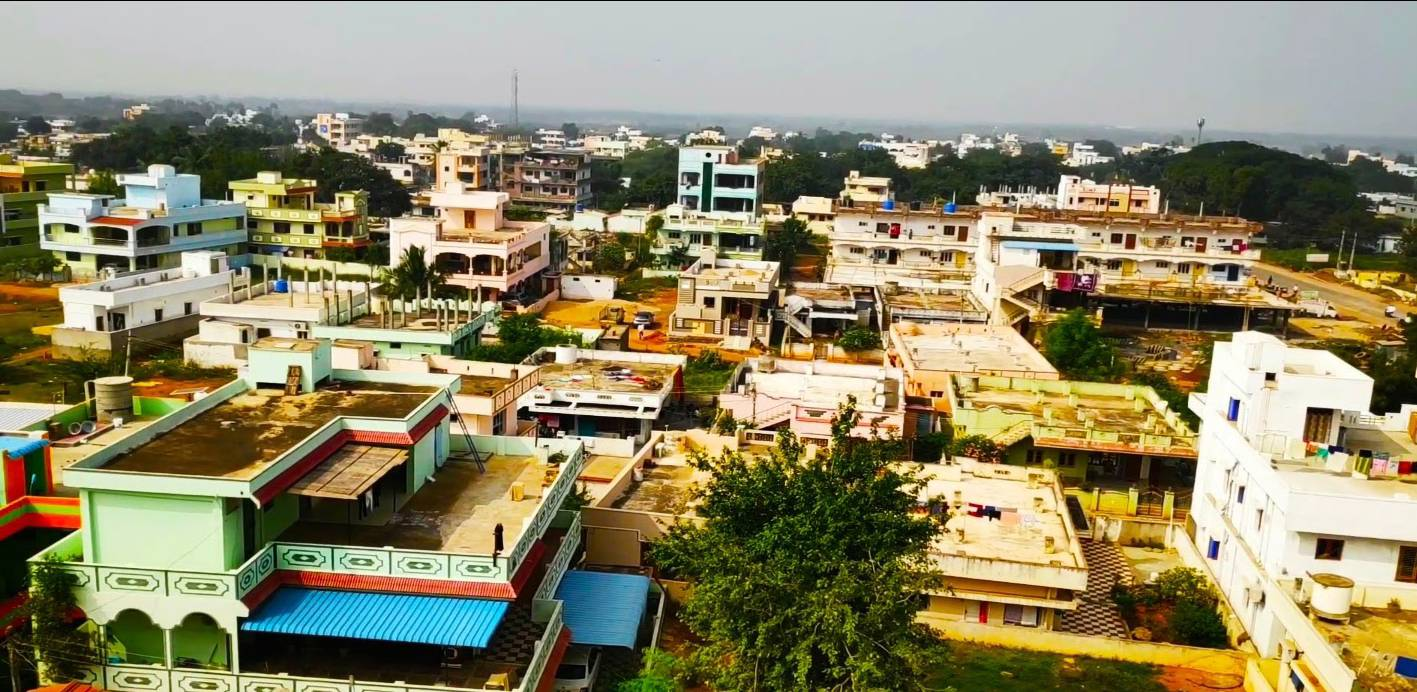
- Interactive map of Kaligiri
- Location in Andhra Pradesh, India
- Coordinates: 14.8333°N 79.7000°E
- Country: India
- State: Andhra Pradesh

Government
  - Type: Panchayati raj
  - Body: Kaligiri Gram panchayat

Area
  - Total: 3 km^{2} (1.2 sq mi)
  - Rank: 11
- Elevation: 70 m (230 ft)

Population (2011)
  - Total: 30,250
  - Density: 10,000/km^{2} (26,000/sq mi)

Languages
  - Official: Telugu, urdu
- Time zone: UTC+5:30 (IST)
- Postal Index Number: 524224
- Vehicle registration: AP 39

Kaligiri is a Town in Nellore district in the Indian state of Andhra Pradesh it is the mandal headquarters of Kaligiri Mandal in India.

== Transport ==
There is a bus station in Kaligiri near the Sangam Road, Kavali Road Kandukur Road, Udayagiri Road intersection. There is also a bus stand in R&B Banglow Bee Said, Kaligiri. From there, Other Depot buses go to Nellore, Kavali, Kanigiri, Pamur, Atmakuru(N), Kandukur, Udayagiri, Vijayawada, Kadapa, Others State Buses Hyderabad MGBS, Bangalore, Chennai, and other destinations. Railway line, Nadikudi-Srikalahasthi is passing (under construction) through the town.and well connected by road

== Near villages ==
- Velagapadu 7 km
- nagasamudram 6 km
- AyyapareddyPallem 11 km
- Tellapadu 11 km
- PathanaPuram 13 km

== Villages ==
There are 23 administrative villages are there in Kaligiri Mandal.

- Jirravaripalem
- Papanamusilipalem
- Venkanapalem
- Polampadu
- Kammavaripalem
- Sidhanakonduru
- Tellapadu
- Dobugunta
- Pathanapuram
- Gumprlapadu
- Nagasamudram
- Verareddypalem
- Krakuturu
- Krishareddypalem
- Chinnaanaluru
- Basireddypalem
- Gangireddypalem
- Narasareddypalem
- Peddapadu
- Peddakonduru
- Yepinapi
- Thurpu Gudladona
- Ananthapuram
- Kaligiri

== Near Mandals ==
- East jaladanki mandal
- West vinjamuru mandal
- North Kondapuram mandal
- South anusamudrapeta mandal

== Demographics ==
As of 2011 Census of India, the town had a population of 30,250. The total population constitute, 15,200 males, 15,050 females and 2,348 children, in the age group of 0–6 years. The average literacy rate stands at 80.31% with 13,294 literates, higher than the national average of 73.00%.
