= Thirumalamma Palem =

Thirumalamma Palem is a village located in the taluk of Venkatachalam, district of Sri Potti Sriramulu Nellore, in the State of Andhra Pradesh, India.
