= APBR =

APBR may refer to:

- Association for Professional Basketball Research, an organization that researches the history of basketball and analyzes basketball through objective evidence, especially advanced basketball statistics
- APBR School Gandipalem
- Andrew Phillip Brown (author abbreviation A.P.Br., born 1951), a botanist
