= Mittatmakur =

- Village
- Interactive map of Mittatmakur
- Location in Andhra Pradesh, India Mittatmakur (India)
- Coordinates: 14°14′54″N 79°48′09″E
- Country: India
- State: Andhra Pradesh
- District: SPSR Nellore

Languages
  - Official: Telugu
- Time zone: UTC+5:30 (IST)
- PIN: 524409

Mittatmakur is a village (with a gram panchayat) located at a distance of around 14 kilometers from Gudur, Nellore District, Andhra Pradesh. The village comes under Gudur constituency.
