= Chintalapalem =

- Village
- Nickname: C Palem
- Interactive map of Chintalapalem
- Location in Andhra Pradesh, India Chintalapalem (India)
- Coordinates: 14.4232387°N 79.3634517°E
- Country: India
- State: Andhra Pradesh
- District: Nellore

Population
  - Total: 800

Languages
  - Official: Telugu
- Time zone: UTC+5:30 (IST)
- Website: www.chintalapalem.com

Chintalapalem is a village in Jaladhanki mandal in Nellore district in the state of Andhra Pradesh in India. It has an area of about 22 hectares. The population is approximately 800 people in 500 households. There are two schools in the village: Zilla Parshid High School and Mandala Prashid School.
