= Duggunta =

- Village
- Interactive map of Duggunta
- Location in Andhra Pradesh, India Duggunta (India)
- Coordinates: 14°18′35″N 79°39′25″E
- Country: India
- State: Andhra Pradesh
- District: Nellore

Languages
  - Official: Telugu
- Time zone: UTC+5:30 (IST)

Duggunta is a small village or hamlet (Panchayath) in Podalakur Mandal in Spsr Nellore District of Andhra Pradesh State, India. It comes under Duggunta Panchayath.
