= Atmakur revenue division =

Atmakur revenue division may refer to:

- Atmakur revenue division, Nandyal district
- Atmakur revenue division, Nellore district
