= Chejerla =

Chejerla may refer to two places in Andhra Pradesh, India:

- Chejerla, Guntur district
- Chejerla, Nellore district
