= Komatigunta Rajupalem =

- Village
- Interactive map of Komatigunta Rajupalem
- Location in Andhra Pradesh, India Komatigunta Rajupalem (India)
- Coordinates: 14.2139°N 79.6250°E
- Country: India
- State: Andhra Pradesh
- District: Andhra Pradesh
- Mandal: Sydapuram

Languages
  - Official: Telugu
- Time zone: UTC+5:30 (IST)
- Vehicle registration: AP

Komatigunta Rajupalem is a village in Nellore district of the Indian state of Andhra Pradesh. It is located in Sydapuram mandal.
