= Konagaluru =

Coordinates: 14.334°N 79.674°E

Konagaluru is a village in the Mandal of Podalakur in Nellore district, Andhra Pradesh, India. Total population of Konagaluru is 1073 .Males are 522 and Females are 551 living in 244 Houses. Total area of Konagaluru is 1520 hectares.
