= Basinenipalli =

- Village
- Interactive map of Basinenipalli
- Location in Andhra Pradesh, India
- Coordinates: 14.9721°N 79.20835°E
- Country: India
- State: Andhra Pradesh
- District: Nellore
- Mandal: Seetharamapuram

Population
  - Total: 1,943

Languages
  - Official: Telugu
- Time zone: UTC+05:30 (IST)
- Pincode: 524226
- Vehicle registration: AP

Basinenipalli is a village in Seetharamapuram Mandal of Nellore district in the Indian state of Andhra Pradesh.
