= Nellatur =

- Out Growth/Village
- Interactive map of Nellatur
- Location in Andhra Pradesh, India Nellatur (India)
- Coordinates: 14°08′57″N 79°49′23″E
- Country: India
- State: Andhra Pradesh
- District: Nellore
- Mandal: Gudur
- Talukas: Gudur
- Elevation: 20 m (66 ft)

Languages
  - Official: Telugu
- Time zone: UTC+5:30 (IST)
- Vehicle registration: AP

Nellatur is a village in Gudur mandal in SPSR Nellore district of the Indian state of Andhra Pradesh. It is located in the Andhra region. It is currently merged with Gudur town.

The local language is Telugu.

== Religion ==
Nellatur hosts a Shiva temple, the Sri Rama Mandiram Temple, and the Gangamma Temple.
