= Viruvur =

Viruvooru
- village
- Interactive map of Viruvooru
- Location in Andhra Pradesh, India Viruvooru (India)
- Coordinates: 15.069098°N 79.350468°E
- Country: India
- State: Andhra Pradesh
- District: Sri Amarajeevi Potti Sri Ramulu Nellore district
- Mandal: Varikuntapadu

Languages
  - Official: Telugu
- Time zone: UTC+5:30 (IST)
- PIN: 524236
- Vehicle registration: Varikuntapadu
- Nearest city: Nellore
- Lok Sabha constituency: Nellore
- Vidhan Sabha constituency: Udayagiri

Viruvuru is a panchayat village in the Nellore district of Andhra Pradesh, India. It is situated on the exact bank of river Pennar (on the other bank one more village namely Sangam), 130 kilometres from Nellore.

The Pennar River is an important geographical feature of Andhra Pradesh, and its surrounding areas have traditionally supported agricultural activities and rural communities. Viruvuru's position near the river provides a distinctive setting within Nellore district.
