= Thippavarappadu =

- village
- Interactive map of Thippavarappadu
- Location in Andhra Pradesh, India Thippavarappadu (India)
- Coordinates: 14.1610743°N 79.77845758°E
- Country: India
- State: Andhra Pradesh
- District: Nellore
- Mandal: Gudur

Government
  - Sarpanch: Dasari Bebirani

Population (2011)
  - Total: 2,537

Languages
  - Official: Telugu
- Time zone: UTC+5:30 (IST)
- PIN: 524406
- Telephone code: 8624
- Vehicle registration: AP 26

Thippavarappadu is a large village located in Gudur mandal of Sri Potti Sriramulu Nellore district, Andhra Pradesh with total 706 families residing.

== Demographics ==
Thippavarappadu has population of 2537 of which 1246 are males while 1291 are females as per Population Census 2011. Population of children with age 0-6 is 233 which makes up 9.18% of total population of village. Average Sex Ratio of Thippavarappadu village is 1036 which is higher than Andhra Pradesh state average of 993. Child Sex Ratio for the Thippavarappadu as per census is 1044, higher than Andhra Pradesh average of 939. Thippavarappadu village has lower literacy rate compared to Andhra Pradesh. In 2011, literacy rate of Thippavarappadu village was 64.15% compared to 67.02% of Andhra Pradesh. In Thippavarappadu Male literacy stands at 69.35% while female literacy rate was 59.13%.

As per constitution of India and Panchyati Raaj Act, Thippavarappadu village is administrated by Sarpanch (Head of Village) who is elected representative of village.
