= Chillakur mandal =

Mandal in Nellore district, Andhra Pradesh, India

- Mandal
- Interactive map of Chillakur mandal
- Location within Andhra Pradesh Location within India
- Coordinates: 14°7′48″N 79°52′5″E
- Country: India
- State: Andhra Pradesh
- District: Nellore
- Revenue division: Gudur
- Headquarters: Chillakur

Government
  - MLA: Varaprasad Rao Velagapalli (YSRCP)
  - MP: Maddila Gurumoorthy

Area
  - Mandal: 323.25 km^{2} (124.81 sq mi)
  - Urban: 0 km^{2} (0 sq mi)
  - Rural: 323.25 km^{2} (124.81 sq mi)

Population (2011)
  - Mandal: 53,138
  - Density: 164.39/km^{2} (425.76/sq mi)
  - Urban: 687
  - Rural: 52,451
- Time zone: UTC+05:30 (IST)

Chillakur mandal is one of the mandal in Nellore district in the Indian state of Andhra Pradesh. It is a part of Gudur revenue division and is headquartered at Chillakur.

== History ==
Chillakur mandal was a part of Nellore district until 2022. It was made part of the newly formed Tirupati district effective from 4 April 2022 by the Y. S. Jagan Mohan Reddy-led Government of Andhra Pradesh.

== Demographics ==
Religions in Chillakur mandal (2011)
| Religion | Percent |
| Hindus | 93.48% |
| Muslims | 5.62% |
| Christians | 0.53% |
| Others or not stated | 0.36% |
Distribution of religions

As per 2011 census, Chillakur mandal had a total population of 53,138 with 27,376 male population and 25,762 female population with a density of 164/km^{2}. It had a sex ratio of 941, making it the mandal with lowest sex ratio in the erstwhile Nellore district. Scheduled Castes and Scheduled Tribes made up 16,806 and 8,490 of the population respectively. It had a literacy rate of 60.05% with 66.8% among males and 52.84% among females.

== Administration ==
Chillakur mandal is a part of Gudur revenue division. The headquarters are located at Chillakur. As of 2011 census, the mandal comprises the following 30 villages:

Village
Addepalle
Ankulapaturu
Annambaka
Ballavolu
Budanam
Chillakur
Chinthavaram
Kadivedu
Kalava Konda
Ippapudi*
Momidi
Mutyalapadu
Nakkalakalva Khandrika
Nelaballi
Oduru
Pallamala
Pallamala Khandrika*
Pentapadu
Ponnavolu
Thamminapatnam
Theepanur
Thikkavaram
Thonukumala
Turpu Kanupur
Udathavaripalem
Udathavariparlapalle
Vallipadu
Vellapalem
Yeruru
Yogeswarunipalle

- Note: Ippapudi and Pallamala Khandrika were uninhabited

== Economy ==
In 2019, a desalination plant was proposed to be set up in the mandal to resolve drinking water issues in the erstwhile Nellore district.

=== Agriculture ===
Rice is the major crop grown in the mandal primarily during the Rabi season. Greengram and Blackgram are also cultivated during Rabi season although sparsely. Groundnuts, fresh and dry fruits are grown widely during the Kharif season and less prominently during the Rabi season.

=== Industrial sector ===
The mandal is proposed to be a part of the Chennai Bangalore Industrial Corridor. Kriscity, an industrial city comprising educational institutions, skill development units, research and development projects, residential, commercial, and tourism projects is proposed to be set up in the area.

== Politics ==
Chillakur mandal is a part of Gudur Assembly constituency and Tirupati Lok Sabha constituency. As of 1 January 2018, Chillakur mandal had 36,132 eligible voters with 17,849 male voters and 18,283 female voters. Varaprasad Rao Velagapalli is representing the Gudur constituency as the Member of the Legislative Assembly (MLA) in Andhra Pradesh Legislative Assembly, and Maddila Gurumoorthy is representing the Tirupati constituency as the Member of Parliament (MP) in Lok Sabha.
