= Reddypalem =

Reddypalem may refer to:

- Reddypalem, Guntur, a neighborhood in the Guntur, Andhra Pradesh, India
- Rama Reddy Palem, a village in Chillakur mandal, Nellore district, Andhra Pradesh, India
- Kotha Reddy Palem, a village in Prakasam district, Andhra Pradesh, India
