= Ulavapalli =

- Interactive map of Ulavapalli
- Ulavapalli within the map of Andhra Pradesh Ulavapalli (India)
- Coordinates: 14.53983°N 79.583876°E
- Country: India
- State: Andhra Pradesh
- District: Sri Potti Sri Ramulu Nellore
- Mandal: Chejerla

Languages
  - Official: Telugu
- Time zone: UTC+5:30 (IST)

Ulavapalli is a village in Chejerla mandal, Sri Potti Sri Ramulu Nellore district, Andhra Pradesh, India.
