= Chennavarappadu =

- Village
- Interactive map of Chennavarappadu
- Location in Andhra Pradesh, India
- Coordinates: 14.631962°N 79.792420°E
- Country: India
- State: Andhra Pradesh
- District: Nellore

Population (2011)
  - Total: 803

Languages
  - Official: Telugu
- Time zone: UTC+5:30 (IST)

Chennavarappadu is a village in Sangam mandal, located in Nellore district of Indian state of Andhra Pradesh.
