= Rama Reddy Palem =

Coordinates: 14°08′27.7″N 80°0′31.3″E

Rama Reddy Palem is a village in Chillakur mandal, Nellore district. The primary occupation is agriculture.
