= Gudur mandal, Nellore district =

Gudur mandal
- Mandal
- Interactive map of Gudur mandal
- Location in Andhra Pradesh, India
- Coordinates: 14.1473°N 79.8477°E
- Country: India
- State: Andhra Pradesh
- District: Nellore
- Headquarters: Gudur

Population (2011)
  - Total: 116,330

Languages
  - Official: Telugu
- Time zone: UTC+5:30 (IST)

Gudur mandal is one of the mandal in Nellore district of the state of Andhra Pradesh, India. Its headquarters are located at Gudur. The mandal is situated on the coast of Bay of Bengal, bounded by Sydapuram, Manubolu, Balayapalle, Ojili and Chillakur mandals. It is a part of Gudur revenue division.

== Demographics ==
As of 2011 census, the mandal had a population of 116,330. The total population constitute, 57,680 males and 58,650 females —a sex ratio of 1017 females per 1000 males. 11,659 children are in the age group of 0–6 years, of which 5,942 are boys and 5,717 are girls —a ratio of 962 per 1000. The average literacy rate stands at 71.85% with 75,205 literates.

== Towns and villages ==
Chennuru – II is the most populated and Reddigunta is the least populated settlement in the mandal. As of 2011 census, the mandal has 23 settlements, that includes the following towns and villages:

1. Ayyavaripalem
2. Chemidthi
3. Chennuru – I
4. Chennuru – II
5. East Gudur (rural)
6. Gollapalle
7. Kandali
8. Kandra
9. Kommaneturu
10. Kondagunta
11. Kundakuru
12. Mangalapur
13. Mekanur
14. Mittathmakuru
15. Nellatur (rural)
16. Nernur
17. Palicherla
18. Palicherlarajupalem
19. Reddigunta
20. Vedicherla
21. Vendodu
22. Vinduru
23. West Gudur (rural)

Sources:

- Census India 2011 (sub districts)
- Revenue Department of AP
