= Pepala vari palem =

Pepala vari palem is one of the villages in Chalamcharla panchayath region in Kavali mandal and Nellore district.
