= Puttamraju Kandriga =

Puttamraju Kandriga is a village in Nellore district, Andhra Pradesh, India. The village was adopted by cricketeer Sachin Tendulkar as part of the development program Sansad Adarsh Gram Yojana. Over two years, the village set up power and water supplies, improved its roads, and did away with open defecation.
