= Narrawada =

- Village
- Interactive map of Narrawada
- Location in Andhra Pradesh, India Narrawada (India)
- Coordinates: 14°54′24″N 79°25′20″E
- Country: India
- State: Andhra Pradesh
- District: Nellore District
- Elevation: 20 m (66 ft)

Population
  - Total: 1,500

Languages
  - Official: Telugu
- Time zone: UTC+5:30 (IST)
- PIN: 524222

Narrawada is a small historic village located 7 km from Duttalur in Nellore District in Andhra Pradesh, India.

== Demography and culture ==
The village population is around 1,500. The major occupation of the inhabitants include agriculture and livestock. People predominantly speak Telugu.
