= Damegunta =

- Village
- Interactive map of Damegunta
- Location in Andhra Pradesh, India Damegunta (India)
- Coordinates: 14.6044913°N 80.0171609°E
- Country: India
- State: Andhra Pradesh
- District: Nellore

Population
  - Total: 1,394
  - Rank: 2011

Languages
  - Official: Telugu
- Time zone: UTC+5:30 (IST)
- PIN: 524316
- Telephone code: +91–8622
- Vehicle registration: AP-26

Damegunta is a village in Kodavalur mandal, situated in Nellore district of the Indian state of Andhra Pradesh.In Damegunta village population of children with age 0–6 is 122 which makes up 8.75 % of total population of village.
