= Ramanapalem =

Ramannapalem is a village in Nellore district in the state of Andhra Pradesh in India.
