= Mudivarthi =

- village
- Interactive map of Mudivarthi
- Location in Andhra Pradesh, India Mudivarthi (India)
- Coordinates: 14°31′16″N 80°6′16″E
- Country: India
- State: Andhra Pradesh
- District: Nellore

Languages
  - Official: Telugu
- Time zone: UTC+5:30 (IST)
- PIN: 524137
- Telephone code: 08622
- Vehicle registration: AP-26
- Nearest city: Kovur

Mudivarthi is a village in the Nellore District of Andhra Pradesh, on the east coast of India. It is located 20 km (12 mi) from Nellore city, and 15 km (9.3 mi) from Kovur.

The area postal pin code is 524137.
