= Kammavari palli =

- Village
- Location in Andhra Pradesh, India
- Country: India
- State: Andhra Pradesh

Languages
  - Official: Telugu
- Time zone: UTC+5:30 (IST)
- Postal code: 524301

Kammavari palli, also known as Kammavaripalli, is a village located in the Nellore district in Andhra Pradesh, India. It is close to the banks of the Penna River.
