= Thoorpu Dubagunta, Nellore district =

Thurpu Dubagunta
- Village
- Interactive map of Thurpu Dubagunta
- Location in Andhra Pradesh, India
- Coordinates: 14.918537°N 79.722408°E
- Country: India
- State: Andhra Pradesh
- District: Nellore

Languages
  - Official: Telugu
- Time zone: UTC+5:30 (IST)
- PIN: 524224
- Vehicle registration: AP26
- Nearest city: Kavali

Dubagunta (also known as Thurpu Dubagunta) is a village panchayat located in Nellore district of Andhra Pradesh.
