= Vendodu =

Coordinates: 14°03′N 79°45′E

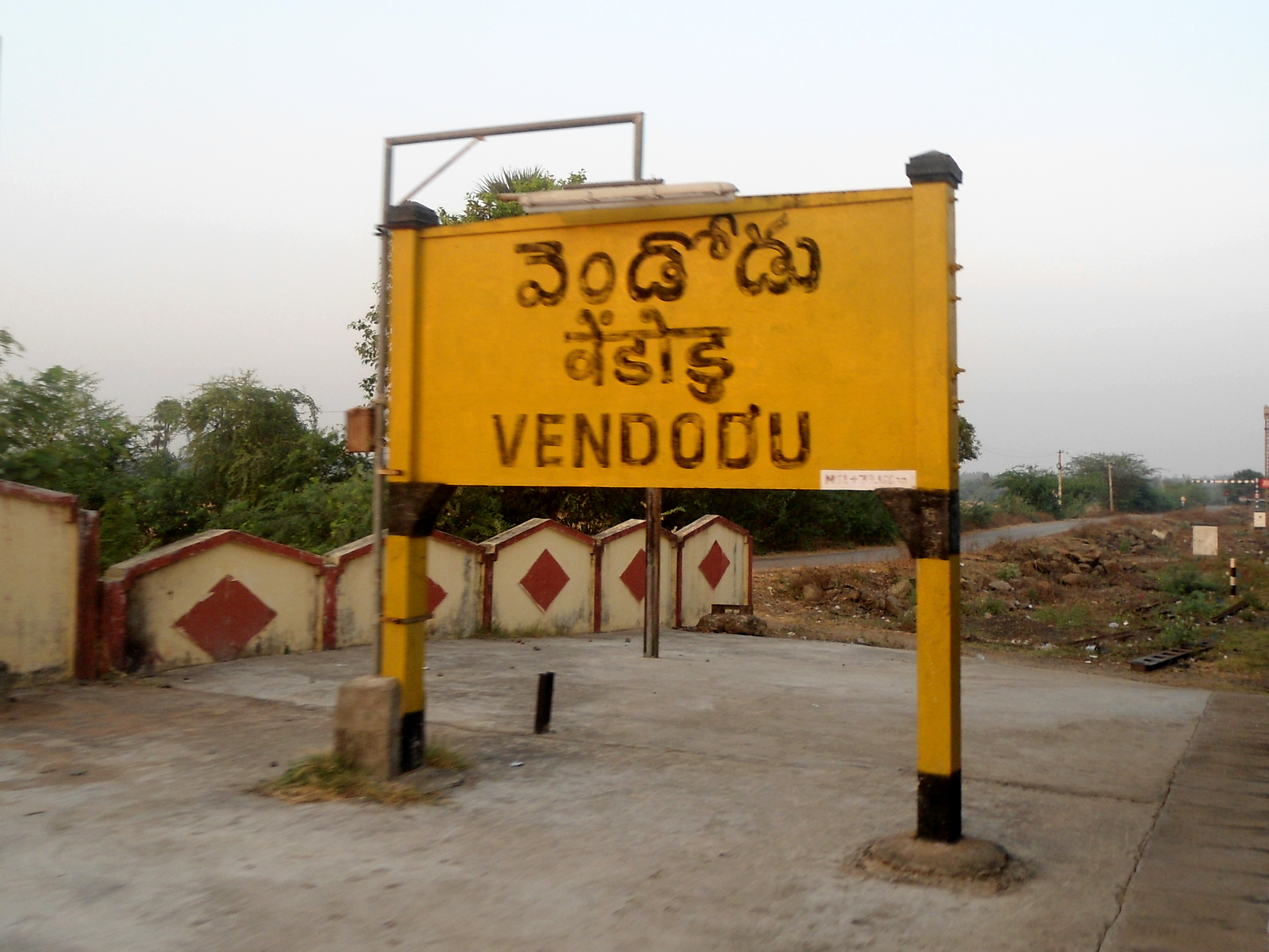
Vendodu Railway Station

Vendodu is one of the major panchayati in Gudur Mandel, at Nellore District. Vendodu VDD Train Station connects it to other towns. Agriculture is the major source of economy.
