= Thinnelapudi =

Coordinates: 14°0′38″N 80°2′34″E

Thinnelapudi is a village in Kota mandel, Nellore district, Andhra Pradesh, India.
