= Cheerla Vari Kandrika =

Village in India

Cheerla Vari Kandrika is a very remote village located in Chejerla mandal, Nellore District, Andhra Pradesh, India.

In the rainy seasons, there is a chance of sudden floods due to the water streams, blocking the roads to the village.

The village doesn't have proper road or public transport facilities, and is located 70 kilometres (43 mi) from district headquarters
