= Periyavaram =

- village
- Interactive map of Periyavaram
- Location in Andhra Pradesh, India Periyavaram (India)
- Coordinates: 13°55′54″N 79°36′27″E
- Country: India
- State: Andhra Pradesh
- District: Tirupati

Population
  - Total: 300

Languages
  - Official: Telugu
- Time zone: UTC+5:30 (IST)
- PIN: 524132
- Vehicle registration: AP-
- Nearest city: Tirupati

Periyavaram is a village in Venkatagiri mandal, Tirupati district, Andhra Pradesh, India.

Periyavaram is located near to Venkatagiri, 1 km away from Venkatagiri railway station. The village consists of around 30 to 50 houses, with a population of 300.
