= Bheemavarappadu =

- Village
- Interactive map of Bheemavarappadu
- Location in Andhra Pradesh, India
- Coordinates: 15.019163°N 79.7734934°E
- Country: India
- State: Andhra Pradesh
- District: Nellore
- Mandal: Kondapuram

Population
  - Total: 1,078

Languages
  - Official: Telugu
  - Other spoken: Hindi
- Time zone: UTC+5:30 (IST)
- Postal code: 524201
- Website: nelkondapbheemagp.appr.gov.in

Bheemavarappadu is a small village in Kondapuram mandal of Nellore district, Andhra Pradesh, India.
