= Menakuru =

- Village
- Interactive map of Menakuru
- Location in Andhra Pradesh, India
- Coordinates: 13°55′00″N 79°50′30″E
- Country: India
- State: Andhra Pradesh
- District: Tirupati

Languages
  - Official: Telugu
- Time zone: UTC+5:30 (IST)
- PIN: 524 421
- Telephone code: +91–8623
- Vehicle registration: AP–26

Menakuru is a village located in the Naidupeta mandal of Tirupati district, Andhra Pradesh, India. It is a designated Special Economic Zone (SEZ).
