= Pangili =

Village in Andhra Pradesh, India

- Village
- Location within Andhra Pradesh Location within India
- Coordinates: 14°12′49″N 79°30′24″E
- Country: India
- State: Andhra Pradesh
- District: Nellore
- Mandal: Rapur

Area
  - Total: 23.56 km^{2} (9.10 sq mi)
- Elevation: 96 m (315 ft)

Population (2011)
  - Total: 1,985
  - Density: 84.25/km^{2} (218.2/sq mi)

Languages
  - Official: Telugu
- Time zone: UTC+5:30 (IST)
- PIN: 524408

Pangili is a village in Rapur Taluk of Nellore District of Andhra Pradesh in India. It is located near National Highway 565, at an average elevation of 96 metres above the sea level. As of the year 2011, it had a population of 1,985.
