= Saipeta =

Saipeta Lakshmi Puram
- village
- Interactive map of Saipeta
- Location in Andhra Pradesh, India Saipeta (India)
- Coordinates: 15°1′56″N 79°45′28″E
- Country: India
- State: Andhra Pradesh
- District: Nellore

Government
  - Body: Panchayat

Population
  - Total: 5,220

Languages
  - Official: Telugu
- Time zone: UTC+5:30 (IST)
- PIN: 524201
- Telephone code: 08626-2470
- Vehicle registration: AP-26
- Nearest city: Kavali
- Lok Sabha constituency: Nellore

Saipeta is a village in Kondapuram mandal in Sri Potti Sriramulu Nellore district on the East Coast of India in the state of Andhra Pradesh.
