= Nellore urban mandal =

- Mandal
- Interactive map of Nellore urban mandal
- Location in Andhra Pradesh, India
- Coordinates: 14.442599°N 79.986456°E
- Country: India
- State: Andhra Pradesh
- District: Nellore
- Headquarters: Nellore

Languages
  - Official: Telugu
- Time zone: UTC+5:30 (IST)

Nellore urban mandal is a mandal in Nellore district of the state of Andhra Pradesh, India. Its headquarters are located at Nellore. It is formed by dividing Nellore mandal into Nellore urban and Nellore rural mandals as part of districts reorganisation on 4 April 2022.

== Towns and villages ==
1. Nellore (town)
2. Buja Buja Nellore (rural)
