= Kavali revenue division =

- revenue division
- Country: India
- State: Andhra Pradesh
- District: Nellore

Kavali revenue division (or Kavali division) is an administrative division in the Nellore district of the Indian state of Andhra Pradesh. It is one of the 4 revenue divisions in the district with 12 mandals under its administration. The divisional headquarters are located at Nellore city.

== Administration ==
Kondapuram and Varkuntapadu mandals are made part of Kavali revenue division as the part of districts restructure effective 31 Dec 2025. The mandals administered under the revenue division are:

1. Allur
2. Bogole
3. Dagadarthi
4. Duttalur
5. Jaladanki
6. Kaligiri
7. Kavali
8. Kodavalur
9. Kondapuram
10. Varikuntapadu
11. Vidavalur
12. Vinjamur

== See also ==
- List of revenue divisions in Andhra Pradesh
- List of mandals in Andhra Pradesh
