= Veguru =

- Village
- Interactive map of Veguru
- Location in Andhra Pradesh, India Veguru (India)
- Coordinates: 14°32′15″N 80°3′16″E
- Country: India
- State: Andhra Pradesh
- District: Nellore

Languages
  - Official: Telugu
- Time zone: UTC+5:30 (IST)
- PIN: 524137
- Telephone code: 08622
- Vehicle registration: AP 26

Veguru is a village located in Nellore District of Andhra Pradesh, on the east coast of India.
