= Botikarlapadu =

Coordinates: 15°15′N 79°24′E

- Village
- Interactive map of Botikarlapadu
- Location in Andhra Pradesh, India Botikarlapadu (India)
- Country: India
- State: Andhra Pradesh
- District: Nellore

Population
  - Total: 500

Languages
  - Official: Telugu
- Time zone: UTC+5:30 (IST)

Botikarlapadu is a small village near Atmakur, Nellore, Nellore district, Andhra Pradesh, India and also near Kanigiri, Prakasam District, Andhra Pradesh. Both villages have a similar population of approx. 500 people. A few people even from these small villages are working in US and other European countries.
