= Kavali mandal =

- Mandal
- Interactive map of Kavali mandal
- Location in Andhra Pradesh, India
- Coordinates: 13.65°N 79.52°E
- Country: India
- State: Andhra Pradesh
- District: Nellore
- Headquarters: Kavali

Area
  - Total: 324 km^{2} (125 sq mi)

Population (2011)
  - Total: 150,333
  - Density: 464/km^{2} (1,200/sq mi)

Languages
  - Official: Telugu
- Time zone: UTC+5:30 (IST)
- PIN: 524201
- Vehicle registration: AP26

Kavali mandal is one of the 38 mandals in Nellore district of the Indian state of Andhra Pradesh. Its headquarters are located at Kavali. The mandal is bounded by .This mandal is located at Kavali revenue division.

== Demographics ==
As of 2011 census, the mandal had a population of 1,50,333. The total population constitute, 75,206 males and 75,127 females —a sex ratio of 999 females per 1000 males. 8,365 children are in the age group of 0–6 years, of which 4,276 are boys and 4,089 are girls —a ratio of 999 per 1000. The average literacy rate stands at 70.98% with 95,515 literates.

== Towns and villages ==
As of 2011 census, the mandal has 16 settlements. It includes 1 town and 15 villages. is the most populated and Anagunta is the least populated villages in the mandal.

The settlements in the mandal are listed below:

1. Kavali (M)
2. Anemadugu
3. Budamagunta
4. Chalamcherla
5. Chennayapalem
6. Gowravaram
7. Kavali Bit - I
8. Kavali Bit - II (Rural)
9. Kothapalle
10. Maddurupadu (Part)
11. Mannangidinne
12. Musunuru (Part)
13. Rajuvari Chintala Palem
14. Rudrakota
15. Thummalapenta

== See also ==
- List of mandals in Andhra Pradesh
