= Damaramadugu =

- village
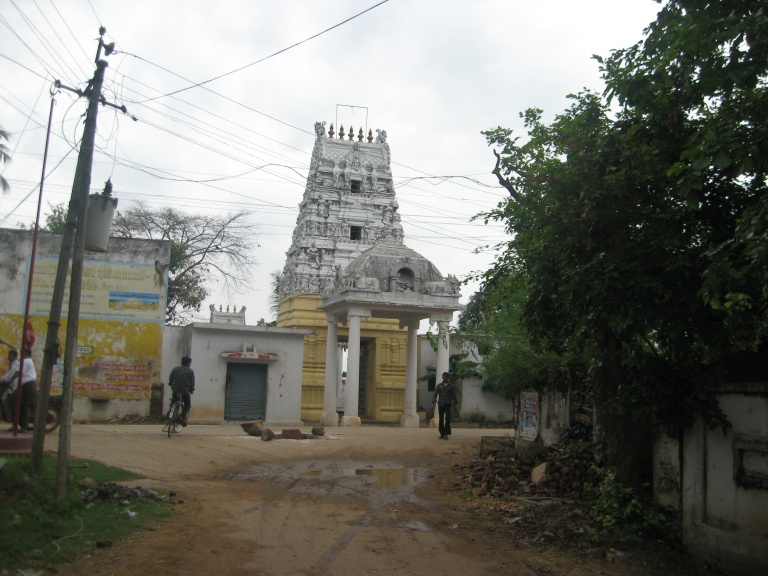
- Sivalayam in Damaramadugu
- Interactive map of Damaramadugu
- Location in Andhra Pradesh, India Damaramadugu (India)
- Coordinates: 14.501624°N 79.931928°E
- Country: India
- State: Andhra Pradesh

Population (2011)
  - Total: 7,294

Languages
  - Official: Telugu
- Time zone: UTC+5:30 (IST)
- Postal code: 524137

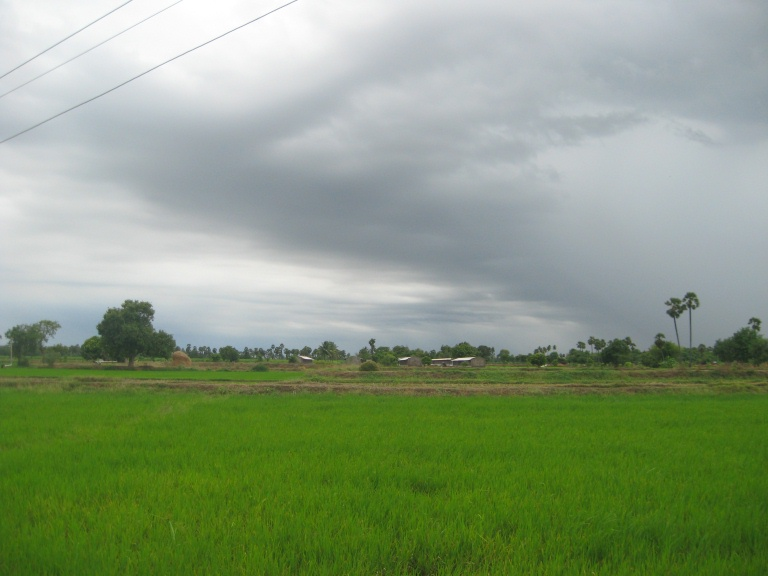
Rice Fields in Damaramadugu

Damaramadugu is an agricultural village located in Buchireddipalem mandal of Nellore district, Andhra Pradesh, India.
