= Atmakur mandal, Nellore district =

Atmakur mandal
- Mandal
- Interactive map of Atmakur mandal
- Location in Andhra Pradesh, India
- Coordinates: 14.6167°N 79.6167°E
- Country: India
- State: Andhra Pradesh
- District: Nellore
- Headquarters: Atmakur

Area
  - Total: 324 km^{2} (125 sq mi)

Population (2011)
  - Total: 150,333
  - Density: 464/km^{2} (1,200/sq mi)

Languages
  - Official: Telugu
- Time zone: UTC+5:30 (IST)
- PIN: 524201
- Vehicle registration: AP26

Atmakur mandal is one of the 38 mandals in Nellore district of the Indian state of Andhra Pradesh. Its headquarters are located at Atmakur. The mandal is located at Atmakur revenue division.

== Demographics ==
As of 2011 census, the mandal had a population of 61,217. The total population constitute, 30,790 males and 30,427 females —a sex ratio of 988 females per 1000 males. 5954 children are in the age group of 0–6 years, of which 3026 are boys and 2928 are girls —a ratio of 968 per 1000. The average literacy rate stands at 69.05% with 38,161 literates.

== Towns and villages ==
As of 2011 census, the mandal has 16 settlements. It includes 1 town and 15 villages. is the most populated and Anagunta is the least populated villages in the mandal.

The settlements in the mandal are listed below:

1. Gandlavedu
2. Botikarlapadu
3. Padakandla
4. Aravedu
5. Karatampadu
6. Boyila Chiruvella
7. Nabbinagaram
8. Pamidipadu
9. Nellorepalem
10. Chiruvella Khandrika
11. Narampeta
12. Mahimalur
13. Nagulapadu
14. Jangalapalle
15. Depuru
16. Bandarupalle
17. Kanupurupalle
18. Nuvvurupadu
19. Vasili
20. Battepadu

== See also ==
- List of mandals in Andhra Pradesh
