= Siddana konduru =

- village
- Interactive map of Siddana konduru
- Location in Andhra Pradesh, India
- Country: India
- State: Andhra Pradesh
- District: Nellore

Languages
  - Official: Telugu
- Time zone: UTC+5:30 (IST)
- PIN: 524225
- Telephone code: 08626
- Vehicle registration: AP-26

Siddana Konduru is a village in Nellore district, Andhra Pradesh, India.
