= Kaluvoya =

- Village
- Interactive map of Kaluvoya
- Location in Andhra Pradesh, India Kaluvoya (India)
- Coordinates: 14.5000°N 79.4167°E
- Country: India
- State: Andhra Pradesh
- Elevation: 122 m (400 ft)

Population (2019)
  - Total: 30,000

Languages
  - Official: Telugu
- Time zone: UTC+5:30 (IST)
- Postal code: 524343
- Vehicle registration: AP

Kaluvoya or Kaluvaya is a village and a Mandal in Nellore district in the state of Andhra Pradesh in India.

== Geography ==
Kaluvaya is located at 14.5000°N 79.4167°E. and has an altitude of 91m.
