= Gandipalem =

- Village
- Interactive map of Gandipalem
- Location in Andhra Pradesh, India Gandipalem (India)
- Coordinates: 14°59′56″N 79°18′36″E
- Country: India
- State: Andhra Pradesh
- District: Nellore District

Area
  - Total: 10.14 km^{2} (3.92 sq mi)
- Elevation: 20 m (66 ft)

Population (2011)
  - Total: 3,481
  - Density: 343.3/km^{2} (889.1/sq mi)

Languages
  - Official: Telugu
- Time zone: UTC+5:30 (IST)
- PIN: 524236
- Telephone code: 08620

Gandipalem is a small village in Nellore District in Andhra Pradesh, India.

== Demography and culture ==
The Gandipalem village has population of 3481 with total 865 families of which 1800 are males while 1681 are females as per Census 2011. The average human sex ratio is 934. The Child Sex Ratio is 980. The Male literacy rate is 83.44% while female literacy rate is 56.70% and combined literacy is 70.57%.

The number of workers are 1494. The occupations of the village are farming and animal husbandry. People predominantly speak Telugu.
