= Chaganam Rajupalem =

- Village
- Interactive map of Chaganam Rajupalem
- Location in Andhra Pradesh, India
- Coordinates: 14°12′17″N 79°40′54″E
- Country: India
- State: Andhra Pradesh

Languages
  - Official: Telugu
- Time zone: UTC+5:30 (IST)
- Postal code: 524407
- Telephone code: +91–8621
- Vehicle registration: AP-26

Chaganam Rajupalem is a village panchayath located in the Sydapuram Mandal, Nellore district of Andhra Pradesh state, India.

== Demographics ==
The local language of the village is Telugu. The total population is 2,987. Males are 1,517 and females are 1,470, living in 728 houses. The total area of Chaganam is 30.24 square kilometers.
