= Madamanuru =

Coordinates: 14°14′N 79°51′E

Madamanuru is a village located in Manubolu mandal of Nellore, Andhra Pradesh, India. According to Census 2011 information the location code or village code of Madamanuru village is 592198. It is situated 11km away from sub-district headquarter Manubolu and 37km away from district headquarter Nellore. As per 2009 stats, Madamanur is the gram panchayat of Madamanuru village.

The total geographical area of village is 2733 hectares. Madamanuru has a total population of 3,676 people. There are about 1,056 houses in Madamanuru village. Gudur is nearest town to Madamanuru which is approximately 18km away.

== Demographics ==
Telugu is the Local Language here. Total population of Madamanur is 3341. Males are 1676 and Females are 1,665 living in 886 Houses. Total area of Madamanur is 2733 hectares.

== Transportation ==
=== Road ===
Gudur is the Nearest Town to Madamanur. Gudur is 18 km from Madamanur. Road connectivity is there from Gudur to Madamanur.

=== Rail ===
Manubolu Rail Way Station is the very nearby railway stations to Madamanur. Also you can consider railway Stations from Near By town Gudur. Manubolu Rail Way Station, Venkatachalam Rail Way Station are the railway Stations near to Gudur. You can reach from Gudur to Madamanur by road after. However, Nellore Railway Station is a major railway station 32 km from Madamanur

=== Bus ===
Nellore Bypass APSRTC Bus Station, Gudur Bypass APSRTC Bus Station, Gudur APSRTC Bus Station are the nearby by Bus Stations to Madamanur. APSRTC runs Number of busses from major cities to here.
