= Daggavolu =

- Village
- Location in Andhra Pradesh, India Daggavolu (India)
- Coordinates: 14.1129991°N 79.6637321°E
- Country: India
- State: Andhra Pradesh
- District: Tirupati

Population
  - Total: 3,000

Languages
  - Official: Telugu
- Time zone: UTC+5:30 (IST)
- Vehicle registration: AP
- Nearest city: Gudur and Venkatagiri
- Lok Sabha constituency: Tirupati
- Vidhan Sabha constituency: Venkatagiri

Daggavolu is a village in Dakkili mandal, in the Tirupati district of Andhra Pradesh, India. It was part of Nellore district before June 2022 restructure.
