= Kodivaka =

- Village
- Interactive map of Kodivaka
- Location in Andhra Pradesh, India
- Coordinates: 13.9920345°N 80.0971571°E
- Country: India
- State: Andhra Pradesh
- District: Tirupati Balaji
- Elevation: 33 m (108 ft)

Population (2011)
  - Total: 460

Languages
  - Official: Telugu
- Time zone: UTC+5:30 (IST)
- Postal code: 524403
- Vehicle registration: AP 26

Kodivaka is a village located about 5km from the town of Vakadu in Tirupati district, Andhra Pradesh, India. It is predominantly an agriculture village with paddy fields and cattle.
