= Gudur, Nalgonda district =

Gudur
- Bibinagar Mandal
- Location in Telangana, India Gudur (India)
- Coordinates: 17°29′50″N 78°49′05″E
- Country: India
- State: Telangana

Population (2012)
  - Total: 2,001

Languages
  - Official: Telugu
- Time zone: UTC+5:30 (IST)
- PIN Code: 508116

Gudur is one of the largest villages in BibiNagar Mandal in Nalgonda district, Telangana, India.
