= Chennur, Nellore district =

Chennur
- town
- Interactive map of Chennur
- Location in Andhra Pradesh, India Chennur (India)
- Coordinates: 14.14733°N 79.847712°E
- Country: India
- State: Andhra Pradesh
- District: SPSR Nellore district
- Mandal: Gudur

Languages
  - Official: Telugu
- Time zone: UTC+5:30 (IST)
- Telephone code: 08624
- Nearest city: Nellore (city)

Chennur is a village in Gudur mandal, Nellore district of the Indian state of Andhra Pradesh.

== Demographics ==
As of 2001 India census, Chennur had a population of 9,303. Males constitute 50% of the population. Chennur has an average literacy rate of 47%.

As per the constitution of India and Panchyati Raaj Act, Chennuru village is administrated by Sarpanch (Head of Village) who is elected representative of village.

Dussera celebrations take place in a grand manner in this village.

Chennuru has many educated families and the nearest town from chennuru is Gudur. Most of the business people in gudur are from this village.

All major schools in Gudur has bus transport service to this village.

Temples in the village: Shivalayam, Chennakeshavalayam, Anjaneya devastanam, Kattalamma, Sai baba alayam, Grama devata,

Schools: Mitra Mandali, Bethani English medium school, Saraswati vidhyalayam, Govt School, Govt High school for Boys and Girls.
