= D. Velampalli =

D. Velampalli is a small village in Dakkili mandal Tirupati District, Andhra Pradesh. It consists of 80 to 100 families, with a total population of about 600.
