= North Rajupalem =

North Rajupalem is a major village in Kodavalur mandal, Nellore district, Andhra Pradesh, India. North Rajupalem (NRP) is developed industrially, agriculturally. It is one of the major educational hubs in Kodavlur mandal. It is located 12 km from district headquarters Nellore.
