= Koneti Raju Palem =

- Village
- Interactive map of Koneti Raju Palem
- Location in Andhra Pradesh, India Koneti Raju Palem (India)
- Country: India
- State: Andhra Pradesh
- District: Tirupati

Languages
  - Official: Telugu
- Time zone: UTC+5:30 (IST)

Koneti Raju Palem is a small village in the Naidupeta mandal Tirupati district of Andhra Pradesh, India.
