= Ramapuram, Tirupati district =

Ramapuram
- village
- Interactive map of Ramapuram
- Location in Andhra Pradesh, India
- Coordinates: 13.52°N 80.092°E
- Country: India
- State: Andhra Pradesh
- District: Tirupati
- Elevation: 5 m (16 ft)

Population (2011)
  - Total: 3,849

Languages
  - Official: Telugu
- Time zone: UTC+5:30 (IST)
- PIN: 524401

Ramapuram is a village in the Tada mandal of Tirupati district in the state of Andhra Pradesh.

== Geography ==
Ramapuram is located at 13.52°N 80.092°E. The town is sandwiched between the states of Tamil Nadu (Arambakkam) and Andhra Pradesh and is a part of Tirupati district of the latter. Together with the hamlet of Pannamgadu, these two places are connected with the rest of Andhra Pradesh with a very narrow strip of land. Most of the population speak both Telugu and Tamil and sign boards, too display both of these languages.
It has an average elevation of 5 metres. The population for 7 km radius from this point is approximately 47956 persons.

== Nearby Cities and Towns ==
One of India's key highways, the National Highway 16 directly passes through this town. The nearest railway stations are Arambakkam (1.4 km), Sri City (7.7 km), Sunnambukkulam (4.4 km), Irakam (5.7 km) and Gummidipundi (8.0 km) away.
