= Marlagunta =

Human settlement in India

Coordinates: 14°07′N 79°33′E

Marlagunta is a village in Dakkili mandal, located in the Tirupati district of Andhra Pradesh, India.

Agriculture and weaving are the main source of income for people in this village.

As a part of development for the village and farmers of it, government recently made a passage of canal a water source coming from kandaleru dam.

The postal code (Pincode) for Marlagunta village is 524134.
