= Ananthasagaram =

- Village
- Interactive map of Ananthasagaram
- Location in Andhra Pradesh, India
- Coordinates: 14°34′17″N 79°24′27″E
- Country: India
- State: Andhra Pradesh
- District: SPSR Nellore
- Elevation: 61 m (200 ft)

Languages
  - Official: Telugu
- Time zone: UTC+5:30 (IST)
- PIN: 524302
- Telephone code: 91 08628
- Vehicle registration: AP

Ananthasagaram is a village and headquarters of Mandal with same name in Nellore district in the state of Andhra Pradesh in India.

== Geography ==
Ananthasagaram village is 79 km (49 mi) from Nellore.

It has a pond (cheruvu) :- Ananthasagaram AnanthasagaramCheruvu

== Demographics ==
As of 2011 census, the village had a population of 8,588. The total population constitute 4,436 males and 4,152 females. Average sex ratio of the village is 936 for per 1000.
