= Thotapalli Gudur =

- Village
- Interactive map of Thotapalli Gudur
- Location in Andhra Pradesh, India Thotapalli Gudur (India)
- Coordinates: 14.3833°N 80.1000°E
- Country: India
- State: Andhra Pradesh
- District: Nellore
- Elevation: 4 m (13 ft)

Languages
  - Official: Telugu
- Time zone: UTC+5:30 (IST)
- Vehicle registration: AP

Thotapalli Gudur is a village in Nellore district in the state of Andhra Pradesh in India.

== Geography ==
Totapalli Gudur is located at 14.3833°N 80.1000°E. It has an average elevation of 4 meters (16 feet).
