= Marripadu, Nellore district =

Coordinates: 14°44′16″N 79°18′36″E

Marripadu
- Village
- Interactive map of Marripadu
- Country: India
- State: Andhra Pradesh
- District: Nellore
- Constituency: Atmakur

Languages
  - Official: Telugu
- Time zone: UTC+5:30 (IST)
- Vehicle registration: AP 26

Marripadu is a village and a Mandal in Nellore district in the state of Andhra Pradesh in India. It is located at the border of Nellore District. It produces tobacco. It is on the banks of small river called Boggeru. Somasila Project, Udayagiri are the adjacent tourist places.
