= Kokkupalem =

Coordinates: 14°04′N 80°04′E

Kokkupalem is a small village in Chittamur mandal, Tirupati district, Andhra Pradesh state, India.
