= Seetharamapuram =

- Village
- Nickname: SR Puram
- Interactive map of Seetharamapuram
- Location in Andhra Pradesh, India Seetharamapuram (India)
- Coordinates: 15.016°N 79.137°E
- Country: India
- State: Andhra Pradesh
- District: Nellore

Government
  - Type: mandal
- Elevation: 244 m (801 ft)

Population
  - Total: ~6,000

Languages
  - Official: Telugu
- Time zone: UTC+5:30 (IST)
- PIN: 524310
- Telephone code: +918620
- Vehicle registration: AP

Seetharamapuram is a village and a mandal in Nellore district in the state of Andhra Pradesh in India.

== Geography ==
Sitarampuram is located at an average elevation of 244 meters (803 feet).
