= Sydapuram =

- Village
- Interactive map of Sydapuram
- Location in Andhra Pradesh, India Sydapuram (India)
- Coordinates: 14°10′38″N 79°44′31″E
- Country: India
- State: Andhra Pradesh
- District: Nellore
- Mandal: Sydapuram
- Elevation: 23 m (75 ft)

Languages
  - Official: Telugu
- Time zone: UTC+5:30 (IST)
- Vehicle registration: AP

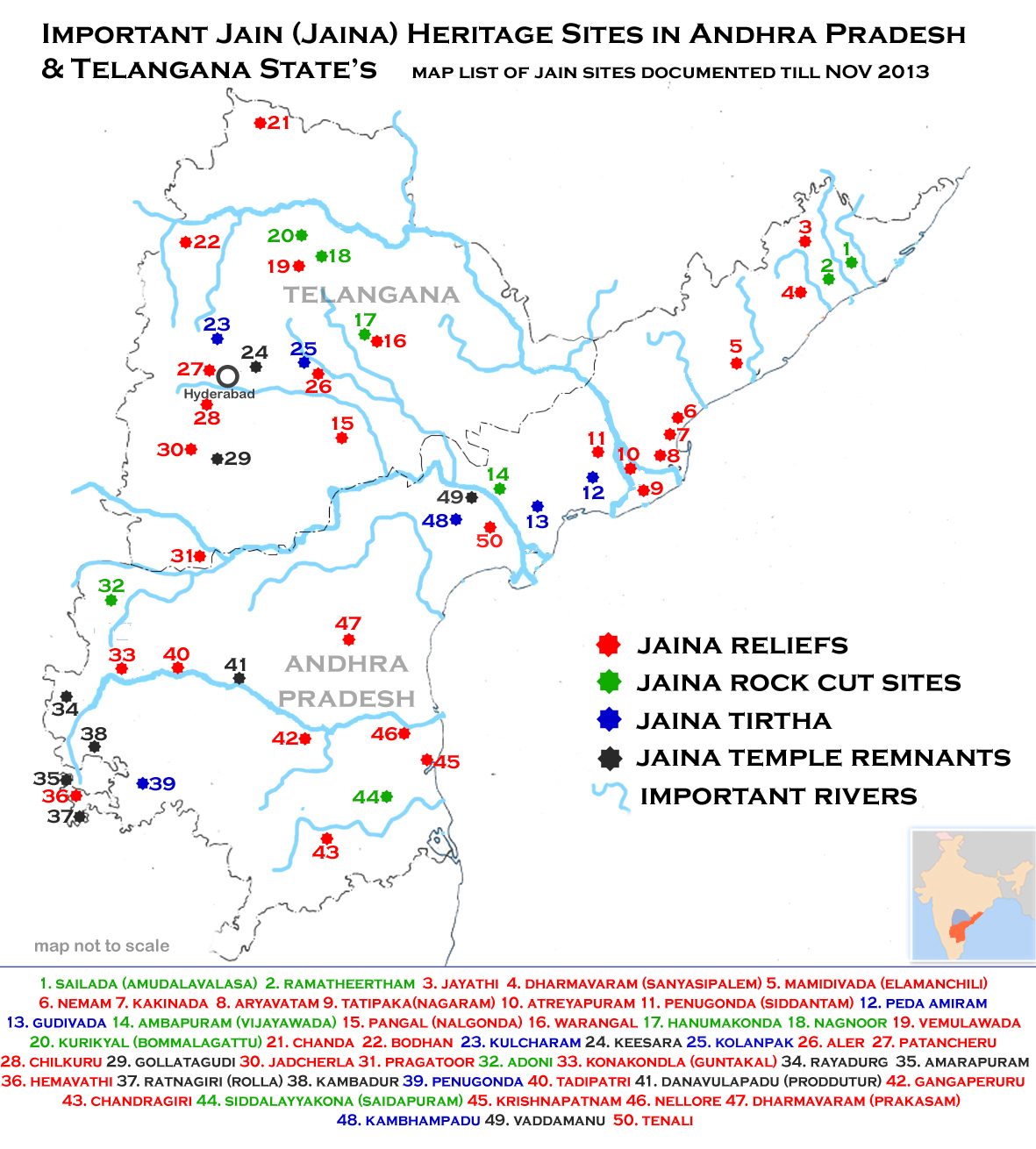
Siddalayya Konda near Sydapuram - Jain Heritage site(rock cut cave site)

Sydapuram or Saidapuram is a village and mandal headquarters of Sydapuram mandal located in Nellore district, Andhra Pradesh, India.

== Geography ==
Saidapuram is located at 14.1667°N 79.7333°E. It has an average elevation of 23 meters (78 feet).
