= Dagadarthi =

- Village
- Interactive map of Dagadarthi
- Location in Andhra Pradesh, India
- Country: India
- State: Andhra Pradesh
- District: Nellore
- Established: File:https://encrypted-tbn0.gstatic.com/images?q=tbn:ANd9GcSWbbHD2j6q-PujRAv8C2zOcH9cRmADiIcVjQ&s
- Talukas: Dagadarthi

Government
  - Type: mandal head quarter

Languages
  - Official: Telugu
- Time zone: UTC+5:30 (IST)
- Postal code: 524240
- Vehicle registration: AP

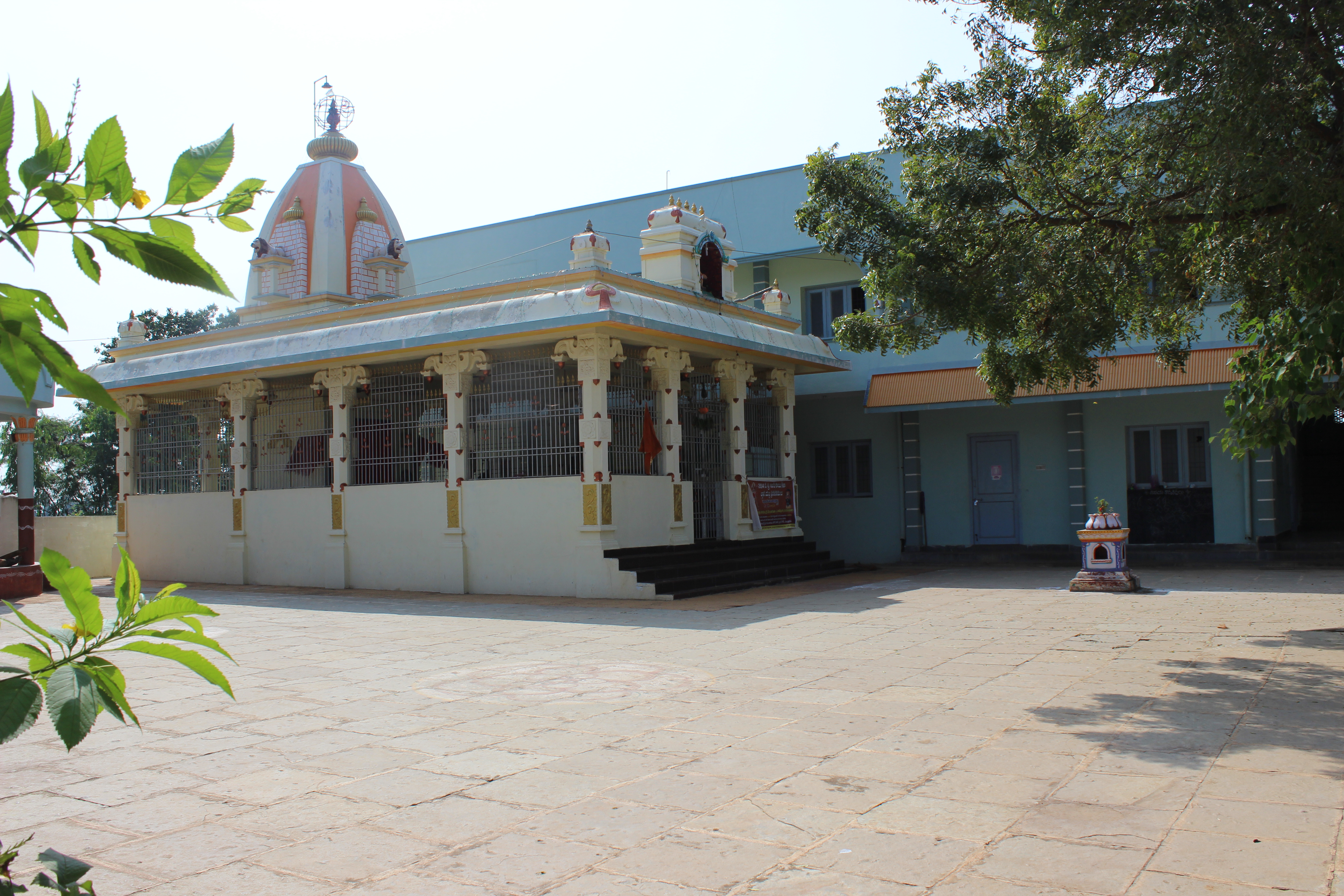
Dagadarthi Sai Baba Temple, Nellore district

Dagadarthi is a village and a Mandal in Nellore district in the state of Andhra Pradesh in India.

== Nellore Airport ==
The upcoming Nellore Airport which has a foundation stone laid by Sri Chandrababu Naidu is located near Dagadarthi. It will be ready by 2027.
