= Kondapuram mandal, Nellore district =

Kondapuram
- Mandal
- Interactive map of Kondapuram
- Location in Andhra Pradesh, India
- Coordinates: 14.99500°N 79.69292°E
- Country: India
- State: Andhra Pradesh
- District: Nellore

Languages
  - Official: Telugu
- Time zone: UTC+5:30 (IST)
- PIN: 524239
- Vehicle registration: AP

Kondapuram is a Tehsil or Mandal in the Nellore district of the Indian state of Andhra Pradesh.

== Demographics ==
According to 2011 census data, there is a population of 39,007 people of which 19,835 are male and 19,172 are female.

== Infrastructure ==
=== Schools ===
Good education up to 10th class in both Telugu and English medium is in reach across the villages in the Kondapuram tehsil. There are public residential schools in Kondapuram with separate hostels for boys and girls.

=== Travel ===
There is no public transportation to the Kondapuram via villages Gottigundala, Gottigundala Palem, Uppuluru, Chintaladeevi. But you can visit Kondapuram via Erraballi.

=== Mail services ===
Indian post office services are available to the last home in this Tehsil. The private courier services and online retailer services are available.

=== Banking and Government services ===
There are mini banking service providers and Mee seva centers in the villages of this Mandal. There are Gram Panchayats for each village which are chaired by Village Revenue Officer.

=== Water ===
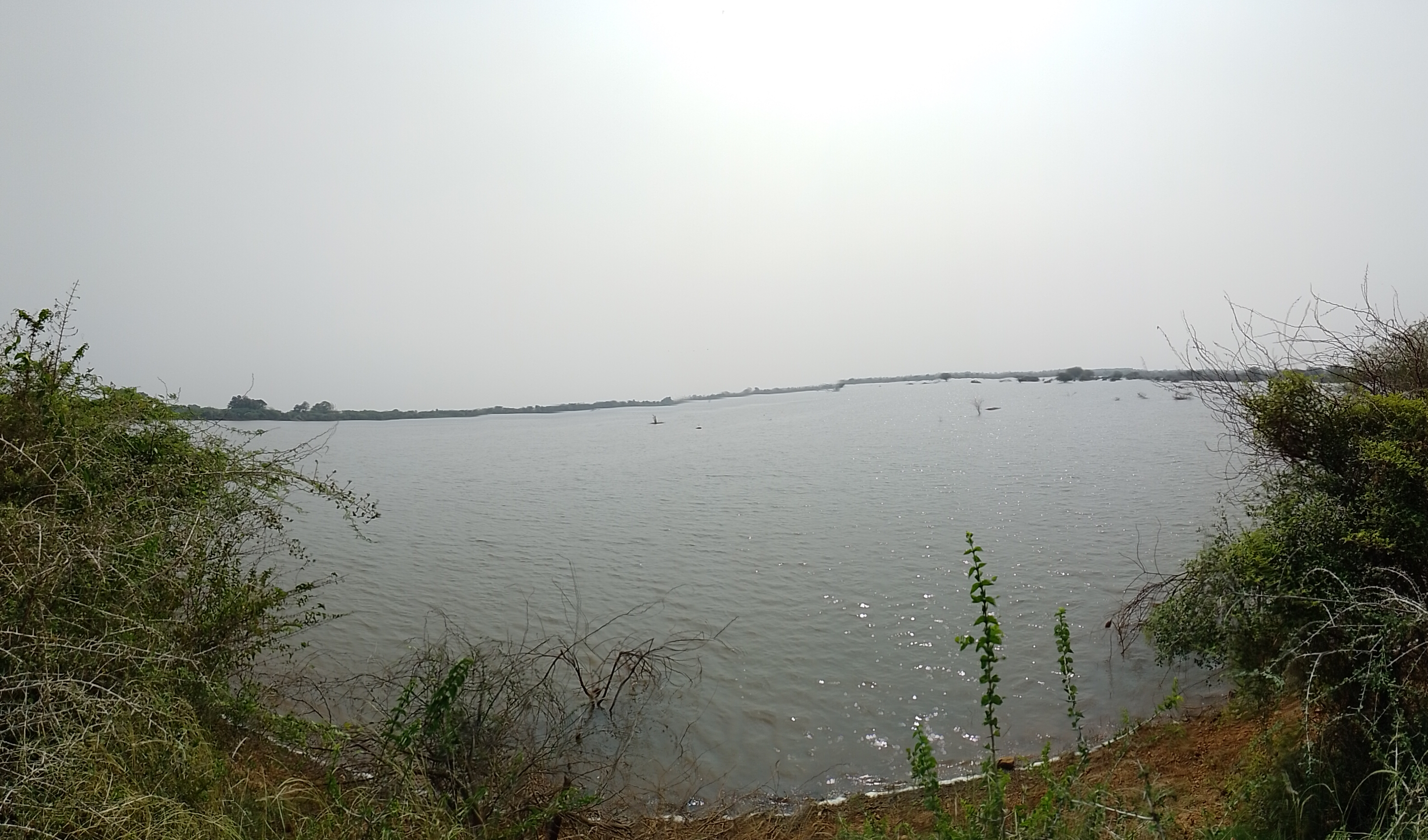
Gottigundala Pond

There is a well water supply system for the residents in most of the villages. Most of the people buy filtered water from the shops. In some villages, the public filtered water facility infrastructure is built, but the operations have not started yet.

There are water ponds, water gullies and water sheds.

== Villages ==
There are about 27 villages under Kondapuram Tehsil or Mandal.

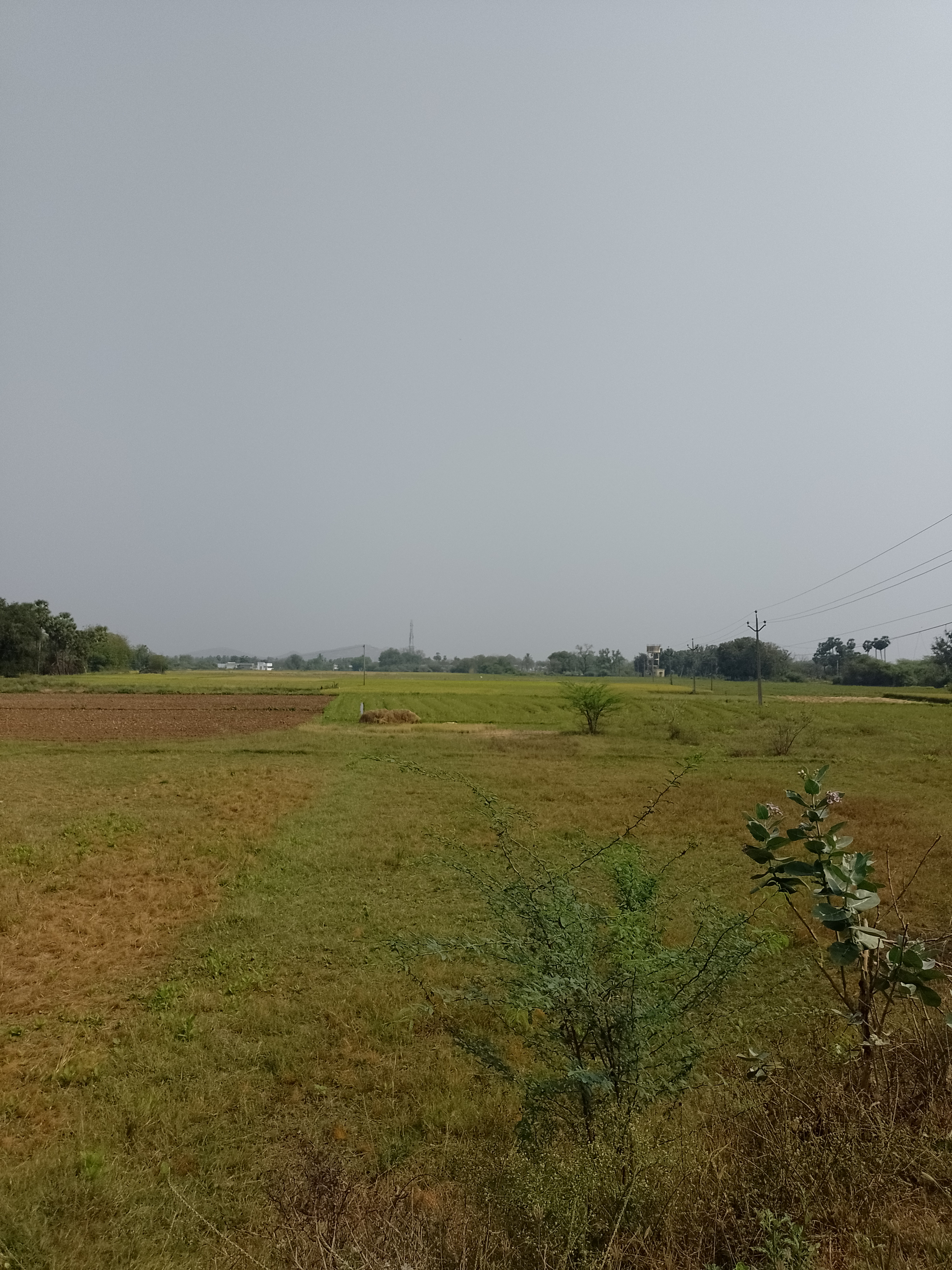
Crop fields in Gottigundala

#	Villages
1	Audimurthipuram
2	Bhimavarappadu
3	Challagirigala
4	Challavaripalli
5	Chinthaladevi
6	Ganugapenta
7	Garimenapenta
8	Gottigundala
9	Gudavalluru (Kondapuram)
10	Iskadamerla
11	Kasturinaidupalle
12	Kommi
13	Kumara Venkatapuram
14	Kunkuvaripalem
15	Mallavarappadu
16	Marrigunta
17	Nekunampeta
18	Parlapalle
19	Ramanujapuram
20	Saipeta
21	Satyavolu
22	Settipalem
23	Thurpu- Brahmanapalle
24	Thurpu- Jangalapalle
25	Thurpuyerraballe
26	Veligandla
27	Yerrabotlapalle

== Social Issues ==
There are child marriages happening still in this area. Due to logistics problem and the Kondapuram police station is far from the villages it is getting difficult to stop child marriages.

== Culture ==
Gottigundala village in this Tehsil is popular for the Kota Ankalamma Jatara (festival) and Poleramma Jatara celebrated every summer. People from across the district visit this festival. Animal sacrifices are offered in these festivals.
