= Yerradoddipalli =

- village
- Interactive map of Yerradoddipalli
- Location in Andhra Pradesh, India Yerradoddipalli (India)
- Coordinates: 13.7558°N 78.7981°E
- Country: India
- State: Andhra Pradesh
- District: Annamayya district

Population (2011)
  - Total: 532

Languages
  - Official: Telugu
- Time zone: UTC+5:30 (IST)

Yerradoddipalli, is a small village in Kalikiri mandal Annamayya district Andhra Pradesh state in India. It comes under Gundloor Panchayath.

== Etymology ==
It gets its name from the former zamindar of this area Yerradoddi Reddy Prasad.

== Geography and Climate ==
From 1981 to 2025, The monthly climatology (1981-2025) is given in the table below:

	Jan	Feb	Mar	Apr	May	Jun	Jul	Aug	Sept	Oct	Nov	Dec
Rain(mm)	7	6	13	32	76	79	95	115	142	137	84	36
Monthly Extreme High Average (C)	31.4	35.5	38.9	40.3	39.8	35.8	34.1	33.5	32.6	30.9	29.1	28.8
Mean Temperature (C)	20.9	23.5	27.0	29.4	29.3	26.5	25.6	25.2	24.7	23.6	21.8	20.4
Monthly Extreme Low Average (C)	12.6	13.5	15.8	19.3	21.5	20.4	20.0	19.8	19.1	17.1	14.1	12.5

== Schools ==
There is Mandal Praja Parishad school here.

== Places to See in Yerradoddi Palle ==
=== Guntenkonda ===
This is a small hill that is around 500 meters from the village. A good trekking can be undertaken at this hill.

=== Mahal Cheruvu ===
This is a small rivulet flowing through the village, due to draught conditions the rivulet does not flow strongly outside of a good rainy season.
