= Penchalakona =

Penchalakona 2nd Nava Narasimha Temple
- village
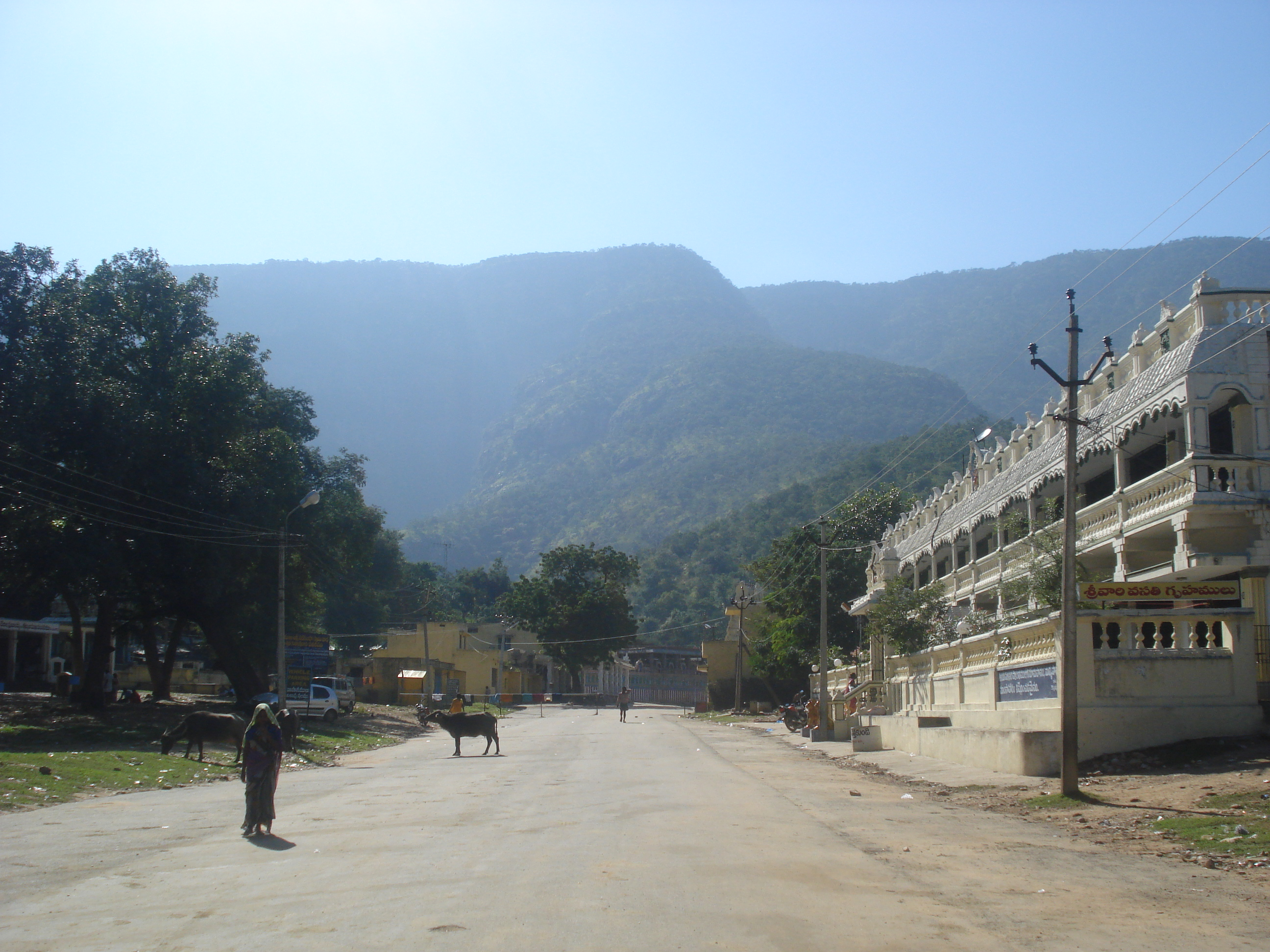
- Interactive map of Penchalakona
- Location in Andhra Pradesh, India
- Coordinates: 14.338904°N 79.412613°E
- Country: India
- State: Andhra Pradesh
- District: Nellore
- Named for: Temple

Government
  - Body: Sri Penusila Lakshmi Narasimhaswamy Vaari Devasthanam
- Elevation: 914.4 m (3,000 ft)

Languages
  - Official: Telugu
- Time zone: UTC+5:30 (IST)
- Postal code: 524414
- Vehicle registration: AP
- Nearest city: Nellore
- Nearest Airport: Renigunta International Airport
- Website: http://www.penchalakona.co.in/

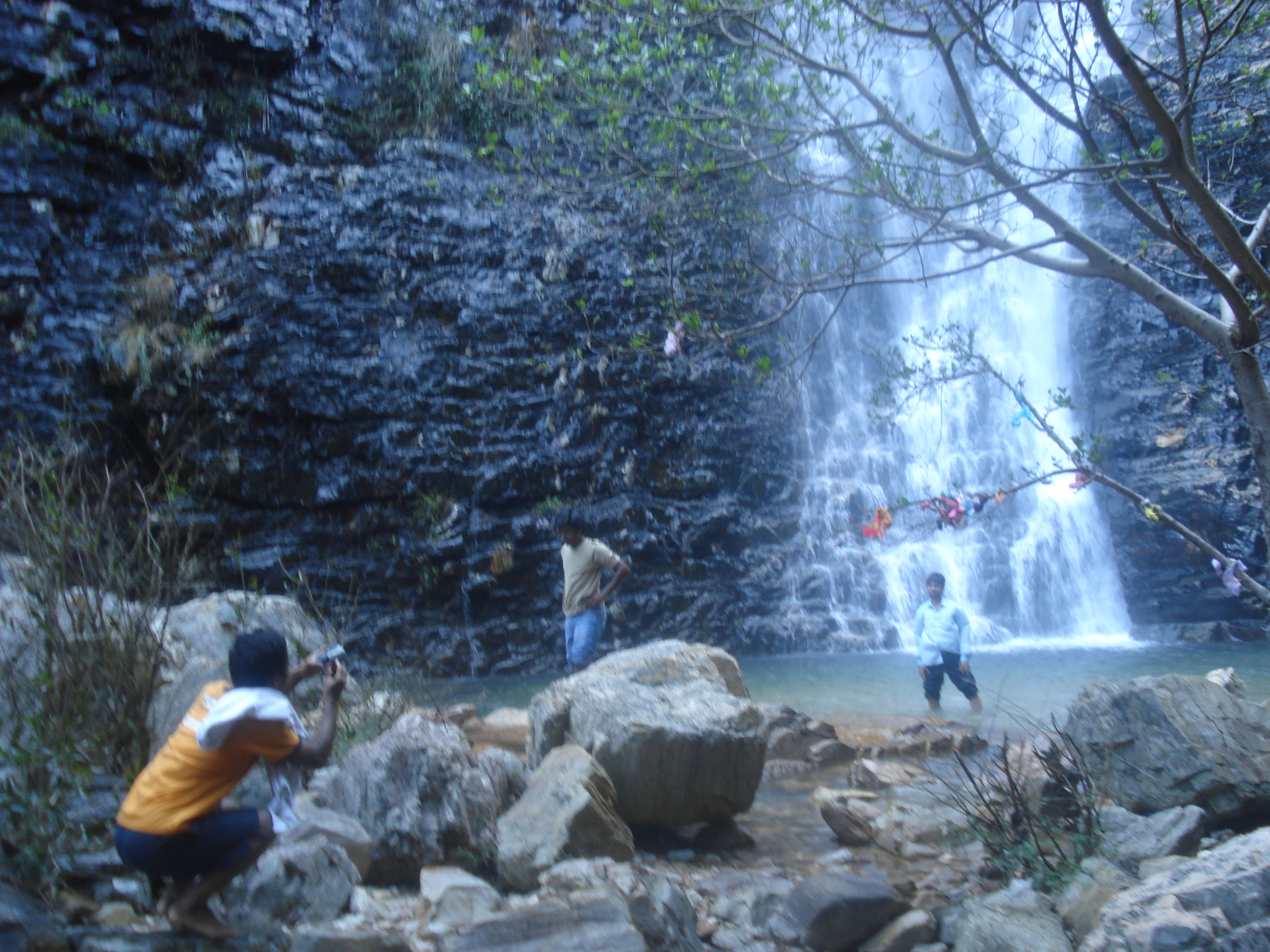
Penchalakona waterfalls

Penchalakona is a village located in the Rapur Mandal of Nellore district in Andhra Pradesh, India, 70 km west of Nellore.

== History and legend of the Temple ==
The Penusila Lakshmi Narasimha Swamy Temple is situated at the foot of a hill in the Penchalakona Valley. There is an image of the Lord, represented as a self-manifested one (Swayambhu). Two stones are entwined to form a lion's head upon a man's body. The "Sthalapurana", or ancient story, of the temple indicates that it was a famed for the swami "Thapovan of Kanvamaharshi" who performed penance there.

There is an annual festival at the temple, which is a major event in Penchalakona, celebrated during Vaisakha, the period of time in the Hindu solar calendar that begins in mid-April in Bengal, Nepal, and Punjab. It starts on the day of Suddha Dwadasi and lasts until Bahula Padyami, a total of five days. Devotees congregate for Narasimhaswamy Jayanthi to celebrate the occasion.
