= Anumasamudrampeta =

- Village
- Interactive map of Anumasamudrampeta
- Location in Andhra Pradesh, India Anumasamudrampeta (India)
- Coordinates: 14.7000°N 79.6833°E
- Country: India
- State: Andhra Pradesh
- Elevation: 49 m (161 ft)

Languages
  - Official: Telugu
- Time zone: UTC+5:30 (IST)
- Vehicle registration: AP

Anumasamudrampeta is a village in Nellore district of the state of Andhra Pradesh in India.
