= Varikuntapadu mandal =

Varikuntapadu
- Mandal
- Interactive map of Varikuntapadu
- Location in Andhra Pradesh, India Varikuntapadu (India)
- Coordinates: 14.9833°N 79.4167°E
- Country: India
- State: Andhra Pradesh
- District: Nellore
- Elevation: 112 m (367 ft)

Languages
  - Official: Telugu
- Time zone: UTC+5:30 (IST)

Varikuntapadu mandal is a Mandal in Nellore district in the state of Andhra Pradesh in India. It is headquartered in Varikuntapadu which is a village on the state road from Pamuru to Nellore.

== Geography ==
Varikuntapadu is located at 14.9833°N 79.4167°E. It has an average elevation of 112 meters (370 feet).

== Demographics ==
As of 2011 the town had a population of 2,707. The Varikuntapadu Mandal had a population of 36,828.

These are the villages of Varikuntapadu Mandal:

- Alivelumangapuram
- Bhaskarapuram
- Dakkanur
- Damancherla
- Ganeswarapuram
- Gollapalle
- Guvvadi
- Iskapalli
- Jadadevi
- Kancheruvu
- Kaniampadu
- Kondayapalem
- Mohammadapuram
- Narasimhapuram
- Pamurupalle
- Peddireddipalle
- Ramadevulapadu
- Thodugupalle
- Thotalacheruvupalle
- Thurpu Boyamadugula
- Thurpu Chennampalle
- Thurpupalem
- Turpurompidodla
- Vempadu
- Viruvooru
- Yerramreddipalle
