= Manubolu =

- Village
- Interactive map of Manubolu
- Location in Andhra Pradesh, India Manubolu (India)
- Coordinates: 14.1833°N 79.8833°E
- Country: India
- State: Andhra Pradesh
- Elevation: 9 m (30 ft)

Languages
  - Official: Telugu
- Time zone: UTC+5:30 (IST)
- Vehicle registration: AP

Manubolu is a village and a Mandal in Nellore district in the state of Andhra Pradesh in India.

== Geography ==
Manubolu is located at 14.1833°N 79.8833°E. It has an average elevation of 9 meters (32 feet).
