= Balayapalle =

Coordinates: 14°04′31″N 79°41′16″E

- Village
- Interactive map of Balayapalle
- Location in Andhra Pradesh, India
- Country: India
- State: Andhra Pradesh
- District: Tirupati
- Talukas: Balayapalle

Languages
  - Official: Telugu
- Time zone: UTC+5:30 (IST)
- PIN: 524404
- Telephone code: 08625
- Vehicle registration: AP

Balayapalle is a village and a Mandal in Tirupati district in the state of Andhra Pradesh in India.
