= Nellore rural mandal =

- Mandal
- Interactive map of Nellore rural mandal
- Location in Andhra Pradesh, India
- Coordinates: 14.442599°N 79.986456°E
- Country: India
- State: Andhra Pradesh
- District: Nellore
- Headquarters: Nellore

Languages
  - Official: Telugu
- Time zone: UTC+5:30 (IST)

Nellore rural mandal is one of the 46 mandals in Nellore district of the state of Andhra Pradesh, India. Its headquarters are located at Nellore. It is formed by dividing Nellore mandal into Nellore urban and Nellore rural mandals as part of districts reorganisation on 4 April 2022.

== Towns and villages ==
Gudipallipadu is the most populated village and Mattempadu is the least populated settlement in the mandal. As of 2011 census, the mandal has 34 settlements, that includes:

1. Akkacheruvupadu
2. Allipuram (rural)
3. Amancherla
4. Ambapuram
5. Chintareddipalem
6. Devarapalem
7. Donthali
8. Golla Kandukur
9. Gudipallipadu
10. Gundlapalem
11. Kakupalle-I
12. Kakupalle-II (Madaraja Gudur)
13. Kallurpalle (rural)
14. Kandamur
15. Kanuparthipadu
16. Mannavarappadu
17. Mattempadu
18. Mogallapalem
19. Mulumudi
20. Ogurupadu
21. Pedda Cherukur
22. Penubarthi
23. Pottepalem
24. Sajjapuram
25. South Mopur
26. Upputuru
27. Vellanti
28. Visavaviletipadu

Sources:

- Census India 2011 (sub districts)
- Revenue Department of AP
