= Jaladanki =

- Village
- Interactive map of Jaladanki
- Location in Andhra Pradesh, India
- Coordinates: 14°54′N 79°54′E
- Country: India
- State: Andhra Pradesh
- District: Nellore

Area
  - Total: 55.56 km^{2} (21.45 sq mi)

Population (2011)
  - Total: 10,088
  - Density: 181.6/km^{2} (470.3/sq mi)

Languages
  - Official: Telugu
- Time zone: UTC+5:30 (IST)
- PIN: 524223

Jaladanki is a village in Nellore district of the Indian state of Andhra Pradesh. It is located in Jaladanki mandal of Kavali revenue division.

== Demographics ==
According to Census 2011 information the location code or village code of Jaladanki village is 591700. Jaladanki village is located in Jaladanki mandal of Sri Potti Sriramulu Nellore district in Andhra Pradesh, India. It is situated 65km away from district headquarter Jaladanki. Jaladanki is the sub-district headquarter of Jaladanki village. As per 2009 stats, L R Agraharam is the gram panchayat of Jaladanki village.

The total geographical area of village is 5556 hectares. Jaladanki has a total population of 10,088 peoples, out of which male population is 5,124 while female population is 4,964. Literacy rate of jaladanki village is 52.64% out of which 60.17% males and 44.86% females are literate. There are about 2,687 houses in jaladanki village. Pincode of jaladanki village locality is 524223.
