= Venkatachalam mandal =

Venkatachalam
- Mandal
- Interactive Map Outlining mandal
- Location in Andhra Pradesh, India Venkatachalam (India)
- Coordinates: 14.3167°N 79.9167°E
- Country: India
- State: Andhra Pradesh
- District: Nellore district

Area
  - Total: 295.64 km^{2} (114.15 sq mi)
- Elevation: 20 m (66 ft)

Population (2011)
  - Total: 61,275
  - Density: 207.26/km^{2} (536.81/sq mi)

Languages
  - Official: Telugu
- Time zone: UTC+5:30 (IST)
- Vehicle registration: AP

Venkatachalam is one of the mandal in Nellore district of the Indian state of Andhra Pradesh.

== Geography ==
Venkatachellam is located at 14.3167°N 79.9167°E. It has an average elevation of 20 meters (68 feet).
