= Chejerla, Nellore district =

Chejerla
- Village
- Interactive map of Chejerla
- Location in Andhra Pradesh, India Chejerla (India)
- Coordinates: 14.5167°N 79.5667°E
- Country: India
- State: Andhra Pradesh
- Elevation: 48 m (157 ft)

Languages
  - Official: Telugu
- Time zone: UTC+5:30 (IST)
- Vehicle registration: AP

Chejerla is a village and a Mandal in Nellore district in the state of Andhra Pradesh in India.

== Demographics ==
As of 2001 India census, Chejerla had a population of 6172. Males constitute 52% of the population and females 48%. Chejerla has an average literacy rate of 65.89%, less than the Andhra pradesh average of 67.02%: male literacy is 74%, and female literacy is 57%.

== Geography ==
Chejerla is located at 14.5167°N 79.5667°E. It has an average elevation of 48 meters (160 feet).
