= Podalakur =

- Village and Mandal
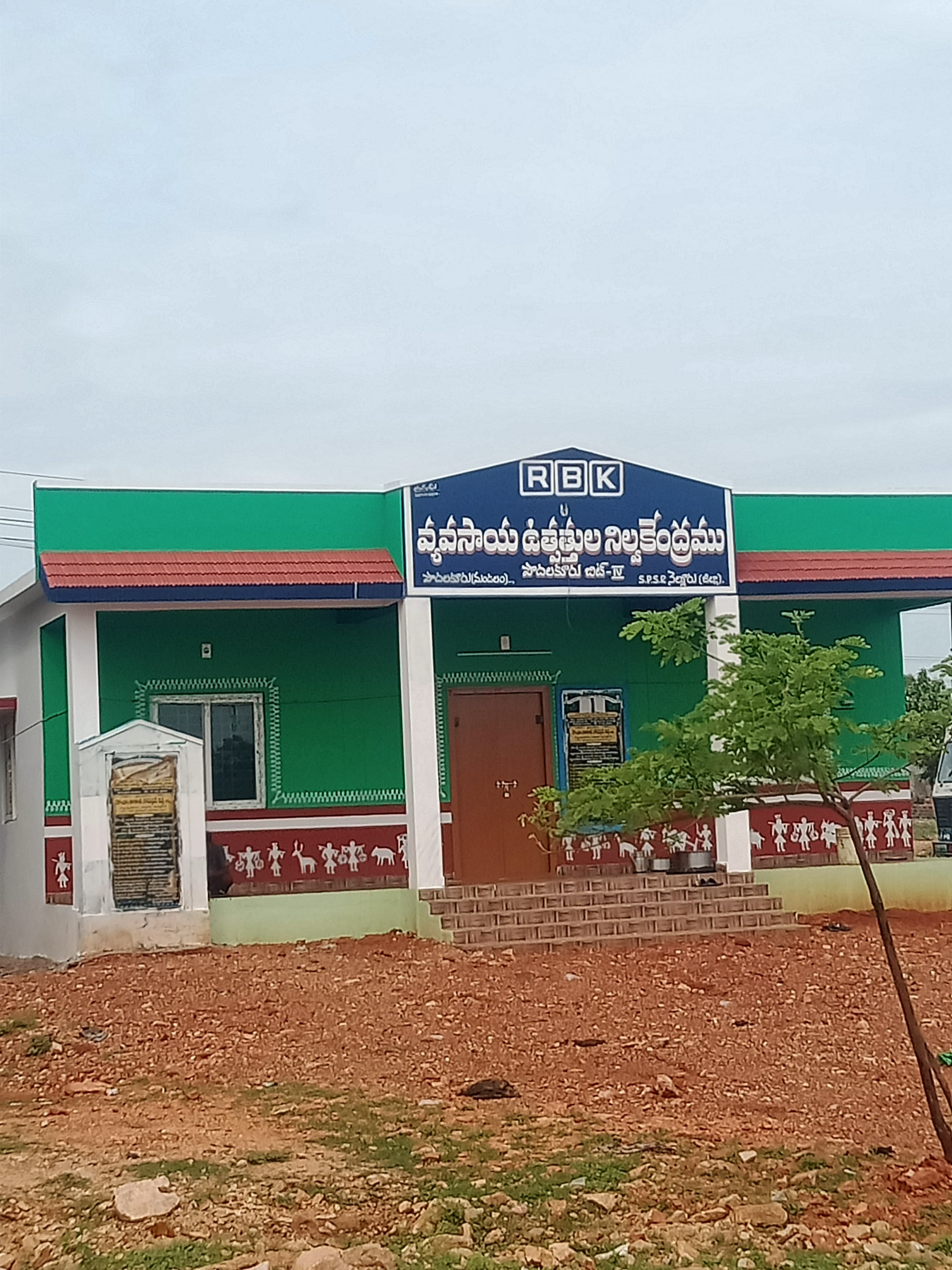
- Interactive map of Podalakur
- Location in Andhra Pradesh, India
- Coordinates: 14.3667°N 79.7333°E
- Country: India
- State: Andhra Pradesh
- District: Nellore
- Elevation: 43 m (141 ft)

Population
  - Total: 20,000

Languages
  - Official: Telugu
- Time zone: UTC+5:30 (IST)
- PIN: 524345
- Vehicle registration: AP

Podalakur is a village and mandal in Nellore district of the Indian state of Andhra Pradesh, India.

== Geography ==
Podalakur is located at 14.3667°N 79.7333°E. It has an average elevation of 43 metres (141 feet). The nearest railway station is at Vedayapalam, located at a distance of about 25 km.

== Transport ==
Podalakur has a bus stand providing local bus services. The nearest APSRTC bus depot is located at Rapur.
