= Sangam, Nellore district =

Coordinates: 14°35′44″N 79°44′34″E

Sangam
- Village
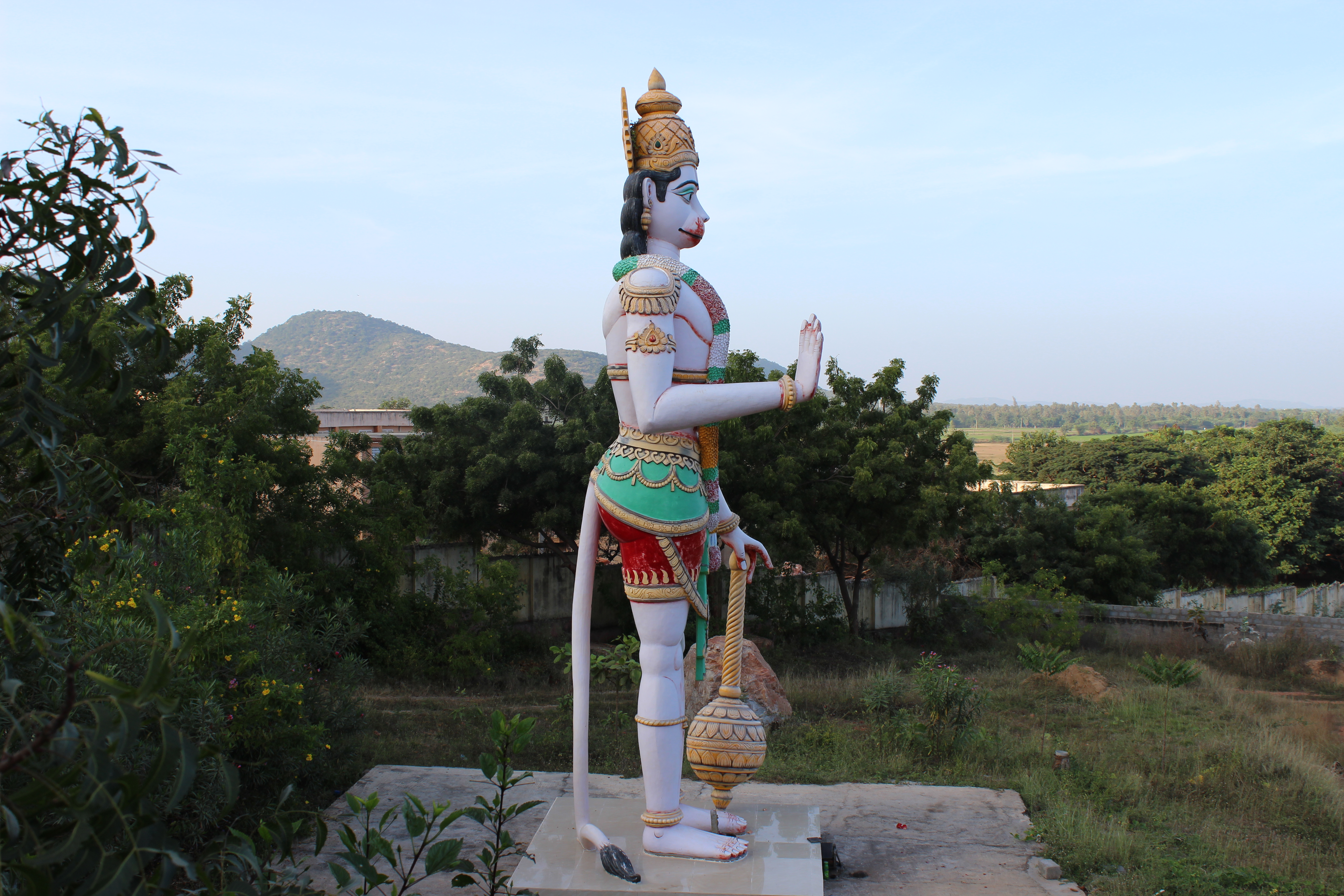
- Interactive map of Sangam
- Country: India
- State: Andhra Pradesh
- District: Nellore
- Talukas: Sangam

Languages
  - Official: Telugu
- Time zone: UTC+5:30 (IST)

Sangam is a village on the bank of Penna River and a Mandal in Nellore district in the state of Andhra Pradesh in India. The village of penna rever is nearby to the north.Sangam is a village located in Nellore district of the Indian state of Andhra Pradesh.

During annual Brahmotsavams, Seshavahanam ritual has been performed for over 120 years by the Shakhavarapu family tradition.
