= Gudur =

Gudur Guduru
- Town
- Location in Andhra Pradesh, India
- Coordinates: 14.14733°N 79.84771°E
- Country: India
- State: Andhra Pradesh
- District: Nellore
- Revenue division: Gudur

Government
  - Type: Municipality
  - Body: Gudur Municipality

Area
  - Total: 57.48 km^{2} (22.19 sq mi)

Population (2011)
  - Total: 74,037
  - Density: 1,288/km^{2} (3,336/sq mi)

Languages
  - Official: Telugu
- Time zone: UTC+5:30 (IST)
- PIN: 524 101
- Telephone code: +91–8624
- Vehicle registration: AP–39
- Sex ratio: 1:1(approx) ♂/♀
- Website: Gudur Municipality

Gudur, natively known as Guduru, is a town in Nellore district of the Indian state of Andhra Pradesh. It is a municipality and the headquarters of Gudur mandal and Gudur revenue division; the distance from Nellore is 45 km.

== Demographics ==
As of the 2011 census of India, the town had a population of 73,350. The total population consisted of 36,078 males, 37,272 females and 7,095 children, in the age group of 0–6 years. The average literacy rate stood at 71.07% with 52,134 literates.

== Geography ==
Climate

The climate is tropical. The summers have a good deal of rainfall, while the winters have very little. This location is classified as Aw by Köppen and Geiger. In Gudur, the average annual temperature is 29.2 °C. About 1025 mm of precipitation falls annually.

== Governance ==
Civic administration

The municipality was established in the year 1954. Its jurisdictional area covers 9.14 km^{2} (3.53 mi^{2}). The urban agglomeration of the town consists of Gudur municipality and its out growths. The out growths include Guduru (east), Guduru (west), Chennuru–II, Nellatur, Chillakur.

Politics

Gudur is a part of Gudur (SC) (Assembly constituency) for Andhra Pradesh Legislative Assembly. The current MLA name is Pasim Sunil Kumar from TDP.

== Transport ==
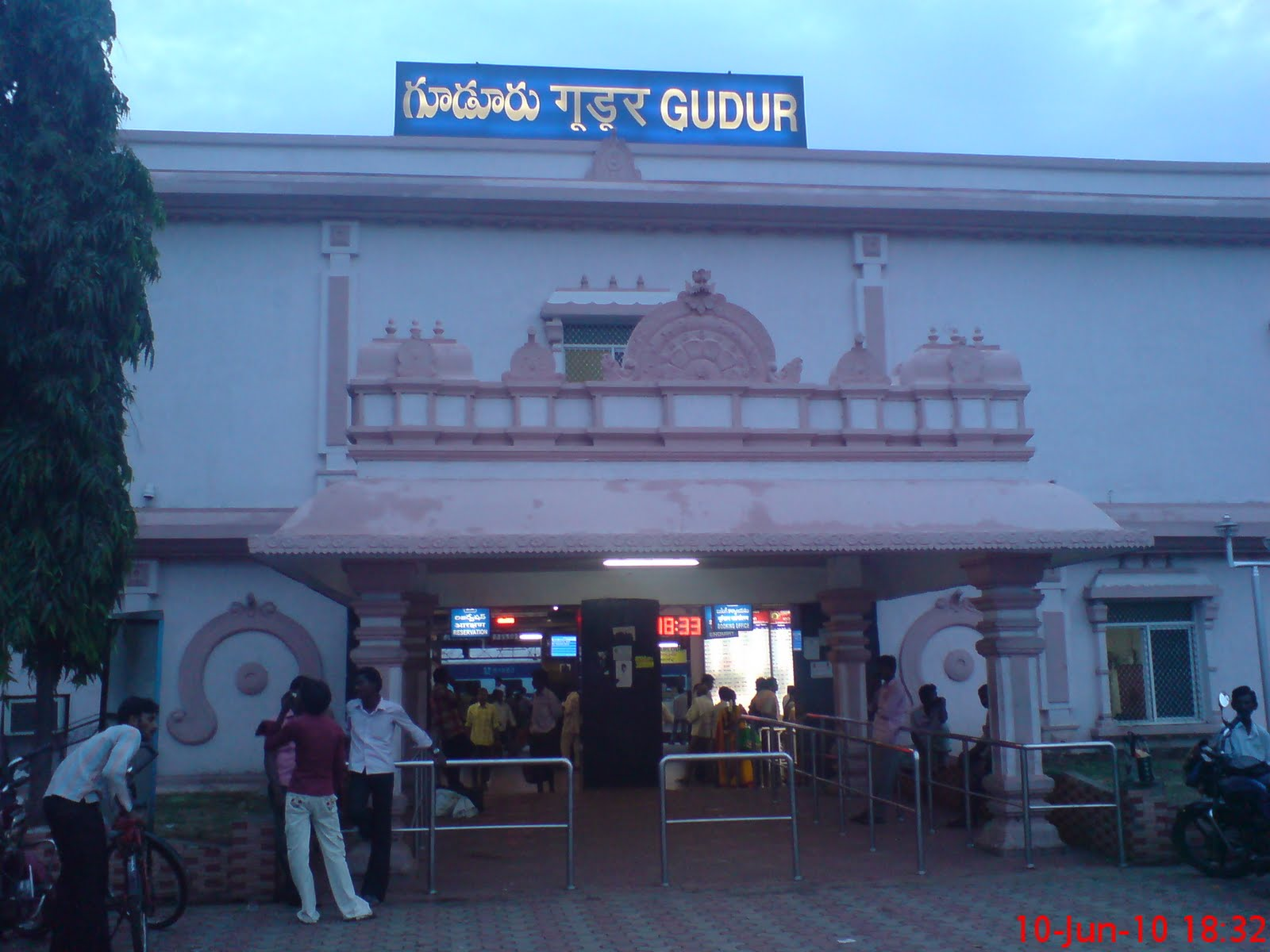
Gudur Junction railway station

National Highway 16 passes through the town, which connects Kolkata and Chennai. The Andhra Pradesh State Road Transport Corporation operates bus services from Gudur bus station as it has a bus depot in gudur with code GDR. Gudur Junction is a major railway junction, which connects Howrah-Chennai main line and Renigunta branch line. It is classified as an A–category station and recognised as an Adarsh station in the Vijayawada railway division of South Central Railway zone.

== Education ==
The primary and secondary school education is imparted by government, aided and private schools, under the School Education Department of the state. The medium of instruction followed by different schools are Telugu, Urdu, Hindi and English. Gudur also has a number of degree and engineering colleges.

== Business ==
=== Gudur Lemon Market ===
Lemon business is the most unbeaten business in Gudur. Gudur's lemon market is one of the largest lemon markets in Andhra Pradesh. The lemon market is located at Gudur town on the way of Chennur. Gudur and the surrounding villages' farmers mostly prefer to farm lemon trees. They export lemons around the country and also to other countries. Usually lemon is sold in two prominent methods in Gudur, i.e. Pieces and Bundles (contains more than 1000 lb). Pricing is based on the season and demand and varies every day.

=== Mica ===
Mica mining is a prominent business in Gudur.

The mica belts around Gudur are the second largest in India, covering nearly 1000 km^{2}. The types found are quartz, feldspar, muscovite and vermiculite.

One of the first firms to start mica trading at a large scale was Laxmi Mica Industries – Gudur under the leadership of the late Sri Lal Khatuwala. The largest deposit of mica in India was at Koderma, Jharkhand, and the second largest is at Gudur. At a time when there were 19 mica mines, Laxmi Mica Industries had a contract to purchase outright all the stocks from 18 mines. The two firms Birdhichand Bansidhar and Laxmi Mica Industries are the top mica exporters of India.

Some of the other mica firms were: Micamin Exports - Gudur Premier Mica Company - Gudur Microfine Mica Company - Gudur Micafab - Gudur Krishna Mica Company - Gudur Yashoda Krishna Mica Mining Co. - Gudur Venkatagiri Raja Mining Co. - Gudur KHR Mica company - Gudur

=== Aquaculture ===
Aquaculture is another successful business in Gudur, with many prawn ponds in the area. Usually there are two main types of prawn farmed, scampi and tiger prawns. The water and weather in this area are suitable to mainly these two types. The prawns are sold around India and also exported.

== Notable people ==
- Balli Kalyanachakravarthy (born 1984), member of the Andhra Pradesh Legislative Council
