= Chillakur =

- Out Growth/Village
- Interactive map of Chillakur
- Location in Andhra Pradesh, India
- Coordinates: 14.1333°N 79.8667°E
- Country: India
- State: Andhra Pradesh
- District: Nellore

Languages
  - Official: Telugu
- Time zone: UTC+5:30 (IST)
- Postal code: 524412
- Vehicle registration: AP

Chillakur is a village and partly out growth of Gudur in Nellore district of the Indian state of Andhra Pradesh. It is located in Gudur revenue division.

== Geography ==
Chillakur is located at 14.1333°N 79.8667°E. It has an average elevation of 14 meters (49 feet).
