= Nellore district =

- District of Andhra Pradesh
- Sri Potti Sriramulu Nellore district
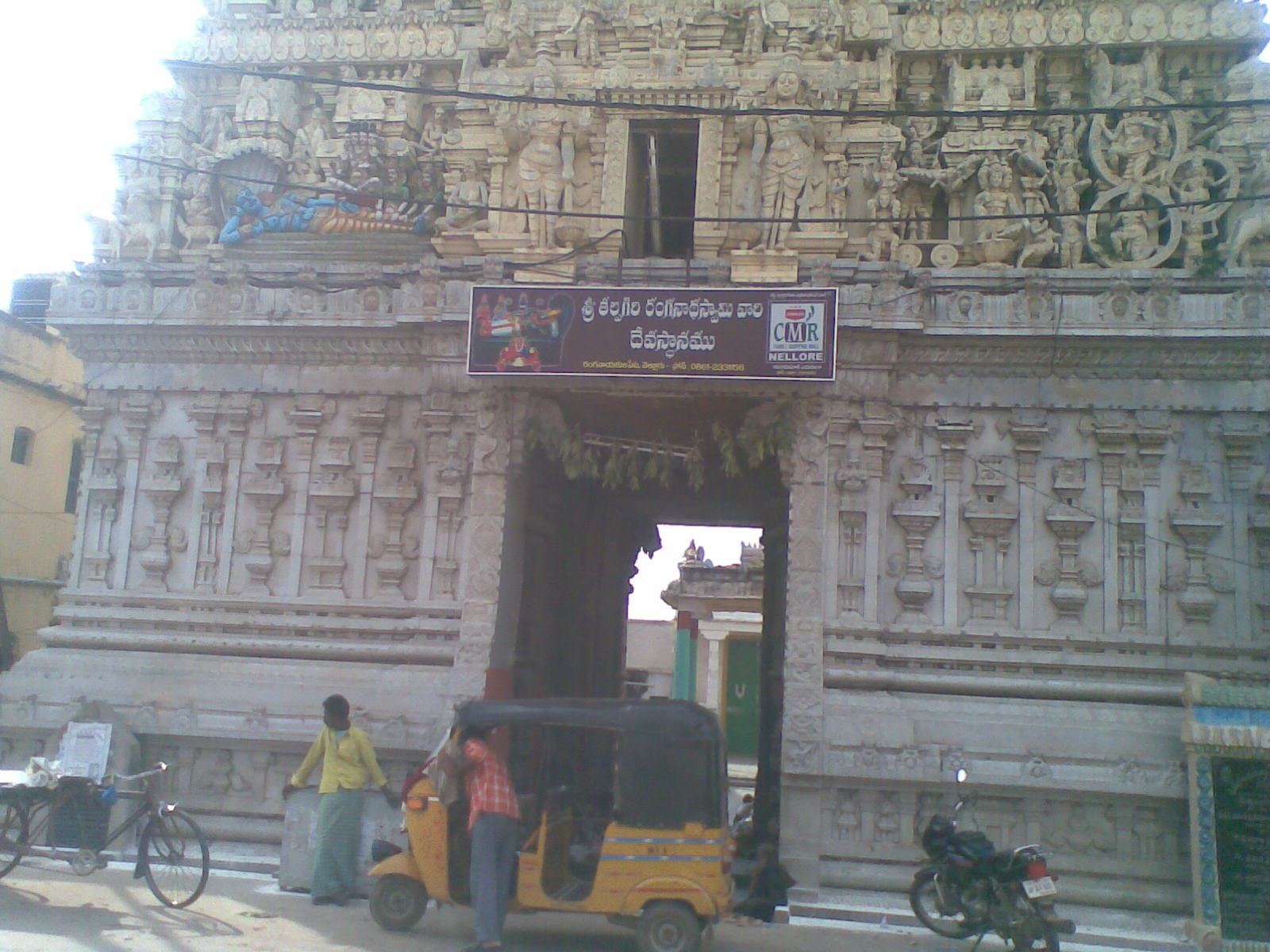
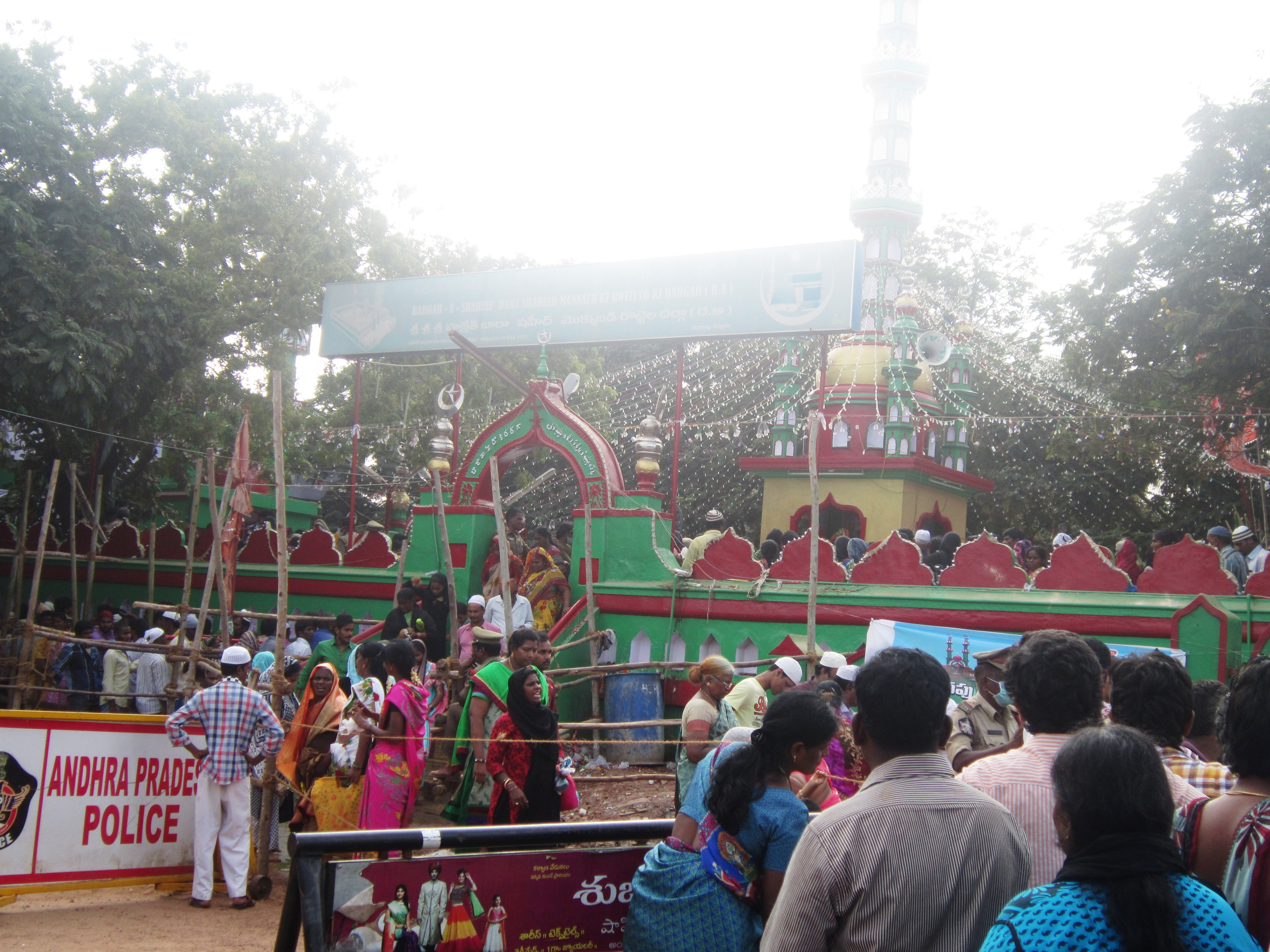
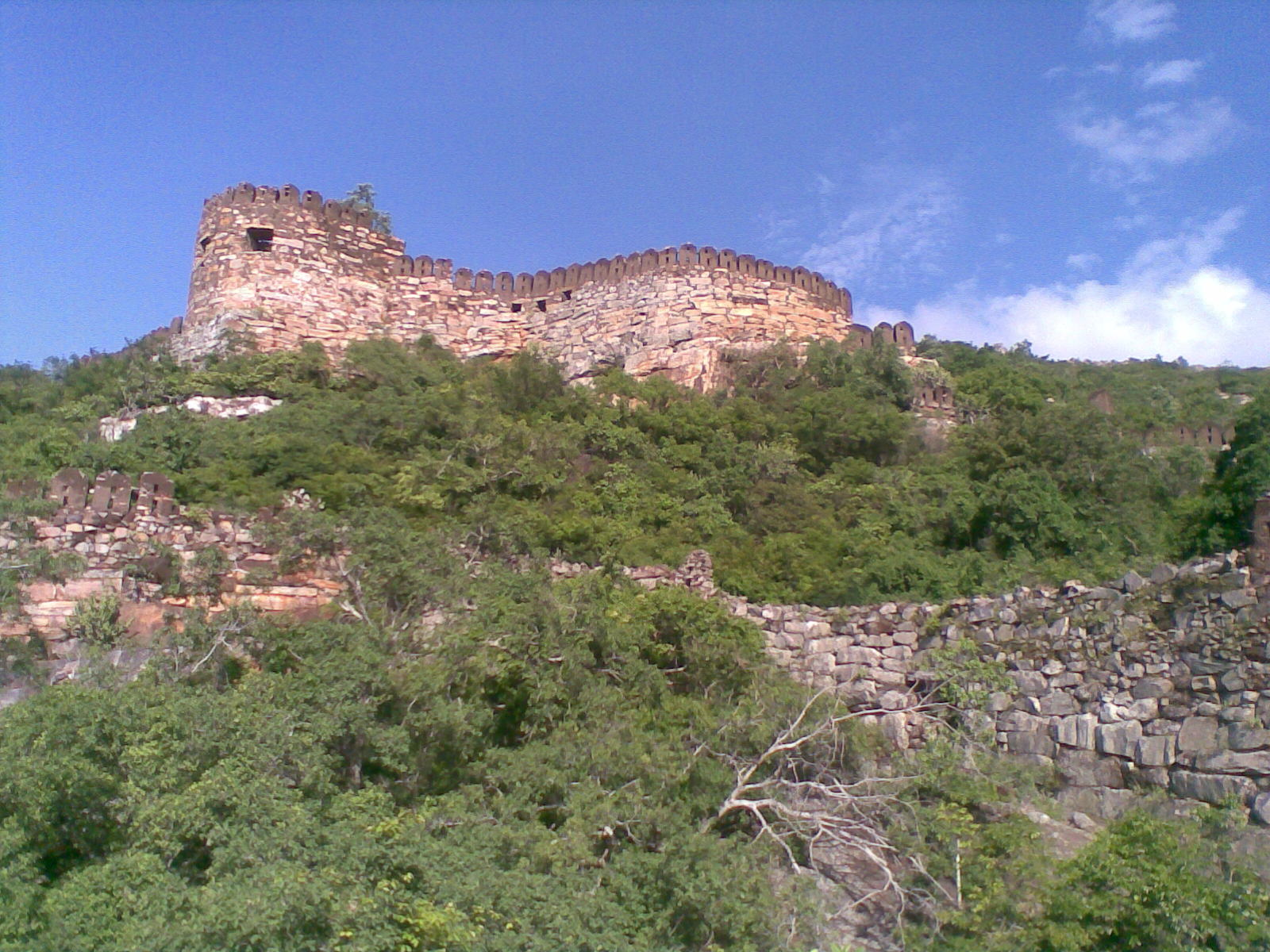
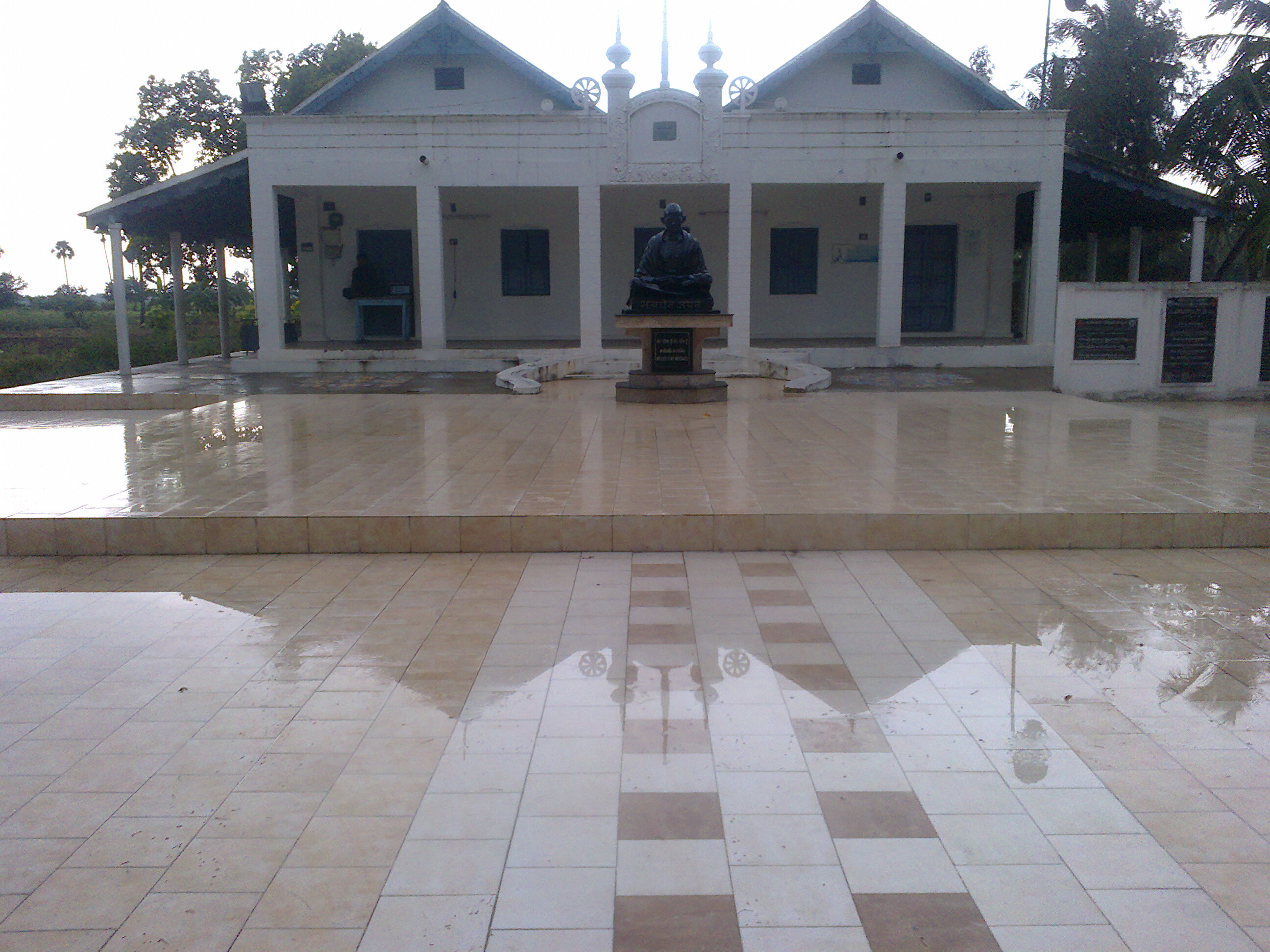
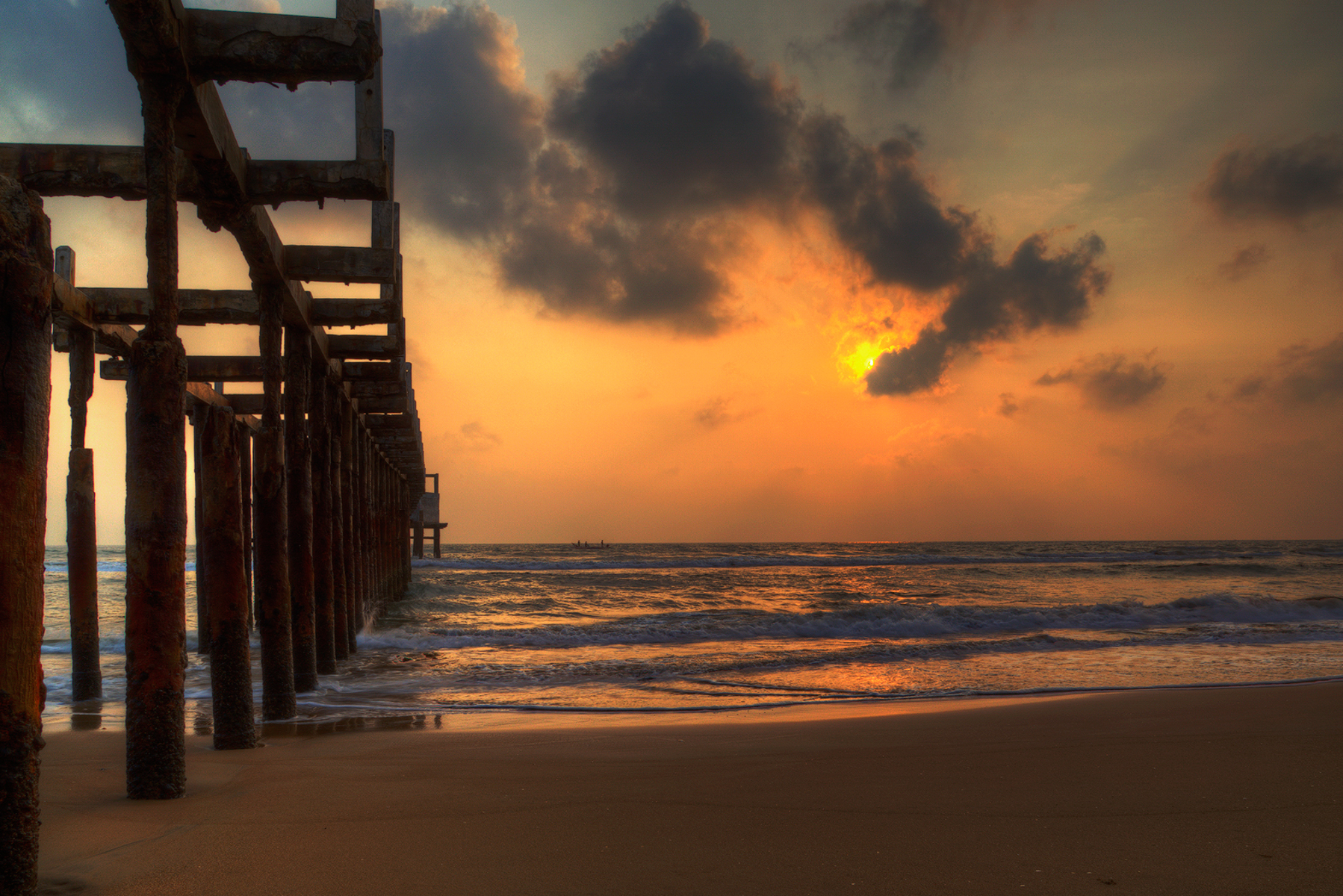
- Clockwise from top-left: Ranganathaswamy Temple at Nellore, Bara Shaheed Dargah, Pinakini Satygraha Ashramam, Mypadu Beach, Udayagiri Fort

- Location of Sri Potti Sriramulu Nellore district in Andhra Pradesh
- Interactive map of Nellore district
- Coordinates (Nellore): 14°26′N 80°0′E
- Country: India
- State: Andhra Pradesh
- Region: Coastal Andhra
- Established: 1792
- 1st Reorganized: 1970 (Prakasam district)
- 2nd Reorganized: 2022 (Tirupati district)
- Named for: Potti Sreeramulu
- Headquarters: Nellore
- Mandals: 36

Government
  - District collector: Himanshu Shukla, I.A.S.
  - Lok Sabha constituencies: Nellore
  - MP: Vemireddy Prabhakar Reddy
  - Assembly constituencies: 08

Area
  - Total: 10,447 km^{2} (4,034 sq mi)

Population (2011)
  - Total: 2,469,712
  - Density: 236.40/km^{2} (612.28/sq mi)
  - Urban: 29.07%

Demographics
  - Literacy: 69.15%
  - Sex ratio: 986
- Time zone: UTC+5:30 (IST)
- Vehicle registration: AP-26 (former); AP–39 (from 30 January 2019)
- Major highways: NH 16, NH 67, NH 565
- Coastline: 167 kilometres (104 mi)
- District LGD code: 515
- District abbreviation: NEL
- Website: spsnellore.ap.gov.in

Nellore district, officially known as Sri Potti Sriramulu Nellore district in Coastal Andhra Region, is one of the 28 districts in the Indian state of Andhra Pradesh. According to the 2011 Census, the district's population was 2,963,557 of which 29.07% was urban. Its administrative headquarters are located in Nellore city. Located in the Coastal Andhra region, the district is bordered by the Bay of Bengal to the east, Kadapa district to the west, Prakasam district and Markapuram district to the north, and Tirupati district to the south.

== Etymology ==
The name of the district is derived from the name of the district headquarters, Nellore. The city was historically known as Vikrama Simhapuri until the 13th century, when it became known as Nellore. The name "Nellore" originates from a mythological story in the Sthala Purana, which depicts a lingam in the form of a stone under a Phyllanthus emblica (amla), or nelli tree. According to this myth, the place gradually became known as "Nelli-ooru" (nelli referring to the amla tree and ooru meaning "place" in both Tamil and Telugu). Over time, the name evolved to the present-day "Nellore," reflecting the area's historical and cultural significance. The name is also linked to the Tamil word "நெல்லு" (nellu), meaning "paddy" or "rice," highlighting the region's long-standing association with rice cultivation.

The official name of Nellore was changed to Sri Potti Sriramulu Nellore District (SPS Nellore) on 4 June 2008, in honour of the Indian revolutionary Potti Sri Ramulu, who died fasting in an attempt to achieve the formation of a separate state for the Telugu people, which would later become Andhra Pradesh.

== History ==
=== The Nawabs and the British period ===
After the fall of the Vijayanagara Empire, the area was ruled by the Nawabs. During the eighteenth century, Nellore saw wars between Najeebullah, the ruler of the area, and his brother Arcot Nawab, who received support from the British and French. Nawab's army, under the command of colonel Caillaud, took over the Nellore fort in 1762. For the purposes of revenue collection, the town of Nellore and the surrounding district were handed over to the British East India Company in 1781 and 1801, respectively. Nellore was named the revenue unit for the district.

=== Post Indian Independence ===
In 1970, the northern parts of Nellore district were transferred to the newly created Prakasam district.

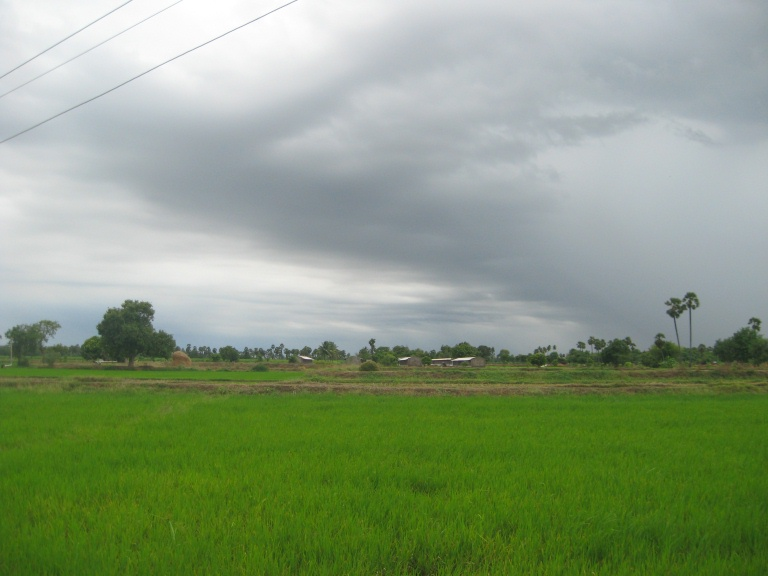
Damaramadugu rice fields in Nellore district

On 4 April 2022 Some areas from Southern parts of Nellore district were transferred to newly created Tirupati district.

=== Education ===
In the undivided Nellore district, as per the school information report for the academic year 2017–18, there are a total of 4,489 schools. These include: 21 government, 3,140 mandal and zilla parishads, 2 residential, 1,077 private, 10 model, 10 Kasturba Gandhi Balika Vidyalaya (KGBV), 106 municipal and 123 other types of schools. The total number of students enrolled in primary, upper primary and high schools of the district are 3,95,092.

=== Economy ===
The Gross District Domestic Product (GDDP) of Nellore district is ₹30,482 crore (304.82 billion rupees) and makes up 5.8% of Andhra Pradesh's Gross State Domestic Product (GSDP). For the fiscal year 2013–14, Nellore's per capita income at current prices was ₹80,782 (US$860). The primary, secondary and tertiary sectors of the district contribute ₹9,729 crore, ₹6,320 crore and ₹14,433 crore (97.29 billion, 63.2 billion and 144.33 billion rupees), respectively. The major agricultural contributors to the district's gross value added (GVA) include: paddy, sugarcane, lemon, tomato, milk, meat and fisheries. The major industrial and service contributors to the district's GVA include: construction, electricity, manufacturing, transport and education.

=== Mining ===
Nellore district produces most of the crude mica in India. Between 2011 and 2012, Nellore produced 1,784 tonnes of crude mica, the majority of India's total production of 1,899 tonnes.

== Epigraphical records ==
In Nellore district, there exist a variety of Telugu inscriptions originating from several different kingdoms. Tamil inscriptions also exist near the Mallam Subramanyeshwara Swamy temple, which was constructed by Rajendhra Chola during the fourteenth century.

== Geography ==
Located in the Coastal Andhra region in Andhra Pradesh and also a Tondai Nadu region, the district is bordered by the Bay of Bengal to the east, Kadapa district to the west, Prakasam district and Markapuram district to the north, and Tirupati district to the south.

=== Climate ===
Maximum temperature occur during the summer at 36 to 46 °C (97 to 115 °F), while the minimum temperature occurs during the winter at 23 to 25 °C (73 to 77 °F). The average annual rainfall of the district is 1,080 mm (43 in), and reaches its peak during the southwest and northeast monsoons.

== Demographics ==
The reorganised Nellore district as of 2025 has a population of 2,345,052, of which 722,684 (30.82%) lived in urban areas based on the 2011 Census. It has a sex ratio of 983 females per 1000 males. Scheduled Castes and Scheduled Tribes make up 480,613 (20.49%) and 221,907 (9.46%) of the population respectively.

Languages of Nellore district (2011)
1. Telugu (87.96%)
2. Urdu (9.91%)
3. Others (2.13%)

Based on the 2011 census, 87.96% of the population spoke Telugu and 9.91% Urdu as their first language. There is also a small population of fishermen who speak a mix of Tamil and Telugu.

87.65% of people follow Hinduism while 11.10% of people follow Islam and 0.93% follow Christianity (this is a large underestimate).

Religions in Nellore district (2011)
Religion	Percent
Hinduism	87.65%
Islam	11.10%
Christianity	0.93%
Other or not stated	0.32%
Distribution of religions

== Administrative divisions ==
=== Mandals ===
The following lists the 36 mandals in Nellore district by their revenue division.

1. Atmakur revenue division
  1. Ananthasagaram
  2. Anumasamudrampeta
  3. Atmakur
  4. Chejerla
  5. Kaluvoya
  6. Marripadu
  7. Sangam
  8. Seetharamapuram
  9. Udayagiri
2. Gudur revenue division
  1. Gudur
  2. Kota
  3. Chillakur
3. Kavali revenue division
  1. Allur
  2. Bogole
  3. Dagadarthi
  4. Duttalur
  5. Jaladanki
  6. Kaligiri
  7. Kavali
  8. Kodavalur
  9. Kondapuram
  10. Varikuntapadu
  11. Vidavalur
  12. Vinjamur
4. Nellore revenue division
  1. Buchireddypalem
  2. Indukurpet
  3. Kovur
  4. Manubolu
  5. Muthukur
  6. Nellore rural
  7. Nellore urban
  8. Podalakur
  9. Rapur
  10. Sydapuram
  11. Thotapalli Gudur
  12. Venkatachalam

== Politics ==
=== Parliament segments ===
- Nellore (Lok Sabha constituency)
- Tirupati (Lok Sabha constituency)(partial).

=== Assembly constituency ===
The district has the following Legislative Assembly segments:

Constituency number	Name	Reserved for (SC/ST/None)	Parliament
119	Sarvepalli	None	Tirupati
120	Venkatagiri(Kaluvoya, Rapur, Sydapuram)	None	Tirupati
121	Gudur	sc	Tirupati
114	Kavali	None	Nellore
115	Atmakur	None	Nellore
116	Kovuru	None	Nellore
117	Nellore City	None	Nellore
118	Nellore Rural	None	Nellore
123	Udayagiri	None	Nellore

The district has four revenue divisions namely Gudur, Kavali, Atmakur and Nellore. These revenue divisions are divided into 36 mandals, which consist of 1,177 villages and 12 towns (urban settlements). A total of 940 gram panchayats exist in the district. The statutory towns consist of one municipal corporation (Nellore) and Four municipalities (Atmakur, Kavali, Buchireddypalem and Gudur).

== Cities and towns ==
The district has one municipal corporation at Nellore and four municipalities at Kavali, Gudur, Buchireddypalem and Atmakur. One Nagar panchayat at Allur.

List of Cities/towns in Nellore District
City/Town	Civic status	Revenue division	Population
Nellore	Municipal corporation	Nellore	558,548
Kavali	Municipality Grade - 1	Kavali	90,099
Gudur	Municipality Grade - 1	Gudur	77,246
Buchireddypalem	Municipality Grade - 2	Nellore	38,405
Atmakur	Municipality Grade - 3	Atmakur	30,556
Allur	Nagar panchayat	Kavali	26,392

== Transport ==
=== Road ===
NH 16, NH 67, NH 565 are the national highways that pass through the district.

=== Rail ===
Gudur - Vijayawada railway line passes through the district.

=== Nellore Airport ===
Nellore Airport is a proposed greenfield airport project near Dagadarthi, India, intended to serve the Nellore district. The airport is to be developed on 1,352 acres (5.47 km^{2}) of land with an estimated cost of ₹368 crore (equivalent to ₹499 crore or US$53 million in 2026).

==== Planning ====
In 2008, the government of Andhra Pradesh invited for expressions of interest to develop eight minor airports in the state, including an airport at Nellore. Each airport was expected to cost ₹50 crore (equivalent to ₹152 crore or US$16 million in 2026). The airports were to be built in 500–600 acres (2.0–2.4 km^{2}) with a runway length of 6,000 feet (1,800 m). The construction of this airport was chosen because Nellore is strategically situated between Vijayawada and Chennai, and Krishnapatnam Port is situated about 25 km (16 mi) from the city. However, AAI has rejected this proposal citing insufficient land available for the construction of the airport.

In 2013, Ministry of Civil Aviation had identified Nellore airport as one of the 50 locations across the country for low-cost airports to be built by the AAI. These airports would be built with bare minimum facilities for aircraft to operate, without compromising on safety and security.

In September 2017, the government of Andhra Pradesh solicited proposals for development of a no-frills greenfield airport at Dagadarthi under a public-private partnership. The development proposal by SCL-Turbo Consortium Pvt. Ltd. was accepted, along with the associated draft concession agreement and financial stipulations. The Arafath Group and ADP Ingénierie was to construct and operate the airport. SCL Turbo has formed a special purpose vehicle (SPV) Nellore International Airport Private Limited for the construction.

==== Construction ====
The airport was to be developed on 1,352 acres (5.47 km^{2}) of land with an estimated cost of ₹368 crore (equivalent to ₹499 crore or US$53 million in 2026). The project had received all clearances and approvals from various agencies. As per the agreement, the financial closure for the project was to be achieved by December 2018. On January 26, 2018, during his Republic Day speech, the District Collector R. Mutyala Raju announced that the acquisition of land for the airport was nearly completed.

The foundation stone was laid by then Andhra Pradesh Chief Minister N. Chandrababu Naidu on January 10, 2019. However, the YSR Congress Party led government, which was elected in May that year, moved to review all the major decisions taken by the previous government. In August 2019, the new government terminated its contract with Nellore International Airport Private Limited to develop the airport. The government said it would complete the project by handing the airport over to the AAI. In July 2020, the government formally scrapped the concession agreement signed with the SCL Turbo consortium. Later in November same year, the government has invited fresh bids from national and international companies for the construction of the airport.

After the government approved the report on Dec 21st 2021, It's expected that the first phase work could start as soon as April 2022.

== Tourism ==
Talpagiri Ranganathaswamy temple in Nellore is situated on the banks of the river Pennar. It is more than 600 years old. Translation of Maha Bharatam was said to be done by the poet Tikkana based at this place. Lord Narasimha appears as a huge of rock in ‘Yoga mudra' in Penchalakona. The deity is known as Somasila Narasimhaswamy. It is one of the Nava Narasimhas (nine manifestations). Chengalamma Parameswari temple lies in the village of Sullurpeta. It was built on the banks of the Kanlangi river. Chengalamma Jatara is celebrated here. Somasila dam on Pennar river, Kandaleru dam on Kandaleru river are popular with tourists. Udayagiri Fort at a height of 3079 feet is in ruins. Ranganatha temple, Balakrishna mandiram, Paruveta Mandapam, Chinna Masjid and pedda Masjid reflect the various culture of the rulers. Mypadu Beach, Koduru Beach are popular beaches in the district.

== Notable people ==
Among the politicians, Sarvepalli Radhakrishnan rose to position of President of India and Vice President of India and Venkaiah Naidu rose to the position of Vice President of India. Bezawada Gopala Reddy and N. Janardhana Reddy worked as chief ministers of unified Andhra Pradesh. Puchalapalli Sundarayya was one of the founding members of the Communist Party of India (Marxist). S. P. Balasubrahmanyam, M. S. Reddy Singeetam Srinivasa Rao, A. Kodandarami Reddy and Vanisri are some of the famous people of film industry. Gunturu Seshendra Sarma, T. Subbarami Reddy, Malli Mastan Babu, Ashwin Hebbar are also some of the popular personalities from other domains.
