= Tirupati Lok Sabha constituency =

Constituency of the Indian parliament in Andhra Pradesh

Coordinates: 13.6°N 79.4°E

Tirupati AP-23
- Lok Sabha constituency
- Interactive Map Outlining Tirupati Lok Sabha constituency

Constituency details
- Country: India
- Region: South India
- State: Andhra Pradesh
- Assembly constituencies: Gudur; Sarvepalli; Sullurpeta; Venkatagiri; Tirupati; Srikalahasti; Satyavedu
- Established: 1952
- Total electors: 17,29,832
- Reservation: SC

Member of Parliament
- 18th Lok Sabha
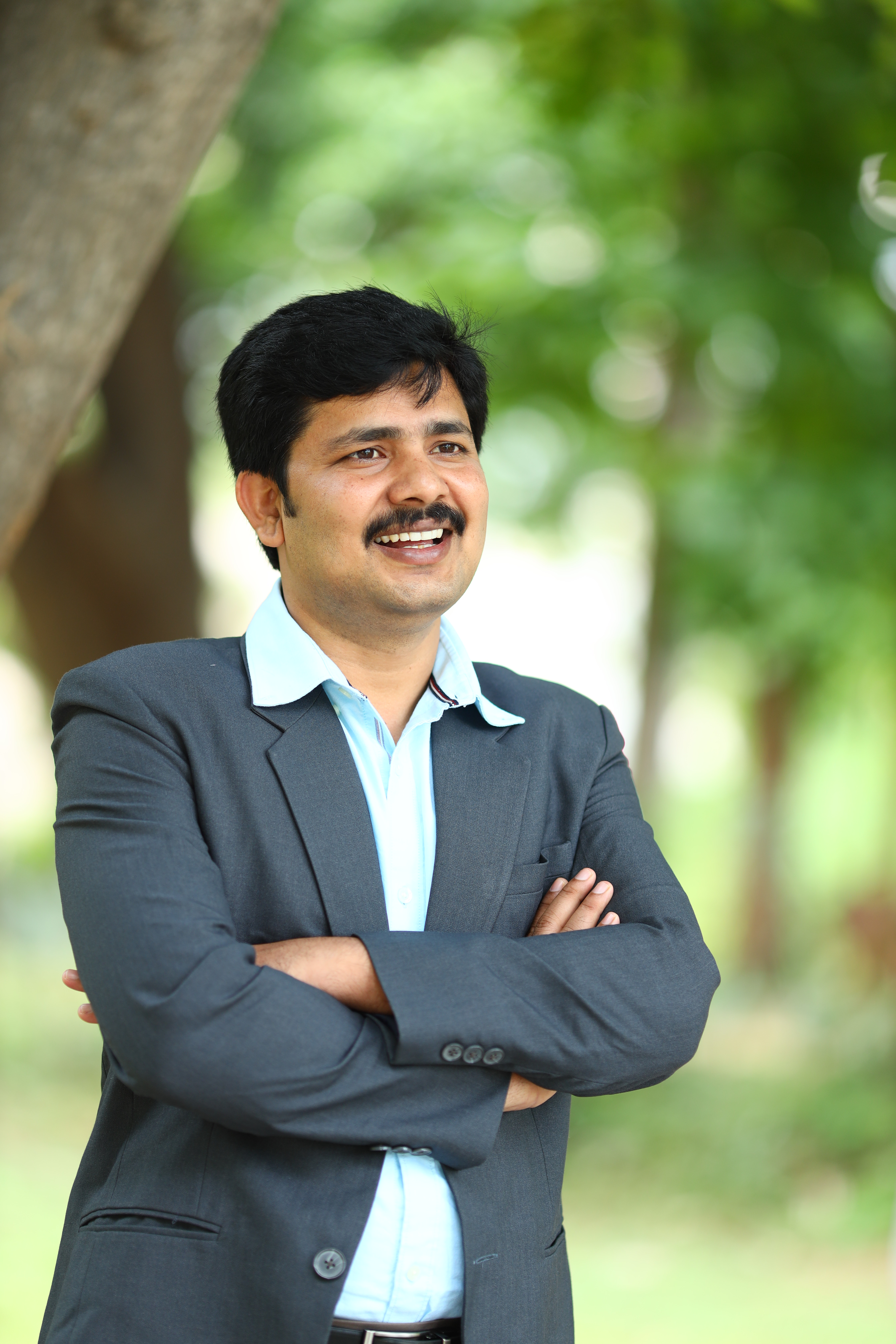
- Incumbent Maddila Gurumoorthy
- Party: YSRCP
- Alliance: None
- Elected year: 2024

Tirupati Lok Sabha constituency is one of the twenty-five Lok Sabha constituencies of Andhra Pradesh in India. It comprises seven assembly segments and belongs to Tirupati and Nellore districts.

== Assembly segments ==
The seven Assembly segments of Tirupati Lok Sabha constituency are:

#	Name	District	Members	Party	Leading (in 2024)
119	Sarvepalli	Nellore	Somireddy Chandra Mohan Reddy	TDP	YSRCP
120	Guduru(SC)	Nellore	Pasam Sunil Kumar	TDP	YSRCP
121	Sullurpeta(SC)	Tirupati	Nelavala Vijayasree	TDP	YSRCP
122	Venkatagiri	Tirupati	Kurugondla Ramakrishna	TDP	YSRCP
167	Tirupati	Tirupati	Arani Srinivasulu	JSP	BJP
168	Srikalahasti	Tirupati	Bojjala Venkata Sudhir Reddy	TDP	BJP
169	Satyavedu(SC)	Tirupati	Koneti Adimulam	TDP	YSRCP

== Members of Parliament ==
Year	Member	Party
1952	M. Ananthasayanam Ayyangar	Indian National Congress
1962	C. Dass	Indian National Congress
1967	C. Dass	Indian National Congress
1971	Thamburu Balakrishnaiah	Indian National Congress
1977	Thamburu Balakrishnaiah	Indian National Congress
1980	Thamburu Balakrishnaiah	Indian National Congress
1984	Chinta Mohan	Telugu Desam Party
1989	Chinta Mohan	Indian National Congress
1991	Chinta Mohan	Indian National Congress
1996	Nelavala Subrahmanyam	Indian National Congress
1998	Chinta Mohan	Indian National Congress
1999	Nandipaku Venkataswamy	Bharatiya Janata Party
2004	Chinta Mohan	Indian National Congress
2009	Chinta Mohan	Indian National Congress
2014	Velagapalli Varaprasad Rao	YSR Congress Party
2019	Balli Durga Prasad Rao	YSR Congress Party
2021	Maddila Gurumoorthy	YSR Congress Party
2024	Maddila Gurumoorthy	YSR Congress Party

== Election results ==
Vote share of Winning candidates
2024	45.73%
2021 (by-poll)	56.67%
2019	55.03%
2014	47.84%
2009	40.36%
2004	60.06%
1999	48.89%
1998	38.52%
1996	46.38%
1991	61.98%
1989	54.36%
1984	52.89%
1980	68.66%
1977	54.56%
1971	75.08%
1967	38.56%
1962	53.84%
1952	51.35%

=== 2024 ===
2024 Indian general election: Tirupathi (SC)
Party	Candidate	Votes	%	±%
YSRCP	Maddila Gurumoorthy	632,228	45.73	▼10.94
BJP	Velagapalli Varaprasad Rao (Note: Bharatiya Janata Party candidate was supported by Telugu Desam Party in this election as part of pre-poll alliance)	617,659	44.67	▲39.50
INC	Chinta Mohan	65,523	4.74	▲3.89
NOTA	None of the Above	16,118	1.17	▼0.24
BSP	Penumuru Gurappa	10,506	0.76	
IND	8 Independent Candidates	16,825	1.22	
OTH	11 Other Party Candidates	23,711	1.71	
Majority		14,569	1.06	▼23.53
Turnout		1,387,466	80.19	▲15.59
YSRCP hold		Swing		

=== 2021 by-election ===
Bye-election, 2021: Tirupati
Party	Candidate	Votes	%	±%
YSRCP	Maddila Gurumoorthy	626,108	56.67	▲1.64
TDP	Panabaka Lakshmi	354,516	32.09	▼5.56
BJP	K. Ratna Prabha	57,080	5.17	▲3.94
NOTA	None of the above	15,568	1.41	▼0.55
INC	Chinta Mohan	9,585	0.85	▼0.98
CPI(M)	Nellore Yadagiri	5,977	0.53	
Majority		271,592	24.59	▲7.21
Turnout		1,105,468	64.60	▼14.99
YSRCP hold		Swing		

=== 2019 ===
2019 Indian general election: Tirupathi (SC)
Party	Candidate	Votes	%	±%
YSRCP	Balli Durga Prasad Rao	722,877	55.03	▲7.19
TDP	Panabaka Lakshmi	494,501	37.65	
NOTA	None of the Above	25,781	1.96	▲1.24
INC	Chinta Mohan	24,039	1.83	▼0.92
BSP	Daggumati Sreehari Rao	20,971	1.60	▲1.10
BJP	Bommi Srihari Rao	16,125	1.23	▼43.53
IND	2 Independent Candidates	3,549	0.27	
OTH	5 Other Party Candidates	5,672	0.43	
Majority		228,376	17.38	▲14.30
Turnout		1,313,515	79.59	▲2.55
YSRCP hold		Swing		

=== 2014 ===
2014 Indian general election: Tirupathi (SC)
Party	Candidate	Votes	%	±%
YSRCP	Velagapalli Varaprasad Rao	580,376	47.84	
BJP	Karumanchi Jayaram	542,951	44.76	▲42.72
INC	Chinta Mohan	33,333	2.75	▼37.61
CPI(M)	Kothapalli Subramanyam	11,168	0.92	
NOTA	None of the Above	8,690	0.72	
AAP	Neerugutta Nageswara	7,280	0.60	
BSP	Dr. U. Ramachandra	6,036	0.50	
IND	6 Independent Candidates	10,538	0.87	
OTH	2 Other Party Candidates	12,690	1.05	
Majority		37,425	3.08	▲1.26
Turnout		1,213,064	77.04	▲4.52
YSRCP gain from INC		Swing		

=== 2009 ===
2009 Indian general election: Tirupati (SC)
Party	Candidate	Votes	%	±%
INC	Chinta Mohan	428,403	40.36	▼19.70
TDP	Varla Ramaiah	409,127	38.54	
PRP	Velagapalli Varaprasad Rao	171,638	16.17	
BJP	N. Venkataswamy	21,696	2.04	▼34.59
LSP	Juvvigunta Venkateswarlu	11,389	1.07	
IND	Yalavadi Munikrishnaiah	8,057	0.76	
PPOI	Degala Suryanarayana	3,839	0.36	
IND	Kattamanchi Prabakhar	2,871	0.27	
IND	Orepalli Venkata Krishna Prasad	2,258	0.21	
RPI(A)	Dhanasekhar Gundluru	2,255	0.21	
Majority		19,276	1.82	▼21.61
Turnout		1,061,533	72.52	
INC hold		Swing		

=== 2004 ===
2004 Indian general election: Tirupathi (SC)
Party	Candidate	Votes	%	±%
INC	Chinta Mohan	510,961	60.06	▲12.75
BJP	Dr. N. Venkata Swamy	311,633	36.63	▼12.26
TRS	K. Eswar Rao	16,508	1.94	
IND	Kattamanchi Prabhakar	11,685	1.37	
Majority		199,328	23.43	▲21.85
Turnout		850,787		
INC gain from BJP		Swing		

=== 1999 ===
1999 Indian general election: Tirupathi (SC)
Party	Candidate	Votes	%	±%
BJP	Dr. N. Venkataswamy	386,478	48.89	▲25.05
INC	Chinta Mohan	373,981	47.31	▲8.79
ATDP	T. Gunasekhar	12,311	1.56	
IND	Kattamanchi Prabhakar	8,143	1.03	
PPOI	P. Chiranjeevi	7,775	0.98	
AJBP	Polasi Mani	1,749	0.22	
Majority		12,497	1.58	▲0.33
Turnout		824,694	68.74	▲4.77
BJP gain from INC		Swing		

=== 1998 ===
1998 Indian general election: Tirupathi (SC)
Party	Candidate	Votes	%	±%
INC	Chinta Mohan	288,904	38.52	▼7.86
TDP	Dr. N. Sivaprasad	279,558	37.27	▼2.07
BJP	N. Venkataswamy	178,773	23.84	▲22.05
IND	Pari Ananda Rao	1,555	0.21	
IND	K. Prabhakar	1,200	0.16	
Majority		9,346	1.25	▼5.79
Turnout		759,887	63.97	▲1.19
INC hold		Swing		

=== 1996 ===
1996 Indian general election: Tirupathi (SC)
Party	Candidate	Votes	%	±%
INC	Nelavala Subrahmanyam	344,738	46.38	▼15.60
TDP	Gali Rajasree	292,406	39.34	▲6.83
NTDP	M. Murugaiah	79,915	10.75	
BJP	Kadiveti Pattabhi	13,315	1.79	▼1.62
AIIC(T)	M. Jayaramaiah	765	0.10	
IND	12 Independent Candidates	12,144	1.64	
Majority		52,332	7.04	▼22.43
Turnout		758,791	62.78	▲2.87
INC hold		Swing		

=== 1991 ===
1991 Indian general election: Tirupathi (SC)
Party	Candidate	Votes	%	±%
INC	Chinta Mohan	391,534	61.98	▲7.62
TDP	P. Subbaiah	205,345	32.51	▼12.15
BJP	P. Jayamma	21,526	3.41	
BSP	Puthalapattu Anjaiah	2,620	0.41	▲0.09
JP	P. Chengalavarayan	2,354	0.37	
IND	8 Independent Candidates	8,338	1.31	
Majority		186,189	29.47	▲19.77
Turnout		647,612	59.91	▼11.60
INC hold		Swing		

=== 1989 ===
1989 Indian general election: Tirupathi (SC)
Party	Candidate	Votes	%	±%
INC	Chinta Mohan	406,057	54.36	▲7.25
TDP	M. Muragaiah	333,557	44.66	▼8.23
BSP	P. Gurappa	2,398	0.32	
IND	Nagadev	1,744	0.23	
IND	G. Venu	1,627	0.22	
IND	K. S. Maniratnam	1,568	0.21	
Majority		72,500	9.70	▲3.92
Turnout		770,785	71.51	▲0.21
INC gain from TDP		Swing		

=== 1984 ===
1984 Indian general election: Tirupathi (SC)
Party	Candidate	Votes	%	±%
TDP	Chinta Mohan	318,467	52.89	
INC	Penchalaiah Pasala	283,686	47.11	▼21.55
Majority		34,781	5.78	▼38.29
Turnout		615,351	71.30	▲24.13
TDP gain from INC		Swing		

=== 1980 ===
1980 Indian general election: Tirupathi (SC)
Party	Candidate	Votes	%	±%
INC(I)	Pasala Penchalaiah	241,965	68.66	▲14.10
JP	Balakrishnaiah Tambura	86,659	24.59	▼20.85
JP(S)	Jayaramaiah Mallarapu	13,369	3.79	
IND	Munaswamy	6,459	1.83	
IND	T. Veeraraghavulu	2,885	0.82	
IND	M. Subbaramaiah	1,084	0.31	
Majority		155,306	44.07	▲34.95
Turnout		359,863	47.17	▼18.10
INC(I) gain from INC		Swing		

=== 1977 ===
1977 Indian general election: Tirupathi (SC)
Party	Candidate	Votes	%	±%
INC	Balakrishnaiah Tambura	240,394	54.56	▼20.52
JP	Allam Krishnaiah	200,214	45.44	
Majority		40,180	9.12	▼41.04
Turnout		454,492	65.27	▲10.39
INC hold		Swing		

=== 1971 ===
1971 Indian general election: Tirupathi (SC)
Party	Candidate	Votes	%	±%
INC	Balakrishnaiah Thamburu	231,262	75.08	▲36.52
SWA	C. V. Siddaiah Murthy	76,753	24.92	▼11.85
Majority		154,509	50.16	▲48.37
Turnout		316,437	54.88	▼17.60
INC hold		Swing		

=== 1967 ===
1967 Indian general election: Tirupathi (SC)
Party	Candidate	Votes	%	±%
INC	C. Dass	146,238	38.56	▼15.28
SWA	C. V. S. Moorthy	139,469	36.77	▼9.39
IND	C. Venkatiah	59,952	15.81	
IND	M. G. Venkatappa	26,587	7.01	
IND	M. Krishnamorthy	4,107	1.08	
IND	M. Venkatiah	2,932	0.77	
Majority		6,769	1.79	▼5.89
Turnout		392,936	72.48	▲12.69
INC hold		Swing		

=== 1962 ===
1962 Indian general election: Tirupathi (SC)
Party	Candidate	Votes	%	±%
INC	C. Dass	119,539	53.84	▲2.49
SWA	C. V. Siddaiah Murthy	102,491	46.16	
Majority		17,048	7.68	▲4.98
Turnout		229,016	59.79	▲0.36
INC hold		Swing		

=== 1952 ===
1951–52 Indian general election: Tirupathi
Party	Candidate	Votes	%	±%
INC	M. A. Ayyangar	114,782	51.35	
KLP	N. Venkataram Naidu	108,745	48.65	
Majority		6,037	2.70	
Turnout		223,527	59.43	
INC win (new seat)				

== See also ==
- List of constituencies of the Andhra Pradesh Legislative Assembly
