= First N. Chandrababu Naidu ministry =

Andhra Pradesh Council of Ministers headed by N. Chandrababu Naidu (1995–1999)

- 20th Ministry of Andhra Pradesh

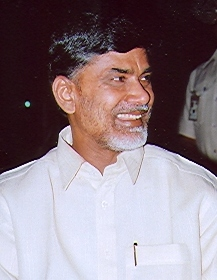
- N. Chandrababu Naidu
- Date formed: 1 September 1995
- Date dissolved: 11 October 1999

People and organisations
- Governor: Krishan Kant; C. Rangarajan
- Chief minister: N. Chandrababu Naidu
- Member parties: Telugu Desam Party
- Status in legislature: Majority
- Opposition party: Indian National Congress
- Opposition leader: P. Janardhan Reddy (Leader of the opposition)

History
- Election: 1994
- Outgoing election: 1989
- Legislature term: 4 years
- Predecessor: Fourth N. T. Rama Rao ministry
- Successor: Second N. Chandrababu Naidu ministry

The First N. Chandrababu Naidu ministry (or also known as 20th ministry of Andhra Pradesh) was formed with an 11 member cabinet on 1 September 1995 headed by N. Chandrababu Naidu.

== Council of Ministers ==
SI No.	Portfolio	Minister	Constituency	Tenure		Party
	Portfolio	Minister	Constituency	Took office	Left office	Party
	Chief Minister					
1.	Other Departments not Allocated to a Minister	N. Chandrababu Naidu	Kuppam	1 September 1995	11 October 1999	TDP
	Cabinet Ministers					
2.	Finance, Commercial Tax, Excise, Legislative affairs, Planning Revenue	Ashok Gajapathi Raju	Vizianagaram	1 September 1995	11 October 1999	TDP
3.	Revenue & Rehabilitation	Tulla Devender Goud	Medchal	1 September 1995	11 October 1999	TDP
4.	Home Affairs, Jails, Fire Services, NCC, Sainik Welfare, Film Development Corporation Cinematography	Alimineti Madhava Reddy	Bhongir	1 September 1995	11 October 1999	TDP
5.		S. V. Subba Reddy	Pattikonda	8 October 1995	11 October 1999	TDP
6.	Road Transport	Nandamuri Harikrishna	Hindupur	1 September 1995	11 October 1999	TDP
7.	Transport	K. Chandrashekar Rao	Siddipet	8 October 1995	11 October 1999	TDP
8.	Primary Education	Balli Durga Prasada Rao	Gudur	8 October 1995	11 October 1999	TDP
9.	Endowments Minister	Anjaneyulu Damacharla	Kondapi	8 October 1995	11 October 1999	TDP
10.	Minister for Law Courts	P. Chandrasekhar	Mahbubnagar	8 October 1995	11 October 1999	TDP
11.		Nallapareddy Prasannakumar Reddy	Kovur	8 October 1995	11 October 1999	TDP
12.	Health	Nagam Janardhan Reddy	Nagarkurnool	8 October 1995	11 October 1999	TDP
13.	Information Technology, Roads Buildings	Bojjala Gopala Krishna Reddy	Sri Kalahasti	8 October 1995	11 October 1999	TDP
14.	Heavy Water Irrigation Projects	Thummala Nageswara Rao	Sathupalli	8 October 1995	11 October 1999	TDP
15.	Small Scale Industries	Pasupuleti Brahmaiah	Rajampet	8 October 1995	11 October 1999	TDP
16.		Mootha Gopala Krishna	Kakinada	8 October 1995	11 October 1999	TDP
17.	BC Welfare, Co-operation Total Prohibition	Tulla Devender Goud	Medchal	1 September 1995	11 October 1999	TDP
18.	Stamps Registration	Tammineni Sitaram	Amadalavalasa	1 September 1995	11 October 1999	TDP
19.	Energy	Kalidindi Ramachandra Raju	Undi	8 October 1995	11 October 1999	TDP
20.	Marketing, Social Welfare, Education Irrigation	Kadiyam Srihari	Ghanpur (Station)	8 October 1995	11 October 1999	TDP
21.	Information and Public Relations Tourism	Samudrala Venugopal Chary	Nirmal	8 October 1995	11 October 1999	TDP
22.	Housing Development	Kothapalli Subbarayudu	Narsapuram	8 October 1995	11 October 1999	TDP
23.	Marketing	Veera Reddy Bijivemula	Badvel	8 October 1995	11 October 1999	TDP
24.	Excise	Mandava Venkateshwara Rao	Nizamabad	8 October 1995	11 October 1999	TDP
25.	Agriculture	Kotagiri Vidyadhara Rao	Chintalapudi	1 September 1995	11 October 1999	TDP
26.		Tallapaka Ramesh Reddy	Nellore City	8 October 1995	11 October 1999	TDP
27.	Endowments Commercial Taxes	Simhadri Satyanarayana Rao	Avanigadda	1 September 1995	11 October 1999	TDP
28.	Municipal Administration & Urban Development	B. Vishwa Mohan Reddy	Yemmiganur	8 October 1995	11 October 1999	TDP
29.		Chikkala Ramchandra Rao	Tallarevu	8 October 1995	11 October 1999	TDP
30.	Trade Taxes, Municipalities Home Affairs	Kimidi Kalavenkata Rao	Vunukuru	8 October 1995	11 October 1999	TDP
31.	Higher Education	K. Pratibha Bharati	Srikakulam	8 October 1995	11 October 1999	TDP
32.		Kinjarapu Yerran Naidu	Harishchandrapuram	8 October 1995	11 October 1999	TDP
33.	Animal Husbandry Fisheries	Reddy Satyanarayana	Madugula	8 October 1995	11 October 1999	TDP
34.		Boda Janardhan	Chennur	8 October 1995	11 October 1999	TDP
35.	Forest, Environment & Pollution Control	Nyalakonda Ramkishan Rao	Choppadandi	8 October 1995	11 October 1999	TDP
36.	Minorities, Wakf, Urdu Academy, Cinematography, Film Development Corporation, Science Technology	Basheeruddin Babu Khan	Bodan	8 October 1995	11 October 1999	TDP
37.		Koppula Harishwar Reddy	Pargi	8 October 1995	11 October 1999	TDP
38.		A. Chandrashekar	Vikarabad	8 October 1995	11 October 1999	TDP
39.	Major & Medium Irrigation Panchayat Raj	Kodela Siva Prasada Rao	Narasaraopet	8 October 1995	11 October 1999	TDP
40.	Youth Advancement & Sports	Somireddy Chandra Mohan Reddy	Sarvepalli	8 October 1995	11 October 1999	TDP
	Ministers of State					
41.	Housing	P. Ramasubba Reddy	Jammalamadugu	8 October 1995	11 October 1999	TDP
42.	Animal Husbandary, Dairy Development & Fisheries	Paleti Rama Rao	Chirala	8 October 1995	11 October 1999	TDP
43.	Women Child Welfare	Padala Aruna	Gajapathinagaram	8 October 1995	11 October 1999	TDP
44.		M. Mani Kumari	Araku	8 October 1995	11 October 1999	TDP
45.		Nettem Raghuram	Jaggayyapeta	8 October 1995	11 October 1999	TDP
46.	Information & Public Relations Culture	Naramalli Sivaprasad	Chittoor	8 October 1995	11 October 1999	TDP
47.		Pothuganti Ramulu	Achampet	8 October 1995	11 October 1999	TDP

== See also ==
- Andhra Pradesh Council of Ministers
- Third N. T. Rama Rao ministry
- Second N. Chandrababu Naidu ministry
