= Bojjala =

Bojjala (Telugu: బొజ్జల) is a Telugu surname. Notable people with the surname include:

- Bojjala Gopala Krishna Reddy (1949–2022), Indian politician
- Bojjala Sudhir Reddy (born 1980), Indian politician
