= Sullurpeta Assembly constituency =

Constituency of the Andhra Pradesh Legislative Assembly, India

Coordinates: 13.70°N 80.02°E

Sullurpeta
- Constituency No. 121 for the Andhra Pradesh Legislative Assembly
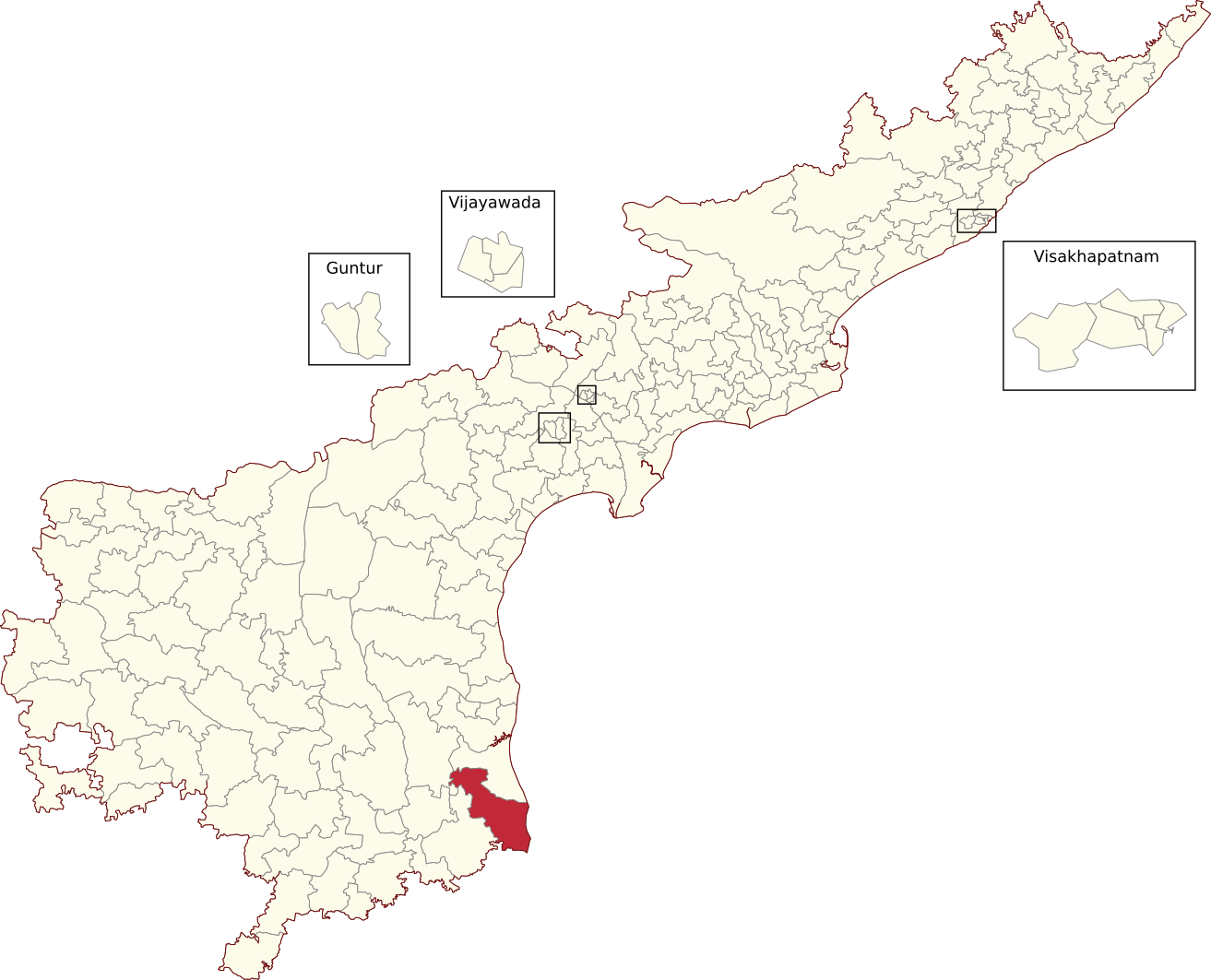
- Location of Sullurpeta Assembly constituency within Andhra Pradesh

Constituency details
- Country: India
- Region: South India
- State: Andhra Pradesh
- District: Tirupati
- Lok Sabha constituency: Tirupati
- Established: 1962
- Total electors: 231,638
- Reservation: SC

Member of Legislative Assembly
- 16th Andhra Pradesh Legislative Assembly
- Incumbent Nelavala Vijayasree
- Party: TDP
- Alliance: NDA
- Elected year: 2024

Sullurpeta is a SC reserved constituency in Tirupati district of Andhra Pradesh that elects representatives to the Andhra Pradesh Legislative Assembly in India. It is one of the seven assembly segments of Tirupati Lok Sabha constituency.

Nelavala Vijayasree is the current MLA of the constituency, having won the 2024 Andhra Pradesh Legislative Assembly election from Telugu Desam Party. As of 4 June 2024, there are a total of 231,638 electors in the constituency. The constituency was established in 1962, as per the Delimitation Orders (1962).

== Mandals ==
Mandal
Ojili
Naidupeta
Pellakur
Doravarisatram
Sullurupeta
Tada

== Members of the Legislative Assembly ==
| Year | Member | Political party |
|---|---|---|
| 1962 | Pasupuleti Siddiahnaidu | Indian National Congress |
| 1967 | Pitla Venkata Subbaiah | Indian National Congress |
| 1972 | Pitla Venkata Subbaiah | Indian National Congress |
| 1978 | Pitla Venkata Subbaiah | Indian National Congress |
| 1985 | Madanambeti Maneiah | Telugu Desam Party |
| 1989 | Pasala Penchalaiah | Indian National Congress |
| 1994 | Parasa Venkata Ratnaiah | Telugu Desam Party |
| 1999 | Parasa Venkata Ratnaiah | Telugu Desam Party |
| 2004 | Nelavala Subrahmanyam | Indian National Congress |
| 2009 | Parasa Venkata Ratnaiah | Telugu Desam Party |
| 2014 | Sanjeevaiah Kiliveti | YSR Congress Party |
| 2019 | Sanjeevaiah Kiliveti | YSR Congress Party |
| 2024 | Nelavala Vijayasree | Telugu Desam Party |

== Election results ==
=== 2004 ===
2004 Andhra Pradesh Legislative Assembly election: Sullurupeta
| Party | Candidate | Votes | % | ±% |
|---|---|---|---|---|
| INC | Nelavala Subramanyam | 56,939 | 49.99 | +5.76 |
| TDP | Parasa Venkata Rathnaih | 48,124 | 42.25 | −11.67 |
| Majority | | 8,815 | 7.74 | |
| Turnout | | 113,894 | 73.85 | +5.13 |
| INC gain from TDP | | Swing | | |

=== 2009 ===
2009 Andhra Pradesh Legislative Assembly election: Sullurupeta
| Party | Candidate | Votes | % | ±% |
|---|---|---|---|---|
| TDP | Parasa Venkata Ratnaiah | 66,089 | 41.34 | −0.91 |
| INC | Vinnamala Saraswathi | 60,722 | 37.98 | −12.01 |
| PRP | Garika Eswaramma | 24,832 | 15.53 | |
| Majority | | 5,367 | 3.36 | |
| Turnout | | 159,872 | 75.35 | +1.50 |
| TDP gain from INC | | Swing | | |

=== 2014 ===
2014 Andhra Pradesh Legislative Assembly election: Sullurupeta
| Party | Candidate | Votes | % | ±% |
|---|---|---|---|---|
| YSRCP | Sanjeevaiah Kiliveti | 85,343 | 48.10 | |
| TDP | Parasa Venkata Ratnaiah | 81,617 | 46.00 | |
| Majority | | 3,726 | 2.10 | |
| Turnout | | 177,444 | 78.10 | +2.75 |
| YSRCP gain from TDP | | Swing | | |

=== 2019 ===
2019 Andhra Pradesh Legislative Assembly election: Sullurupeta
| Party | Candidate | Votes | % | ±% |
|---|---|---|---|---|
| YSRCP | Sanjeevaiah Kiliveti | 119,627 | 61.99% | |
| TDP | Parasa Venkata Ratnam | 58,335 | 30.23% | |
| JSP | Praveen Uyyala | 5513 | 2.86% | |
| BJP | Dasari Ratnam | 1734 | 0.90% | |
| INC | Chandanamudi Pedda Eswaraiah | 2698 | 1.40% | |
| Majority | | 61,292 | 38% | |
| Turnout | | 1,92,963 | 62% | |
| YSRCP hold | | Swing | +13.89 | |

=== 2024 ===
2024 Andhra Pradesh Legislative Assembly election: Sullurupeta
| Party | Candidate | Votes | % | ±% |
|---|---|---|---|---|
| TDP | Nelavala Vijayasree | 111,048 | 54.67 | |
| YSRCP | Sanjeevaiah Kiliveti | 81,933 | 40.33 | |
| INC | Chandanamudi Shiva | 4,124 | 2.03 | |
| NOTA | None Of The Above | 3,423 | 1.69 | |
| Majority | | 29,118 | 14.33 | |
| Turnout | | 2,03,138 | | |
| TDP gain from YSRCP | | Swing | | |

== See also ==
- List of constituencies of the Andhra Pradesh Legislative Assembly
