= Somireddy Chandra Mohan Reddy =

Indian politician

Minister of Agriculture, Horticulture, Sericulture and Agri-Processing Government of Andhra Pradesh
- In office 2 April 2017 – 29 May 2019
- Governor: E. S. L. Narasimhan
- Chief Minister: N. Chandrababu Naidu
- Preceded by: Prathipati Pulla Rao
- Succeeded by: Kanna Babu

Member of Legislative Council Andhra Pradesh
- In office 14 June 2015 – 15 February 2019
- Chairman: A. Chakrapani; N. M. D. Farooq
- Leader of the House: N. Chandrababu Naidu
- Constituency: Elected by MLA's

Minister of Information and Broadcasting Government of Andhra Pradesh
- In office 26 November 2001 – 14 May 2004
- Governor: C. Rangarajan; Surjit Singh Barnala
- Chief Minister: N. Chandrababu Naidu
- Preceded by: Bojjala Gopala Krishna Reddy
- Succeeded by: Komatireddy Venkat Reddy

Minister of Youth Services and Sports Government of Andhra Pradesh
- In office 1996–1999
- Governor: Krishan Kant; C. Rangarajan
- Chief Minister: N. Chandrababu Naidu
- Preceded by: Dasyam Pranay Bhasker
- Succeeded by: Naramalli Sivaprasad

Member of Legislative Assembly Andhra Pradesh
- Incumbent
- Assumed office 2024
- Preceded by: Kakani Govardhan Reddy
- Constituency: Sarvepalli
- In office 1994–2004
- Preceded by: Chitturi Venkata Sesha Reddy
- Succeeded by: Adala Prabhakara Reddy
- Constituency: Sarvepalli

Personal details
- Born: 26 March 1956 (age 70) Allipuram, Nellore District, Andhra Pradesh, India
- Party: Telugu Desam Party
- Parent: Somireddy Raj Gopal Reddy (father)
- Education: Andhra University
- Nickname: CM

Somireddy Chandra Mohan Reddy is an Indian politician from Sarvepalli in Nellore district of Andhra Pradesh and a member of the Telugu Desam Party. He is currently a member of the Legislative Assembly and a former member of the Legislative Council. Previously, he has held several cabinet ministerial positions in the state of Andhra Pradesh.

== Personal life ==
Reddy was born on 26 March 1956 in Allipuram, Nellore, Andhra Pradesh, India. He served as DCCB chairman in 1987. He was a protester of Anti-Sara Movement during 1991 and 1992. As the movement progressed and Late N. T. Rama Rao agreed with Reddy to join him, Chief Minister of Andhra Pradesh Kotla Vijaya Bhaskara Reddy relented and outlawed it.

== Political career ==
Reddy was appointed in-charge of the Telugu Desam Party (TDP) for Nellore district in 1992. He contested and won as a Member of Legislative Assembly (MLA) for the first time from the Sarvepalli Assembly constituency in 1994. During 1996 to 1999, he was appointed as the Minister of Youth Services and Sports under the First N. Chandrababu Naidu ministry.

In 1999, Reddy once again contested as an MLA and won, representing the same constituency until 2004. In 2001, He was appointed as the Minister of Information and Broadcasting under the Second N. Chandrababu Naidu ministry. In 2004, he was again appointed the in-charge of the TDP for Nellore district. Later, in 2011 he became a member of the TDP politburo.

In 2015, he was nominated and appointed as a Member of the Legislative Council (MLC) and served as the Minister of Agriculture, Horticulture, Sericulture and Agri-Processing from 2017 to 2019 under the Third N. Chandrababu Naidu ministry. He resigned as an MLC in 2019 to contest as a Member of Legislative Assembly from Sarvepalli in the 2019 Andhra Pradesh Legislative Assembly election.

Reddy is considered one of the oldest continuing members and played a key role in the TDP activities. He contested and won as a Member of the Legislative Assembly from Sarvepalli in the 2024 Andhra Pradesh Legislative Assembly election after nearly 2 decades.
