= Maddila Gurumoorthy =

Indian politician (born 1985)

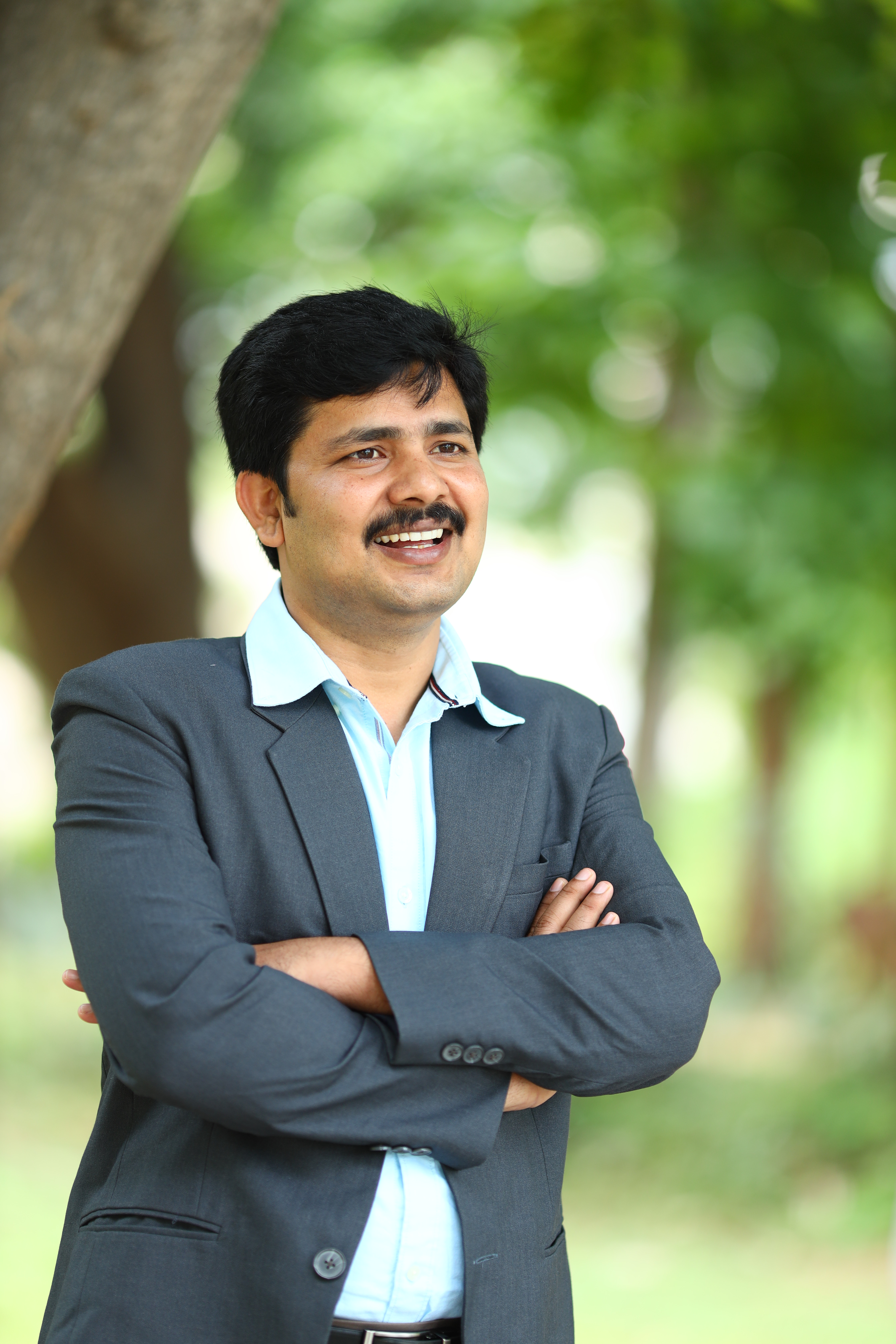
- Gurumoorthy in 2021

Member of Parliament, Lok Sabha
- Incumbent
- Assumed office 2 May 2021
- Preceded by: Balli Durga Prasad Rao
- Constituency: Tirupati

Personal details
- Born: 22 June 1985 (age 41) Mannasamudram Village, Chittoor, Andhra Pradesh, India
- Citizenship: India
- Party: YSR Congress Party
- Spouse: Navya Kiran
- Children: 2
- Parent(s): Muni Krishnayya, Ramanamma
- Education: Sri Venkateswara Institute of Medical Sciences
- Occupation: Politician • Physiotherapist

Maddila Gurumoorthy (born 22 June 1985) is an Indian politician from YSR Congress Party. He was elected as MP in 2021 by-polls from Tirupati Andhra Pradesh, India. The bye-election, held on 17 April following the death of sitting MP YSRCP's Balli Durga Prasad Rao in September 2020.

== Electoral performance ==
He won the 2021 By Poll on Former Union Minister Panabaka Lakhmi of TDP being a YSR Congress Party candidate. He won the election with a thumping majority of 2,71,592 votes against his closest rival Panabaka Lakshmi of Telugu Desam Party. He retained the seat in 2024 elections with a reduced margin of 14569 votes.

== First term 2021–2024 ==
He began his first term as a Member of Parliament on 2 May 2021. His individual attendance at the Parliament is 91%.

=== By Poll 2021 ===
Bye-election, 2021: Tirupati
| Party | Candidate | Votes | % | ±% |
|---|---|---|---|---|
| YSRCP | Maddila Gurumoorthy | 6,26,108 | 56.67 | +1.64 |
| TDP | Panabaka Lakshmi | 3,54,516 | 32.09 | −5.57 |
| BJP | K. Ratna Prabha | 57,080 | 5.17 | +3.95 |
| NOTA | None of the above | 15,568 | 1.41 | −0.45 |
| INC | Chinta Mohan | 9,585 | 0.85 | −0.98 |
| CPI(M) | Nellore Yadagiri | 5,977 | 0.53 | |
| Majority | | 2,71,592 | 24.59 | +7.21 |
| Turnout | | 11,05,468 | 64.60 | −14.76 |
| YSRCP hold | | Swing | | |
