= Balli Kalyanachakravarthy =

Indian politician (born 1984)

Balli Kalyan Chakravarthy
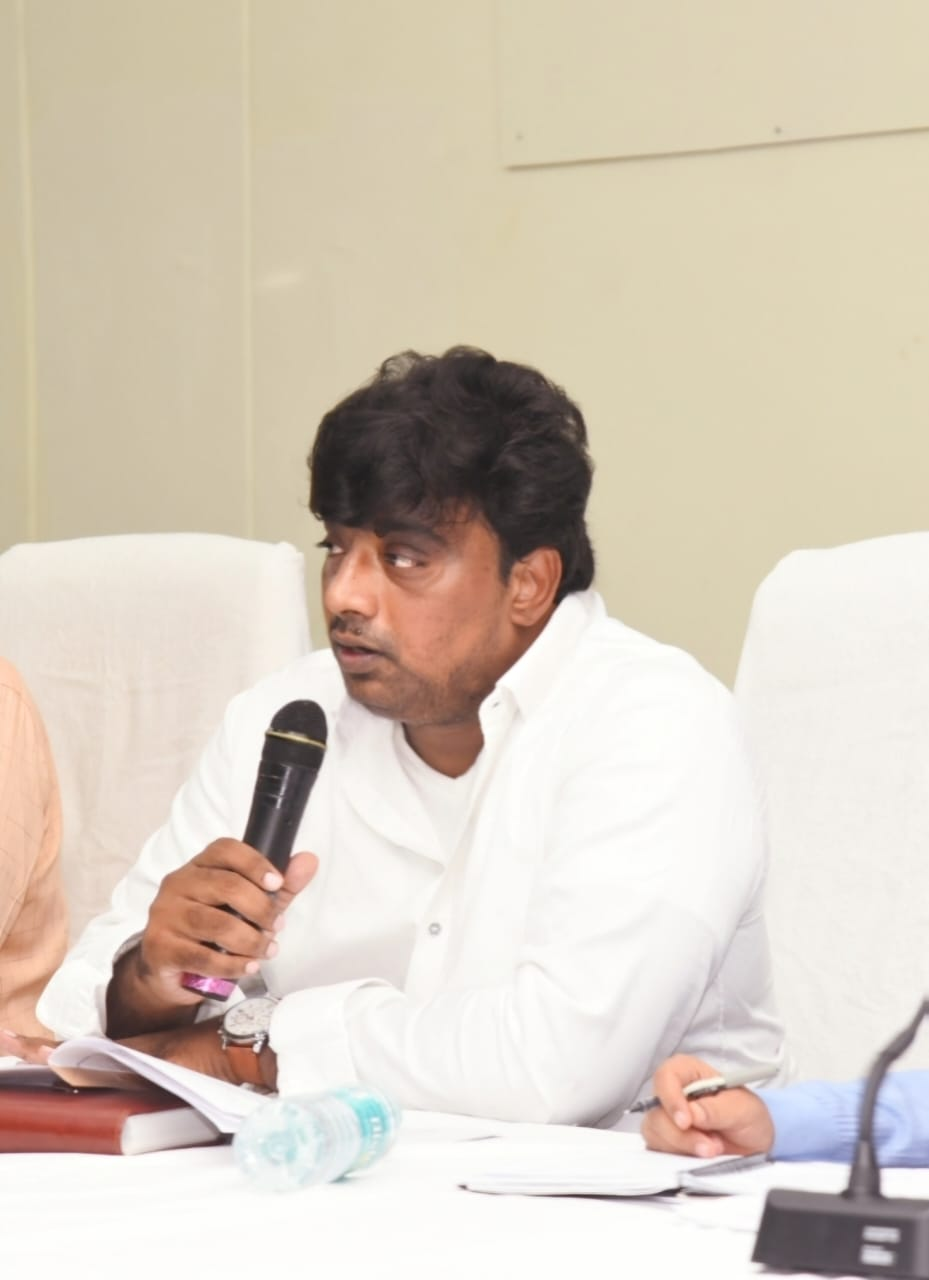

Member of the Andhra Pradesh Legislative Council
- In office 31 March 2021 – 31 August 2027

Personal details
- Born: 7 June 1984 (age 42)
- Party: Telugu Desam Party (from 19 September 2025); YSR Congress Party (until 2024)
- Parent: Balli Durga Prasad Rao (father)

Balli Kalyanachakravarthy (born 7 June 1984), also referred to as Balli Kalyan Chakravarthy, is an Indian businessman and politician who has served in the Andhra Pradesh Legislative Council from 2021 to 2024 as a member of the YSR Congress Party. Kalyanachakravarthy is from the town of Gudur in the Nellore district. He co-founded the company Nihibha Online Business Private Limited in 2015.

Kalyanachakravarthy's father is Balli Durga Prasad Rao, a longtime member of the Andhra Pradesh Legislative Assembly who had been elected to the Lok Sabha in 2019, representing the Tirupati constituency. His father died in office in September 2020 from a heart attack after contracting COVID-19.

In 2021, Kalyanachakravarthy considered running in the by-election for his father's seat in the Lok Sabha. However, Y. S. Jagan Mohan Reddy, the chief minister of Andhra Pradesh, instead offered to nominate Kalyanachakravarthy as a candidate for the Andhra Pradesh Legislative Council. Kalyanachakravarthy accepted the offer, and was elected unanimously by the MLAs for a six-year term on 8 March 2021. He was sworn into office on 31 March 2021.

On 31 August 2024, Kalyanachakravarthy resigned from the Legislative Council and left the YSRCP for the Telugu Desam Party.

Kalyanachakravarthy joined Telugu Desam Party in the presence of Chief Minister Nara Chandrababu Naidu on 19 September 2025.
