= S. V. Mohan Reddy =

Indian politician

Somula Venkat Mohan Reddy (born 1963) is an Indian politician from Andhra Pradesh. He was a former member of the Andhra Pradesh Legislative Assembly from Kurnool Assembly constituency in Kurnool district representing the YSR Congress Party.

== Early life ==
Reddy is from Kurnool, Andhra Pradesh. He is the son of Somula Venkata Subba Reddy, a three-time MLA from Pattikonda. He did his intermediate (plus two) at YPMM Government Junior Collge, Allagadda in 1980 and later completed his B.Com in 1983 at Bhadruka College, Hyderabad which is affiliated with Osmania University. He runs his own business and declared assets worth Rs.7 crore in his affidavit to the Election Commission of India.

== Career ==
Reddy won the Kurnool Assembly constituency in the 2014 Andhra Pradesh Legislative Assembly election representing the YSR Congress Party. He polled 57,962 and defeated his nearest rival, T. G. Venkatesh of the Telugu Desam Party, by a margin of votes. In May 2016, he joined the Telugu Desam Party.
