= List of ministers of industries and commerce of Andhra Pradesh =

Head of the Ministry of Industries & Commerce of the Government of Andhra Pradesh

Minister of Industries and Commerce
- Pariśramalu mariyu Vāṇijya Śākha Mantrī
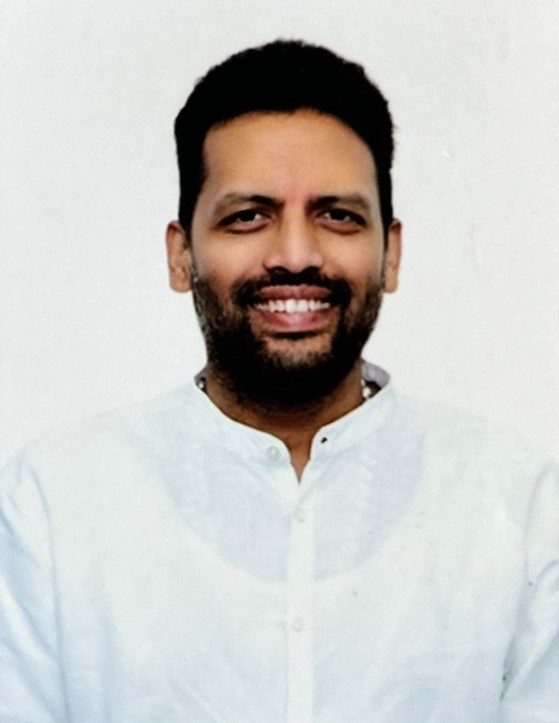
- Incumbent; T. G. Bharath since 12 June 2024
- Department of Industries and Commerce
- Member of: Andha Pradesh Cabinet
- Reports to: Governor of Andhra Pradesh; Chief Minister of Andhra Pradesh; Andhra Pradesh Legislature
- Appointer: Governor of Andhra Pradesh on the advice of the chief minister of Andhra Pradesh
- Inaugural holder: N. Chandrababu Naidu
- Formation: 8 June 2014
- Website: Official website

Minister of Industries and Commerce or simply referred to as the Industry Minister, is officially known as the Minister of Industries & Commerce. The current Minister of Industries & Commerce of Andhra Pradesh is T. G. Bharath.

== List of ministers ==
Key

- ^{†} Assassinated or died in office

#	Portrait	Minister (Lifespan) Constituency	Term of office			Election (Term)	Party	Ministry	Chief Minister	Ref.
#	Portrait	Minister (Lifespan) Constituency	Term start	Term end	Duration	Election (Term)	Party	Ministry	Chief Minister	Ref.
–		N. Chandrababu Naidu (born 1950); MLA for Kuppam (Chief Minister)	8 June 2014	1 April 2017	2 years, 297 days	2014 (14th)	Telugu Desam Party	Naidu III	N. Chandrababu Naidu	
1		N. Amarnath Reddy (born 1959); MLA for Palamaner	2 April 2017	29 May 2019	2 years, 57 days	2014 (14th)	Telugu Desam Party	Naidu III	N. Chandrababu Naidu	
2		Mekapati Goutham Reddy (1971–2022); MLA for Atmakur	19 June 2019	21 February 2022 ^{†}	2 years, 247 days	2019 (15th)	YSR Congress Party	Jagan	Y. S. Jagan Mohan Reddy	
3		Buggana Rajendranath Reddy (born 1970); MLA for Dhone	14 March 2022	7 April 2022	24 days	2019 (15th)	YSR Congress Party	Jagan	Y. S. Jagan Mohan Reddy	
4		Gudivada Amarnath MLA for Anakapalli	11 April 2022	6 June 2024	2 years, 56 days	2019 (15th)	YSR Congress Party	Jagan	Y. S. Jagan Mohan Reddy	
5		T. G. Bharath (born 1976); MLA for Kurnool	12 June 2024	Incumbent	2 years, 87 days	2024 (16th)	Telugu Desam Party	Naidu IV	N. Chandrababu Naidu	
