= T. G. Bharath =

Indian politician and philanthropist

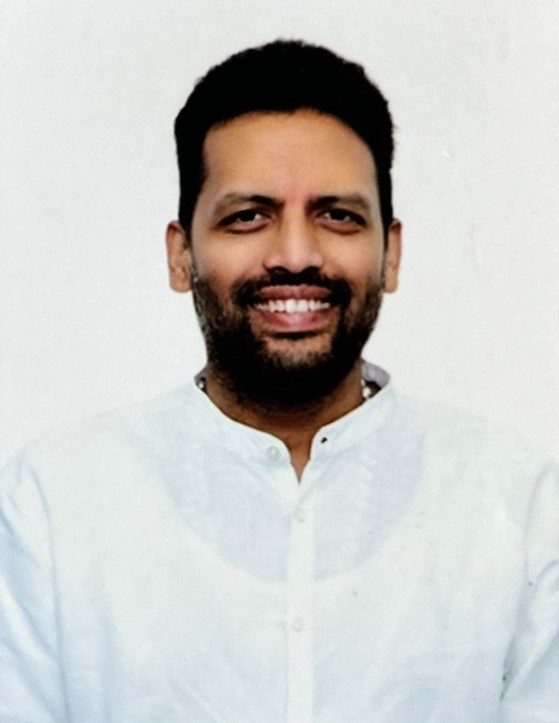
- Official portrait, 2024

Minister of Industries and Commerce Government of Andhra Pradesh
- Incumbent
- Assumed office 12 June 2024
- Governor: S. Abdul Nazeer
- Chief Minister: N. Chandrababu Naidu
- Preceded by: Gudivada Amarnath

Minister of Food Processing Government of Andhra Pradesh
- Incumbent
- Assumed office 12 June 2024
- Governor: S. Abdul Nazeer
- Chief Minister: N. Chandrababu Naidu
- Preceded by: Kakani Govardhan Reddy

Member of the Andhra Pradesh Legislative Assembly
- Incumbent
- Assumed office 2024
- Preceded by: Abdul Hafeez Khan
- Constituency: Kurnool

Personal details
- Born: 5 August 1976 (age 50) Vijayawada, Andhra Pradesh
- Party: Telugu Desam Party
- Children: 2
- Parent: T. G. Venkatesh (father)
- Education: Cardiff University (MBA)

Tumbalam Gooty Bharath (born 5 August 1976) is an Indian politician from Andhra Pradesh. He has been a member of the Telugu Desam Party since 2014. He won the 2024 Andhra Pradesh Legislative Assembly election from Kurnool Assembly Constituency. He is currently serving as the cabinet minister in Government of Andhra Pradesh.
