= Gudur Assembly constituency =

Constituency of the Andhra Pradesh Legislative Assembly, India

Coordinates: 14.14°N 79.84°E

Gudur
- Constituency No. 120 for the Andhra Pradesh Legislative Assembly
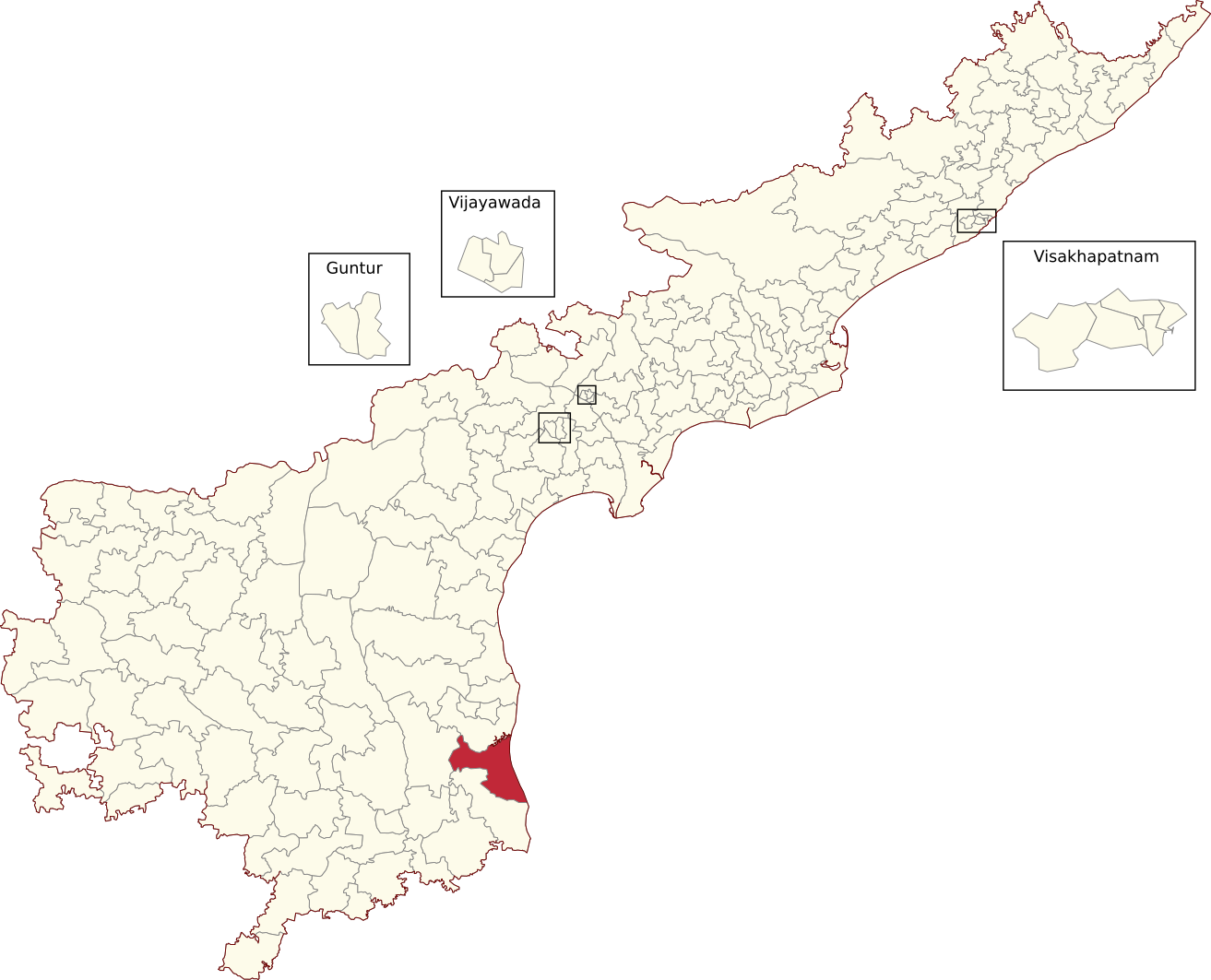
- Location of Gudur Assembly constituency within Andhra Pradesh

Constituency details
- Country: India
- Region: South India
- State: Andhra Pradesh
- District: Nellore, Tirupati
- Lok Sabha constituency: Tirupati
- Established: 1951
- Total electors: 236,496
- Reservation: SC

Member of Legislative Assembly
- 16th Andhra Pradesh Legislative Assembly
- Incumbent Pasam Sunil Kumar
- Party: TDP
- Alliance: NDA
- Elected year: 2024

Gudur is a Scheduled Caste reserved constituency in Tirupati district and Nellore districts of Andhra Pradesh that elects representatives to the Andhra Pradesh Legislative Assembly in India. It is one of the seven assembly segments of Tirupati Lok Sabha constituency.

Pasam Sunil Kumar is the current MLA of the constituency, having won the 2024 Andhra Pradesh Legislative Assembly election from Telugu Desam Party. As of 25 March 2019, there are a total of 236,496 electors in the constituency. The constituency was established in 1951, as per the Delimitation Orders (1951).

== Mandals ==
Mandal	District
Gudur	Nellore
Chillakur	Nellore
Kota	Nellore
Vakadu	Tirupati
Chittamur	Tirupati

== Members of the Legislative Assembly ==
Year	Member	Political party
1952	Pelleti Gopalakrishna Reddy	Indian National Congress
1955	Pelleti Gopalakrishna Reddy	Indian National Congress
1962	Pelleti Gopalakrishna Reddy	Indian National Congress
1967	V. Ramachandra Reddy	Independent
1972	Srinivasulu Reddy Nallapareddy	Independent
1978	Patra Prakasa Rao	Indian National Congress
1983	Ogi Masthanaiah	Independent
1985	Balli Durga Prasad Rao	Telugu Desam Party
1989	Patra Prakasa Rao	Indian National Congress
1994	Balli Durga Prasad Rao	Telugu Desam Party
1999	Balli Durga Prasad Rao	Telugu Desam Party
2004	Patra Prakasa Rao	Indian National Congress
2009	Balli Durga Prasad Rao	Telugu Desam Party
2014	Pasam Sunil Kumar	YSR Congress Party
2019	Varaprasad Rao Velagapalli	YSR Congress Party
2024	Pasam Sunil Kumar	Telugu Desam Party

== Election results ==
=== 1952 ===
1952 Madras Legislative Assembly election: Gudur
Party	Candidate	Votes	%	±%
INC	Pellati Gopalakrishna Reddy	18,175	40.94%	40.94%
Independent	Katamareddy Raja Rami Reddy	15,052	33.90%	
CPI	Chani Chinna Subbiah	7,376	16.61%	
KMPP	Guddeti Veerasubramahyam	2,658	5.99%	
Independent	Tatiparthi Peter Luthar	1,137	2.56%	
Margin of victory		3,123	7.03%	
Turnout		44,398	63.32%	
Registered electors		70,116		
INC win (new seat)				

=== 2004 ===
2004 Andhra Pradesh Legislative Assembly election: Gudur
Party	Candidate	Votes	%	±%
INC	Patra Prakasa Rao	62,809	52.28	+11.79
TDP	Dr. Vukkala Rajeswaramma	53,978	44.93	−6.70
Majority		8,831	7.35	
Turnout		120,132	71.79	+6.22
INC gain from TDP		Swing		

=== 2009 ===
2009 Andhra Pradesh Legislative Assembly election: Gudur
Party	Candidate	Votes	%	±%
TDP	Balli Durga Prasda Rao	64,330	42.09	−2.84
INC	Panabaka Krishnaiah	53,092	34.74	−17.54
PRP	Babu Ravindra Manapati	27,318	17.87	
Majority		11,238	7.35	
Turnout		152,836	72.55	+0.76
TDP gain from INC		Swing		

=== 2014 ===
2014 Andhra Pradesh Legislative Assembly election: Gudur
Party	Candidate	Votes	%	±%
YSRCP	Pasam Sunil Kumar	80,698	48.01	
TDP	Dr.Bathala Radha Jyothsna Latha	71,650	42.63	+0.54
Majority		9,048	5.38	
Turnout		168,083	78.11	+5.46
YSRCP gain from TDP		Swing		

=== 2019 ===
2019 Andhra Pradesh Legislative Assembly election: Gudur
Party	Candidate	Votes	%	±%
YSRCP	Varaprasad Rao Velagapalli	109,759	59.58	+11.57
TDP	Pasam Sunil Kumar	64,301	34.90	
Majority		45,459	24.70	
Turnout		1,84,230	77.90	
YSRCP hold		Swing		

=== 2024 ===
2024 Andhra Pradesh Legislative Assembly election: Gudur
Party	Candidate	Votes	%	±%
TDP	Pasam Sunil Kumar	102,675	52.77	
YSRCP	Meriga Muralidhar	81483	41.88	
INC	Dr. U. Ramakrishna Rao	3308	1.7	
NOTA	None Of The Above	3129	1.61	
Majority		21192	10.89	
Turnout		194565		
TDP gain from YSRCP		Swing		
