= Kakani Govardhan Reddy =

Indian politician

Minister of Agriculture, Cooperation & Marketing Government of Andhra Pradesh
- In office 11 April 2022 – 11 June 2024
- Governor: Biswabhusan Harichandan; S. Abdul Nazeer
- Chief Minister: Y. S. Jagan Mohan Reddy
- Preceded by: Kurasala Kannababu
- Succeeded by: T. G. Bharath

Member of Legislative Assembly Andhra Pradesh
- In office 2014–2024
- Preceded by: Adala Prabhakara Reddy
- Succeeded by: Somireddy Chandra Mohan Reddy
- Constituency: Sarvepalli

Chairman of Nellore Zilla Praja Parishad
- In office 2006–2011
- Preceded by: Chenchal Babu yadav
- Succeeded by: Bommireddy Raghavendra Reddy

Personal details
- Born: 10 November 1964 (age 61) Thoderu (v), Podalakur (M), SPSR Nellore, Andhra Pradesh, India
- Party: YSR Congress (2011–present)
- Other political affiliations: Indian National Congress (Before 2011)
- Children: 2
- Website: https://rkkanigvrdn.wixsite.com/kakani

Kakani Govardhan Reddy (born 10 November 1964) is an Indian Politician, who served as the Minister for Agriculture, Cooperation, Marketing, Food Processing in Government of Andhra Pradesh and was a Member of the Legislative Assembly (India) from Sarvepalli (Assembly constituency) of Andhra Pradesh Legislative Assembly. He won as an MLA for the second time from this constituency in 2019 Andhra Pradesh Legislative Assembly election being a Yuvajana Sramika Rythu Congress Party (YSR Congress Party) candidate. Earlier he was elected as an MLA from the same constituency in 2014 Andhra Pradesh Legislative Assembly election.

He started his political career as the Zilla Parishad Chairman of Sri Potti Sri Ramulu Nellore District in 2006. Later he joined Y. S. Jaganmohan Reddy's YSR Congress party in 2011. He is also working as YSR Congress Party's parliament district president for Nellore (Lok Sabha constituency).
