= M. Abdul Gafoor =

Indian politician

Member of Legislative Assembly Andhra Pradesh
- In office 2004–2009
- Preceded by: T. G. Venkatesh
- Succeeded by: T. G. Venkatesh
- Constituency: Kurnool
- In office 1994–1999
- Preceded by: V. Rama Bhupal Chowdry
- Succeeded by: T. G. Venkatesh
- Constituency: Kurnool

M. Abdul Gafoor is a CITU Andhra Pradesh State Secretary, All India CITU Vice President and CPM Central Committee Member, Founder Awwaz State President. Twice he was elected MLA from Kurnool, 1994, 2004, Member of the Legislative Assembly in Andhra Pradesh in the 1994 state assembly elections, winning the Kurnool constituency as a Communist Party of India (Marxist) candidate. He had unsuccessfully contested the seat in the 1989 elections. In the 2004 elections, he won the seat again, with T. G. Venkatesh of the Telugu Desam Party being his nearest rival. He lost to Venkatesh, who was now a candidate of the Indian National Congress, from the same constituency in the elections of 2009.
