= T. G. Venkatesh =

Indian businessman and politician

Tumbalam Gooty Venkatesh

Member of Parliament, Rajya Sabha
- In office 22 June 2016 – 21 June 2022
- Preceded by: Jairam Ramesh
- Succeeded by: Beeda Masthan Rao
- Constituency: Andhra Pradesh

Member of Legislative Assembly Andhra Pradesh
- In office 2009 - 2014
- Preceded by: M. Abdul Gafoor
- Succeeded by: Somula Venkat Reddy
- Constituency: Kurnool
- In office 1999 - 2004
- Preceded by: M. Abdul Gafoor
- Succeeded by: M. Abdul Gafoor
- Constituency: Kurnool

Personal details
- Party: Bharatiya Janata Party (2019-present)
- Other political affiliations: Telugu Desam Party (1990's-2004; 2014-2019); Indian National Congress (2004-2014)
- Children: T. G. Bharath

T. G. Venkatesh (born 16 May 1950) or Tumbalam Gooty Venkatesh is an Indian businessman and politician. He served as a Member of the Legislative Assembly (MLA) in the Legislative Assembly of Andhra Pradesh from 1999 to 2004 and from 2009 to 2014. He was Minister for Minor Irrigation under the administration of Kiran Kumar Reddy. He has been a member of the Rajya Sabha since 2016.

== Early life ==
Venkatesh was born to T. G. Gopal Setty and T. G. Gowramma on 16 May 1950 in Madanapalli, Chittoor district, Andhra Pradesh. He did his BCom from Sri Venkateswara University in Adoni. He married T. G. Swarajya Lakshmi Kumari on 22 February 1973. The couple have two daughters and a son, T. G. Bharath. Bharath contested as an MLA, through TDP, in the 2019 election and lost to Abdul Hafeez Khan from YSRCP. His nephew, T. G. Vishwa Prasad, is a prominent film producer in Telugu cinema and owns the production house, People Media Factory, in Hyderabad, Telangana.

== Business career ==
After having successfully started a caustic soda factory called Sree Rayalaseema Alkalies and Allied Chemicals, Venkatesh diversified into manufacturing high-strength calcium hypochlorite, power projects, wind power, manufacturing animal vaccines, large-scale salt producing units, movie theatres and star hotels, spread over Andhra Pradesh, Karnataka and Tamil Nadu.

He was for some time the chairman of the Andhra Pradesh State Trading Corporation.

== Political career ==
Venkatesh stood successfully in the Kurnool constituency as a Telugu Desam Party (TDP) candidate in the 1999 state assembly elections, with V. Rambhupal Chowdary of the Indian National Congress being his nearest rival. In the 2004 elections, standing in the same constituency for the same party, he came second to M. Abdul Gafoor of the Communist Party of India (Marxist). He joined the INC later that year and as a candidate for that party he beat Gafoor in the elections of 2009.

Objecting to the bifurcation of Andhra Pradesh, which would create a separate state of Telangana, Venkatesh switched his support back to the TDP in March 2014, following a path recently taken by several other prominent INC politicians. He again stood in Kurnool as a TDP candidate in 2014, finishing second to S. V. Mohan Reddy of the YSR Congress Party.

He has been a TDP member of the Rajya Sabha representing Andhra Pradesh since June 2016.

In 2013, while Minister for Minor Irrigation, Venkatesh promised to support the Arya Vysya community in Andhra Pradesh, suggesting that they had lost their way politically and that they needed to develop their trading capability.

In September 2017, Venkatesh suggested that Kancha Ilaiah was a traitor and should be hanged. He believed that Ilaiah's book, titled Samajika Smugglurlu Komatollu, should be banned as it incited both religious and caste-based hatred. In 2012, he had courted controversy by suggesting that under-performing members of the Indian Administrative Service (IAS) should be shot, which some people considered to be an incitement to murder. He subsequently claimed that it was a figure of speech and that he would retract it if IAS officers admitted their incompetence. On 20 June 2019 he joined BJP as TDP has lost in 2019 election.
