= Chinta Mohan =

Indian politician

Member of Parliament, Lok Sabha
- In office 2004–2014
- Preceded by: Nandipaku Venkataswamy
- Succeeded by: Varaprasad Rao Velagapalli
- Constituency: Tirupathi, Andhra Pradesh
- In office 1998–1999
- Preceded by: Nelavala Subrahmanyam
- Succeeded by: Nandipaku Venkataswamy
- Constituency: Tirupathi, Andhra Pradesh
- In office 1984–1996
- Preceded by: Thamburu Balakrishnaiah
- Succeeded by: Nelavala Subrahmanyam
- Constituency: Tirupathi, Andhra Pradesh

Personal details
- Born: 19 November 1954 Tirupati, Andhra Pradesh
- Party: Indian national congress
- Spouse: Revathi
- Children: 1 son and 1 daughter
- As of 12 May, 2006 Source: []

Chinta Mohan (born; 19 November 1954) was a member of the 14th Lok Sabha of India. He represented the Tirupathi constituency of Andhra Pradesh and is a member of the Indian National Congress.

== Electoral History ==
=== Lok Sabha ===
Year	Constituency	Party	Votes	%	Opponent	Party	Votes	%	Result	Margin	%
1984	Tirupati	TDP	318,467	52.89	Penchalaiah Pasala	INC	283,686	47.11	Won	+34,781	+5.78
1989	Tirupati	INC	406,057	54.36	M. Murugaiah	INC	333,557	44.66	Won	+72,500	+9.70
1991	Tirupati	INC	391,534	61.98	P. Subbaiah	INC	205,345	32.51	Won	+186,189	+29.47
1998	Tirupati	INC	288,904	38.52	Dr. N. Sivaprasad	INC	279,558	37.27	Won	+9,346	+1.25
1999	Tirupati	INC	373,981	47.31	Dr. N. Venkataswamy	INC	386,478	48.89	Lost	−12,497	−1.58
2004	Tirupati	INC	510,961	60.06	Dr. N. Venkata Swamy	INC	311,633	36.63	Won	+199,328	+23.43
2009	Tirupati	INC	428,403	40.36	Varla Ramaiah	INC	409,127	38.54	Won	+19,276	+1.82
2014	Tirupati	INC	33,333	2.74	Varaprasad Rao Velagapalli	YSRCP	580,376	47.79	Lost	−547,043	−45.05
2019	Tirupati	INC	24,039	1.83	Balli Durga Prasad Rao	YSRCP	722,877	54.91	Lost	−698,838	−53.08
2024	Tirupati	INC	65,523	4.80	Gurumoorthy Maddila	YSRCP	632,228	46.27	Lost	−566,705	−41.47

Preceded by Dr.N.Venkataswamy	Member of Parliament from Tirupati; 2004–2014	Succeeded by Varaprasad Rao Velagapalli
