= C. Dass =

Indian politician

C Dass

Member of the India Parliament for Tirupathi
- In office 1962–1971
- Preceded by: M. Ananthasayanam Ayyangar
- Succeeded by: Thamburu Balakrishniah

Personal details
- Born: 7 June 1922 Chalicheemala Palle, Chittoor District, British India
- Died: 20 January 2001 (aged 78)
- Party: Indian National Congress
- Profession: Politician

C. Dass (7 June 1922 – 20 January 2001) was an Indian politician of the Indian National Congress. He was member of the 3rd Lok Sabha (1962–1967) and the 4th Lok Sabha (1967–1970), from Tirupati. Dass was also a member of the Tirumala Tirupati Devasthanams from 1963 to 1966. He was predeceased by his wife, with whom he had three sons and two daughters. Dass died on 20 January 2001, at the age of 78.

== Positions held ==
- 1942–1952: Congress worker and Organiser, Charkha Sangham, Madanapalli.
- 1942: Took part in the 1942 Quit India movement and suffered imprisonment
- 1947: Took part in the liberation struggle of Mysore and led the second batch of Satyagrahis from Chittoor District
- General Secretary, Scheduled Castes and Scheduled Tribes Association, Madanapalli
- Member,
  - Panchayat Samiti, Madanapalli
  - Zilla Parishad, Chittoor
  - Andhra Pradesh Ryot-Kooli Sangham
  - Committee on eradication of untouchability and Economic and Educational Uplift of the Scheduled Castes, Government of India
  - Central Harijan Board, Government of India
- 1963–1966: Member, T.T. Devasthanam, Tirupati
- 1962–1967: Member, Third Lok Sabha
- 1967–1971: Member, Fourth Lok Sabha
