= Biyyapu Madhusudhan Reddy =

Indian politician

Biyyapu Madhusudhan Reddy (born 1970) is an Indian politician from Andhra Pradesh. He is an MLA from Srikalahasti Assembly constituency in Chittoor district. He won the 2019 Andhra Pradesh Legislative Assembly election representing YSR Congress Party. He has been nominated again by YSRCP to contest the 2024 Assembly election.

== Early life and education ==
Reddy was born in Srikalahasti to Biyyapu Govinda Reddy. He completed his intermediate, the pre university course in 1988.

== Career ==
Reddy started his political career with YSR Congress Party in 2014. He contested the 2014 Andhra Pradesh Legislative Assembly election but lost to Bojjala Gopala Krishna Reddy of Telugu Desam Party by a margin of 7,583 votes. He won the 2019 Andhra Pradesh Legislative Assembly election defeating Bojjala Reddy, this time around, by a margin of 38,141 votes.
