= M. A. Ayyangar =

Indian politician

Madabhushi Ananthasayanam Ayyangar
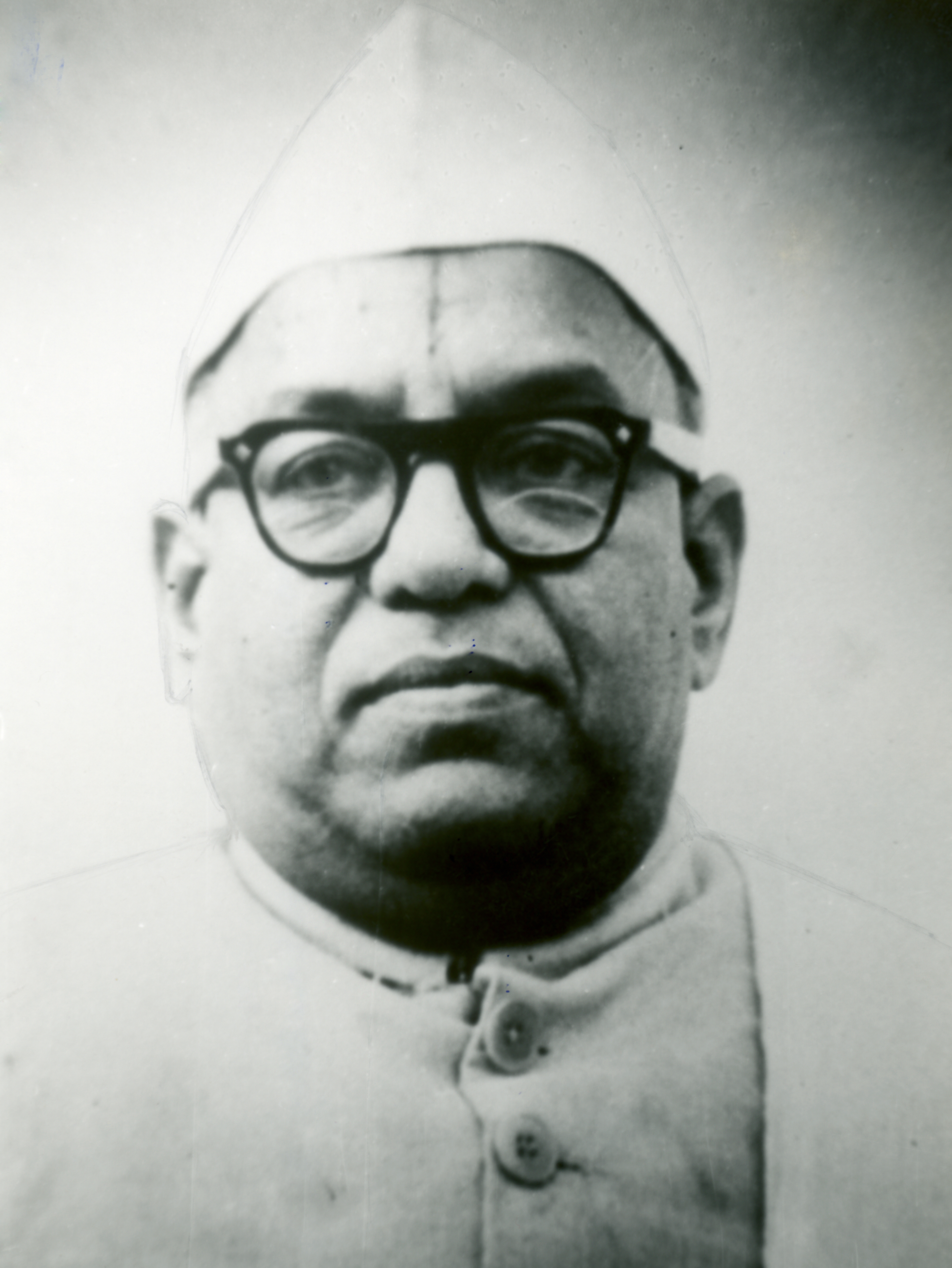

5th Governor of Bihar
- In office 12 May 1962 – 6 December 1967
- Chief Minister: Binodanand Jha; Krishna Ballabh Sahay; Mahamaya Prasad Sinha
- Preceded by: Zakir Husain
- Succeeded by: Nityanand Kanungo

2nd Speaker of the Lok Sabha
- In office 8 March 1956 – 16 April 1962
- Deputy: Sardar Hukam Singh
- Preceded by: Ganesh Vasudev Mavalankar
- Succeeded by: Sardar Hukam Singh

1st Deputy Speaker of the Lok Sabha
- In office 30 May 1952 – 7 March 1956
- Speaker: Ganesh Vasudev Mavalankar
- Preceded by: Office Established
- Succeeded by: Sardar Hukam Singh

Member of Parliament, Lok Sabha
- In office 1951–1962
- Preceded by: Constituency Established
- Succeeded by: C. Dass
- Constituency: Tirupathi

Personal details
- Born: 4 February 1891 Thiruchanoor, Madras Presidency, British India
- Died: 19 March 1978 (aged 87) Chittoor, Andhra Pradesh, India
- Party: Indian National Congress
- Spouse: Choodammal
- Children: 12
- Education: Pachaiyappa's College, Madras Law College
- Profession: Politician
- Known for: Second Speaker of the Lok Sabha

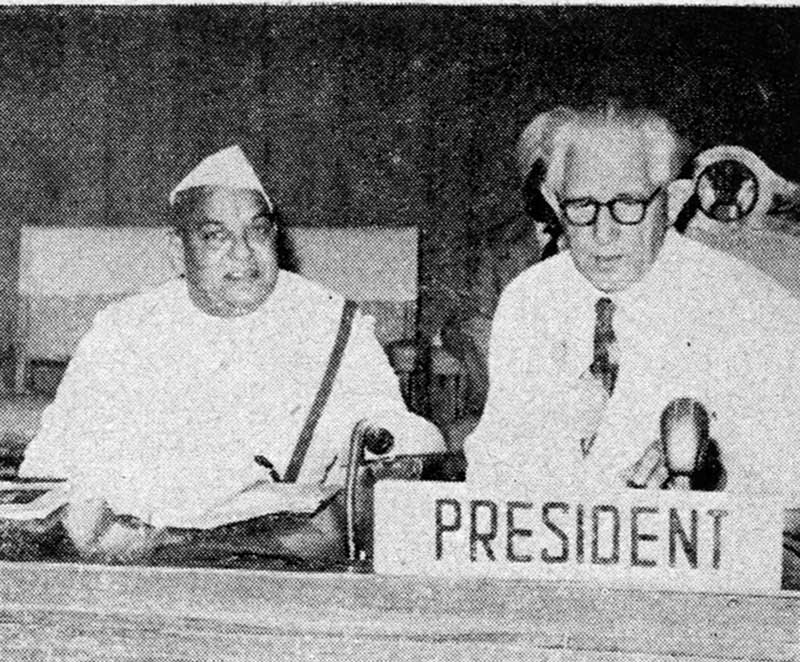
M. A. Ayyanagar and Oluf Egerod

Madabhushi Ananthasayanam Ayyangar (4 February 1891 – 19 March 1978) was the Second Speaker and before Deputy Speaker of the Lok Sabha in the Indian Parliament. He also served as the 5th Governor of Bihar.

== Early life and education ==
He was born in Thiruchanoor, Tirupati district of Madras Presidency, British India. He completed his early education from Devasthanam High School, Tirupati and the Pachiappa's College, Chennai. He obtained a law degree from Madras Law College in 1913.

== Early career ==
He was teacher in Mathematics and later became a lawyer between 1915 -1950. Inspired by Mahatma Gandhi he participated actively in Indian Freedom Struggle and was jailed twice.

== Political career ==
He was elected as member of Central Legislative Assembly in 1934. He was elected to the first Lok Sabha from Tirupathi and to the second Lok Sabha from Chittoor constituencies in 1952 and 1956 respectively.

He was elected in 1952 as the first Deputy Speaker of Lok Sabha with Ganesh Vasudev Mavalankar as the Speaker. After the death of Mavalankar in 1956, he was elected as Speaker of Lok Sabha. Dowry prohibition act 1961 was passed by joint session of parliament with M. A. Ayyangar as speaker. He worked as Governor of Bihar between 1962 and 1967.

== Later life and death ==
After his tenure as governor, Ayyanagar retired from politics and moved back to Tirupati.

== Legacy ==
A life size bronze statue of this celebrated statesman was erected at his hometown Tirupathi in 2007.

== Personal life ==
M. A. Ayyangar was born on 4 February 1891 in the village of Thiruchanur, near the world-famous temple town Tirupati, in Tirupati district. His father was M. Venkatavaradhachariar. M. A. Ayyangar worked as mathematics Teacher in Pachaiyappa's College at Esplanade, Chennai. Ayyangar married Choodammal in 1919, with whom he had four sons and eight daughters.
