= Sarvepalli Assembly constituency =

Constituency of the Andhra Pradesh Legislative Assembly, India

Coordinates: 14.29°N 79.97°E

Sarvepalli
- Constituency No. 119 for the Andhra Pradesh Legislative Assembly
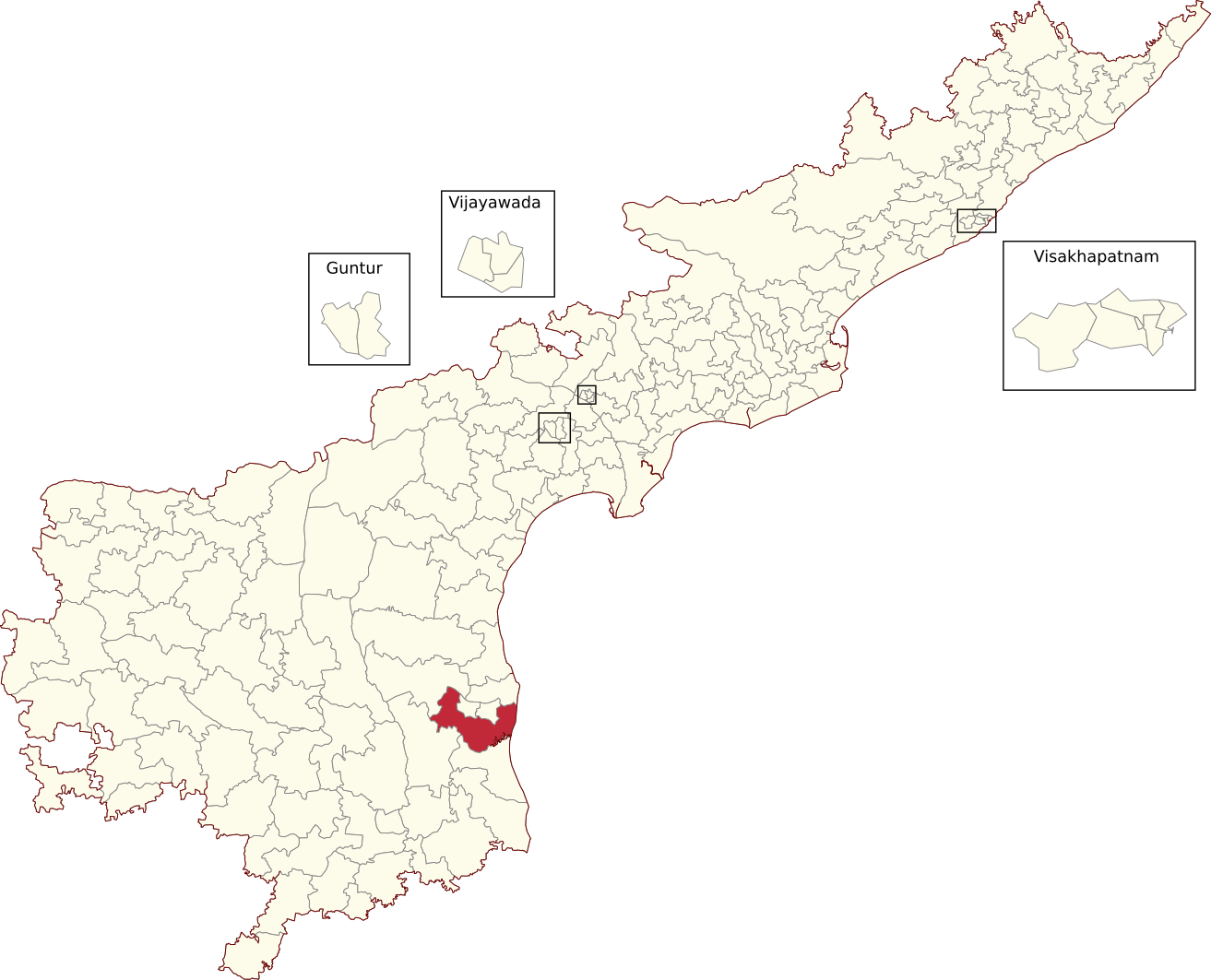
- Location of Sarvepalli Assembly constituency within Andhra Pradesh

Constituency details
- Country: India
- Region: South India
- State: Andhra Pradesh
- District: Nellore
- Lok Sabha constituency: Tirupati
- Established: 1955
- Total electors: 230,413
- Reservation: None

Member of Legislative Assembly
- 16th Andhra Pradesh Legislative Assembly
- Incumbent Somireddy Chandra Mohan Reddy
- Party: TDP
- Alliance: NDA
- Elected year: 2024

Sarvepalli Assembly constituency is a constituency in Nellore district of Andhra Pradesh that elects representatives to the Andhra Pradesh Legislative Assembly in India. It is one of the seven assembly segments of Tirupati Lok Sabha constituency.

Somireddy Chandra Mohan Reddy is the current MLA of the constituency, having won the 2024 Andhra Pradesh Legislative Assembly election from Telugu Desam Party. As of 2019, there are a total of 230,413 electors in the constituency. The constituency was established in 1955, as per the Delimitation Orders (1955).

== Mandals ==
Mandal
Podalakur
Thotapalligudur
Muthukur
Venkatachalam
Manubolu

ootukuru

== Members of the Legislative Assembly ==
Year	Member	Political party
1955	Bezawada Gopala Reddy	Indian National Congress
1955^	V. K. Reddy	Indian National Congress
1962	Vemareddy Venuku Reddy	Independent
1967	Vemaiah Swarna	Communist Party of India
1972	Mangalagiri Nanadas	Indian National Congress
1978	Chitturu Venkata Sesha Reddy	Indian National Congress
1983	Pechala Reddy Chenna Reddy	Telugu Desam Party
1985	Eduru Ramakrishna Reddy	Telugu Desam Party
1989	Chitturu Venkata Seshareddy Reddy	Indian National Congress
1994	Somireddy Chandra Mohan Reddy	Telugu Desam Party
1999	Somireddy Chandra Mohan Reddy	Telugu Desam Party
2004	Adala Prabhakara Reddy	Indian National Congress
2009	Adala Prabhakara Reddy	Indian National Congress
2014	Kakani Govardhan Reddy	YSR Congress Party
2019	Kakani Govardhan Reddy	YSR Congress Party
2024	Somireddy Chandra Mohan Reddy	Telugu Desam Party

^ indicates by-election

== Election results ==
=== 2024 ===
2024 Andhra Pradesh Legislative Assembly election: Sarvepalli
Party	Candidate	Votes	%	±%
TDP	Somireddy Chandra Mohan Reddy	103,278	52.77	
YSRCP	Kakani Govardhan Reddy	86,990	44.45	
INC	Chandrasekhar Poola	1,577	0.81	
NOTA	None Of The Above	2057	1.05	
Majority		16,288	8.32	
Turnout		1,95,716		
TDP gain from YSRCP		Swing		

=== 2019 ===
2019 Andhra Pradesh Legislative Assembly election: Sarvepalli
Party	Candidate	Votes	%	±%
YSRCP	Kakani Govardhan Reddy	97,272	51.36	
TDP	Somireddy Chandra Mohan Reddy	83,299	43.98	
Majority		13,973	8.62	
Turnout		189,392	88.41	+3.29
Registered electors		230,446		
YSRCP hold		Swing		

=== 2014 ===
2014 Andhra Pradesh Legislative Assembly election: Sarvepalli
Party	Candidate	Votes	%	±%
YSRCP	Kakani Govardhan Reddy	85,744	49	
TDP	Somireddy Chandra Mohan Reddy	80,298	46.29	
Majority		5,446	3.14	
Turnout		173,459	85.11	+5.35
Registered electors		203,818		
YSRCP gain from INC		Swing		

=== 2009 ===
2009 Andhra Pradesh Legislative Assembly election: Sarvepalli
Party	Candidate	Votes	%	±%
INC	Adala Prabhakara Reddy	73,760	47.30	−3.61
TDP	Somireddy Chandra Mohan Reddy	63,476	40.71	−4.47
PRP	Venkata Sesha Reddy Chittoor	11,553	7.41	
Majority		10,284	6.59	
Turnout		155,930	79.80	−1.30
Registered electors		195,412		
INC hold		Swing		

=== 2004 ===
2004 Andhra Pradesh Legislative Assembly election: Sarvepalli Sarvepalli
Party	Candidate	Votes	%	±%
INC	Adala Prabhakara Reddy	67,783	50.91	+10.81
TDP	Somireddy Chandra Mohan Reddy	60,158	45.18	−9.11
Majority		7,625	5.73	
Turnout		133,146	81.10	+10.37
Registered electors		164,184		
INC gain from TDP		Swing		

=== 1999 ===
1999 Andhra Pradesh Legislative Assembly election: Sarvepalli
Party	Candidate	Votes	%	±%
TDP	Somireddy Chandra Mohan Reddy	61,578	54.29%	
INC	Chitturu Venkata Sesha Reddy	45,486	40.10%	
Margin of victory		16,092	14.19%	
Turnout		116,000	72.33%	
Registered electors		160,375		
TDP hold		Swing		

=== 1994 ===
1994 Andhra Pradesh Legislative Assembly election: Sarvepalli
Party	Candidate	Votes	%	±%
TDP	Somireddy Chandra Mohan Reddy	68,855	62.79%	
INC	Chitturu Venkata Sesha Reddy	35,080	31.99%	
Margin of victory		33,775	30.80%	
Turnout		111,655	73.72%	
Registered electors		151,459		
TDP gain from INC		Swing		

=== 1989 ===
1989 Andhra Pradesh Legislative Assembly election: Sarvepalli Sarvepalli
Party	Candidate	Votes	%	±%
INC	Chitturu Venkata Sesha Reddy	54,796	54.63%	
TDP	Poondla Dasaratharami Reddy	41,648	41.52%	
Margin of victory		13,148	13.11%	
Turnout		103,871	69.73%	
Registered electors		148,962		
INC gain from TDP		Swing		

=== 1985 ===
1985 Andhra Pradesh Legislative Assembly election: Sarvepalli Sarvepalli
Party	Candidate	Votes	%	±%
TDP	Eduru Ramakrishna Reddy	50,423	60.75%	
INC	Kotamreddy Vijayakumar Reddy	28,857	34.76%	
Margin of victory		21,566	25.98%	
Turnout		83,006	65.14%	
Registered electors		129,340		
TDP hold		Swing		

=== 1983 ===
1983 Andhra Pradesh Legislative Assembly election: Sarvepalli
Party	Candidate	Votes	%	±%
TDP	Penchalareddy Chenna Reddy	42,918	55.44%	
INC	Chitturu Venkata Sesha Reddy	27,641	35.70%	
Margin of victory		15,277	19.73%	
Turnout		80,812	67.48%	
Registered electors		119,760		
TDP gain from INC(I)		Swing		

=== 1978 ===
1978 Andhra Pradesh Legislative Assembly election: Sarvepalli by
Party	Candidate	Votes	%	±%
INC(I)	Chitturu Venkata Sesha Reddy	43,851	51.11%	
JP	Anam Baktavatsala Reddy	21,889	35.51%	
INC	Gunupati Ramachandra Reddy	20,049	23.37%	
Margin of victory		21,962	25.60%	
Turnout		87,956	79.57%	
Registered electors		110,535		
INC(I) gain from INC		Swing		

=== 1972 ===
1972 Andhra Pradesh Legislative Assembly election: Sarvepalli Sarvepalli (SC)
Party	Candidate	Votes	%	±%
INC	Mangalagiri Nanadas	34,613	71.62%	
CPI	Vemaiah Swarna	11,311	23.41%	
Margin of victory		23,302	48.22%	
Turnout		49,310	52.75%	
Registered electors		93,483		
INC gain from CPI		Swing		

=== 1967 ===
1967 Andhra Pradesh Legislative Assembly election: Sarvepalli Sarvepalli (SC)
Party	Candidate	Votes	%	±%
CPI	Vemaiah Swarna	24,069	46.95%	
Independent	S R Jogi	23,803	46.43%	
Margin of victory		266	0.52%	
Turnout		53,523	65.75%	
Registered electors		81,407		
CPI gain from Independent		Swing		

=== 1962 ===
1962 Andhra Pradesh Legislative Assembly election: Sarvepalli
Party	Candidate	Votes	%	±%
Independent	Vemareddy Venku Reddy	23,441	50.09%	
INC	Vangallu Kodandarami Reddy	23,355	49.91%	
Margin of victory		86	0.18%	
Turnout		48,023	70.07%	
Registered electors		68,538		
Independent gain from INC		Swing		

=== 1955 ===
1955 Andhra State Legislative Assembly election: Sarvepalli
Party	Candidate	Votes	%	±%
INC	Bezawada Gopala Reddy	25,582	67.92%	
CPI	Koduru Balakota Reddy	10,942	29.05%	
Margin of victory		14,640	38.87%	
Turnout		37,663	62.67%	
Registered electors		60,095		
INC win (new seat)				

== See also ==
- List of constituencies of Andhra Pradesh Legislative Assembly
