= Nelavala Vijayasree =

Indian politician

Member of the Andhra Pradesh Legislative Assembly
- Incumbent
- Assumed office 2024
- Preceded by: Sanjeevaiah Kiliveti
- Constituency: Sullurpeta

Personal details
- Party: Telugu Desam Party

Nelavala Vijayasree (born 1987) is an Indian politician from Andhra Pradesh. She is an First Lady MLA from Sullurpeta Assembly Constituency which is reserved for SC community in Tirupati District. She won the 2024 Andhra Pradesh Legislative Assembly election representing Telugu Desam Party.

== Early life and education ==
Vijayasree is from Nellore. She completed MBBS in 2022 from Narayana Medical College, Nellore which is affiliated with Dr. NTR University of Health Sciences.

== Political career ==
Vijayasree won the 2024 Andhra Pradesh Legislative Assembly election from Sullurpeta Assembly Constituency representing Telugu Desam Party. She polled 1,11,048 votes and defeated Kiliveti Sanjeevaiah of YSR Congress Party by a margin of 29,115 votes.
