= Sarvepalli =

- village
- Interactive map of Sarvepalli
- Location in Andhra Pradesh, India Sarvepalli (India)
- Coordinates: 14.291728°N 79.973752°E
- Country: India
- State: Andhra Pradesh

Languages
  - Official: Telugu
- Time zone: UTC+5:30 (IST)

Sarvepalli is a village in Nellore district of Andhra Pradesh, India and famous for being the ancestral village of former Indian President Sarvepalli Radhakrishnan.

== Assembly constituency ==
Sarvepalli is an assembly constituency in Andhra Pradesh.

List of Elected Members:

- 1955 - Vangallu Kodandarami Reddy
- 1962 - V Venku Reddy
- 1967 - Swarna Vemiah
- 1972 - Mangalagiri Nanadas
- 1983 - Pechalareddy Chenna Reddy
- 1978 - Chitturu Venkata Sesha Reddy
- 1985 - Eduru Ramakrishna Reddy
- 1989 - Chitturu Venkata Sesha Reddy
- 1994 - Somireddy Chandra Mohana Reddy - TDP
- 1999 - Somireddy Chandra Mohana Reddy - TDP
- 2004 - Adala Prabhakar Reddy - Congress
- 2009 - Adala Prabhakar Reddy - Congress
- 2014 - Kakani Govardhan Reddy - YSRCP
