= Pasam Sunil Kumar =

Indian politician

Member of the Andhra Pradesh Legislative Assembly
- Incumbent
- Assumed office 2024
- Preceded by: Meriga Muralidhar
- Constituency: Gudur

Personal details
- Party: Telugu Desam Party

Pasam Sunil Kumar (born 1969) is an Indian politician from Andhra Pradesh. He is an MLA from Gudur Assembly constituency, which is reserved for SC community in Nellore district. He represents Telugu Desam Party. He won the 2024 Andhra Pradesh Legislative Assembly election where TDP had an alliance with BJP and JSP.

== Early life and education ==
Kumar is from Gudur, Tirupati district. His late father Pasam Penchalaiah was a farmer. He completed his M.A. in 1992 at Sri Venkateswara University, Tirupati.

== Political career ==
Kumar won the 2024 Andhra Pradesh Legislative Assembly election from Gudur Assembly constituency representing TDP. He polled 1,02,675 votes and defeated Meruga Murali of YSR Congress Party by a margin of 21,192 votes.
