= Balli Durga Prasad Rao =

Indian politician (1956–2020)

Member of Parliament, Lok Sabha
- In office 2019-16 September 2020
- Preceded by: Varaprasad Rao Velagapalli
- Succeeded by: Maddila Gurumoorthy
- Constituency: Tirupati

Member of the Andhra Pradesh Legislative Assembly
- In office 2009-2014
- Preceded by: Patra Prakasa Rao
- Succeeded by: Pasim Sunil Kumar
- Constituency: Gudur
- In office 1994-2004
- Preceded by: Patra Prakasa Rao
- Succeeded by: Patra Prakasa Rao
- Constituency: Gudur
- In office 1985-1989
- Preceded by: Balli Durga Prasad
- Succeeded by: Patta Prakash Rao
- Constituency: Gudur

Personal details
- Born: 15 June 1956
- Died: 16 September 2020 (aged 64)
- Party: YSR Congress Party
- Other political affiliations: Telugu Desam Party
- Spouse: B. Saralamma
- Children: Balli Kalyanachakravarthy

Balli Durga Prasad Rao (15 June 1956 – 16 September 2020) was an Indian politician.

== Biography ==
He was elected to the Lok Sabha, lower house of the Parliament of India from Tirupati, Andhra Pradesh in the 2019 Indian general election as a member of the YSR Congress Party.

Balli Durga Prasad Rao was elected as Telugu Desam Party MLA from Gudur Assembly constituency, Andhra Pradesh. He served as MLA from 1985 to 1989, 1994–1999, 1999-2004 & 2009-2014 (4 terms). He also served as Minister for Primary Education from 1996 to 1998 in the Nara chandra babu Naidu first Cabinet. He became MLA at the age of 28 years. He served as Member of PAC, Andhra Pradesh (2009-2014). He joined YSRCP in 2019.

In September 2020, Prasad Rao tested positive for COVID-19 during the COVID-19 pandemic in India and he was hospitalized at a hospital in Chennai. He suffered cardiac arrest on 16 September and was pronounced dead.

In 2021, his son, Balli Kalyanachakravarthy, was elected to the Andhra Pradesh Legislative Council.

Lok Sabha
Preceded by Varaprasad Rao Velagapalli	Member of Parliament for Tirupati; 2019 – 2020	Succeeded by Maddila Gurumoorthy
