= Kurnool Assembly constituency =

Constituency of the Andhra Pradesh Legislative Assembly, India

Coordinates: 15.81°N 78.04°E

Kurnool
- Constituency No. 137 for the Andhra Pradesh Legislative Assembly
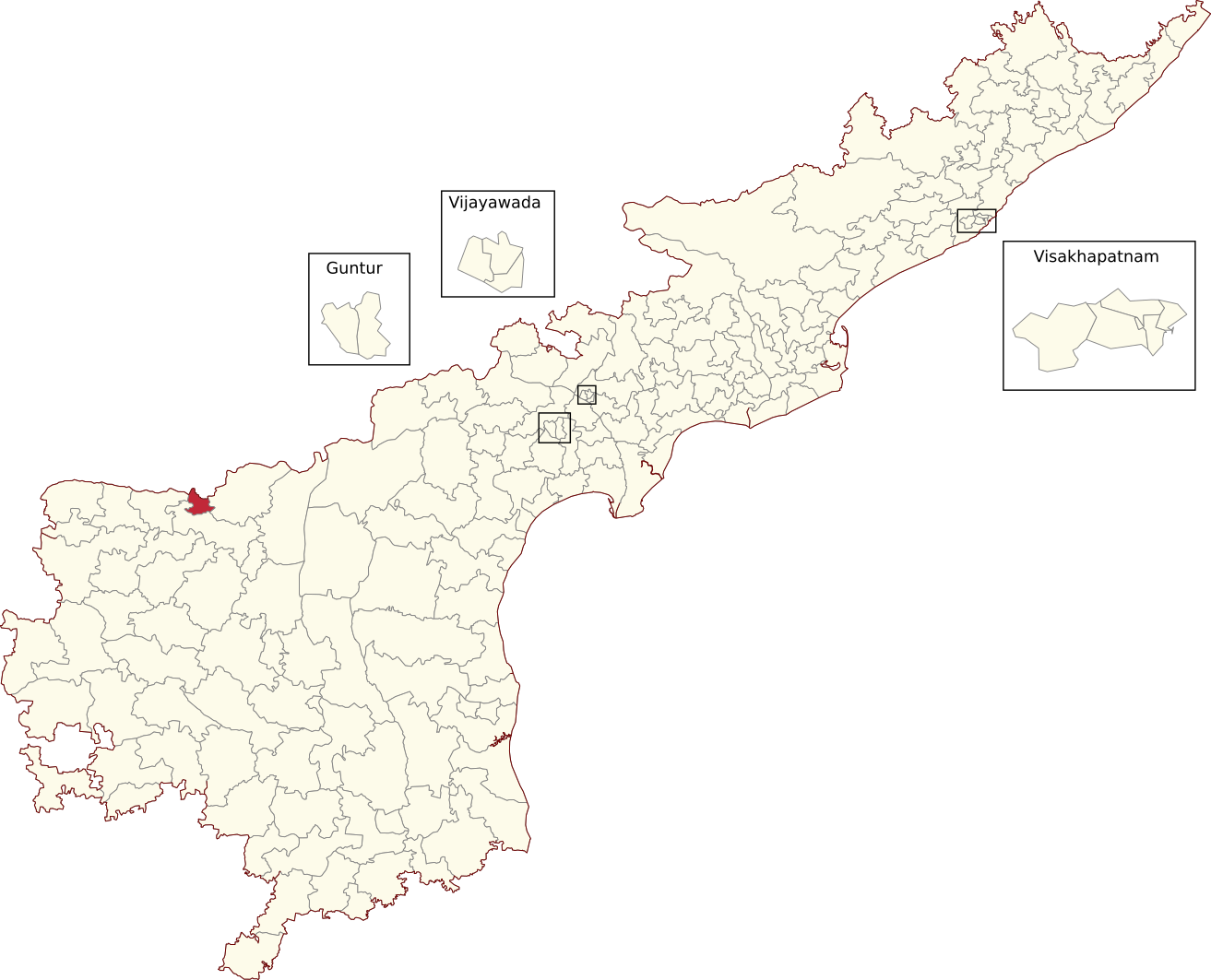
- Location of Kurnool Assembly constituency within Andhra Pradesh

Constituency details
- Country: India
- Region: South India
- State: Andhra Pradesh
- District: Kurnool
- Lok Sabha constituency: Kurnool
- Established: 1951
- Total electors: 258,815
- Reservation: None

Member of Legislative Assembly
- 16th Andhra Pradesh Legislative Assembly
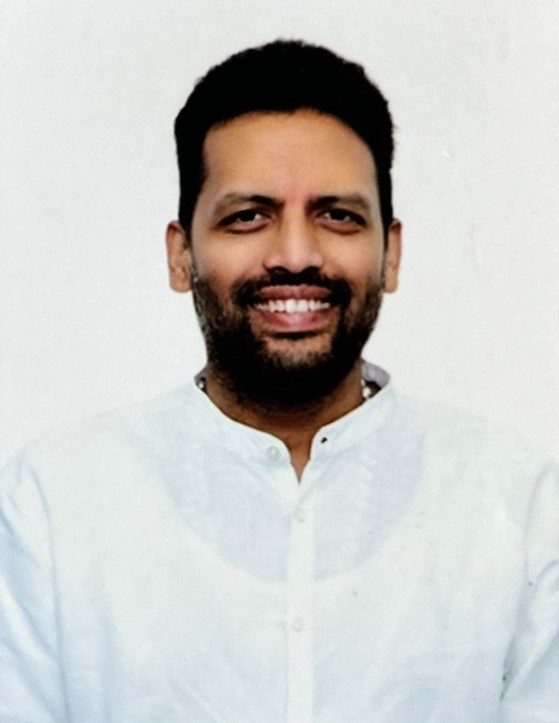
- Incumbent T. G. Bharath
- Party: TDP
- Alliance: NDA
- Elected year: 2024

Kurnool Assembly constituency is a constituency in Kurnool district of Andhra Pradesh that elects representatives to the Andhra Pradesh Legislative Assembly in India. It is one of the seven assembly segments of Kurnool Lok Sabha constituency.

T. G. Bharath is the current MLA of the constituency, having won the 2024 Andhra Pradesh Legislative Assembly election from Telugu Desam Party. As of 25 April 2024, there are a total of 258,815 electors in the constituency. The constituency was established in 1951, as per the Delimitation Orders (1951).

== Members of the Legislative Assembly ==
Year	Member	Political party
1952	Damodaram Sanjivayya	Indian National Congress
1955	Mahaboob Ali Khan	Indian National Congress
1962	T.K.R. Sarma	Independent
1967	K. E. Madanna	Indian National Congress
1972	P. Rahiman Khan	Indian National Congress
1978	Mohammad Ibrahim Khan	Indian National Congress
1983	V. Rama Bhupal Chowdry	Telugu Desam Party
1985	V. Rama Bhupal Chowdry	Indian National Congress
1989	V. Rama Bhupal Chowdry	Indian National Congress
1994	M. Abdul Gafoor	Communist Party of India (Marxist)
1999	T. G. Venkatesh	Telugu Desam Party
2004	M. Abdul Gafoor	Communist Party of India (Marxist)
2009	T. G. Venkatesh	Indian National Congress
2014	Somula Venkat Mohan Reddy	YSR Congress Party
2019	Abdul Hafeez Khan	YSR Congress Party
2024	T. G. Bharath	Telugu Desam Party

== Election results ==
=== 1952 ===
1952 Madras Legislative Assembly election: Kurnool
Party	Candidate	Votes	%	±%
INC	D. Sanjeevayya	24,526	19.06	19.06
INC	Sankara Reddi, N.	23,467	18.23	18.23
Independent	Venkata Reddi, K.	20,643	16.04	
Independent	Sankarayya, S.	19,286	14.98	
Socialist Party (India)	Ramachandra Sarma, Darnam	19,019	14.78	
Independent	Anjanayya	7,698	5.98	
KMPP	Nagappa, S.	5,038	3.91	
KLP	Issaq, A. R.	4,725	3.67	
KLP	Hussainappa M	4,306	3.35	
Margin of victory		1,059	0.82	
Turnout		1,28,708	84.96	
Registered electors		1,51,490		
INC win (new seat)				

=== 2004 ===
2004 Andhra Pradesh Legislative Assembly election: Kurnool
Party	Candidate	Votes	%	±%
CPI(M)	M. Abdul Gafoor	54,125	39.06	+16.78
TDP	T. G. Venkatesh	51,652	37.27	−6.45
Independent	D. Vishnuvardhan Reddy	26,104	18.84	
Majority		2,473	1.69	
Turnout		135,876	53.13	−3.19
CPI(M) gain from TDP		Swing		

=== 2009 ===
2009 Andhra Pradesh Legislative Assembly election: Kurnool
Party	Candidate	Votes	%	±%
INC	T. G. Venkatesh	68,467	61.28	+24.01
CPI(M)	M. Abdul Gafoor	24,400	21.84	−17.22
PRP	Yennam Rajasekhar Reddy	12,013	10.75	
Majority		44,067	39.44	
Turnout		111,726	52.82	−0.31
INC gain from CPI(M)		Swing		

=== 2014 ===
2014 Andhra Pradesh Legislative Assembly election: Kurnool
Party	Candidate	Votes	%	±%
YSRCP	S. V. Mohan Reddy	57,962	40.18	
TDP	T. G. Venkatesh	54,483	37.77	
Majority		3,479	2.41	
Turnout		144,245	63.34	+10.52
YSRCP gain from TDP		Swing		

=== 2019 ===
2019 Andhra Pradesh Legislative Assembly election: Kurnool
Party	Candidate	Votes	%	±%
YSRCP	Abdul Hafeez Khan	72,819	47.70	
TDP	T. G. Bharath	67,466	44.19	
Majority		5,353	3.51	
Turnout		1,52,659		
YSRCP hold		Swing		

=== 2024 ===
2024 Andhra Pradesh Legislative Assembly election: Kurnool
Party	Candidate	Votes	%	±%
TDP	T. G. Bharath	91,690	51.34	
YSRCP	A. Md. Imtiaz	72,814	40.77	
INC	Shaik Jelani Basha	9,022	5.05	
NOTA	None Of The Above	718	0.4	
Majority		18,876	10.57	
Turnout		1,78,594		
TDP gain from YSRCP		Swing		

== See also ==
- List of constituencies of Andhra Pradesh Legislative Assembly
