= Velagapalli Varaprasad Rao =

Indian politician

Member of parliament for Tirupati
- In office 26 May 2014 – 24 May 2019
- Preceded by: Chinta Mohan
- Succeeded by: Balli Durga Prasad Rao
- Constituency: Tirupati

Personal details
- Born: 15 May 1953 (age 73) Kommalmudi, Krishna, Andhra Pradesh
- Party: Bharatiya Janata Party
- Spouse: Velagapalli Lakshmi
- Children: 2
- Education: Andhra University
- Occupation: Biochemist, GH Pondicherry (1978–1980); Assistant Administrative Officer, National Insurance (1980–1982); Reserve Bank of India (1982–1983); and IAS (1983–2009)
- As of 31 March, 2024

Velagapalli Varaprasada Rao is an Indian politician and was a Member of Parliament of the 16th Lok Sabha from Tirupati (Lok Sabha constituency), Andhra Pradesh. He won the Indian general election, 2014 being a Yuvajana Sramika Rythu Congress Party candidate.

Rao was born on 15 May 1953. He was an Indian Administrative Service (IAS) officer from the 1983 batch of the Tamilnadu Cadre. During his tenure in the civil services, he held several top positions, including that of Principal Secretary to Government of Tamil Nadu, Chennai. In 2009, he opted for voluntary retirement to enter politics and serve the people of his native state, Andhra Pradesh.

In 2019 assembly election, Rao was elected as an MLA for Gudur Constituency in Andhra Pradesh (AP), representing the YSRCP party. Formerly, he was an MP from the Tirupati Constituency. He resigned from this post last year as the Central Government denied special category status to AP.

V Varaprasad Rao quit YSRCP on 24 March 2024, joined the BJP in New Delhi. He was shortly announced as the Bharatiya Janata Party candidate from the Tirupati Constituency for the 2024 Lok Sabha Elections.

== Education ==
After completing his undergraduate course (B.Sc.) in botany/zoology at Noble College, Machilipatnam, Rao pursued a post-graduate course in biochemistry from Andhra University, Vizag. He then went on to complete his Ph.D. in biochemistry from the same university.

During his IAS tenure, Rao has also completed a one-year program in administration in the UK.

== Career ==
Before joining the Indian Administrative Services, Rao worked in myriad roles:

Year	Role	Company/place
1978–1980	Biochemist	General Hospital, Govt. of Pondicherry
1980–1982	Branch Manager	National Insurance Company
1982–1983	Assistant Currency Officer	Reserve Bank of India

Over the course of his 24 year stint (1983–2007) in the IAS, Dr. Varaprasada Rao worked in various capacities and held several prominent posts in departments such as Information and Tourism, Small Industries and Industries and Education. As Managing Director, he was pivotal in turning around the losses of many companies and putting them back on course. For instance, The state owned Co-optex (Textiles) was in a financial crisis and operating at a loss of around Rs.80 crores until he took over the reins and turned around the fortunes and generated profits.

Similarly, when he was appointed the Managing Director of Salt Corporation, he had a challenging role to play. The corporation was in the doldrums and on the brink of closure. Dr. Varaprasada Rao — with his foresight and progressive policies — saved the company from the brink of collapse.

== Important posts held in IAS Cadre ==
1. Sub Collector and District Collector – Kanchipuram/Tiruvallur & Pudukottai districts
2. State Protocol Officer, Government of Tamil Nadu
3. On deputation to Department of Atomic Energy
4. Commissioner of
  1. Tourism Department
  2. Labour Department
  3. SC/ST Welfare Department
  4. Land Administration Department (additional)
  5. Land Reforms Department
5. Chairman and/or Managing Director of
  1. Pumpuhar Shipping Corporation
  2. Tourism Development Corporation
  3. Explosives Corporation
  4. Co-optex (Textiles)
  5. Tansi (Small Industries)
  6. Tamilnadu Slum Clearance Board

After quitting the IAS, Dr Varaprasada Rao was the CEO of 7 Hills Hospital in Andheri (E), Mumbai. Here, he played a major role in expanding the facilities to a 1500-bed hospital.

== Personal life ==
Dr. V. Varaprasada Rao, is the son of Mr. V. Chiranjeevulu who served as Village President, Pasarlapudi Village. Chiranjeevulu was also Member, Panchayat Union and Member, Zilla Parishad, Krishna District in Andhra Pradesh. Dr. V.Varaprasada Rao is married to K. Lakshmi M.Sc., Retd. Senior Manager, Bank Of Baroda.

They have a son - Mr. Naveen Gupta, MBA, IIM (A) who is self-employed and is running Health Clinics and Schools in Chennai. His daughter Dr. Spoorthi, MD(ABIM), FACP returned from USA after 18 years. She is self-employed and runs a hospital.

== Social work ==
Dr Varaprasada Rao was always driven to work for the cause of humanity. After his voluntary retirement from the IAS, Dr Varaprasada Rao dedicated his time to community and social service. He spearheaded and initiated several projects for the welfare of the economically underprivileged.

1. In 2012, he donated Rs.15 lakhs for constructing a building in Noble College, Machilipatinam, Andhra Pradesh, his alma mater.
2. Constructed an elementary school building at a cost of Rs. 4.00 lakhs at his native place in Kommalamudi Village, Krishna District, Andhra Pradesh. The school is currently run by the Government.
3. Donated Rs. 50,000/- each for the refurbishment of worshipping places/community centers/statues at the following places.
  1. Gunnanapudi, Krishna District
  2. Lellapudi, Krishna District
  3. Golvepalli, Krishna District
  4. Chintalapudi, Krishna District
  5. Moturu, Krishna District
  6. Gudivada Community Centre, Krishna District
  7. Gudivada Church, Krishna District
  8. Akiveedu Church, Krishna District
4. Conducted and funded 6 marriages in the last two years at a cost of about Rs. 2.00 Lakhs
5. Currently he is supporting the education of three poor boys and one poor girl who are pursuing Engineering, B.Com., Plus 2 and 5th standard respectively.
6. He also adopted a minor boy who was condemned to life-imprisonment. He reformed him completely and gave him a life of dignity. The boy is now a young man of 30 years who has joined the mainstream of life—married with a family.
7. He has helped hundreds of students from different communities coming from various socially and economically weak backgrounds to get a decent education and respectful jobs.

== Political background ==
After taking a voluntary retirement from the IAS, Dr. Varaprasada Rao decided to take a plunge into politics. The Praja Rajyam Party (PRP) headed by Mr. Chiranjeevi offered him an M.P. seat from Tirupati along with a position of Vice-President of the party. He contested the 2009 general elections and lost. The PRP has now merged with the Congress Party.

During his association with PRP as Vice President, he was actively involved with the drafting of the Party Manifesto. Most of his views on the welfare of weaker sections, women and minorities were incorporated into the manifesto.

Dr Varaprasada Rao also undertook a Praja Sankalpa Yatra, along with the YSR Congress Party Chief YS Jagan Mohan Reddy. This padayatra, a mass outreach program which covered the length and breadth of the state, had an unprecedented public turnout where the leaders interacted with 1.25 crore people.

He also went on an indefinite hunger strike at Andhra Pradesh Bhavan over the demand of special category status to Andhra Pradesh. He fell ill during the fast and was admitted to the hospital, after which the fast was broken.

Dr. Rao has raised his concern over several issues in parliamentary sessions and debated strongly in support of dalits and women's causes. He has also been strongly campaigning to set up a port in Dugarajapatnam in Nellore district.

== Electoral History ==
=== Lok Sabha ===
Year	Constituency	Party	Votes	%	Opponent	Party	Votes	%	Result	Margin	%
2009	Tirupati	PRP	1,71,638	16.17	Chinta Mohan	INC	4,28,403	40.36	Lost	-2,56,765	-24.19
2014	Tirupati	YCP	5,80,376	47.79	Karumanchi Jayaram	BJP	5,42,951	44.71	Won	+37,425	+3.08
2024	Tirupati	BJP	6,17,659	45.20	Gurumoorthy Maddila	YCP	6,32,228	46.27	Lost	-14,569	-1.07
