= Kiliveti Sanjeevaiah =

Indian politician

Kiliveti Sanjeevaiah (born 1964) is an Indian politician from Andhra Pradesh. He is an MLA of the YSR Congress Party from the Sullurpeta Assembly Constituency which is reserved for SC community in the erstwhile Nellore District, presently in Tirupati district. He won the 2019 Andhra Pradesh Legislative Assembly election. He was nominated again to contest the 2024 Assembly election from Sullurpeta Constituency despite differences within the party.

== Early life and education ==
He was born in Kadaluru village, Tada Mandal, Nellore District. He did his B.Tech. in Civil Engineering from NBKR IST, Vidyanagar, SPSR Nellore, presently Tirupati district, affiliated with SV University in 1989.

== Career ==
He began his political journey with the YSR Congress Party. He won the 2014 Andhra Pradesh Legislative Assembly election defeating Parasa Venkata Rathnaiah of Telugu Desam Party by a margin of 3,726 votes. He won again in the 2019 Andhra Pradesh Legislative Assembly election defeating Parasa Venkata Rathnaiah of TDP by a huge margin of 61,292 votes. He is credited with a lot of developmental works in the district.
