= S. C. V. Naidu =

Indian politician

S. C. V. Naidu served as the Member of the Legislative Assembly for Srikalahasti constituency in Andhra Pradesh, India, between 2004 and 2009. He represented the Indian National Congress.

His parents are Chenchu Papa Naidu, Gnanamma. He studied B.Com. in Srikalahasti government degree college. In 2004, he moved to Congress party and contested against Gopalakrishna Reddy and defeated him in congress wave. Later in 2009 elections, he got defeated by the same opponent. In 2014 he did not contest.
