= Abdul Hafeez Khan =

Indian politician

Member of the Andhra Pradesh Legislative Assembly
- In office 2019–2024
- Preceded by: S. V. Mohan Reddy
- Succeeded by: T. G. Bharath
- Constituency: Kurnool

Personal details
- Party: YSR Congress Party
- Occupation: Politician

Mohammed Abdul Hafeez Khan is an Indian politician from Andhra Pradesh. He has been a member of the YSR Congress Party since 2011 and represented Kurnool Constituency in 2019 as a member of legislative assembly. He won the 2019 Andhra Pradesh election and served in office from 2019 to 2024.

== Early life and education ==
Hafeez Khan was born in Kurnool, Andhra Pradesh on January 31, 1977. He finished his secondary education in Montessori School and his intermediate, the pre university course, from Osmania College. Later, he did bachelor's in Civil Engineering from Muffakham Jah College of Engineering and Technology and a Master's in Computer Information Systems from University of Detroit Mercy. He graduated in the year of 2003 and continued working in the software industry in the USA till 2011.

== Political career ==
Hafeez Khan joined as a district steering committee member of YSRCP in 2011 and then became the convenor of the District Minority Committee in 2012. Later, he served as a central executive council member in 2013. In 2016, he became the Assembly Incharge. He was made the Additional Special Representative from Andhra Pradesh to the Middle East and Far East Countries for business development and investments in 2021.

He became an MLA for the first time, winning the 2019 Andhra Pradesh Legislative Assembly Election, defeating T. G. Bharath of the Telugu Desam Party by a margin of 5,353 votes. He polled 72,819 votes, representing a 47.70% share of the votes in the constituency.

=== Service during the Covid-19 Pandemic ===
Performing last rites
Hafeez Khan became the first Member of the Legislative Assembly (MLA) in India to personally perform the funeral rites of a COVID-19 victim. In doing so, he challenged societal taboos and stepped forward when the community was apprehensive about the virus. Khan also successfully advocated for the reopening of local graveyards, allowing families to conduct proper last rites, despite initial opposition. His efforts helped reduce the stigma surrounding the death of COVID-19 victims. Additionally, Khan founded the 'HK Team,' a volunteer group composed of young individuals, to carry out free funeral services for COVID-19 victims, ensuring that the rituals were conducted with respect and in accordance with religious customs. This initiative allowed the deceased to receive dignified last rites, even in cases where family members couldn't be present.

Covid care center and Oxygen center
Amid the second wave of the COVID-19 pandemic, Hafeez Khan established the Jagananna COVID Care Centre equipped with 300 oxygen concentrators. This provided critical oxygen support to patients, alleviating the shortage of oxygen supplies and preventing hospital overcrowding. He also set up an Oxygen Bank, providing concentrators to COVID-19 patients at home to ensure they received necessary oxygen therapy without hospitalisation. Khan personally coordinated with contacts in the United States to secure the medical supplies mentioned above, which were critical during the crisis. The Oxygen Bank continues to operate even today.

Increasing Ambulance availability
During the peak of the COVID-19 crisis, ambulance charges skyrocketed, leaving many families struggling to afford transport to hospitals. In response, Khan launched a free ambulance service, funded entirely from his personal resources. This unique initiative came as a lifeline to the community, providing essential, no-cost transportation when ambulance services were both scarce and prohibitively expensive.

He also played a pivotal role in ensuring smooth medical transport between Andhra Pradesh and Telangana and personally intervened with Telangana state police officials to prevent the unnecessary stoppage of ambulances traveling to Hyderabad from Andhra Pradesh.

Covid Warrior Award
Hafeez Khan was honored with the COVID Warrior Award, making him the only politician from both Andhra Pradesh and Telangana to receive such recognition. His efforts during the pandemic, including setting up the COVID Care Centre, free ambulance services, and the Oxygen Bank, earned him accolades for going above and beyond in serving his community.

=== Development of Kurnool ===
During his tenure, Hafeez Khan introduced and oversaw various initiatives across multiple sectors.

The Hyderabad Bangalore Industrial Corridor
Hafeez Khan played a key role in the development of the Hyderabad Bangalore Industrial Corridor, pioneering the concept and formally pitching it to Y.S Jagan Mohan Reddy who then took it to the next level. Kurnool is a key part of this corridor and this proposal aimed to boost economic growth, attract investment, and improve infrastructure in the region.

In education, he spearheaded the Nadu Nedu Schools program to modernize and upgrade schools, established a Cluster University to expand access to higher education, and creation of the National Law University was approved and commenced during his term.

In the field of irrigation, he oversaw major projects such as implementing a significant pipeline from Sunkesula to Kurnool (which proved to be highly beneficial for the city), increasing water pipeline capacity in wards and constructing a water treatment plant. Incremental projects like provision of new water tap connections in all wards and installation of water boosters for improved access and pressure were also taken care of.

Urban development was a significant focus during his tenure, marked by projects such as the construction of a new KMC municipal building, multiple flyovers, road expansions like Joharapuram Road and Anand Takies Road, and landmarks like the Khana Khazana Bridge.
The beautification of Kondareddy Burju (an extremely prominent monument of Kurnool) was brought to life through the establishment of a park, a laser show, and sound effects. Further efforts of livening up the city included the creation of Global Glow Garden Park and enhancement of public spaces like Rajvihar Centre, C-Camp Center and Gayatri Estate Circle. Local temples were also restored and enhanced as part of the beautification efforts.
He also introduced initiatives like the Jagananna Mahila Mart to support women entrepreneurs and developed Smart Roads for traffic efficiency, alongside ambitious projects like an IT hub to promote economic growth. A community hall was constructed for scheduled castes along with Sachivalayam (government service center) establishments. To aid river worship, permanent structures were developed at Pushkara Ghats.

In electricity, his administration facilitated the installation of new electric poles, upgrades to current wires and high-tension power lines and installation of energy-efficient LED streetlights. Security and upgradation of APSEB transformer stations were also seen alongside capacity enhancements for transformers to meet growing demand.

In healthcare, he established 12 Urban Health Centres, a Cancer Hospital, and facilities like a Critical Care Unit, Diagnostic Center, and modern equipment such as MRI and ultrasound machines in the government hospital.

Judicial reforms under his administration led to the establishment of a Human Rights Commission (a body to safeguard human rights), Lokayukta (an anti-corruption ombudsman) and a Waqf Tribunal (judicial body for Waqf related problems).

Sports infrastructure underwent notable upgrades during his tenure, with the establishment of various facilities like a new basketball court, skating rink, tennis academy, cricket academy, and an indoor stadium.

Environmental contributions include the Greenko Energy Project, which is the world’s largest and first-of-its-kind single location, integrated renewable energy storage project and was only made possible with an investment of 3 billion dollars. This project aims to reduce 15 million tonnes of CO_{2} emissions every year and was initiated in his tenure by CM Jagan Mohan Reddy.
