= Srikalahasti Assembly constituency =

Constituency of the Andhra Pradesh Legislative Assembly, India

Coordinates: 13.75°N 79.71°E

Srikalahasti
- Constituency No. 168 for the Andhra Pradesh Legislative Assembly
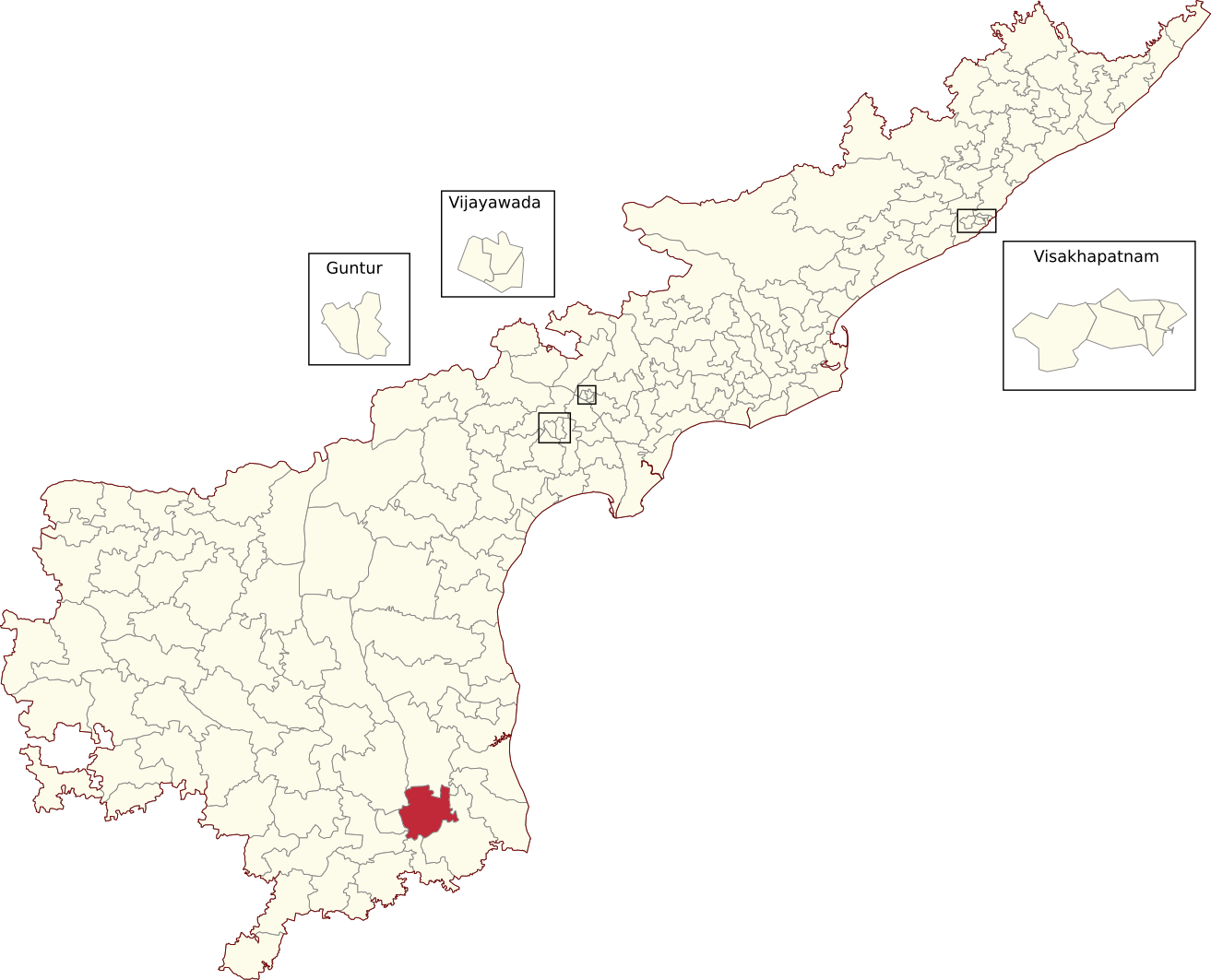
- Location of Srikalahasti Assembly constituency within Andhra Pradesh

Constituency details
- Country: India
- Region: South India
- State: Andhra Pradesh
- District: Tirupati
- Lok Sabha constituency: Tirupati
- Established: 1951
- Total electors: 237,666
- Reservation: None

Member of Legislative Assembly
- 16th Andhra Pradesh Legislative Assembly
- Incumbent Bojjala Sudhir Reddy
- Party: TDP
- Alliance: NDA
- Elected year: 2024

Srikalahasti Assembly constituency is a constituency in Tirupati district of Andhra Pradesh that elects represtatives to the Andhra Pradesh Legislative Assembly in India. It is one of the seven assembly segments of Tirupati Lok Sabha constituency.

Bojjala Sudhir Reddy is the current MLA of the constituency, having won the 2024 Andhra Pradesh Legislative Assembly election from Telugu Desam Party. As of 2019, there are a total of 237,666 electors in the constituency. The constituency was established in 1951, as per the Delimitation Orders (1951).

== Mandals ==
Mandal
Renigunta
Yerpedu
Srikalahasti
Thottambedu

== Members of the Legislative Assembly ==
| Year | Member | Political party |
|---|---|---|
| 1952 | Adduru Balarami Reddy | Indian National Congress |
| 1955 | Patra Singaraiah | Indian National Congress |
| 1955 | Neelam Sanjiva Reddy | Indian National Congress |
| 1962 | Adduru Balarami Reddy | Indian National Congress |
| 1967 | Bojjala G. S. Reddy | Independent |
| 1972 | Adduru Balarami Reddy | Independent |
| 1978 | Vunnam Subramanyam Naidu | Indian National Congress |
| 1983 | Adduri Dasradharami Reddy | Telugu Desam Party |
| 1985 | Sathravada Muniramaiah | Telugu Desam Party |
| 1988 | Thatiparthy Chenchu Reddy | Indian National Congress |
| 1989 | Bojjala Gopala Krishna Reddy | Telugu Desam Party |
| 1994 | Bojjala Gopala Krishna Reddy | Telugu Desam Party |
| 1999 | Bojjala Gopala Krishna Reddy | Telugu Desam Party |
| 2004 | S. C. V. Naidu | Indian National Congress |
| 2009 | Bojjala Gopala Krishna Reddy | Telugu Desam Party |
| 2014 | Bojjala Gopala Krishna Reddy | Telugu Desam Party |
| 2019 | Biyyapu Madhusudhan Reddy | YSR Congress Party |
| 2024 | Bojjala Sudhir Reddy | Telugu Desam Party |

== Election results ==
=== 2024 ===
2024 Andhra Pradesh Legislative Assembly election: Srikalahasti
| Party | Candidate | Votes | % | ±% |
|---|---|---|---|---|
| TDP | Bojjala Sudhir Reddy | 121,565 | 58.08 | |
| YSRCP | Biyyapu Madhusudhan Reddy | 78261 | 37.39 | |
| Independent | Peram Nagaraju Naidu | 228 | 0.15 | |
| JBNP | Niranjan Reddy Rommala | 146 | 0.07 | |
| INC | Dr. Rajesh Naidu Pothugunta | 3002 | 1.43 | |
| NOTA | None Of The Above | 1975 | 0.94 | |
| Majority | | 43,304 | 20.68 | |
| Turnout | | 2,09,316 | | |
| TDP gain from YSRCP | | Swing | | |

=== 2019 ===
2019 Andhra Pradesh Legislative Assembly election: Srikalahasti
| Party | Candidate | Votes | % | ±% |
|---|---|---|---|---|
| YSRCP | Biyyapu Madhusudhan Reddy | 109,541 | 55.89% | |
| TDP | Bojjala Sudheer Reddy | 71,400 | 36.43% | |
| JSP | Nagaram Vinutha | 5,274 | 2.69% | |
| BJP | K Anand Kumar | 4,004 | 2.04% | |
| Majority | | 38,141 | 19.47 | |
| Turnout | | 195,994 | 82.47% | |
| YSRCP gain from TDP | | Swing | | |

=== 2014 ===
2014 Andhra Pradesh Legislative Assembly election: Srikalahasti
| Party | Candidate | Votes | % | ±% |
|---|---|---|---|---|
| TDP | Bojjala Gopala Krishna Reddy | 89,953 | 48.82 | |
| YSRCP | Biyyapu Madhusudhan Reddy | 82,370 | 10 | |
| Majority | | 7,583 | 4.11 | |
| Turnout | | 184,241 | 82.59 | +6.10 |
| TDP hold | | Swing | | |

=== 2009 ===
2009 Andhra Pradesh Legislative Assembly election: Srikalahasti
| Party | Candidate | Votes | % | ±% |
|---|---|---|---|---|
| TDP | Bojjala Gopala Krishna Reddy | 70,707 | 43.34 | −0.27 |
| INC | S. C. V. Naidu | 58,244 | 35.70 | −18.06 |
| PRP | Doctor Cipai Subramanyam | 24,349 | 14.93 | |
| Majority | | 12,463 | 7.64 | |
| Turnout | | 163,129 | 76.49 | −0.50 |
| TDP gain from INC | | Swing | | |

=== 2004 ===
2004 Andhra Pradesh Legislative Assembly election: Srikalahasti
| Party | Candidate | Votes | % | ±% |
|---|---|---|---|---|
| INC | S. C. V. Naidu | 69,262 | 53.76 | +8.89 |
| TDP | Bojjala Gopala Krishna Reddy | 56,185 | 43.61 | −8.43 |
| Majority | | 13,078 | 10.15 | |
| Turnout | | 128,837 | 76.99 | +8.00 |
| INC gain from TDP | | Swing | | |

== See also ==
- List of constituencies of Andhra Pradesh Vidhan Sabha
