= Adala Prabhakara Reddy =

Indian politician and Member of Parliament

Member of Parliament, Lok Sabha
- In office 23 May 2019 – 4 June 2024
- Preceded by: Mekapati Rajamohan Reddy
- Succeeded by: Vemireddy Prabhakar Reddy
- Constituency: Nellore

Member of Legislative Assembly Andhra Pradesh
- In office 2004–2014
- Preceded by: Somireddy Chandra Mohana Reddy
- Succeeded by: Kakani Govardhan Reddy
- Constituency: Sarvepalli
- In office 1999–2004
- Preceded by: Jakka Venkayya
- Succeeded by: Katamreddy Vishnuvardhan Reddy
- Constituency: Allur

Personal details
- Born: 25 October 1948 (age 77) North Mopuru
- Party: YSR Congress Party
- Other political affiliations: Telugu Desam Party; Indian National Congress
- Spouse: Adala Vindyavali (m. 1974)
- Children: 2
- Parents: Adala Shankar Reddy (father); Adala Susheela Amma (mother)

Adala Prabhakar Reddy is an Indian politician. He was elected to the 17th Lok Sabha, lower house of the Parliament of India from Nellore, Andhra Pradesh in the 2019 Indian general election as a member of the YSR Congress Party.

== Political Graph ==
- 1999 Alur MLA & Minister.
- 2004 Sarvepalli (Assembly constituency) as MLA.
- 2009 Sarvepalli (Assembly constituency) as MLA.
- 2019 Nellore (Lok Sabha constituency) MP.

== General Elections 2019 ==
2019 Indian general elections: Nellore
Party	Candidate	Votes	%	±%
YSRCP	Adala Prabhakara Reddy	683,830	58.0	
TDP	Beeda Masthan Rao	5,35,259	37.50	
CPI(M)	Chandra Rajagopal	18,830	1.46	
NOTA	None of the above	17,161	1.33	
BJP	Sannapureddy Suresh Reddy	12,513	0.97	
Majority		1,48,571	11.54	
Turnout		12,87,188	77.06	+6.28
YSRCP hold		Swing		
