= Bojjala Sudhir Reddy =

Indian politician

Member of Andhra Pradesh Legislative Assembly
- Incumbent
- Assumed office 4 June 2024
- Preceded by: Biyyapu Madhusudhan Reddy
- Constituency: Srikalahasti

Personal details
- Party: Telugu Desam Party
- Parent: Bojjala Gopala Krishna Reddy (father)
- Occupation: Politician

Bojjala Venkata Sudhir Reddy (born 1980) is an Indian politician from Andhra Pradesh. He is an MLA from Srikalahasti Assembly constituency in Tirupati district. He represents Telugu Desam Party. He won the 2024 Andhra Pradesh Legislative Assembly election where TDP had an alliance with BJP and Jana Sena Party.

== Early life and education ==
Reddy is from Urandur, Srikalahasti mandal, Tirupati district. His father,Bojjala Gopala Krishna Reddy, served as a cabinet minister in the Government of Andhra Pradesh and a five time MLA from Srikalahasti. He completed his Master of Business Administration degree in 2005 at Bharathi Institute of Higher Education and Research, which is an esteemed university in Selaiyur, Chennai.

== Career ==
Reddy won the 2024 Andhra Pradesh Legislative Assembly election from Srikalahasti Assembly constituency representing Telugu Desam Party. He polled 121, 565 votes and defeated his nearest rival Biyyapu Madhusudhan Reddy of YSR Congress Party by a margin of 43,304 votes.

== Elections results ==
=== 2024 ===
2024 Andhra Pradesh Legislative Assembly election: Srikalahasti
Party	Candidate	Votes	%	±%
TDP	Bojjala Sudhir Reddy	121,565		
YSRCP	Biyyapu Madhusudhan Reddy	78261		
JBNP	Niranjan Reddy Rommala			
INC	Dr. Rajesh Naidu Pothugunta	3002		
NOTA	None Of The Above			
Majority				
Turnout				
		Swing		

=== 2019 ===
2019 Andhra Pradesh Legislative Assembly election: Srikalahasti
Party	Candidate	Votes	%	±%
YSRCP	Biyyapu Madhusudhan Reddy	109,541	55.89%	
TDP	Bojjala Sudheer Reddy	71,400	36.43%	
JSP	Nagaram Vinutha	5,274	2.69%	
BJP	K Anand Kumar	4,004	2.04%	
Majority		38,141	19.47	
Turnout		195,994	82.47%	
YSRCP gain from TDP		Swing		
