= Bojjala Gopala Krishna Reddy =

Indian politician (1949–2022)

Minister of Environment, Forests Science & Technology, Cooperation Government of Andhra Pradesh
- In office 2014- 2019
- Governor: E. S. L. Narasimhan
- Chief Minister: N. Chandrababu Naidu
- Preceded by: Vijaya Ramaraju Setrucharla
- Succeeded by: Balineni Srinivasa Reddy

Minister of Information Technology, Roads and Buildings Government of Andhra Pradesh
- In office 1995 - 2004
- Governor: Krishan Kant; C. Rangarajan; Surjit Singh Barnala
- Chief Minister: N. Chandrababu Naidu
- Preceded by: Chintakayala Ayyanna Patrudu

Member of Legislative Assembly Andhra Pradesh
- In office 2009 - 2019
- Preceded by: S. C. V. Naidu
- Succeeded by: Biyyapu Madhusudhan Reddy
- Constituency: Srikalahasti
- In office 1989 - 2004
- Preceded by: Tatiparthi Chenchu Reddy
- Succeeded by: S. C. V. Naidu
- Constituency: Srikalahasti

Personal details
- Born: 15 April 1949 Urandur, Madras State, India (now in Andhra Pradesh, India)
- Died: 6 May 2022 (aged 73) Hyderabad, Telangana, India
- Party: Telugu Desam Party
- Spouse: Brunda
- Children: Padma; Sudhir

Bojjala Gopalakrishna Reddy (15 April 1949 – 6 May 2022) was an Indian politician from Andhra Pradesh. He was one of the senior leaders of Telugu Desam Party. He served as a member of the Andhra Pradesh Legislative Assembly for Srikalahasti from 2009 to 2019 and from 1989 to 2004, representing the Telugu Desam Party.

He worked as the Minister for Environment & Forests, Science & Technology, Cooperation in Nara Chandrababu Naidu Government.

== Early life ==
Reddy was born 15 April 1949 in Urandur village in Chittoor district, Andhra Pradesh, India. His father Ganga Subbarami Reddy was an MLA from Sri Kalahasti constituency. He received his Bachelor of Science degree in 1968 and Bachelor of Laws in 1972 from Sri Venkateswara University.

He married Brunda, daughter of congress minister late Peddireddy Thimmaa Reddy.

== Political career ==
After his marriage, Reddy moved to Hyderabad to pursue his career in law. Later he decided to enter politics. Reddy got a TDP ticket in 1989 and he won the election with big majority. Since then he was elected to Sri Kalahasti constituency 3 more times. During his tenure between 1994 and 2004, he served as cabinet minister for various departments including Information Technology and R&B. He was a close aide of Telugu Desam Party chief N Chandra Babu Naidu. He has won the A.P. elections in 2014 as a legislator of Srikalahasti constituency for the record fourth time. He was one of the council of Ministers who took Oath on 8 June 2014 and was the Cabinet Minister for Environment, forest, Science and Technology and Cooperative.

== Alipiri Bomb Blast ==
On 1 October 2003, Bojjala Gopalkrishna Reddy along with Andhra Pradesh Chief Minister Chandrababu Naidu received minor injuries when a mine blast hit the chief minister's convoy at Alipiri Road.

Chandrababu Naidu along with Reddy was on his way to Tirupati, where Brahmotsavam celebrations are on at the Lord Venkateswara temple.

Gopala Krishna Reddy received injuries to his shoulder and chest. Chandrababu Naidu received minor injuries to his chest, nose and right hand.

== Death ==
Reddy died of a heart attack on 6 May 2022 in a hospital in Hyderabad while he was undergoing treatment for COVID-19, during the COVID-19 pandemic in India. He had been in hospital for three months at the time of his death.
