= Nelavala Subrahmanyam =

Indian politician

Nelavala Subrahmanyam is an Indian politician. He was a Member of Parliament in 11th Lok Sabha. He was elected from Tirupathi parliamentary constituency with 52,332 votes.

== Career ==
Subrahmanyam started his career as President of Gram panchayat "Bheemavaram" in Naidupet mandal of Nellore district. He then worked as manager in Andhra Pragathi Grameena Bank for few years. He was MP from Tirupathi in 1996. In 2004 he won the seat for Sullurpet constituency as an MLA from Congress party. He was a member of TTD Trustees for two terms.

== Personal life ==
Subrahmanyam is married and has one daughter and two sons.
