= 2019 Indian general election in Andhra Pradesh =

Indian state election

- 11 April 2019

All 25 Andhra Pradesh seats to the Lok Sabha
- Turnout: 80.38% (▲2.17%)
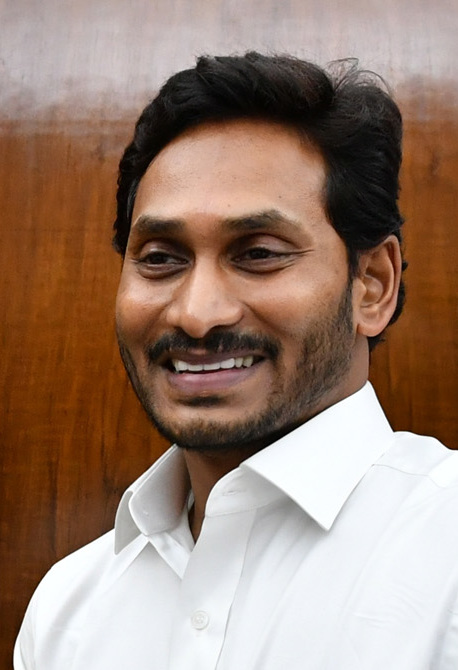

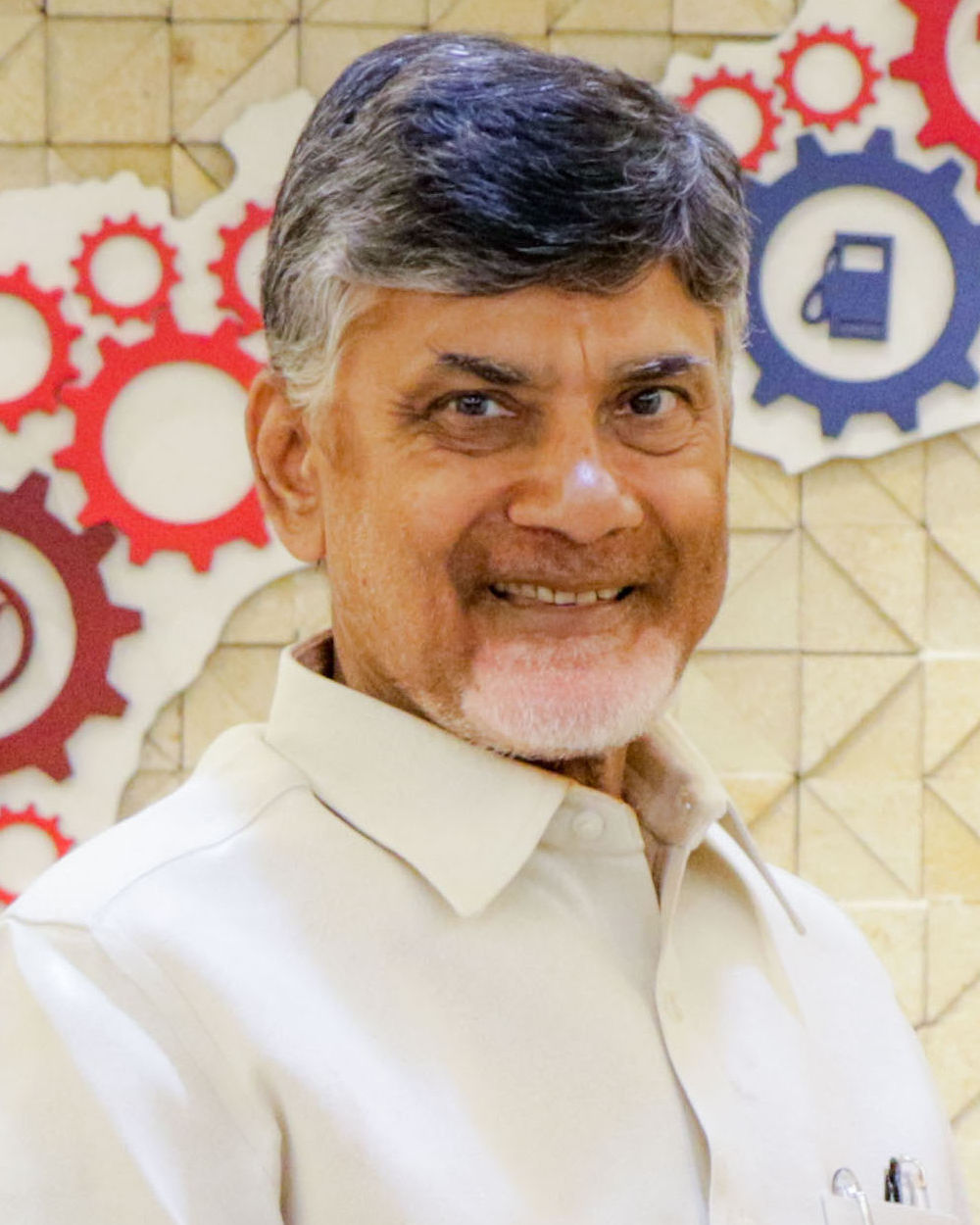
	First party	Second party
Leader	Y. S. Jagan Mohan Reddy	N. Chandrababu Naidu
Party	YSRCP	TDP
Leader's seat	Did not stand (Note: Member of the Andhra Pradesh Legislative Assembly for Pulivendla (re-elected) and Chief Minister of Andhra Pradesh)	Did not stand (Note: Member of the Andhra Pradesh Legislative Assembly for Kuppam (re-elected) and Leader of Opposition of Andhra Pradesh LA)
Last election	45.67%, 8 seats	40.80%, 15 seats
Seats won	22	3
Seat change	▲14	▼12
Popular vote	15,537,006	12,515,345
Percentage	49.89%	40.19%
Swing	▲4.22 pp	▼0.61 pp
- Winning party by constituency
Prime Minister before election
Narendra Modi
BJP
Prime Minister after election
Narendra Modi
BJP

The 2019 Indian general election in Andhra Pradesh were held on 11 April 2019 to elect representatives for the 17th Lok Sabha. The YSRCP swept the elections, winning 22 of the 25 Lok Sabha seats in the state. TDP was reduced to just 3 seats, and national parties like BJP and INC were decimated, not winning any seat.

== Parties and alliances ==
Alliance/Party		Flag	Symbol	Leader	Seats contested	
Telugu Desam Party				N. Chandrababu Naidu	25	
YSR Congress Party				Y. S. Jagan Mohan Reddy	25	
Indian National Congress				Raghu Veera Reddy	25	
Bharatiya Janata Party				Kanna Lakshminarayana	25	
JSP+	Janasena Party			Pawan Kalyan	17	24
JSP+	Bahujan Samaj Party			Mayawati	3	24
JSP+	Communist Party of India (Marxist)			B. V. Raghavulu	2	24
JSP+	Communist Party of India			K. Ramakrishna	2	24

== Candidates ==
Constituency		YSRCP		TDP		JSP+	
#	Name	Party	Candidate	Party	Candidate	Party	Candidate
1	Araku (ST)	YSRCP	Goddeti Madhavi	TDP	Kishore Chandra Deo	JSP	Gangulaiah Vampuru
2	Srikakulam	YSRCP	Duvvada Srinivas	TDP	Kinjarapu Ram Mohan Naidu	JSP	Metta Ramarao
3	Vizianagaram	YSRCP	Bellana Chandra Sekhar	TDP	Ashok Gajapathi Raju	JSP	Mukka Srinivas Rao
4	Visakhapatnam	YSRCP	M. V. V. Satyanarayana	TDP	Mathukumilli Bharat	JSP	V. V. Lakshminarayana
5	Anakapalle	YSRCP	Beesetti Venkata Satyavathi	TDP	Adari Anand Kumar	JSP	Chintala Partha Sarathi
6	Kakinada	YSRCP	Vanga Geetha	TDP	Chalamalasetty Sunil	JSP	Jyothula Venkateswara Rao
7	Amalapuram (SC)	YSRCP	Chinta Anuradha	TDP	Ganti Harish Madhur (Balayogi)	JSP	D M R Sekhar
8	Rajahmundry	YSRCP	Margani Bharat	TDP	Maganti Roopa	JSP	Akula Satyanarayana
9	Narasapuram	YSRCP	Raghu Rama Krishna Raju	TDP	V. V. Siva Rama Raju	JSP	Nagendra Babu
10	Eluru	YSRCP	Kotagiri Sridhar	TDP	Maganti Venkateswara Rao	JSP	Pentapati Pullarao
11	Machilipatnam	YSRCP	Vallabhaneni Balashowry	TDP	Konakalla Narayana Rao	JSP	Bandreddi Ramakrishna
12	Vijayawada	YSRCP	Prasad V. Potluri	TDP	Kesineni Nani	JSP	Muttamsetty Prasad babu
13	Guntur	YSRCP	Modugula Venugopala Reddy	TDP	Galla Jayadev	JSP	Bonaboyina Srinivasa Yadav
14	Narasaraopet	YSRCP	Lavu Sri Krishna Devarayalu	TDP	Rayapati Sambasiva Rao	JSP	Nayub Kamal Shaik
15	Bapatla (SC)	YSRCP	Nandigam Suresh	TDP	Malyadri Sriram	BSP	K. Devanand
16	Ongole	YSRCP	Magunta Sreenivasulu Reddy	TDP	Sidda Raghava Rao	JSP	Bellamkonda Saibabu
17	Nandyal	YSRCP	Pocha Brahmananda Reddy	TDP	Mandra Sivananda Reddy	JSP	S. P. Y. Reddy
18	Kurnool	YSRCP	Ayushman Doctor Sanjeev Kumar	TDP	Kotla Jayasurya Prakasha Reddy	CPI(M)	K. Prabhakara Reddy
19	Anantapur	YSRCP	Talari Rangaiah	TDP	J.C. Pavan Reddy	CPI	D. Jagadeesh
20	Hindupur	YSRCP	Kuruva Gorantla Madhav	TDP	Kristappa Nimmala	Did not contest	
21	Kadapa	YSRCP	Y. S. Avinash Reddy	TDP	Y. Adinarayana Reddy	CPI	Gujjula Eswaraiah
22	Nellore	YSRCP	Adala Prabhakara Reddy	TDP	Beeda Mastan Rao	CPI(M)	Chandra Rajagopal
23	Tirupati (SC)	YSRCP	Balli Durga Prasad Rao	TDP	Panabaka Lakshmi	BSP	Daggumati Sreehari Rao
24	Rajampet	YSRCP	P. V. Midhun Reddy	TDP	D. A. Sathya Prabha	JSP	Syed Mukarram
25	Chittoor (SC)	YSRCP	N. Reddeppa	TDP	Naramalli Sivaprasad	BSP	C. Punyamurthy

== Results ==
=== 2019 Indian general election in Andhra Pradesh Results party wise ===
Party Name		Popular vote			Seats		
Party Name		Votes	%	±pp (Note: Compared to the results in post-split Andhra Pradesh constituencies only.)	Contested	Won	+/−
YSRCP		1,55,37,006	49.15	▲3.48	25	22	▲14
TDP		1,25,15,345	39.59	▼1.21	25	3	▼12
JSP+	JSP	18,29,346	5.79	New	17	0	Steady
JSP+	BSP	83,613	0.26	Steady	3	0	Steady
JSP+	CPI(M)	37,895	0.12	Steady	2	0	Steady
JSP+	CPI	26,536	0.08	Steady	2	0	Steady
JSP+	Total	19,77,390	6.26	Steady	24	0	Steady
INC		4,06,977	1.29	▼1.57	25	0	Steady
BJP		3,03,985	0.96	▼6.26	24	0	▼2
Others		1,51,768	0.48	Steady	96	0	Steady
IND		2,48,025	0.78	▼0.15	99	0	Steady
NOTA		4,68,822	1.48	▲0.83			
Total		3,16,12,534	100%	-	319	25	-

== Detailed results ==
Constituency			Winner				Runner Up				Margin	%
#	Name	Poll %	Candidate	Party	Votes	%	Candidate	Party	Votes	%	Margin	%
1	Araku (ST)	74.03	Goddeti Madhavi	YSRCP	562,190	52.14	Kishore Chandra Deo	TDP	338,101	31.36	224,089	20.78
2	Srikakulam	74.48	Kinjarapu Ram Mohan Naidu	TDP	534,544	45.91	Duvvada Srinivas	YSRCP	527,891	45.34	6,653	0.57
3	Vizianagaram	81.28	Bellana Chandra Sekhar	YSRCP	578,418	47.49	Ashok Gajapathi Raju	TDP	530,382	43.55	48,036	3.94
4	Visakhapatnam	67.79	M. V. V. Satyanarayana	YSRCP	436,906	35.24	Mathukumilli Bharat	TDP	432,492	34.89	4,414	0.35
5	Anakapalle	81.54	Beesetti Venkata Satyavathi	YSRCP	586,226	47.33	Adari Anand Kumar	TDP	497,034	40.13	89,192	7.20
6	Kakinada	79.08	Vanga Geetha	YSRCP	537,630	43.47	Chalamalasetty Sunil	TDP	511,892	41.38	25,738	2.09
7	Amalapuram (SC)	84.64	Chinta Anuradha	YSRCP	485,313	39.43	Ganti Harish Madhur (Balayogi)	TDP	445,347	36.18	39,966	3.25
8	Rajahmundry	81.50	Margani Bharat	YSRCP	582,024	46.55	Maganti Roopa	TDP	460,390	36.82	121,634	9.73
9	Narasapuram	81.90	Raghu Rama Krishna Raju	YSRCP	447,594	38.11	V. V. Siva Rama Raju	TDP	415,685	35.39	31,909	2.72
10	Eluru	83.53	Kotagiri Sridhar	YSRCP	676,809	50.99	Maganti Venkateswara Rao	TDP	510,884	38.47	165,925	12.52
11	Machilipatnam	84.54	Vallabhaneni Balashowry	YSRCP	571,436	46.02	Konakalla Narayana Rao	TDP	511,295	41.18	60,141	4.84
12	Vijayawada	77.30	Kesineni Nani	TDP	575,498	45.04	Prasad V. Potluri	YSRCP	566,772	44.36	8,726	0.68
13	Guntur	79.21	Galla Jayadev	TDP	587,918	43.50	Modugula Venugopala Reddy	YSRCP	583,713	43.19	4,205	0.31
14	Narasaraopet	86.25	Lavu Sri Krishna Devarayalu	YSRCP	745,089	51.75	Rayapati Sambasiva Rao	TDP	591,111	41.06	153,978	10.69
15	Bapatla (SC)	86.47	Nandigam Suresh	YSRCP	598,257	47.24	Malyadri Sriram	TDP	582,192	45.97	16,065	1.27
16	Ongole	86.35	Magunta Sreenivasulu Reddy	YSRCP	739,202	55.07	Sidda Raghava Rao	TDP	524,351	39.06	214,851	16.01
17	Nandyal	81.07	Pocha Brahmananda Reddy	YSRCP	720,888	55.49	Mandra Sivananda Reddy	TDP	470,769	36.24	250,119	19.25
18	Kurnool	75.69	Sanjeev Kumar	YSRCP	602,554	50.98	Kotla Jayasurya Prakasha Reddy	TDP	453,665	38.38	148,889	12.60
19	Anantapur	81.01	Talari Rangaiah	YSRCP	695,208	51.57	J. C. Pavan Reddy	TDP	553,780	41.08	141,428	10.49
20	Hindupur	84.91	Kuruva Gorantla Madhav	YSRCP	706,602	52.73	Kristappa Nimmala	TDP	565,854	42.23	140,748	10.50
21	Kadapa	78.22	Y. S. Avinash Reddy	YSRCP	783,499	63.79	Y. Adinarayana Reddy	TDP	402,773	32.79	380,726	31.00
22	Nellore	76.94	Adala Prabhakara Reddy	YSRCP	683,830	53.04	Beeda Mastan Rao	TDP	535,259	41.52	148,571	11.52
23	Tirupati (SC)	79.59	Balli Durga Prasad Rao	YSRCP	722,877	54.91	Panabaka Lakshmi	TDP	494,501	37.56	228,376	17.35
24	Rajampet	79.15	P. V. Midhun Reddy	YSRCP	702,211	57.27	D. A. Sathya Prabha	TDP	433,927	35.39	268,284	21.88
25	Chittoor (SC)	84.23	N. Reddeppa	YSRCP	686,792	52.04	Naramalli Sivaprasad	TDP	549,521	41.64	137,271	10.40

== Assembly segments wise lead of Parties ==
Party	Assembly segments	Position in Assembly (Note: (as of 2019 simultaneous elections))	Change in seats (Note: Change in Assembly Constituency-wise Seats Compared to the Assembly Election which was held simultaneously)
YSR Congress Party	140	151	▼11
Telugu Desam Party	34	23	▲11
Janasena Party	1	1	Steady
Total	175		

== Assembly Seat wise leads ==
Constituency		Winner		Runner-up		Margin
#	Name	Party	Votes	Party	Votes	Margin
Araku Lok Sabha constituency
10	Palakonda (ST)	YSRCP	69,588	TDP	54,056	15,532
11	Kurupam (ST)	YSRCP	71,694	TDP	51,399	20,295
12	Parvathipuram (SC)	YSRCP	68,836	TDP	57,159	11,677
13	Salur (ST)	YSRCP	76,281	TDP	59,128	17,153
28	Araku Valley (ST)	YSRCP	83,652	TDP	23,849	59,803
29	Paderu (ST)	YSRCP	82,473	TDP	27,101	55,372
53	Rampachodavaram (ST)	YSRCP	105,037	TDP	63,471	41,566
Srikakulam Lok Sabha constituency
1	Ichchapuram	TDP	83,375	YSRCP	69,572	13,803
2	Palasa	TDP	70,050	YSRCP	66,319	3,731
3	Tekkali	TDP	86,897	YSRCP	78,289	8,608
4	Pathapatnam	YSRCP	72,134	TDP	65,828	6,306
5	Srikakulam	TDP	86,800	YSRCP	77,144	9,656
6	Amadalavalasa	YSRCP	75,759	TDP	63,490	12,269
8	Narasannapeta	YSRCP	81,714	TDP	72,773	8,941
Vizianagaram Lok Sabha constituency
7	Etcherla	YSRCP	96,447	TDP	81,865	14,582
9	Rajam (SC)	YSRCP	77,231	TDP	70,709	6,522
14	Bobbili	YSRCP	82,816	TDP	77,990	4,826
15	Cheepurupalle	YSRCP	87,430	TDP	64,250	23,180
16	Gajapathinagaram	YSRCP	82,956	TDP	71,872	11,084
17	Nellimarla	YSRCP	85,233	TDP	72,449	12,784
18	Vizianagaram	TDP	88,172	YSRCP	61,353	26,819
Visakhapatnam Lok Sabha constituency
19	Srungavarapukota	YSRCP	81,394	TDP	73,414	7,980
20	Bhimili	YSRCP	88,014	TDP	87,380	634
21	Visakhapatnam East	TDP	60,990	YSRCP	56,787	4,203
22	Visakhapatnam South	TDP	44,388	YSRCP	40,712	3,676
23	Visakhapatnam North	TDP	58,651	YSRCP	57,349	1,302
24	Visakhapatnam West	TDP	50,560	YSRCP	42,225	8,335
25	Gajuwaka	JSP	68,567	YSRCP	67,487	1,080
Anakapalle Lok Sabha constituency
26	Chodavaram	YSRCP	87,900	TDP	72,492	15,408
27	Madugula	YSRCP	77,967	TDP	64,309	13,658
30	Anakapalle	YSRCP	72,607	TDP	64,735	7,872
31	Pendurthi	YSRCP	86,961	TDP	79,499	7,462
32	Yelamanchili	TDP	74,400	YSRCP	71,183	3,217
33	Payakaraopet (SC)	YSRCP	97,899	TDP	70,888	27,011
34	Narsipatnam	YSRCP	88,693	TDP	69,058	19,635
Kakinada Lok Sabha constituency
35	Tuni	YSRCP	89,719	TDP	70,857	18,862
36	Prathipadu	YSRCP	76,627	TDP	73,199	3,428
37	Pithapuram	YSRCP	84,283	TDP	72,799	11,484
38	Kakinada Rural	YSRCP	71,390	TDP	70,623	767
39	Peddapuram	TDP	72,594	YSRCP	61,009	11,585
41	Kakinada City	TDP	70,511	YSRCP	67,133	3,378
52	Jaggampeta	YSRCP	84,494	TDP	77,778	6,716
Amalapuram Lok Sabha constituency
42	Ramachandrapuram	YSRCP	74,568	TDP	63,636	10,932
43	Mummidivaram	YSRCP	78,430	TDP	76,606	1,824
44	Amalapuram (SC)	YSRCP	68,359	TDP	50,118	18,241
45	Razole (SC)	YSRCP	48,303	TDP	47,846	457
46	Gannavaram (SC)	YSRCP	64,753	TDP	48,545	16,208
47	Kothapeta	TDP	78,889	YSRCP	78,597	292
48	Mandapeta	TDP	77,950	YSRCP	68,993	8,957
Rajahmundry Lok Sabha constituency
40	Anaparthy	YSRCP	105,792	TDP	58,094	47,698
49	Rajanagaram	YSRCP	88,997	TDP	57,264	31,733
50	Rajahmundry City	TDP	79,626	YSRCP	51,847	27,779
51	Rajahmundry Rural	TDP	76,326	YSRCP	65,746	10,580
54	Kovvur (SC)	YSRCP	75,459	TDP	54,640	20,819
55	Nidadavole	YSRCP	80,993	TDP	60,443	20,550
66	Gopalapuram (SC)	YSRCP	109,637	TDP	72,707	36,930
Narasapuram Lok Sabha constituency
56	Achanta	YSRCP	63,452	TDP	53,322	10,130
57	Palacole	TDP	61,392	YSRCP	50,256	11,136
58	Narasapuram	YSRCP	56,012	JSP	46,184	9,828
59	Bhimavaram	TDP	67,080	YSRCP	66,561	519
60	Undi	TDP	79,186	YSRCP	68,138	11,048
61	Tanuku	YSRCP	71,168	TDP	68,321	2,847
62	Tadepalligudem	YSRCP	68,789	TDP	54,914	13,875
Eluru Lok Sabha constituency
63	Unguturu	YSRCP	92,242	TDP	62,008	30,234
64	Denduluru	YSRCP	96,463	TDP	76,481	19,982
65	Eluru	YSRCP	70,319	TDP	67,844	2,475
67	Polavaram (ST)	YSRCP	115,402	TDP	68,679	46,723
68	Chintalapudi (SC)	YSRCP	115,361	TDP	76,491	38,870
70	Nuzvid	YSRCP	104,337	TDP	83,002	21,335
73	Kaikalur	YSRCP	78,710	TDP	75,044	3,666
Machilipatnam Lok Sabha constituency
71	Gannavaram	YSRCP	104,728	TDP	94,865	9,863
72	Gudivada	TDP	75,790	YSRCP	75,039	751
74	Pedana	YSRCP	60,115	TDP	55,774	4,341
75	Machilipatnam	YSRCP	64,089	TDP	60,035	4,054
76	Avanigadda	YSRCP	85,242	TDP	66,116	19,126
77	Pamarru (SC)	YSRCP	80,411	TDP	63,683	16,728
78	Penamaluru	YSRCP	97,968	TDP	93,624	4,344
Vijayawada Lok Sabha constituency
69	Tiruvuru (SC)	YSRCP	85,246	TDP	80,642	4,604
79	Vijayawada West	TDP	68,297	YSRCP	60,142	8,155
80	Vijayawada Central	TDP	75,015	YSRCP	70,470	4,545
81	Vijayawada East	TDP	81,965	YSRCP	69,112	12,853
82	Mylavaram	YSRCP	111,397	TDP	105,490	5,907
83	Nandigama (SC)	YSRCP	84,796	TDP	77,803	6,993
84	Jaggayyapeta	TDP	84,717	YSRCP	83,011	1,706
Guntur Lok Sabha constituency
86	Tadikonda (SC)	YSRCP	83,883	TDP	82,121	1,762
87	Mangalagiri	TDP	106,513	YSRCP	99,311	7,202
88	Ponnur	TDP	86,501	YSRCP	81,823	4,678
91	Tenali	YSRCP	86,316	TDP	82,866	3,450
93	Prathipadu (SC)	YSRCP	90,761	TDP	90,327	434
94	Guntur West	TDP	76,438	YSRCP	67,488	8,950
95	Guntur East	YSRCP	71,258	TDP	61,526	9,732
Narasaraopet Lok Sabha constituency
85	Pedakurapadu	YSRCP	96,998	TDP	85,490	11,508
96	Chilakaluripet	YSRCP	94,680	TDP	87,016	7,664
97	Narasaraopet	YSRCP	99,682	TDP	68,332	31,350
98	Sattenapalle	YSRCP	103,054	TDP	83,668	19,386
99	Vinukonda	YSRCP	118,153	TDP	91,472	26,681
100	Gurajala	YSRCP	117,284	TDP	86,748	30,536
101	Macherla	YSRCP	110,658	TDP	86,618	24,040
Bapatla Lok Sabha constituency
89	Vemuru (SC)	YSRCP	82,203	TDP	71,731	10,472
90	Repalle	TDP	87,013	YSRCP	80,298	6,715
92	Bapatla	YSRCP	80,551	TDP	61,568	18,983
104	Parchur	YSRCP	95,495	TDP	94,238	1,257
105	Addanki	TDP	102,686	YSRCP	95,998	6,688
106	Chirala	TDP	82,597	YSRCP	66,815	15,782
107	Santhanuthalapadu (SC)	YSRCP	90,890	TDP	77,570	13,320
Ongole Lok Sabha constituency
102	Yerragondapalem (SC)	YSRCP	97,532	TDP	67,236	30,296
103	Darsi	YSRCP	106,139	TDP	76,582	29,557
108	Ongole	YSRCP	100,797	TDP	76,994	23,803
110	Kondapi (SC)	YSRCP	97,481	TDP	95,604	1,877
111	Markapuram	YSRCP	91,324	TDP	76,760	14,564
112	Giddalur	YSRCP	127,294	TDP	50,210	77,084
113	Kanigiri	YSRCP	108,777	TDP	72,901	35,876
Nandyal Lok Sabha constituency
134	Allagadda	YSRCP	105,073	TDP	66,578	38,495
135	Srisailam	YSRCP	88,987	TDP	53,516	35,471
136	Nandikotkur (SC)	YSRCP	98,776	TDP	61,818	36,958
138	Panyam	YSRCP	117,811	TDP	75,346	42,465
139	Nandyal	YSRCP	105,703	TDP	68,030	37,673
140	Banaganapalle	YSRCP	102,510	TDP	77,429	25,081
141	Dhone	YSRCP	96,164	TDP	64,152	32,012
Kurnool Lok Sabha constituency
137	Kurnool	TDP	63,589	YSRCP	58,509	5,080
142	Pattikonda	YSRCP	98,189	TDP	64,342	33,847
143	Kodumur (SC)	YSRCP	90,381	TDP	63,473	26,908
144	Yemmiganur	YSRCP	94,074	TDP	69,576	24,498
145	Mantralayam	YSRCP	86,148	TDP	59,716	26,432
146	Adoni	YSRCP	71,807	TDP	64,762	7,045
147	Alur	YSRCP	103,990	TDP	67,613	36,377
Anantapur Lok Sabha constituency
148	Rayadurg	YSRCP	108,792	TDP	92,153	16,639
149	Uravakonda	YSRCP	90,035	TDP	86,709	3,326
150	Guntakal	YSRCP	107,265	TDP	72,312	34,953
151	Tadpatri	YSRCP	94,066	TDP	87,374	6,692
152	Singanamala (SC)	YSRCP	115,416	TDP	73,784	41,632
153	Anantapur Urban	YSRCP	84,115	TDP	66,561	17,554
154	Kalyandurg	YSRCP	91,212	TDP	71,704	19,508
Hindupur Lok Sabha constituency
155	Raptadu	YSRCP	113,944	TDP	82,289	31,655
156	Madakasira (SC)	YSRCP	90,416	TDP	76,411	14,005
157	Hindupur	TDP	88,300	YSRCP	78,968	9,332
158	Penukonda	YSRCP	99,921	TDP	83,195	16,726
159	Puttaparthi	YSRCP	98,131	TDP	66,882	31,249
160	Dharmavaram	YSRCP	110,437	TDP	90,285	20,152
161	Kadiri	YSRCP	107,922	TDP	74,240	33,682
Kadapa Lok Sabha constituency
124	Badvel (SC)	YSRCP	105,076	TDP	47,374	57,702
126	Kadapa	YSRCP	104,268	TDP	53,243	51,025
129	Pulivendla	YSRCP	131,684	TDP	43,459	88,225
130	Kamalapuram	YSRCP	95,887	TDP	57,697	38,190
131	Jammalamadugu	YSRCP	125,780	TDP	70,733	55,047
132	Proddatur	YSRCP	111,250	TDP	66,209	45,041
133	Mydukur	YSRCP	104,022	TDP	61,427	42,595
Nellore Lok Sabha constituency
109	Kandukur	YSRCP	101,380	TDP	86,598	14,782
114	Kavali	YSRCP	94,855	TDP	90,369	4,486
115	Atmakur	YSRCP	95,206	TDP	68,682	26,524
116	Kovur	YSRCP	116,523	TDP	77,597	38,926
117	Nellore City	YSRCP	74,382	TDP	71,856	2,526
118	Nellore Rural	YSRCP	88,525	TDP	65,569	22,956
123	Udayagiri	YSRCP	106,143	TDP	68,900	37,243
Tirupati Lok Sabha constituency
119	Sarvepalli	YSRCP	97,170	TDP	81,244	15,926
120	Gudur (SC)	YSRCP	110,031	TDP	63,650	46,381
121	Sullurpeta (SC)	YSRCP	116,970	TDP	59,694	57,276
122	Venkatagiri	YSRCP	105,741	TDP	69,542	36,199
167	Tirupati	TDP	81,842	YSRCP	78,264	3,578
168	Srikalahasti	YSRCP	108,052	TDP	75,133	32,919
169	Satyavedu (SC)	YSRCP	101,696	TDP	59,500	42,196
Rajampet Lok Sabha constituency
125	Rajampet	YSRCP	102,275	TDP	59,163	43,112
127	Kodur (SC)	YSRCP	80,487	TDP	44,017	36,470
128	Rayachoti	YSRCP	103,004	TDP	64,370	38,634
162	Thamballapalle	YSRCP	108,210	TDP	56,329	51,881
163	Pileru	YSRCP	91,374	TDP	75,286	16,088
164	Madanapalle	YSRCP	96,948	TDP	64,287	32,661
165	Punganur	YSRCP	112,979	TDP	66,258	46,721
Chittoor Lok Sabha constituency
166	Chandragiri	YSRCP	121,245	TDP	90,924	30,321
170	Nagari	TDP	78,124	YSRCP	76,849	1,275
171	Gangadhara Nellore (SC)	YSRCP	103,137	TDP	58,562	44,575
172	Chittoor	YSRCP	88,290	TDP	54,338	33,952
173	Puthalapattu (SC)	YSRCP	103,911	TDP	72,483	31,428
174	Palamaner	YSRCP	116,822	TDP	91,571	25,251
175	Kuppam	TDP	99,372	YSRCP	71,071	28,301
