= Gade Venkata Reddy =

Indian politician (1940–2026)

Minister of Cooperation Government of Andhra Pradesh
- In office 25 May 2009 – 24 November 2010
- Governor: N. D. Tiwari; E. S. L. Narasimhan
- Chief Minister: Y. S. Rajasekhara Reddy; Konijeti Rosaiah
- Succeeded by: Kasu Venkata Krishna Reddy

Minister of Excise & Prohibition Government of Andhra Pradesh
- In office 1992–1994
- Governor: Krishan Kant
- Chief Minister: Kotla Vijaya Bhaskara Reddy

Member of Legislative Assembly Andhra Pradesh
- In office 2004–2014
- Preceded by: Manthena Anantha Varma
- Succeeded by: Kona Raghupathi
- Constituency: Bapatla
- In office 1991–1999
- Preceded by: Daggubati Venkateswara Rao
- Succeeded by: Jagarlamudi Lakshmi Padmavathi
- Constituency: Parchur
- In office 1967–1972
- Preceded by: Naraharisetty Venkatswamy
- Succeeded by: Maddukuri Narayan Rao
- Constituency: Parchur

Personal details
- Born: 10 July 1940 Pavuluru, Madras Province, British India
- Died: 29 May 2026 (aged 85) Hyderabad, Telangana, India
- Party: YSR Congress Party
- Spouse: Smt. Veeranjaneyamma

Gade Venkat Reddy (10 July 1940 – 29 May 2026) was an Indian politician from Prakasam district and a 5-term MLA of the Indian National Congress Party. He was first elected in 1967 from Parchur Constituency, then within Bapatla Taluk and Guntur district. Reddy was an advocate and businessman by profession and entered into politics later.

Reddy was elected to serve as the Member of the Legislative Assembly for Bapatla Assembly constituency in Andhra Pradesh, India, between 2004 and 2014. He represented the Indian National Congress.

== Early life ==
Gade Venkata Reddy was born at Pavuluru in Prakasam district to Gade Veera Reddy. He graduated with a B.A (LLB) in 1959 in Bapatla.

== Political career ==
Reddy was elected as Member of Legislative Assembly to Bapatla (Assembly constituency) seat during 2009 assembly elections.

=== Ministerial portfolios held ===
- Cabinet Minister for Endowments under Y. S. Rajasekhara Reddy & Konijeti Rosaiah between 2009 and 2010.
- Cabinet Minister for Excise & Prohibition under Kotla Vijaya Bhaskara Reddy in 1993.

== Death ==
Reddy died on 29 May 2026, at the age of 86.

Political offices
Preceded by	Endowments Minister of Andhra Pradesh; 2009–2010	Succeeded by C. Ramachandraiah
Preceded by	Excise Minister of Andhra Pradesh; 1983	Succeeded by
