= Bapatla Lok Sabha constituency =

Lok Sabha constituency in Andhra Pradesh, India

Coordinates: 15.9°N 80.5°E

Bapatla AP-15
- Lok Sabha constituency
- Interactive Map Outlining Bapatla Lok Sabha constituency

Constituency details
- Country: India
- Region: South India
- State: Andhra Pradesh
- Assembly constituencies: Vemuru; Repalle; Bapatla; Parchur; Addanki; Chirala; Santhanuthalapadu
- Established: 1977
- Reservation: SC

Member of Parliament
- 18th Lok Sabha
- Incumbent Krishna Prasad Tenneti
- Party: TDP
- Alliance: NDA
- Elected year: 2024
- Preceded by: Nandigam Suresh

Bapatla is one of the twenty-five lok sabha constituencies of Andhra Pradesh in India. It comprises seven assembly segments in Bapatla and Prakasam districts .

Most Successful parties from Bapatla Lok Sabha
1. TDP (6 Times) (46.0%)
2. INC (6 Times) (46.0%)
3. YSRCP (1 time) (8.00%)

== Assembly segments ==
Bapatla constituency comprises the following Legislative Assembly segments:

#	Name	District	Member	Party	Leading (in 2024)
89	Vemuru(SC)	Bapatla	Nakka Ananda Babu	TDP	TDP
90	Repalle	Bapatla	Anagani Satya Prasad	TDP	TDP
92	Bapatla	Bapatla	Vegesana Narendra Varma Raju	TDP	TDP
104	Parchur	Bapatla	Yeluri Sambasiva Rao	TDP	TDP
105	Addanki	Prakasam	Gottipati Ravi Kumar	TDP	TDP
106	Chirala	Bapatla	Madduluri Malakondaiah Yadav	TDP	TDP
107	Santhanuthalapadu(SC)	Prakasam	B. N. Vijay Kumar	TDP	TDP

Source: Assembly segments of Parliamentary constituencies

== Members of Parliament ==
Year	Member	Party
1977	P. Ankineedu Prasada Rao	Indian National Congress
1980	P. Ankineedu Prasada Rao	Indian National Congress
1984	Chimata Sambu	Telugu Desam Party
1989	Salagala Benjamin	Indian National Congress
1991	Daggubati Venkateswara Rao	Telugu Desam Party
1996	Ummareddy Venkateswarlu	Telugu Desam Party
1998	Nedurumalli Janardhana Reddy	Indian National Congress
1999	Daggubati Ramanaidu	Telugu Desam Party
2004	Daggubati Purandeswari	Indian National Congress
2009	Panabaka Lakshmi	Indian National Congress
2014	Malyadri Sriram	Telugu Desam Party
2019	Nandigam Suresh	YSR Congress Party
2024	Krishna Prasad Tenneti	Telugu Desam Party

== Election results ==
=== General Election 1989 ===
General Election, 1989: Bapatla
Party	Candidate	Votes	%	±%
INC	Salagala Benjamin	364,008	52.15	+6.19
BJP	Muppavarapu Venkaiah Naidu	320,388	45.90	
Majority		43,620	6.25	
Turnout		697,980	69.82	+1.65
INC gain from TDP		Swing		

=== General Election 1991 ===
General Election, 1991: Bapatla
Party	Candidate	Votes	%	±%
TDP	Daggubati Venkateswara Rao	285,788	46.82	
INC	Salagala Benjamin	284,681	46.64	−5.51
Majority		1,107	0.18	
Turnout		610,418	61.08	−8.74
TDP gain from INC		Swing		

=== General Election 1996 ===
General Election, 1996: Bapatla
Party	Candidate	Votes	%	±%
TDP	Ummareddy Venkateswarlu	276,064	41.51	−5.31
INC	Vijaya Prad Arya	267,802	40.27	−6.37
NTRTDP(LP)	Laavu Rathaiah	98,554	14.82	
Majority		8,262	1.24	
Turnout		665,086	61.93	+0.85
TDP hold		Swing		

=== General Election 1998 ===
General Election, 1998: Bapatla
Party	Candidate	Votes	%	±%
INC	Nedurumalli Janardhana Reddy	316,788	47.31	+7.04
TDP	Ummareddy Venkateswarlu	276,300	41.27	−0.24
BJP	Ganesuni Rathaiah Chowdary	66,914	9.99	
Majority		40,488	6.04	
Turnout		669,535	62.62	+0.69
INC gain from TDP		Swing		

=== General Election 1999 ===
General Election, 1999: Bapatla
Party	Candidate	Votes	%	±%
TDP	Daggubati Ramanaidu	399,596	55.83	+14.56
INC	Jesudasu Seelam	307,139	42.92	−4.39
Majority		92,457	12.91	
Turnout		715,681	66.40	+3.78
TDP gain from INC		Swing		

=== General Election 2004 ===
General Election, 2004: Bapatla
Party	Candidate	Votes	%	±%
INC	Daggubati Purandareswari	411,009	55.88	+12.96
TDP	Daggubati Ramanaidu	317,017	43.10	−12.73
TRS	Chellamalla Venkata Reddy	3,753	0.51	
Independent	Prathipati Srinivasu	2,159	0.29	
Independent	Inaganti Apparao	1,434	0.19	
Majority		93,992	12.78	
Turnout		735,462	77.50	+11.10
INC gain from TDP		Swing		

=== General Election 2009 ===
General Election, 2009: Bapatla
Party	Candidate	Votes	%	±%
INC	Panabaka Lakshmi	460,757	44.15	−11.73
TDP	Malyadri Sriram	391,419	37.51	−5.59
PRP	Nuthakki Rama Rao	144,593	13.85	
BJP	Battula Rosayya	14,370	1.38	
BSP	Dara Sambaiah	8,979	0.86	
Majority		69,338	6.64	
Turnout		1,043,627	78.96	+1.46
INC hold		Swing		

=== General Election 2014 ===
2014 Indian general elections: Bapatla
Party	Candidate	Votes	%	±%
TDP	Malyadri Sriram	578,145	48.80	+11.29
YSRCP	Varikuti Amruthapani	545,391	46.04	N/A
INC	Panabaka Lakshmi	23,072	1.95	−42.20
PPoI	Yellamati Ramesh	8,414	0.71	N/A
BSP	Dwarapalli Philipu	8,113	0.68	N/A
AAP	Eda Chennaiah	3,948	0.33	N/A
JSP	R. D. Wilson	3,657	0.31	N/A
NOTA	None of the Above	6,146	0.52	N/A
Majority		32,754	2.76	−3.88
Turnout		11,84,634	85.04	+6.08
TDP gain from INC		Swing		

=== 2019 ===
2019 Indian general elections: Bapatla
Party	Candidate	Votes	%	±%
YSRCP	Nandigam Suresh	598,257	47.24	
TDP	Malyadri Sriram	582,192	45.97	
BSP	K. Devanand	42,580	3.36	
BJP	Challagali Kishore Kumar	10,351	0.82	
NOTA	None of the above	13,218	1,04	
Majority		16,065	1.27	
Turnout		12,69,998	86.47	
Registered electors		14,68,671		
YSRCP gain from TDP		Swing		

=== 2024 ===
2024 Indian general elections: Bapatla
Party	Candidate	Votes	%	±%
TDP	Krishna Prasad Tenneti	717,493	55.16	
YSRCP	Nandigam Suresh	5,09,462	39.17	
INC	Jesudasu Seelam	43,259	3.33	
NOTA	None of the above	13,723	1.06	
Majority		2,08,031	15.99	
Turnout		13,08,243	86.57	
TDP gain from YSRCP		Swing		

== See also ==
- List of constituencies of the Andhra Pradesh Legislative Assembly
