= Komaravolu Sivaprasad =

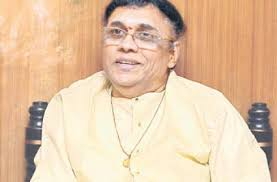
- Born: 26 April 1955 (age 71); Guntur,
- Occupation: Performing Musician
- Years active: 1967–present
- Awards: Kala Ratna Government of Andhra Pradesh (2016)
- Musical career
- Genres: Indian classical music; Carnatic Music; Whistle
- Website: www.whistlewizard.com

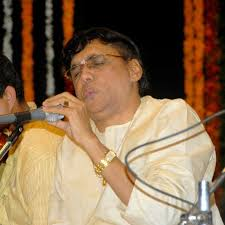
Komaravolu Sivaprasad

Komaravolu Sivaprasad (born 26 April 1955) is a whistling musician in the Carnatic tradition. He is the first professional whistling artist in Indian classical music. He was awarded the title Kala Ratna by the Government of Andhra Pradesh in 2016.

== Early life ==
Sivaprasad was born in Bapatla, a coastal town in Guntur district of Andhra Pradesh, India as the ninth child of K.S.V. Subba Rao and Rajyalakshmi. He started whistling at an young age. Whistling is generally not appreciated in Indian culture. It is considered as a loafer's pastime. However, his uncle Prof. K.Chandrasekharan, a Padmasri awardee in the year 1959. and his elder brother Pardhasarathi (an amateur whistler himself) encouraged Sivaprasad to hone his skill.

His maiden public performance was at the age of twelve, when he covered for the late arrival of veteran artist Mulukutla Sadasiva Sastry. actor, director, producer, and later Governor of Puducherry and Maharastra, Kona Prabhakara Rao was impressed by the talent of young Sivaprasad and became his mentor.

== Musical style ==
The whistling sound can typically be produced only on exhalation of the breath. Therefore, an uninterrupted performance was not possible which precluded it from becoming a serious art form. However, Sivaprasad mastered a technique through which he could produce the sound even when inhaling. This was his breakthrough and encouraged him to consider more serious training.

== Training ==
Sivaprasad was introduced to Padmavibhushan Dr. M. Balamuralikrishna, a celebrated classical musician, and Dr. N.S.Srinivasan, a flute vidwan (disciple of veteran artist T. R. Mahalingam) from whom he received advance training in Classical Carnatic music.

== Performances ==
Up to the present time, Sivaprasad has given more than 10000 performances worldwide. He was selected by the Government of India for participation in the Festival of India in Moscow in the year 1988-89 under the leadership of P.V. Narasimha Rao, the then External Affairs Minister of India. He also participated in the International Music Festival as a Unique Artiste of the Globe in the year 1996.

== Recognition ==
He entered the Limca Book of Records in 1991 as the first Whistling artist to release an LP record in the world. He was appointed as the Asthana Vidwan of Mysore Datta Peetam in 1984 and of Kanchi Kamakoti Peetam in 2013.

== Honours ==
=== Titles ===
- Whistle Wizard - The Indian Express, 1981
- Gala Murali - Dr.M.Balamuralikrishna
- Andhra Koyila - M.G.Ramachandran, The then Chief Minister, Tamil Nadu, 1981
- Human Flute - Pupul Jayakar, Cultural Adviser to the Prime Minister Indira Gandhi, 1981
- Mukha Murali - bestowed by Ganapathy Sachidananda Swami of Datta Peetham, Mysore, 1986
- Swasa Murali - conferred by Padmabhushan Dr. C. Narayanareddy, 1991
- Prakruti Murali - Sri.Sri.Sri.Vijayendra Saraswati of Kanchipeetham, 1998

=== Awards ===
- Kala Saraswati - A.P.Kala Vedika, 1984
- Gaana Vibhushana - Parupalli Foundation, Vijayawada, 1998
- Pride of India - Mata Nirmala Devi of Sahaja Yoga Foundation, New Delhi, 2004
- Kala Ratna - Govt of Andhra Pradesh, 2016
- International Lions Life Award, Hyderabad, 2013
- Life Time Achievement Awards from Wichita Asian Association (WAA) Kansas, USA; Telugu Fine Arts Society (TFAS), New York, ANR Lifetime Achievement Award

== Compositions ==
He composed Saptaraaga Sagaram, a ragamalika based on 7 Carnatic ragas that included Charukesi, Abhogi, Abheri, Durga, Hamsanadam, Mohanam, and Desh. He also composed pallavis in Raagam Sankarabharam, Mohanam, and Jog.

== Cinema ==
Sivaprasad contributed whistle music in the following films:

- Telugu film ‘Neerajanam’ (Music director O.P.Nayyar)
- Sanskrit film Adi Shankaracharya (Music Director Dr. M.Balamuralikrishna)
- Kannada film ‘Kona Eedhaite’ (Music Director Hamsalekha)
- Hollywood film ‘Time Expired’.

== Discography ==
=== Carnatic classical ===
1. Annamacharya Keertanas on Whistle Titled -‘Seven Hills Whistle’- 2004.
2. Melodies of Tyagaraja - 2005
3. Melodies of Deekshitar - 2006
4. Bhadrachala Ramadasu Keertanalu – 2008
5. Melodies of Shamasastri – 2015
6. Tribute to Smt. M.S Subbulkshmi – 2017

=== Devotional music ===
1. Bhagavan Sri.Satyasaibaba Bhajanaamrutam, volumes I 2008
2. Bhagavan Sri.Satyasaibaba Bhajanaamrutam, volume II - 2009
3. Bhagavan Sri.Satyasaibaba Bhajanaamrutam, volume III-2010
4. SriKrishna Bhajanamrutam - 2011

=== Film music ===
1. Western Music On whistle - 2013
2. Old Classics Laahiri Laahiri Laahiri Lo(ANR Melodies) – 2010
3. Old Classics Himagiri Sogasululu (NTR Melodies) - 2011
4. Old Classics (Hindi Film Music titled Suhaana …Safar…)-2012

=== Concept albums ===
1. Rabindra Sangeet Aananda Dhara on Whistle
2. "My Nation – My Breath" - Patriotic Songs
3. Kavi Bharateeyar Songs on Whistle
4. Tribute to MS Amma - on the occasion of 101 Birthday Celebrations of Bharata Ratna M S Subbulakshmi
