= Muppalaneni =

Muppalaneni (Telugu: ముప్పలనేని) is a Telugu surname. Notable people with the surname include:

- Muppalaneni Seshagiri Rao (c. 1933–2019), Indian politician
- Muppalaneni Shiva (born 1968), Indian film director and writer
