= Puchalapalli =

Puchalapalli (Telugu: పుచ్చలపల్లి) is a Telugu surname.

Notable people with the surname include:

- Puchalapalli Sundarayya (1913–1985), CPI leader of Andhra Pradesh
- Puchalapalli Penchalaiah (born 1924), Parliament member from Nellore
