= Padmashree Kudumula =

Indian politician and teacher

Member of Parliament, Lok Sabha
- In office 1991 - 1996
- Preceded by: Puchalapalli Penchalaiah
- Succeeded by: Panabaka Lakshmi
- Constituency: Nellore

Padmashree Kudumula is a teacher and former member of the 10th Lok Sabha (1991–96), representing Nellore reserved constituency. She is affiliated to the Indian National Congress party.

== Early life ==
Kudumula was born in Nellore district on 24 September 1961 to Kudumula Meeraiah. She attended the Sri Venkateswara University, Nellore and holds B.Sc., B.Ed. and M.A. degrees in political science.

== Career ==
Before joining politics, Kudumula worked as a teacher. She is a social activist focusing on imparting education to the marginalised communities. In 1986, she became a member of the Indian National Congress (I) party and in 1991, Kudumula stood for election to the 10th Lok Sabha from Nellore reserved constituency as an official INC candidate. She polled 2,68,626 votes against her nearest rival's Telugu Desam Party's M. Nagabhushanamma, who was defeated by a margin of a 44,857 votes. During her tenure in the house, she served on a joint committee for 73rd Constitutional Amendment bill.

Kudumula served as a Member of Parliament till 1996, when INC made Lakshmi Panabaka its official candidate for that year's general election.
