= Kona Prabhakara Rao =

Indian politician (1916–1990)

12th Governor of Maharashtra
- In office 31 May 1985 – 2 April 1986
- Preceded by: Peer Mohammed (acting)
- Succeeded by: Dr. Shankar Dayal Sharma

3rd Governor of Sikkim
- In office 18 June 1984 – 30 May 1985
- Preceded by: Homi J. H. Taleyarkhan
- Succeeded by: Bhishma Narain Singh (additional charge)

8th Lieutenant Governor of Puducherry
- In office 12 September 1983 – 17 June 1984
- Preceded by: K.M. Chandy
- Succeeded by: S.L. Khurana (additional charge)

Member of Andhra Pradesh Legislative Assembly
- In office 1967–1983
- Preceded by: Vemmulapalli Srikrishna
- Succeeded by: C.V.Ramaraju(independent)
- Constituency: Bapatla (Assembly constituency)

Personal details
- Born: 10 July 1916; Bapatla, Madras Presidency now Bapatla, Bapatla district, Andhra Pradesh
- Died: 20 October 1990 (aged 74); Hyderabad, Andhra Pradesh (now Telangana)
- Political party: Indian National Congress
- Spouse: Padmavathi Rao
- Children: Kona Raghupathi (son)

Kona Prabhakara Rao (10 July 1916 – 20 October 1990) was an Indian politician. He was a member of the Indian National Congress party and was elected four times as Member of the Legislative Assembly from the Bapatla Assembly constituency.

== Early life and education ==
Kona Prabhakar Rao was born in Bapatla, Andhra Pradesh, into a wealthy Telugu Niyogi Brahmin family in Bapatla. He did most of his schooling in Bapatla. At the age of 16, Rao conducted a boycott of schools when late Motilal Nehru died. He was a social and political worker and took active part in the Salt Satyagraha movement and Quit India Movement of 1942. In Bapatla he organised a youth league and promoted the use of khadi.

A keen sportsman, Rao was tennis champion of the Bombay University in 1938. He organised the Shivaji Vyayam Mandali at Bapatla and some other places. He was a wrestler and badminton champion during his college days at Pune.

He graduated from the Loyola College, Madras and completed his law degree from the ILS Law College, Pune. He started practice as an Advocate in Bapatla in the composite Madras State in 1940.

Rao was actively associated with a large number of cultural organisations. He had in his earlier days produced, acted and directed many Telugu films, notable among them being Mangalasutra, Niraparadhi (1951), Nirdoshi, Drohi and Soudamini.

== Career ==
He was elected to the Andhra Pradesh Legislative Assembly for the first time in 1967 and later in 1972 and 1978. He was Speaker of the Assembly during 1980-81. He was President of the APCC(I). He was also Minister of Finance and Planning during the Chief Ministership of Bhavanam Venkatarami Reddy and Vijaya Bhaskara Reddy.

Rao was appointed Governor of the union territory of Pondicherry on 2 September 1983 and he continued in that post until June 1984. On 17 June 1984 he assumed the office of the Governor of Sikkim, and then succeeded Air Chief Marshal I. H. Latif, as the Governor of Maharashtra, on 30 May 1985.

In the area of education as the founder of the Bapatla Education Society he ensured several institutions evolved in his home town. He was responsible for bringing Krishna River water to the town of Bapatla, which ensured a lot of progression in the area of agriculture which was a prominent means of living for the town.

He died on 20 October 1990, at National Institute of Medical Sciences, Hyderabad due to cardio-respiratory failure. His son Kona Raghupathi was elected as MLA for Bapatla constituency.
