= Salagala Benjamin =

Indian politician (1927–2011)

Member of Parliament, Lok Sabha
- In office 1989-1991
- Preceded by: Chimata Sambu
- Succeeded by: Daggubati Venkateswara Rao
- Constituency: Bapatla

Personal details
- Born: 1927 Chirala, Prakasham district, Madras Presidency, British India (presently Andhra Pradesh, India)
- Died: 2011 (aged 83–84)
- Party: Indian National Congress

Salagala Benjamin (1927-2011) was an Indian politician. He was a Member of Parliament, representing Bapatla in the Lok Sabha, the lower house of India's Parliament, as a member of the Indian National Congress.
