= Vukkala Rajeswaramma =

Indian politician

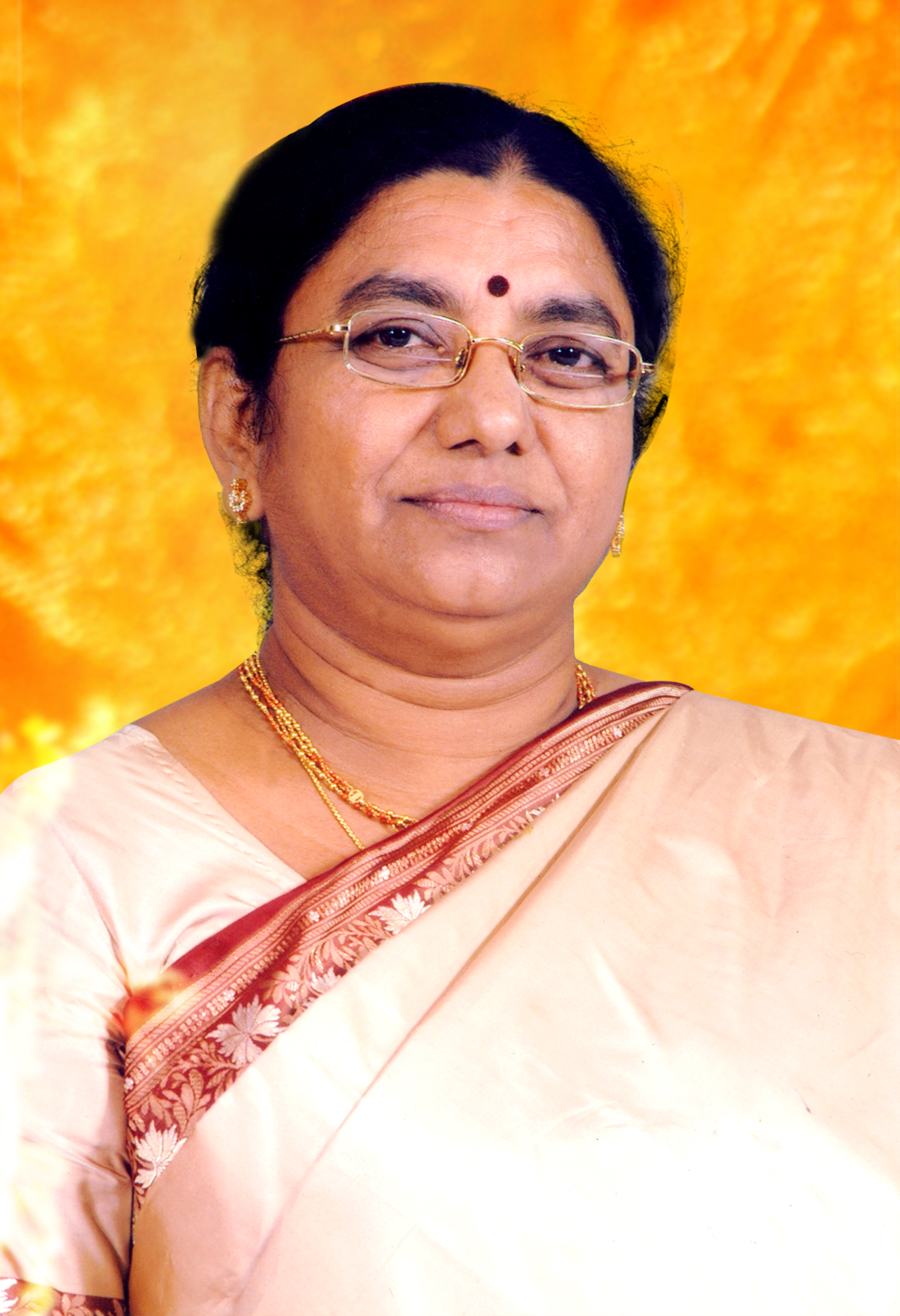

Member of Parliament, Lok Sabha
- In office 1999-2004
- Preceded by: Panabaka Lakshmi
- Succeeded by: Panabaka Lakshmi
- Constituency: Nellore

Personal details
- Born: 10 July 1948 (age 78)
- Died: 01 DECEMBER 2018 (Saturday)
- Party: Telugu Desam Party
- Spouse: Dr. V. Prakash Rao
- Education: Kurnool Medical College
- Profession: Politician

Vukkala Rajeswaramma (born 10 July 1948) is an Indian politician and a Member of Parliament elected from the Nellore constituency in the Indian state of Andhra Pradesh being a Telugu Desam Party candidate.

== Early life and education ==
Rajeswaramma was on born on 10 July 1948 in Atmakur in Nellore district in the Indian state of Andhra Pradesh. She is a graduate of Kurnool Medical College, Kurnool in M.B.B.S. She married V. Prakash Rao on 14 Jan 1970 and she has two sons.

== Career ==
In 1999, Rajeswaramma was elected a Member of Parliament to 13th Lok Sabha. She served as a member of Committee on Science and Technology, Environment and Forests from 1999-2000 and 2000–2004, as a member of Consultative Committee, Ministry of Human Resource Development.
