= Seshagiri Rao =

Indian politician (c.1933–2019)

Andhra Pradesh Legislative Assembly
- In office 1994–1999
- Preceded by: Chirala Govardhana Reddy
- Succeeded by: Anantha Varma Manthena
- Constituency: Bapatla

Personal details
- Born: c. 1933
- Died: 18 November 2019 (aged 86)
- Party: Indian National Congress

Muppalaneni Seshagiri Rao (c. 1933 – 18 November 2019) was an Indian politician belonging to Indian National Congress. He was a member of the Andhra Pradesh Legislative Assembly and Legislative Council.

== Biography ==
Rao was the president of Bapatla Educational Society and established the Bapatla Engineering College. He was elected as a member of the Andhra Pradesh Legislative Council in 1981. He was elected as a member of the Andhra Pradesh Legislative Assembly as a Telugu Desam Party candidate from Bapatla in 1994. Later, he joined Indian National Congress. He served as the president of the Guntur District Congress Committee and the secretary general of the Andhra Pradesh Congress Committee too.

Rao died on 18 November 2019 at the age of 86.
