= Kona Raghupathi =

Indian politician

Member of Andhra Pradesh Legislative Assembly
- In office 2014–2024
- Preceded by: Gade Venkata Reddy
- Succeeded by: Vegesana Narendra Varma
- Constituency: Bapatla

21st Deputy Speaker of Andhra Pradesh Legislative Assembly
- In office 18 June 2019 – 18 September 2022
- Preceded by: Mandali Buddha Prasad
- Succeeded by: Kolagatla Veera Bhadra Swamy

Personal details
- Party: YSR Congress Party
- Parent: Kona Prabhakara Rao (father)

Kona Raghupathi is an Indian politician from Andhra Pradesh, India. He represented the Bapatla constituency in the Legislative Assembly of Andhra Pradesh till 2024. He was elected to serve as the Member of the Legislative Assembly (MLA) for Bapatla Assembly constituency in Andhra Pradesh, India, in 2014. He represents the YSR Congress Party.

== Early life ==
Kona Raghupathi was born to Kona Prabhakara Rao, who was the former governor for Maharashtra and Sikkim states.

== Political career ==
In 2014, he contested from Bapatla Assembly constituency on behalf of YSR Congress Party and emerged victorious over Annam Satish Prabhakar of Telugu Desam Party in the 2014 Andhra Pradesh Legislative Assembly election. In 2019, he won as the MLA from Bapatla constituency from Andhra Pradesh. He is the deputy speaker of the Andhra Pradesh Legislative Assembly.
