= Bhavanarayana Temple, Bapatla =

Bhavanarayana Temple
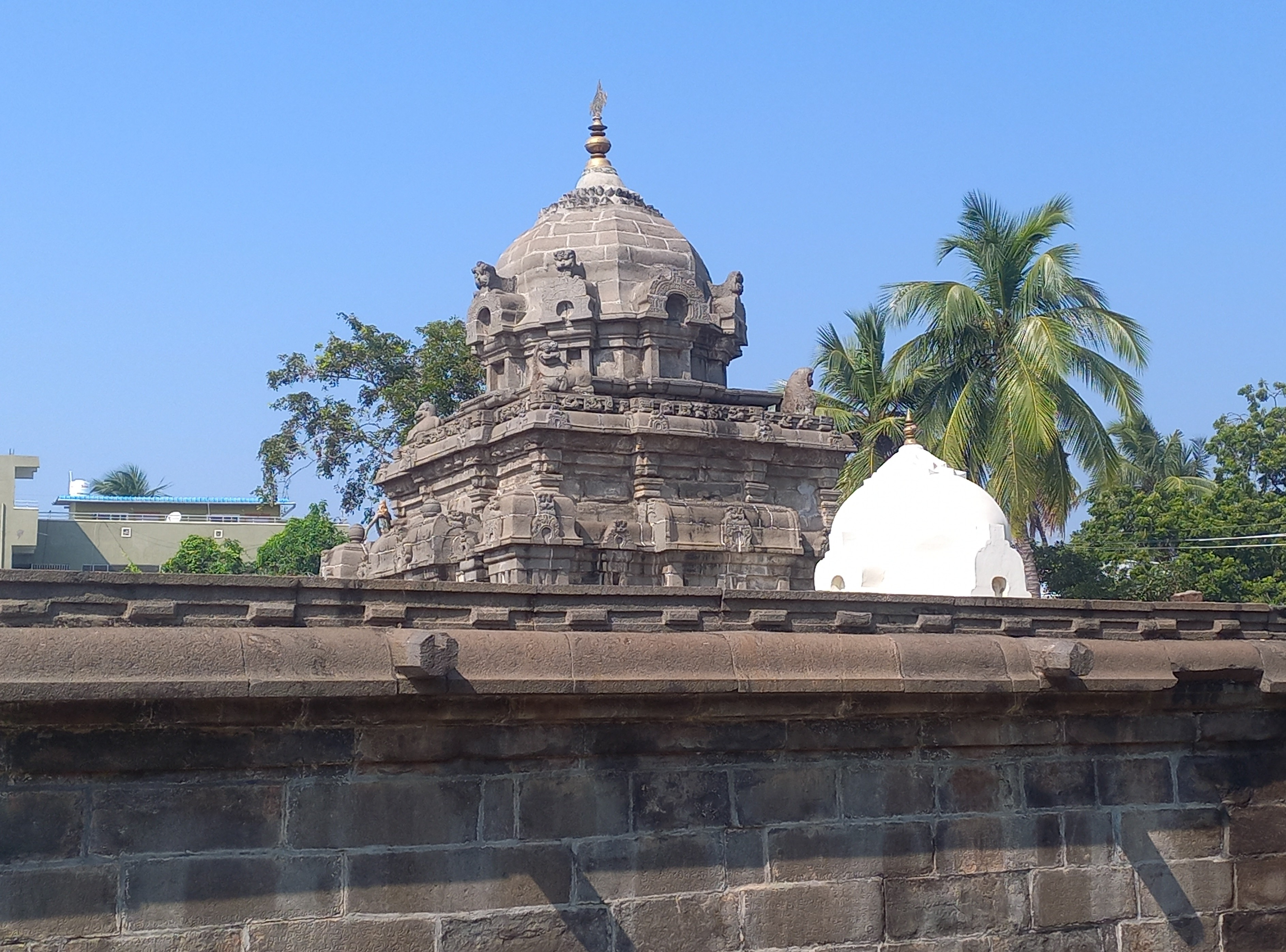

- Location in Andhra Pradesh

Religion
- Affiliation: Hinduism
- District: Bapatla
- Deity: Bhavanarayana
- Festival: Chariot Festival

Location
- Location: Bapatla
- State: Andhra Pradesh
- Country: India
- Coordinates: 15°54′21″N 80°28′04″E

Architecture
- Type: Southern Indian Hindu temple architecture
- Established: 15th Century CE
- Temple: 1
- Inscriptions: Telugu, Tamil, and Sanskrit

Bhavanarayana Temple is a temple in Bapatla of Bapatla district in the Indian state of Andhra Pradesh. The temple is dedicated to Lord Bhavanarayana and because of this temple the town of Bapatla got its name. It is one of the centrally protected monuments of national importance.

== History ==
The temple was constructed by vengi chalukya ruler kubja vishnu Vardhan and for this he got the title paramabhagavatha .
