= Daggubati Venkateswara Rao =

Indian politician

Member of Parliament, Rajya Sabha
- In office 2 April 1996 – 1 April 2002
- Preceded by: P. Upendra
- Succeeded by: Ravula Chandrasekhar Reddy
- Constituency: Andhra Pradesh

Member of Parliament, Lok Sabha
- In office 1991–1996
- Preceded by: Salagala Benjamin
- Succeeded by: Ummareddy Venkateswarlu
- Constituency: Bapatla

Member of Legislative Assembly, Andhra Pradesh
- In office 2004–2014
- Preceded by: Jagarlamudi Padmavathi
- Succeeded by: Yeluri Sambasiva Rao
- Constituency: Parchur
- In office 1983–1991
- Preceded by: Maddukuri Narayan Rao
- Succeeded by: Gade Venkata Reddy
- Constituency: Parchur

Personal details
- Born: 14 December 1953 (age 72) Karamchedu, Bapatla, Andhra Pradesh, India
- Other political affiliations: YSR Congress Party (2019–2023); Indian National Congress (2004–2014}); Anna Telugu Desam Party (1999–2004); Bharatiya Janata Party (1998–1999; 2014–2019); NTR Telugu Desam Party (Lakshmi Parvathi) (1996–1998); Telugu Desam Party (1983–1996)
- Spouse: Daggubati Purandeswari (m. 1979)
- Children: 2

Dr. Daggubati Venkateswara Rao, M.B., B.S., (born 14 December 1953) is a former member of the Indian National Congress.

== Personal life ==
Rao is the 2nd son-in-law in order for N. T. Rama Rao, actor and founder of the Telugu Desam Party (TDP). He is the son of Daggubati Chenchu Ramaiah. He married politician Daggubati Purandareswari on 9 May 1979. The couple have two children, Nivedita and Hitesh Chenchuram, a daughter and a son respectively.

== Career ==
Rao is an ex-Minister, ex-Member of Parliament and an ex-Member of the Andhra Pradesh Legislative Assembly representing Parchur constituency in Prakasham District up to 2014. He won the 2009 General Election by getting 73,691 votes and a majority of 2,776 votes. Rao was elected to the State Assembly in 1983, 1985, 1989, 2004, 2009 and to Lok Sabha (Indian lower house) in 1991–1996, and to the Rajya Sabha (Indian Upper House) in 1996. He was an independent member in the 2014 elections but in 2019 he joined the YSR Congress Party. He contested the 2019 Legislative Assembly elections from the Parchur Assembly Constituency in Prakasam district. He secured 95,429 votes (46.97%), but was defeated by the TDP candidate Yeluri Sambasiva Rao, who polled 97,076 votes (47.78%) — a narrow losing margin of just 1,647 votes.
