= Parchur Assembly constituency =

Constituency of the Andhra Pradesh Legislative Assembly, India

Coordinates: 15.97°N 80.27°E

Parchur
- Constituency No. 104 for the Andhra Pradesh Legislative Assembly
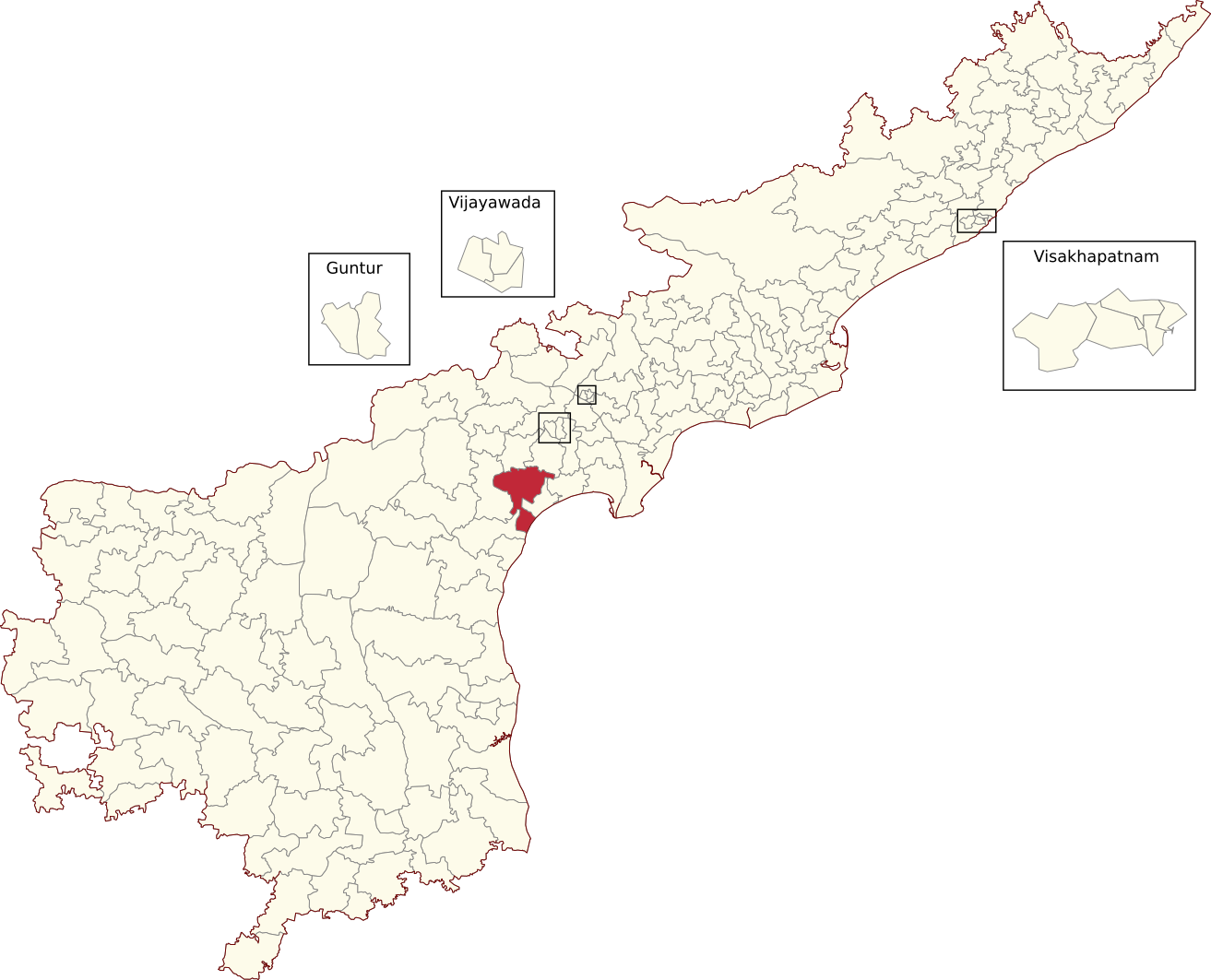
- Location of Parchur Assembly constituency within Andhra Pradesh

Constituency details
- Country: India
- Region: South India
- State: Andhra Pradesh
- District: Bapatla
- Lok Sabha constituency: Bapatla
- Established: 1955
- Total electors: 2,02,274
- Reservation: None

Member of Legislative Assembly
- 16th Andhra Pradesh Legislative Assembly
- Incumbent Yeluri Sambasiva Rao
- Party: TDP
- Alliance: NDA
- Elected year: 2024

Parchur Assembly constituency is a constituency in Bapatla district of Andhra Pradesh that elects representatives to the Andhra Pradesh Legislative Assembly in India. It is one of the seven assembly segments of Bapatla Lok Sabha constituency.

Yeluri Sambasiva Rao is the current MLA of the constituency, having won the 2019 Andhra Pradesh Legislative Assembly election from Telugu Desam Party. As of 2019, there are a total of 2,02,274 electors in the constituency. The constituency was established in 1955, as per the Delimitation Orders (1955).

== Mandals ==
Mandal
Yeddanapudi
Parchur
Karamchedu
Inkollu
Chinaganjam
Martur

== Members of the Legislative Assembly ==
Year	Member	Political party
1955	Kolla Ramaiah	Indian National Congress
1962	Naraharisetty Venkatswamy	Communist Party of India
1967	Gade Venkata Reddy	Indian National Congress
1972	Maddukuri Narayana rao	Independent politician
1978	Maddukuri Narayana rao	Indian National Congress (I)
1983	Daggubati Venkateswara Rao	Telugu Desam Party
1985	Daggubati Venkateswara Rao	Telugu Desam Party
1989	Daggubati Venkateswara Rao	Telugu Desam Party
1991	Gade Venkata Reddy	Indian National Congress
1994	Gade Venkata Reddy	Indian National Congress
1999	Jagarlamudi Lakshmi Padmavathi	Telugu Desam Party
2004	Daggubati Venkateswara Rao	Indian National Congress
2009	Daggubati Venkateswara Rao	Indian National Congress
2014	Yeluri Sambasiva Rao	Telugu Desam Party
2019	Yeluri Sambasiva Rao	Telugu Desam Party
2024	Yeluri Sambasiva Rao	Telugu Desam Party

== Election results ==
=== 1955 ===
1955 Andhra Pradesh Legislative Assembly election: Parchur
Party	Candidate	Votes	%	±%
INC	Kolla Ramaiah	24,076	56.45	
CPI	Kolla Venkaiah	18,575	43.55	
Majority		5,501	12.90	
Turnout		42,651	78.84	
INC win (new seat)				

=== 1962 ===
1962 Andhra Pradesh Legislative Assembly election: Parchur
Party	Candidate	Votes	%	±%
CPI	Naraharisetty Venkatswamy	20,948	46.09	
INC	Maddukuri Narayana Rao	12,891	35.64	
Majority		8,057	17.73	
Turnout		46,775	73.52	
CPI gain from INC		Swing		

=== 1967 ===
1967 Andhra Pradesh Legislative Assembly election: Parchur
Party	Candidate	Votes	%	±%
INC	Gade Venkata Reddy	28,446	56.27	
CPI(M)	Naraharisetty Venkataswamy	18,019	35.64	
Majority		10,427	20.63	
Turnout		52,484	76.11	
INC gain from CPI		Swing		

=== 1972 ===
1972 Andhra Pradesh Legislative Assembly election: Parchur
Party	Candidate	Votes	%	±%
Independent	Maddukuri Narayana rao	31,038	50.25	
INC	Gade Venkata Reddy	30,728	49.75	
Majority		310	0.50	
Turnout		63,164	81.26	
Independent gain from INC		Swing		

=== 1978 ===
1978 Andhra Pradesh Legislative Assembly election: Parchur
Party	Candidate	Votes	%	±%
INC(I)	Maddukuri Narayana rao	38,024	48.44	
JP	Gade Venkata Reddy	33,087	42.15	
Majority		4,937	6.29	
Turnout		79,839	79.82	
INC(I) gain from INC		Swing		

=== 1983 ===
1983 Andhra Pradesh Legislative Assembly election: Parchur
Party	Candidate	Votes	%	±%
TDP	Daggubati Venkateswara Rao	41,537	53.29	
INC	Gade Venkata Reddy	34,923	44.81	
Majority		6,614	8.49	
Turnout		78,968	73.70	
TDP gain from INC(I)		Swing		

=== 1985 ===
1985 Andhra Pradesh Legislative Assembly election: Parchur
Party	Candidate	Votes	%	±%
TDP	Daggubati Venkateswara Rao	43,905	49.93	
INC	Gade Venkata Reddy	42,828	48.71	
Majority		1,077	1.22	
Turnout		88,783	75.47	
TDP hold		Swing		

=== 1989 ===
1989 Andhra Pradesh Legislative Assembly election: Parchur
Party	Candidate	Votes	%	±%
TDP	Daggubati Venkateswara Rao	49,060	53.25	
Independent	Gade Venkata Reddy	43,232	45.84	
Majority		6,828	7.41	
Turnout		94,857	68.20	
TDP hold		Swing		

=== 1991 (By-poll) ===
1991 Andhra Pradesh Legislative Assembly by-election: Parchur
Party	Candidate	Votes	%	±%
INC	Gade Venkata Reddy	52,024	58.10	
TDP	Damacherla Anjaneyulu	37,514	41.90	
Majority		10,427	16.21	
Turnout				
INC gain from TDP		Swing		

=== 1994 ===
1994 Andhra Pradesh Legislative Assembly election: Parchur
Party	Candidate	Votes	%	±%
INC	Gade Venkata Reddy	45,843	49.77	
TDP	Brahmananda Reddy Battula	43,641	47.38	
Majority		2,202	2.39	
Turnout		93,127	76.22	
INC hold		Swing		

=== 1999 ===
1999 Andhra Pradesh Legislative Assembly election: Parchur
Party	Candidate	Votes	%	±%
TDP	Lakshmi Padmavathi Jagarlamudi	48,574	50.21	
INC	Gade Venkata Reddy	46,365	47.93	
Majority		2,209	2.28	
Turnout		98,282	70.01	
TDP gain from INC		Swing		

=== 2004 ===
2004 Andhra Pradesh Legislative Assembly election: Parchur
Party	Candidate	Votes	%	±%
INC	Daggubati Venkateswara Rao	54,987	57.10	+9.17
TDP	Chenchu Garataiah Bachina	39,441	40.95	−9.26
Majority		15,546	16.15	
Turnout		96,304	80.28	+11.37
INC gain from TDP		Swing		

=== 2009 ===
2009 Andhra Pradesh Legislative Assembly election: Parchur
Party	Candidate	Votes	%	±%
INC	Daggubati Venkateswara Rao	73,691	43.39	−13.71
TDP	Gottipati Narasimha Rao	70,731	41.65	+0.70
PRP	Sandu Purna Chandra Rao	19,056	11.22	
Majority		2,960	1.74	
Turnout		169,822	79.28	−1.00
INC hold		Swing		

=== 2014 ===
2014 Andhra Pradesh Legislative Assembly election: Parchur
Party	Candidate	Votes	%	±%
TDP	Yeluri Sambasiva Rao	97,248	51.65	
YSRCP	Gottipati Bharat Kumar	86,473	45.93	
Majority		10,775	5.72	
Turnout		189,033	88.17	+8.89
TDP gain from INC		Swing		

=== 2019 ===
2019 Andhra Pradesh Legislative Assembly election: Parchur
Party	Candidate	Votes	%	±%
TDP	Yeluri Sambasiva Rao	97,076	47.78	
YSRCP	Daggubati Venkateswara Rao	95,429	46.97	
Majority		1,647	0.81	
Turnout		203,155	88.24	
TDP hold		Swing		

=== 2024 ===
2024 Andhra Pradesh Legislative Assembly election: Parchur
Party	Candidate	Votes	%	±%
TDP	Yeluri Sambasiva Rao	110,575	54.67	
YSRCP	Yadam Balaji	86,562	42.79	
INC	Nallagorla Siva Srilakshmi Jyothi	2,293	1.13	
NOTA	None Of The Above	1289	0.64	
Majority		24,013	11.87	
Turnout		2,02,274		
TDP hold		Swing		

== See also ==
- List of constituencies of Andhra Pradesh Legislative Assembly
