= Bapatla =

Bapatla Bhavapattam, Bhavapattu, Bhavapattanam, Bhavapuri
- District Headquarter; Municipal City
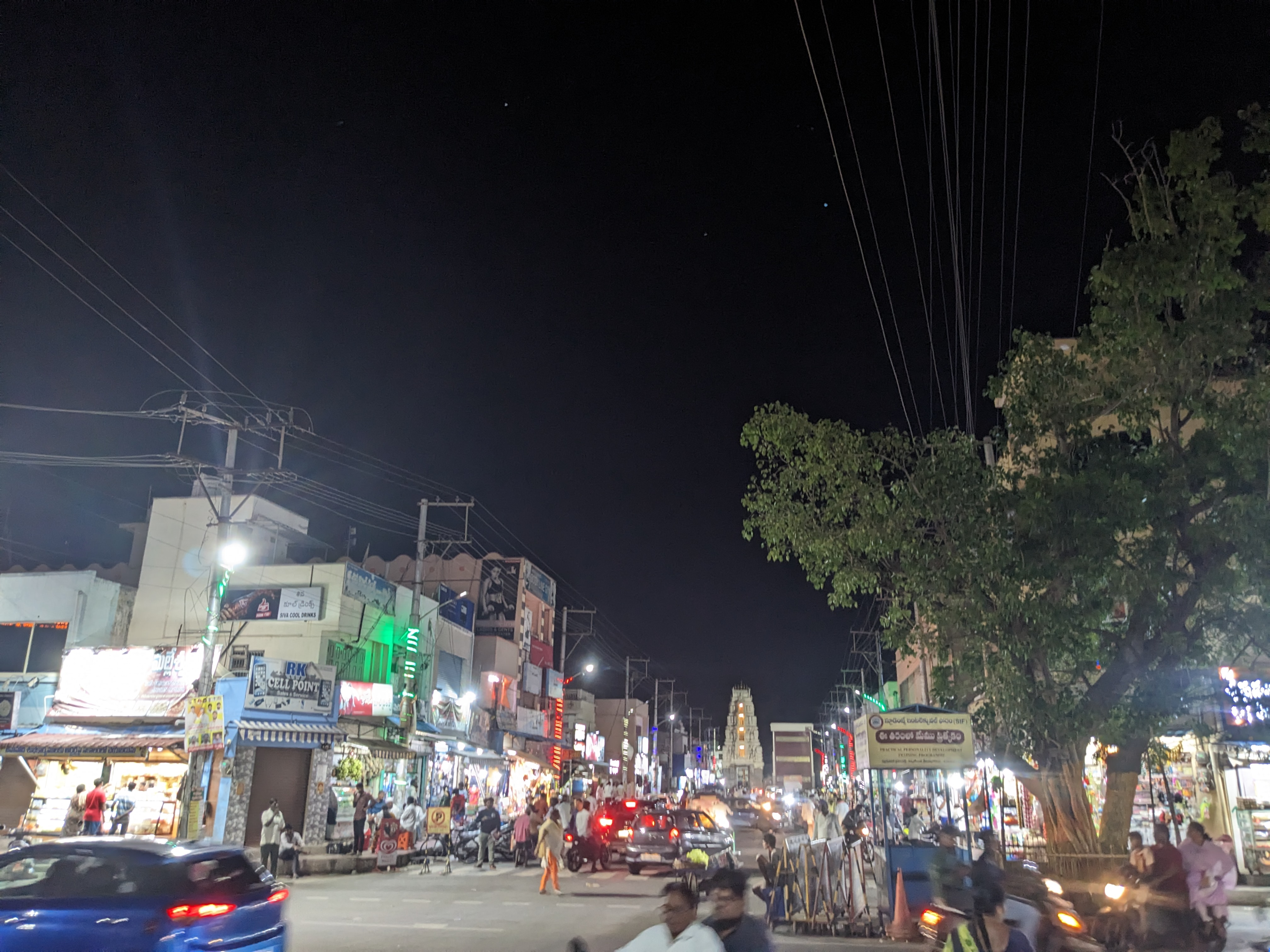
- Bapatla town at night

- Location in Andhra Pradesh, India
- Coordinates: 15°54′16″N 80°28′3″E
- Country: India
- State: Andhra Pradesh
- District: Bapatla
- Mandal: Bapatla
- Named for: Bhavanarayana Swamy

Government
  - Type: Municipal council
  - Body: Bapatla Municipality
  - MLA: Vegesana Narendra Varma

Area
  - Total: 17.92 km^{2} (6.92 sq mi)
- Elevation: 6 m (20 ft)

Population (2011)
  - Total: 107,000
  - Density: 5,970/km^{2} (15,500/sq mi)

Languages
  - Official: Telugu
- Time zone: UTC+5:30 (IST)
- PIN: 522 101
- Vehicle registration: AP–07
- Lok Sabha constituency: Bapatla (SC)
- Assembly constituency: Bapatla
- Website: bapatla.ap.gov.in, bapatla.cdma.ap.gov.in/en, manabapatla.info

Bapatla is a town and district headquarters of Bapatla district in the Indian state of Andhra Pradesh. It is a municipality and the mandal headquarters of Bapatla mandal of Bapatla revenue division. The nearest towns and cities to Bapatla are Chirala, Ponnur, Tenali and Bapatla district of 17 km, 22 km, 50 km and 53 km respectively.

== Etymology ==
The town was formerly known as Bhavapattana,< Bhavapattu and Bhavapatta. The names were derived from the Bhavanarayana Temple located in the town. Later, these names became the present name of Bapatla.

== Geography ==
The coordinates of the town are 15°54′16″N 80°28′3″E and is located at an altitude of 8 mts from the coast of Bay of Bengal.

== Climate ==
The town has tropical climate with the average annual temperatures recorded at 28.4 °C (83.1 °F). Hot summers and cool winters are observed due to its proximity to the coast of Bay of Bengal. It receives both South west monsoon and North-east monsoon as well. The precipitation is very high with an annual rainfall of about 854 millimetres (34 in) and the month of October receives a maximum rainfall of 197 millimetres (8 in). It is most affected by the cyclonic storms that occur on the east coast.

Climate data for Bapatla (1991–2020, extremes 1978–2020)
Month	Jan	Feb	Mar	Apr	May	Jun	Jul	Aug	Sep	Oct	Nov	Dec	Year
Record high °C (°F)	35.0 (95.0)	35.4 (95.7)	39.3 (102.7)	43.7 (110.7)	47.4 (117.3)	47.0 (116.6)	40.8 (105.4)	41.0 (105.8)	38.7 (101.7)	36.0 (96.8)	35.5 (95.9)	33.2 (91.8)	47.4 (117.3)
Mean daily maximum °C (°F)	29.6 (85.3)	30.9 (87.6)	32.7 (90.9)	34.1 (93.4)	37.8 (100.0)	37.3 (99.1)	34.8 (94.6)	33.9 (93.0)	33.3 (91.9)	31.8 (89.2)	30.5 (86.9)	29.7 (85.5)	33.0 (91.4)
Mean daily minimum °C (°F)	17.6 (63.7)	19.2 (66.6)	22.2 (72.0)	25.8 (78.4)	27.6 (81.7)	27.0 (80.6)	25.8 (78.4)	25.3 (77.5)	25.2 (77.4)	23.9 (75.0)	21.3 (70.3)	18.3 (64.9)	23.2 (73.8)
Record low °C (°F)	11.6 (52.9)	11.8 (53.2)	14.8 (58.6)	19.6 (67.3)	16.1 (61.0)	21.7 (71.1)	21.3 (70.3)	20.4 (68.7)	18.4 (65.1)	17.9 (64.2)	12.4 (54.3)	11.1 (52.0)	11.1 (52.0)
Average rainfall mm (inches)	16.2 (0.64)	10.6 (0.42)	0.3 (0.01)	18.2 (0.72)	43.8 (1.72)	107.2 (4.22)	133.6 (5.26)	176.7 (6.96)	205.3 (8.08)	192.4 (7.57)	99.2 (3.91)	25.1 (0.99)	1,028.5 (40.49)
Average rainy days	0.6	0.6	0.1	0.7	2.0	6.0	8.2	9.4	8.5	8.3	3.8	1.2	49.4
Average relative humidity (%) (at 17:30 IST)	66	66	68	70	62	57	61	66	73	77	75	68	67
Source: India Meteorological Department

== Demographics ==
As of 2011 Census of India, the town had a population of 100300 with 98,216 households. The total population constituted 54,385 males and 56,392 females —a sex ratio of 1058 females per 1000 males, higher than the national average of 940 per 1000. Bapatla is second largest populated town in Bapatla District, Chirala Town is the largest populated Town in newly formed Bapatla District.

6,182 children were in the age group of 0–6 years, of which 3,156 were boys and 3,026 were girls—a ratio of 959 per 1000. The average literacy rate stood at 80.67% with 52,106 literates, significantly higher than the national average of 73.00%.

== Governance ==
=== Bapatla district collectorate ===
The very first Bapatla district Collector is K.Vijaya krishnan IAS.

- 2022-

=== Civic administration ===
Bapatla Municipality was established in 1951. It oversees the civic needs of the town like, water supply, sewage, and garbage collection. It is a Grade–I municipality which has an extent of 17.92 km^{2} (6.92 mi^{2}) with 34 wards.

=== Utility services ===
Kommamuru and Poondla channels of the Krishna Western Delta system provide irrigation water to Bapatla and the surrounding areas.

=== Politics ===
Bapatla, being a part of Bapatla mandal, falls under Bapatla assembly constituency of Andhra Pradesh Legislative Assembly. Vegesana Narendra Varma Raju of Telugu Desam Party is the present MLA of the constituency. The assembly segment is in turn a part of Bapatla (SC) lok sabha constituency and the present MP is Tenneti Krishna Prasad of the Telugu Desam Party.

=== Key points ===
Bapatla district collectorate – Mr. J. Venkata Murali IAS.

Bapatla Sub-Division of police – A.Srinivas.

Member of Parliament – Krishna Prasad Tenneti

Member of the Legislative Assembly – Vegesana Narendra Varma

== Economy ==
Aquaculture and agriculture are the main occupations of the coastal areas of the town. Aquaculture involves pisciculture and the farming is dominant with paddy cultivation. The Cairn India have conducted oil drilling onshore of Bapatla which is a part of KG basin stretch.

Tourism also plays a role in generating revenue with the presence of Suryalanka Beach near the town, operated by the Andhra Pradesh Tourism Development Corporation.

== Culture ==
- The Clock Tower, built in 1948, was demolished for road extension and started to be rebuilt in December 2017.
- The town has various religious structures depicting the presence of different worshipers, such as Bhavanarayana Temple and Centenary Baptist Zion Church
- The Suryalanka Beach connected by the Beach Road of the town hosts the Bhavapuri Beach Festival every year.

== Memorials ==
The Edward Coronation Memorial Town Hall was built in 1905 in coronation of the then Emperor of India, Edward VII.

- On the road leading to the Suryalanka beach is a Town Hall in this coastal town. Constructed to commemorate the coronation of Edward VII, Emperor of India, the Town Hall which still retains its shape after 113 years, continues to hold the centre stage in the town and is a place of recreation. The Hall was constructed with public donations without any assistance from the government or local funds. The Edward Coronation Memorial Town Hall was inaugurated by Broodie, then Guntur district Collector on 17 July 1905. The Hall witnessed many historic moments including the first Andhra Conference in 1913 which paved the way for the creation of a movement for linguistic States. It hosted the First Andhra Provincial Conference in 1913 where a clarion call was given for a separate Telugu State, under the presidentship of Bayya Narasimheswara Sarma. All important meetings of public nature were held in the compound and it had become a hub for all cultural, literary and political activities. Leaders like Mahatma Gandhi, Pandit Jawaharlal Nehru, Babu Rajendra Prasad, Jayaprakash Narayan, Dange and many other Andhra leaders visited it and addressed people. The Victoria Diamond Jubilee Club and News Paper Club started in 1896 in Bapatla were merged with the Town Hall in 1905.

== Transport ==
The town has a total road length of 165.50 km (102.84 mi).

Until 1963, private Bus Services were the sole source of transport in Bapatla. APSRTC started operations in 1964 with its bus services to various parts of the state from Bapatla bus station. The town has frequent buses to Vijayawada, Guntur, Ponnur, Repalle and Chirala.

- The National Highway 216 passes through the town, which connects Digamarru and Ongole. State Highway 48 also known as Guntur-Bapatla-Chirala (G.B.C) Road passes through Ponnur and connects the town with the district headquarters, Bapatla district.
- Bapatla railway station is located on the New Delhi-Chennai mainline & Howrah-Chennai main line of Indian Railways. It is a –A category station and was recognized as an Adarsh station in the Vijayawada railway division of South Central Railway zone.

== Education and research ==
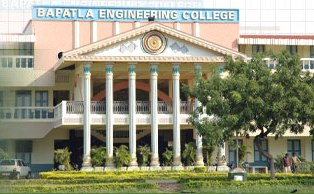
Bapatla Engineering College

The primary and secondary school education is imparted by government, aided and private schools, under the School Education Department of the state. The mediums of instruction followed by different schools are English and Telugu.

The town has many schools, colleges and universities. The Agricultural College was established on 11 July 1945 by Government of Composite Madras State. It is the oldest of all the colleges under Acharya N. G. Ranga Agricultural University. College of Agricultural Engineering & College of Food Science and Technology under Acharya N. G. Ranga Agricultural University, Bapatla Polytechnic College, and Bapatla College of Arts & Sciences, Bapatla Engineering College, & Bapatla Women' Engineering College under Nagarjuna University are other prominent ones.

=== Research and defense establishments ===
An automatic weather station of India Meteorological Department is located in the town which records the temperatures. BPT 5204 (rice variety of Sona Masuri), BPT 2270 (Bhavapuri Sannalu) and BPT 2231 (Akshaya) were developed at this rice research unit. There are also a number of research institutes of this agricultural university, such as the AICRP on Betelvine, and a cashew research station.

=== Air Force base ===
Suryalanka Indian Air Force base on the shore of the Bay of Bengal is located near Bapatla. The base carries out activities such as testing missiles and guided weapon firing range.

== Notable people ==
- Stanam Narasimha Rao, Indian Theatre Artist and Cinema actor, well known for his female roles in the first two decades of Indian cinema, and a Padmari awardee
- Komaravolu Sivaprasad, whistle singer
- kanuparthi Vara Lakshmamma, was a Freedom Fighter, writer & Social Activist. She established Stree Hitaishini Mandali.
- Nori Gopala Krishna Murthy was a popular Civil Engineer known for his contributions to Koyna Hydro Electric Project and Bhakra Nangal Dam. He was honored with Padmasri and Padma Bhushan by the Government of India.

== See also ==
- List of urban local bodies in Andhra Pradesh
