= Krishna Prasad Tenneti =

Indian politician (born 1960)

Member of Parliament, Lok Sabha
- Incumbent
- Assumed office 4 June 2024
- Preceded by: Nandigam Suresh
- Constituency: Bapatla, Andhra Pradesh

Member of Panel of Chairpersons (Lok Sabha)
- Incumbent
- Assumed office 1 July 2024 Serving with Sandhya Ray, Dilip Saikia, Jagdambika Pal, Kakoli Ghosh Dastidar, A. Raja, Selja Kumari, P. C. Mohan, Awadhesh Prasad, N. K. Premachandran
- Appointed by: Om Birla

Personal details
- Born: 2 March 1960 (age 66)
- Party: Telugu Desam Party
- Spouse: Sirisha Kumari Tenneti (m. 1990)
- Children: 2
- Education: B.Tech. M.B.A.
- Alma mater: N I.T. Warangal; I.I.M. Ahmedabad
- Occupation: Retired civil servant; politician
- Awards: Police Medal; President's Police Medal

Military service
- Rank: Director General of Police

Krishna Prasad Tenneti (born 2 March 1960) is an Indian politician, a retired IPS officer and the elected candidate of Lok Sabha from the Bapatla constituency as a Member of Parliament of the 18th Lok Sabha and also serves as a member of the panel of chairpersons. Krishna Prasad serves as the member of the panel of chairpersons of the house and helps in the smooth running of the Lok Sabha. He is a member of the Telugu Desam Party.

He is a committee member of the Atma Nirbhar Skill Summit 2020. He also serves as a mentor for venture funding and incubation organizations like Image. He is an advisor for the Bharat Education Excellence Award 2025.

== Early life and education ==
He was born in 1960 in Hyderabad, his family hails from Razole, East Godavari, and belongs to the Dalit community. His father's name was Late Subbaiah Tenneti and his mother’s name was Vijaya Laxmi Tenneti who were both teachers. He is married to Sirisha Kumari Tenneti, who is an Intellectual Property Attorney advocate and he has two daughters.

He holds a Bachelor of Engineering from the National Institute of Technology, Warangal with Mechanical Engineering Stream, and a PGDM from Indian Institute of Management Ahmedabad in 1985. He also obtained an LLB degree from Osmania University in 2016 and is pursuing his PhD in Sustainable Urban Mobility.

== Police and Foundation Career ==
He is an Indian Police Service officer of 1986 belonging to the Andhra Pradesh cadre until 2014 and the Telangana cadre from 2014 until his retirement. He is on the Board of Governors, at the National Institute of Technology, Jamshedpur and Director of APPA. He adopted Yerravalli village and donated 42 bicycles to girl children to help them pursue higher education.

He runs an NGO called Krishna Prasad Foundation. Through the Foundation, he also hosted Atma Nirbhar Skill Summit to help promote entrepreneurship and worked to mobilise medical equipment during the COVID with the support of American India Foundation.

== Parliamentary career ==
Krishna Prasad Tenneti is an Indian politician representing Bapatla constituency in Andhra Pradesh as a member of the Telugu Desam Party (TDP). He was elected to the 18th Lok Sabha in June 2024, beginning his first term as a Member of Parliament. As a member of the 18th Lok Sabha, Tenneti Krishna Prasad serves on the Committee on Home Affairs.

During his first year in office (June 2024 to March 2025), Tenneti maintained an attendance rate of 90%, which exceeded both the national average (87%) and the state average (84%). He participated in 11 parliamentary debates, including discussions on railway grants, the Oilfields Amendment Bill, constitutional matters, and budget sessions.

Tenneti has been particularly active in parliamentary questioning, raising 63 questions across diverse ministries including Education, Water Resources, Railways, Social Justice, Rural Development, and Health. His questions focused on infrastructure development, welfare schemes, skill development initiatives, and regional concerns specific to Andhra Pradesh. A consistent advocate for his constituency, Tenneti made special mentions regarding the Jal Jeevan Mission implementation in Bapatla and requested expediting the establishment of educational institutions including Jawahar Navodaya Vidyalaya and Kasturba Gandhi Balika Vidyalayas in his parliamentary constituency.

== Publications ==
- In 2006, he authored Trafficking in Persons: Tip of the Iceberg, published by the United Nations(UNIFEM). His research highlighted that children outside the schooling system are vulnerable to trafficking, leading to the Right to Education Act 2009 (RTE).
- In 2002, he authored a document Malupu, a poverty alleviation program that provided up-skilling to 162,000 BPL leather artisans in CLRI Madras.

== Medals ==
- He was decorated with Indian Police Medal, President’s Police Medal, and Antrik Suraksha Seva Padak for Anti-Naxal work.

== See also ==
- 18th Lok Sabha
