= Nandigam Suresh =

Indian politician

Member of Parliament, Lok Sabha
- In office 2019–2024
- Preceded by: Malyadri Sriram
- Succeeded by: Krishna Prasad Tenneti
- Constituency: Bapatla

Personal details
- Born: 15 June 1976 (age 49) Uddandarayunipalem, Guntur district, Andhra Pradesh
- Party: YSR Congress Party

Nandigam Suresh is an Indian politician. He was elected to the Lok Sabha, lower house of the Parliament of India from Bapatla, Andhra Pradesh in the 2019 Indian general election as a member of the YSR Congress Party.

== Early life ==
Mr. Suresh Nandigama was born in Uddandarayunipalem village in Guntur district of Andhra Pradesh state to a poor agriculture labour family which gave him exposure to problems being faced by farmers at a very young age. At the age of 15 he gave up on his education and moved to Vijayawada to work as a photographer to support his family financially.
