= Panabaka Lakshmi =

Indian politician (born 1958)

Dr. Panabaka Lakshmi
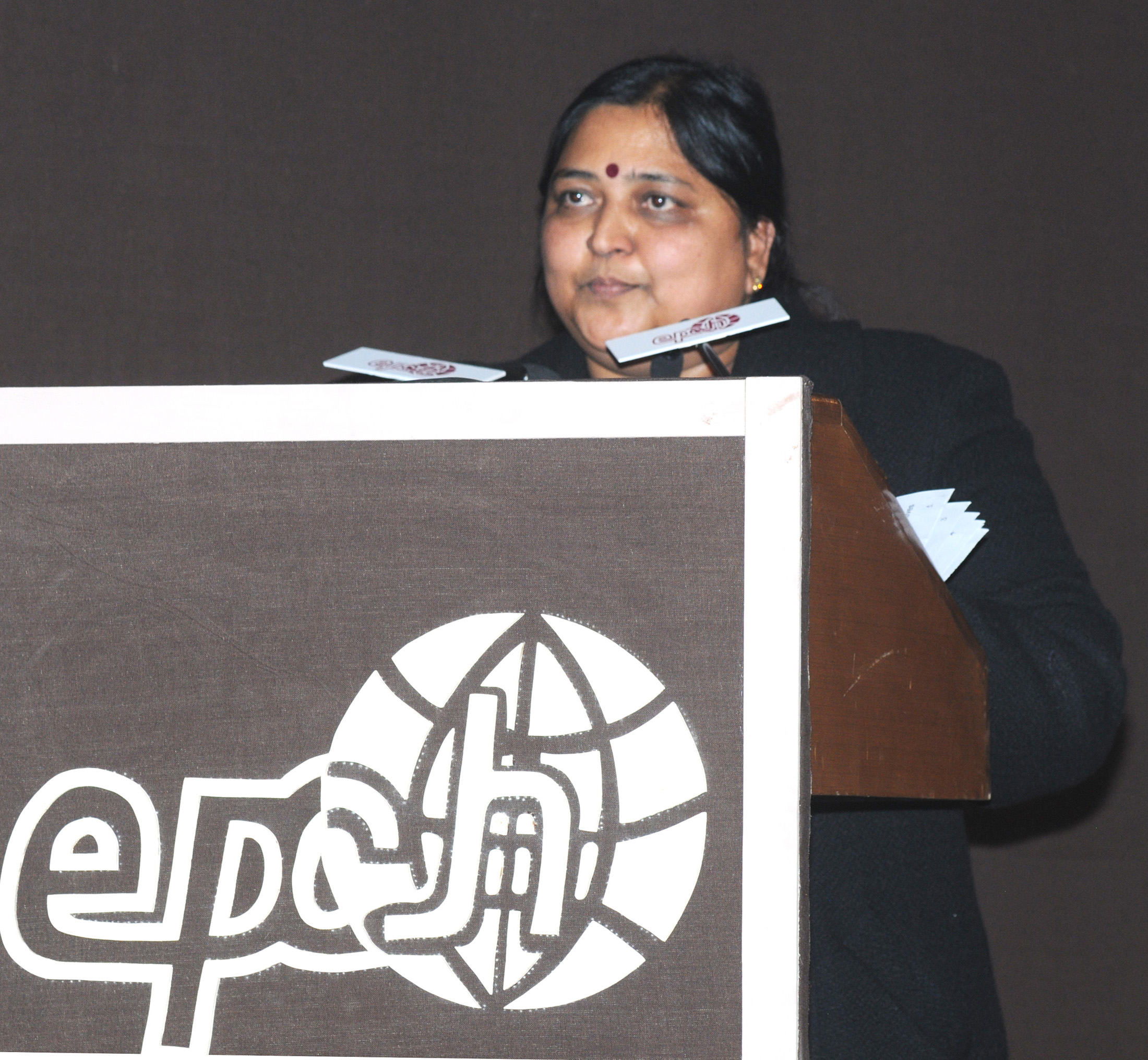

Union Minister of State for Textiles
- In office 28 May 2009 – 26 May 2014
- Prime Minister: Manmohan Singh
- Minister: Dayanidhi Maran; Anand Sharma
- Preceded by: E. V. K. S. Elangovan
- Succeeded by: Ajay Tamta

Union Minister of State for Health & Family Welfare
- In office 23 May 2004 – 28 May 2009
- Prime Minister: Manmohan Singh
- Succeeded by: Dinesh Trivedi

Member of Parliament, Lok Sabha
- In office 16 May 2009 – 16 May 2014
- Preceded by: Daggubati Purandareswari
- Succeeded by: Malyadri Sriram
- Constituency: Bapatla
- In office 13 May 2004 – 16 May 2009
- Preceded by: Vukkala Rajeswaramma
- Succeeded by: Mekapati Rajamohan Reddy
- Constituency: Nellore
- In office 9 May 1996 – 11 October 1999
- Preceded by: Padmashree Kudumula
- Succeeded by: Vukkala Rajeswaramma
- Constituency: Nellore

Personal details
- Born: 6 October 1958 (age 67) Kavali, Andhra Pradesh
- Party: Telugu Desam Party (From 2019)
- Other political affiliations: Indian National Congress (Till 2019)
- Spouse: Panabaka Krishnaiah
- Children: 2 daughters

Dr. Panabaka Lakshmi (born 6 October 1958) is an Indian politician and former Union Minister of State for Health and Family Welfare (2004-2009) and Union Minister of State for Textile (2009-2012). She represents the Bapatla constituency of Andhra Pradesh and was a member of the Indian National Congress in combined Andhra Pradesh. Now she is a part of Telugu Desam Party (TDP).

== Personal life ==
Dr. Panabaka Lakshmi was born in Kavali, Nellore (Andhra Pradesh) and married Dr. P. Krishnaiah, ex I.R.T.S. She has two daughters. She completed her M.A. in Public Administration from Andhra University.

== Career ==
She was elected to the 11th, 12th, and 14th Lok Sabha from Nellore and to 15th Lok Sabha from Bapatla. She was the Minister of State in the Ministry of Health and Family Welfare (2004–09), Ministry of Petroleum and Natural Gas, and Ministry of Textiles (2009–14) in UPA Govt.

She unsuccessfully contested 2019 Lok Sabha elections from Tirupati as a TDP candidate against Balli Durga Prasad Rao of YSRCP. In 2021, she also unsuccessfully contested Lok Sabha By-elections from same Tirupati seat, which is vacant following the demise of sitting MP Balli Durga Prasad Rao.

== Electoral History ==
=== Lok Sabha ===
Year	Constituency	Party	Votes	%	Opponent	Party	Votes	%	Result	Margin	%
1996	Nellore	INC	269,498	39.62	T. Prapancha Bhanu Raju	CPI(M)	201,313	29.59	Won	+68,185	+10.03
1998	Nellore	INC	296,731	40.06	Buduru Swarnalatha	CPI(M)	250,204	33.78	Won	+46,527	+6.28
1999	Nellore	INC	340,713	44.26	Rajeswaramma Vukkala	TDP	381,166	49.51	Lost	−40,453	−5.25
2004	Nellore	INC	450,129	53.81	Balakondaiah Karupotala	BJP	321,905	38.48	Won	+128,224	+15.33
2009	Bapatla	INC	460,757	44.15	Malyadri Sriram	TDP	391,419	37.51	Won	+69,338	+6.64
2014	Bapatla	INC	23,072	1.94	Malyadri Sriram	TDP	578,145	48.74	Lost	−555,073	−46.80
2019	Tirupati	TDP	494,501	37.56	Balli Durga Prasad Rao	YSRCP	722,877	54.91	Lost	−228,376	−17.35
2021^	Tirupati	TDP	354,516	32.09	Maddila Gurumoorthy	YSRCP	626,108	56.67	Lost	−271,592	−24.58
