= Yeluri Sambasiva Rao =

Indian Businessman

Member of the Andhra Pradesh Legislative Assembly
- Incumbent
- Assumed office 2014
- Preceded by: Daggubati Venkateswara Rao
- Constituency: Parchur

Personal details
- Born: Konanki Village, Martur, Bapatla, Andhra Pradesh
- Party: Telugu Desam Party
- Children: 2
- Education: MS Horticulture; Acharya N. G. Ranga Agricultural University
- Profession: Politician; Social Worker

Yeluri Sambasiva Rao is an Indian politician and businessman from Andhra Pradesh. He serves as the incumbent MLA of the Parchur constituency, representing Telugu Desam Party, [the current ruling party] in the state. He successively led the 2014 & 2019 Assembly election from the same Parchur Constituency. He has won for third time in 2024 from same Parchur Constituency.

== Early life and education ==
Sambasiva Rao was born in Konanki village of Martur Mandal in the former Prakasam district. He completed his early education in Prakasam District before pursuing a Master's degree in MS Horticultural Science at Acharya N.G. Ranga Agricultural University.

== Political career ==
Yeluri Sambasiva Rao, representing TDP, won the 2014 Andhra Pradesh Legislative Assembly Elections with 97,248 votes (51.65%), defeating Gottipati Bharath Kumar. He was re-elected in the 2019 Andhra Pradesh General Elections, securing 97,076 votes (47.78%) against Daggubati Venkateswara Rao, once again representing the Parchur Assembly Constituency in the Prakasam District.

== Family ==
Children: Divyesh Yeluri, Mainank Tarak Yeluri
