= Malyadri Sriram =

Indian politician

Member of Parliament, Lok Sabha
- In office 16 May 2014 – 23 May 2019
- Preceded by: Panabaka Lakshmi
- Succeeded by: Nandigam Suresh
- Constituency: Bapatla

Personal details
- Born: 10 Jul 1954; Parlapalle, Nellore, Andhra Pradesh
- Political party: Telugu Desam Party
- Spouse: Smt. S. Ranganayakamma
- Relations: Shri S. Raghavaiah (father); Smt. S. Anantamma (mother)
- Children: 3

Malyadri Sriram is an Indian politician and a former member of parliament from Bapatla (Lok Sabha constituency), Andhra Pradesh. He won the 2014 Indian general election being a Telugu Desam Party candidate. He has an M.A. in Economics from Sri Venkateshwara University in Tirupathi. He was previously an officer with the Indian Revenue Service. He was elected to the 16th Lok Sabha. In the Lok Sabha he was a member of the Standing Committee on Energy and the Consultative Committee, Ministry of Finance and Corporate Affairs.

== Education ==
Qualification	School/college	Location	Year
M.A. (Eco)	S.V.U.P.G. Center	Kavali, Nellore Dist	1975-77
B.A.	Jawahar Bharathi	Kavali, Nellore Dist	1972-75
12th	Govt. College	Vidavaluru, Nellore Dist.	1970-72
10th	Z.P.H.S.	Kondapuram, Nellore Dist.	1968-69

== Political career ==
Malyadri Sriram resigned from Indian Revenue Service and joined Telugu desam party.

He contested in 2009 loksabha elections from Bapatla parliamentary constituency and lost to Panakabaka Lakshmi, INC.

In 2014 elections, he again contested from same constituency and was elected to loksabha.

== Personal life ==
Malyadri Sriram is married to Smt. S. Ranganayakamma. He has a son and two daughters.
