= Puchalapalli Penchalaiah =

Indian politician (1924–2018)

Member of Parliament, Lok Sabha
- In office 1984–1991
- Preceded by: Doddavarapu Kamakshiah
- Succeeded by: Padmashree Kudumula
- Constituency: Nellore

Personal details
- Born: 15 November 1924 Kodivaka, Nellore, British India (present day Andhra Pradesh, India)
- Died: 29 December 2018 (aged 94) Gudur, Nellore, India
- Party: Telugu Desam Party (TDP)
- Spouse: Puchalapalli Chinna Subbamma
- Children: 2 daughters
- Education: M.A. Political Science
- Alma mater: V. R. College, S. V. University

Puchalapalli Penchalaiah (15 November 1924 – 29 December 2018) was an Indian politician who was a member of the 7th, 8th and 9th Lok Sabhas of India. He represented the Nellore constituency in Andhra Pradesh. He was instrumental in developing schools and shelters for underprivileged people. He introduced the Seenaiah Sena Harijan Wing for the advancement of the lower sections of the society.

== Early life and career ==
Penchalaiah was born on 15 November 1924, at the remote village of Pamanji in Nellore District, to P. Lakshmaiah and Papamma. He studied in a government board high school, which was approximately 10 km from his village. He completed an M.A in Political Science from V. R. College, Nellore.

Before venturing into politics, he was working as a clerk in local fund auditing department, later he resigned and helped his parents in farming. Due to his education, his fellow villagers urged him to enter politics to improve their lives.

== Association with political parties ==
Vice-President, District Congress Committee (I) Nellore, Andhra Pradesh; Vice-President, District Kisan Congress, Nellore, Andhra Pradesh; President, Seenaiah Sena Harijan Wing, Andhra Pradesh Congress (I); Member, Scheduled Castes Federation;

== Electoral history ==
- Seventh Lok Sabha, 1983–84
- Eighth Lok Sabha, 1984–89
- Ninth Lok Sabha, 1989–91

== Committee experience ==
- Member, Committee on Absence of Members from the Sittings of the House, 1984
- Member, Committee on the Welfare of Scheduled Castes and Scheduled Tribes, 1985–86
- Member, Committee on Petitions, Consultative Committees, Works & Housing, Labour and Agriculture
- Member, Consultative Committee, Petroleum & Chemicals, 1990

== Personal life ==
Penchalaiah married Puchalapalli Chinna Subbamma, at the age of 30. They had two children.

He also had an interest in farming and social work. He was President of various organisations in Nellore, including the Deenabandhu Welfare Association, and the Boatmen Welfare Association.

Penchalaiah died in Gudur, Nellore on 29 December 2018, at the age of 94.

== Sources ==
- "Nellore Parliamentary Constituency 2014 Election Results". elections.in.
- "MEMBERS OF NINTH LOK SABHA". indiapress.org.
- "Nellore constituency election results from 1951 to 2009". indiapress.org. Archived from the original on 26 June 2014.
- "Affidavit Details of Penchalaiah Puchalapalli". empoweringindia.org. Archived from the original on 6 June 2014.
