= Nellore Lok Sabha constituency =

Lok Sabha Constituency in Andhra Pradesh

Coordinates: 14.4°N 80.0°E

Nellore
- Lok Sabha constituency
- Interactive Map Outlining Nellore Lok Sabha constituency

Constituency details
- Country: India
- Region: South India
- State: Andhra Pradesh
- Assembly constituencies: Kandukur; Kavali; Atmakur; Kovuru; Nellore City; Nellore Rural; Udayagiri
- Established: 1952
- Total electors: 16,79,359
- Reservation: None

Member of Parliament
- 18th Lok Sabha
- Incumbent Vemireddy Prabhakar Reddy
- Party: TDP
- Alliance: NDA
- Elected year: 2024
- Preceded by: Adala Prabhakara Reddy

Nellore Lok Sabha constituency is one of the twenty-five Lok Sabha constituencies of Andhra Pradesh in India. It comprises seven assembly segments from Nellore district and Prakasam districts.

== Assembly segments ==
Following the delimitation of the parliamentary constituencies in 2008, it comprises the following Andhra Pradesh Legislative Assembly segments

#	Name
109	Kandukur
114	Kavali
115	Atmakur
116	Kovuru
117	Nellore City
118	Nellore Rural
123	Udayagiri

From 1976 to 2008, it comprised the following Andhra Pradesh Legislative Assembly segments

Constituency number	Name	Reserved for (SC/ST/None)
126	Allur	None
129	Rapur	None
130	Nellore	None
131	Sarvepalli	None
132	Gudur	SC

== Members of Parliament ==
^ indicates bye-election

Year	Member	Party
1952	Bezawada Ramachandra Reddy	Independent
1957	B. Anjanappa	Indian National Congress
1962	B. Anjanappa	Indian National Congress
1967	B. Anjanappa	Indian National Congress
1971	Doddavarapu Kamakshiah	Indian National Congress
1977	Doddavarapu Kamakshiah	Indian National Congress
1980	Doddavarapu Kamakshiah	Indian National Congress
1983	Puchalapalli Penchalaiah	Indian National Congress
1984	Puchalapalli Penchalaiah	Indian National Congress
1989	Puchalapalli Penchalaiah	Indian National Congress
1991	Padmashree Kudumula	Indian National Congress
1996	Panabaka Lakshmi	Indian National Congress
1998	Panabaka Lakshmi	Indian National Congress
1999	Vukkala Rajeswaramma	Telugu Desam Party
2004	Panabaka Lakshmi	Indian National Congress
2009	Mekapati Rajamohan Reddy	Indian National Congress
2012^	Mekapati Rajamohan Reddy	YSR Congress Party
2014	Mekapati Rajamohan Reddy	YSR Congress Party
2019	Adala Prabhakara Reddy	YSR Congress Party
2024	Vemireddy Prabhakar Reddy	Telugu Desam Party

== Election results ==
=== General Election 1989 ===
General Election, 1989: Nellore
Party	Candidate	Votes	%	±%
INC	Puchalapalli Penchalaiah	377,602	52.83	+8.52
TDP	M. Nagabhushanamma	305,763	42.78	−11.31
Majority		71,839	10.05	
Turnout		714,775	67.15	+3.34
INC gain from TDP		Swing		

=== General Election 1991 ===
General Election, 1991: Nellore
Party	Candidate	Votes	%	±%
INC	Padmashree Kudumula	268,626	45.68	−7.15
TDP	M. Nagabhushanamma	223,769	38.05	−4.73
BJP	Gaddam Laxmi Narayana	85,306	14.51	
Majority		44,857	7.63	
Turnout		588,098	55.10	−12.05
INC hold		Swing		

=== General Election 1996 ===
General Election, 1996: Nellore
Party	Candidate	Votes	%	±%
INC	Panabaka Lakshmi	269,498	39.62	−6.06
CPI(M)	T P Bhanu Raju	201,313	29.59	
NTRTDP(LP)	Pasam Suneel Kumar	103,947	15.28	
BJP	Gaddam Laxmi Narayana	83,585	12.29	
Majority		68,185	10.03	
Turnout		680,230	57.51	+2.41
INC hold		Swing		

=== General Election 1998 ===
General Election, 1998: Nellore
Party	Candidate	Votes	%	±%
INC	Panabaka Lakshmi	296,731	40.06	+0.44
CPI(M)	Buduru Swarnalatha	250,204	33.78	+4.19
BJP	Karupothala Balakondaiah	175,074	23.63	+11.35
Majority		46,527	6.28	
Turnout		740,792	63.52	+6.01
INC hold		Swing		

=== General Election 1999 ===
General Election, 1999: Nellore
Party	Candidate	Votes	%	±%
TDP	Vukkala Rajeswaramma	381,166	49.51	
INC	Panabaka Lakshmi	340,713	44.26	+4.20
Majority		40,453	5.25	
Turnout		769,832	66.07	+2.55
TDP gain from INC		Swing		

=== General Election 2004 ===
General Election, 2004: Nellore
Party	Candidate	Votes	%	±%
INC	Panabaka Lakshmi	450,129	53.81	
BJP	Balakondaiah Karupotala	321,905	38.48	
Majority		128,224	15.33	
Turnout		836,502	72.54	+6.47
INC gain from TDP		Swing		

=== General Election 2009 ===
General Election, 2009: Nellore
Party	Candidate	Votes	%	±%
INC	Mekapati Rajamohan Reddy	430,235	42.92	
TDP	Vanteru Venu Gopala Reddy	375,242	37.43	
PRP	Jana Ramachandraiah	138,111	13.78	
BJP	Bathina Narasimha Rao	16,727	1.67	
LSP	Vemuri Bhaskara Rao	10,751	1.07	
Majority		54,993	5.49	
Turnout		1,002,419	69.09	−3.45
INC hold		Swing		

==== By-Election 2012 ====
Bye-election, 2012: Nellore
Party	Candidate	Votes	%	±%
YSRCP	Mekapati Rajamohan Reddy	535,436	54.60	
INC	T. Subbarami Reddy	243,691	24.85	
TDP	Vanteru Venugopal Reddy	154,103	15.71	
CPI(M)	Chandra Rajagopal	17,952	1.83	
IND.	Meda Malla Reddy	6,876	0.70	
Majority		291,745	29.75	
Turnout		980,970	72.56	
YSRCP gain from INC		Swing		

=== General Election 2014 ===
2014 Indian general elections: Nellore
Party	Candidate	Votes	%	±%
YSRCP	Mekapati Rajamohan Reddy	576,396	48.53	
TDP	Adala Prabhakara Reddy	562,918	47.40	
INC	Narayana Reddy Vakati	22,870	1.93	
JSP	Syed Haneef	5,578	0.47	
NOTA	None of the above	5,549	0.47	
Majority		13,478	1.13	
Turnout		11,88,855	74.02	+6.28
YSRCP hold		Swing		

=== General Election 2019 ===
2019 Indian general elections: Nellore
Party	Candidate	Votes	%	±%
YSRCP	Adala Prabhakara Reddy	683,830	53.04	
TDP	Beeda Masthan Rao	535,259	41.52	
CPI(M)	Chandra Rajagopal	18,830	1.46	
NOTA	None of the above	17,161	1.33	
BJP	Sannapureddy Suresh Reddy	12,513	0.97	
Majority		148,571	11.54	
Turnout		12,87,036	76.94	
Registered electors		16,72,845		
YSRCP hold		Swing		

=== General Election 2024 ===
2024 Indian general elections: Nellore
Party	Candidate	Votes	%	±%
TDP	Vemireddy Prabhakar Reddy	766,202	55.70	
YSRCP	V. Vijayasai Reddy	5,20,300	37.82	
INC	Koppula Raju	54,844	3.99	
NOTA	None of the above	15,577	1.13	
Majority		2,45,902	17.88	
Turnout		13,78,697	80.49	
TDP gain from YSRCP		Swing		

== See also ==
- List of constituencies of the Andhra Pradesh Legislative Assembly
