= Vegesana Narendra Varma Raju =

Indian politician

Member of the Andhra Pradesh Legislative Assembly
- Incumbent
- Assumed office 2024
- Preceded by: Kona Raghupathi
- Constituency: Bapatla

Personal details
- Born: 1968 (age 57–58)
- Party: Telugu Desam Party

Vegesana Narendra Varma Raju (born 1969) is an Indian politician from Andhra Pradesh. He is an MLA from Bapatla Assembly constituency in Bapatla district. He represents Telugu Desam Party. He won the 2024 Andhra Pradesh Legislative Assembly election where TDP had an alliance with BJP and JSP.

== Early life and education ==
Raju is from Bapatla. His father’s name is Vegesana Krishnam Raju. He is a businessman and his wife also looks after the business. He completed his secondary school certificate examination at Government Junior College, Pittalavanipalem, Guntur District in 1985.

== Political career ==
Raju won the 2024 Andhra Pradesh Legislative Assembly election from Bapatla Assembly constituency representing Telugu Desam Party. He polled 90,626 votes and defeated Kona Raghupathi of YSR Congress Party by a margin of 27,768 votes.

== Electoral performance ==
2024 Andhra Pradesh Legislative Assembly election: Bapatla
Party	Candidate	Votes	%	±%
TDP	Vegesana Narendra Varma	90,626	56.21%	
YSRCP	Kona Raghupathi	62,858	38.98%	
INC	Ganta Anjibabu	4,193	2.60%	
NOTA	None Of The Above	1,128	0.70%	
Majority		27,768	17.22%	
Turnout		1,61,226		
TDP gain from YSRCP		Swing		
