= Bapatla Assembly constituency =

Constituency of the Andhra Pradesh Legislative Assembly, India

Coordinates: 15.90°N 80.47°E

Bapatla
- Constituency No. 92 for the Andhra Pradesh Legislative Assembly
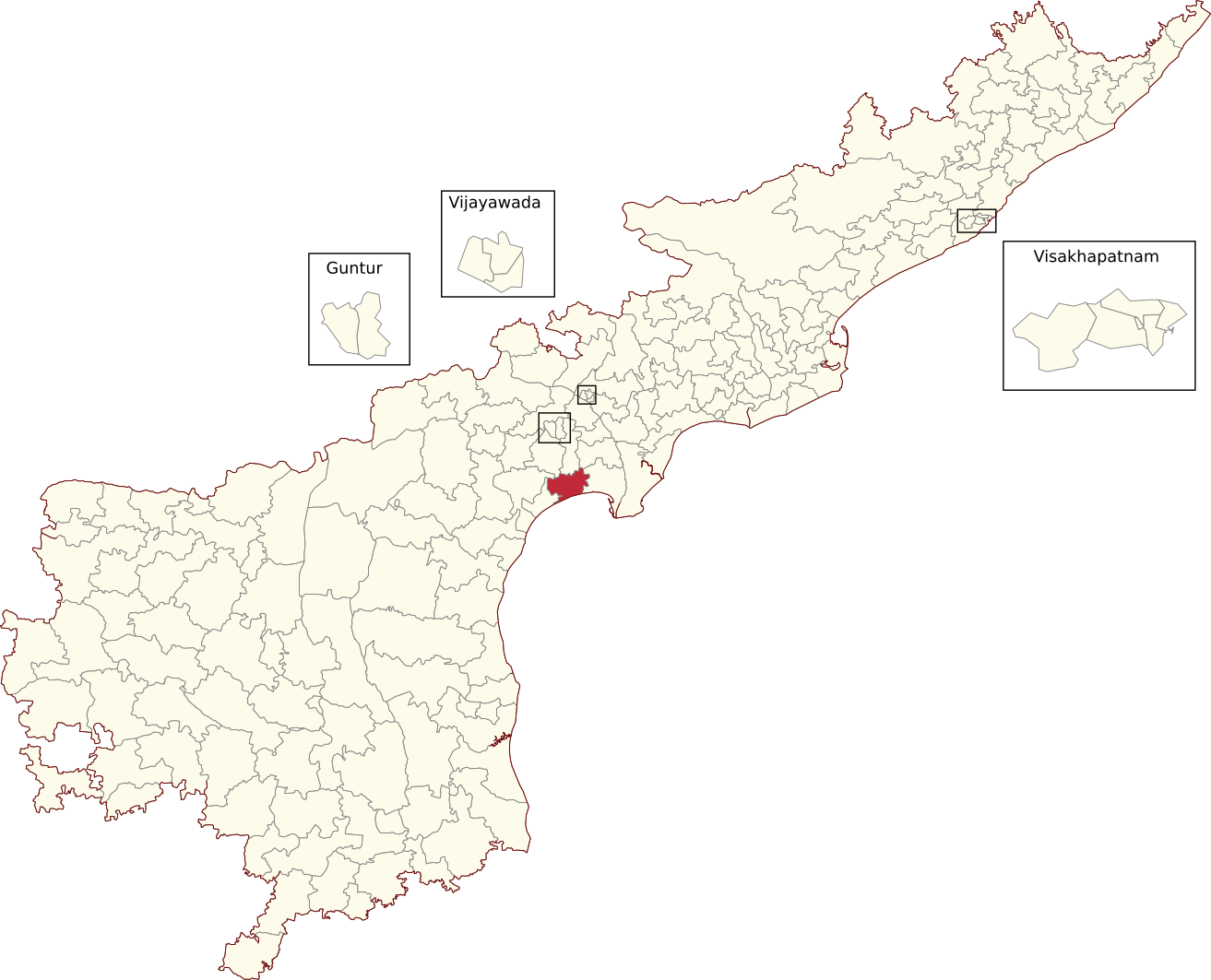
- Location of Bapatla Assembly constituency within Andhra Pradesh

Constituency details
- Country: India
- Region: South India
- State: Andhra Pradesh
- District: Guntur
- Lok Sabha constituency: Bapatla
- Established: 1951
- Total electors: 183,917
- Reservation: None

Member of Legislative Assembly
- 16th Andhra Pradesh Legislative Assembly
- Incumbent Vegesana Narendra Varma Raju
- Party: TDP
- Elected year: 2024

Bapatla Assembly constituency is a constituency in Guntur district of Andhra Pradesh that elects representatives to the Andhra Pradesh Legislative Assembly in India. It is one of the seven assembly segments of Bapatla Lok Sabha constituency.

Vegesana Narendra Varma Raju is the current MLA of the constituency, having won the 2019 Andhra Pradesh Legislative Assembly election from YSR Congress Party. As of 25 March 2019, there are a total of 183,917 electors in the constituency. The constituency was established in 1951, as per Delimination Orders (1951).

== Mandals ==
Mandal
Bapatla
Pittalavanipalem
Karlapalem

Mandals in Bapatla Assembly Constituency

== Members of the Legislative Assembly ==
Year	Member	Political party
1952	Vasireddi Srikrishna	Communist Party of India
1955	Mantena Venkataraju	Indian National Congress
1962	Kommineni Venkateswararao	Independent
1967	Kona Prabhakara Rao	Indian National Congress
1972	Kona Prabhakara Rao	Indian National Congress
1978	Kona Prabhakara Rao	Indian National Congress (I)
1983	C. V. Ramaraju	Telugu Desam Party
1985	Ummareddy Venkateswarlu	Telugu Desam Party
1989	Chirala Govardhana Reddy	Indian National Congress
1994	Muppalaneni Seshagiri Rao	Telugu Desam Party
1999	Manthena Anantha Varma	Telugu Desam Party
2004	Gade Venkata Reddy	Indian National Congress
2009	Gade Venkata Reddy	Indian National Congress
2014	Kona Raghupathi	YSR Congress Party
2019	Kona Raghupathi	YSR Congress Party
2024	Vegesana Narendra Varma Raju	Telugu Desam Party

== Election results ==
=== 1952 ===
1952 Madras Legislative Assembly election: Bapatla
Party	Candidate	Votes	%	±%
CPI	Vemmulapalli Srikrishna	22,806	35.73%	
INC	Nankena Venkataraju	20,399	31.96%	31.96%
KLP	Goavada Prandhamayya	16,273	25.49%	
AIFB	Velagan Lakshmi Sundara Rao	1,171	1.83%	
Independent	Vamavarapu Venkateswarlu	1,124	1.76%	
Independent	Bendapudi Narayana Rao	1,076	1.69%	
Independent	C. L. Daniel	986	1.54%	
Margin of victory		2,407	3.77%	
Turnout		63,835	74.93%	
Registered electors		85,198		
CPI win (new seat)				

=== 1955 ===
1955 Andhra Pradesh Legislative Assembly election: Bapatla
Party	Candidate	Votes	%	±%
INC	Manthen Venkata Raju	26,581	56.41%	
CPI	Vemupalli Srikrishna	18,626	39.53%	
Margin of victory		7,995	16.88%	
Turnout		47,120	70.67%	
Registered electors		66,676		
INC gain from CPI		Swing		

=== 1962 ===
1962 Andhra Pradesh Legislative Assembly election: Bapatla
Party	Candidate	Votes	%	±%
Independent	Kommineni Venkateswara Rao	14,317	29.71%	
INC	Mantena Satyavathi	13,104	27.19%	
Margin of victory		1213	2.52%	
Turnout		50,069	67.26%	
Registered electors		74,436		
Independent (I) gain from INC		Swing		

=== 1967 ===
1967 Andhra Pradesh Legislative Assembly election: Bapatla
Party	Candidate	Votes	%	±%
INC	Kona Prabhakar Rao	32,344	56.59%	
CPI(M)	Kommineni Venkateswara Rao	17,117	29.95%	
Margin of victory		15,227	26.64%	
Turnout		59,464	74.85%	
Registered electors		79,444		
INC gain from Independent		Swing		

=== 1972 ===
1972 Andhra Pradesh Legislative Assembly election: Bapatla
Party	Candidate	Votes	%	±%
INC	Kona Prabhakar Rao	33,314	49.82%	
Independent	Muppalaneni Seshagiri Rao	31,025	46.40%	
Margin of victory		2289	3.42%	
Turnout		68,003	73.50%	
Registered electors		92,516		
INC hold		Swing		

=== 1978 ===
1978 Andhra Pradesh Legislative Assembly election: Bapatla
Party	Candidate	Votes	%	±%
INC(I)	Kona Prabhakar Rao	40,332	46.95%	
JP	Muppalaneni Seshagiri Rao	40,143	46.73%	
Margin of victory		189	0.22%	
Turnout		87,507	78.64%	
Registered electors		111,272		
INC(I) gain from INC		Swing		

=== 1983 ===
1983 Andhra Pradesh Legislative Assembly election: Bapatla
Party	Candidate	Votes	%	±%
TDP	C V Ramaraju	57,263	66.73%	
INC	Kona Prabhakar Rao	27,831	32.43%	
Margin of victory		29,432	34.30%	
Turnout		87,673	72.83%	
Registered electors		120,375		
TDP gain from INC(I)		Swing		

=== 1985 ===
1985 Andhra Pradesh Legislative Assembly election: Bapatla
Party	Candidate	Votes	%	±%
TDP	Ummareddy Venkateswarlu	37,129	42.92%	
INC	Manthena Venkata Suryanarayana Raju	19,102	22.08%	
Margin of victory		18,027	20.84%	
Turnout		89,469	70.03%	
Registered electors		127,752		
TDP hold		Swing		

=== 1989 ===
1989 Andhra Pradesh Legislative Assembly election: Bapatla
Party	Candidate	Votes	%	±%
INC	Chirala Govardan Reddy	58,505	57.01%	
TDP	Achyutha Ramaraju Penumatsa	42,922	41.83%	
Margin of victory		15,583	15.19%	
Turnout		106,074	71.81%	
Registered electors		147,707		
INC gain from TDP		Swing		

=== 1994 ===
1994 Andhra Pradesh Legislative Assembly election: Bapatla
Party	Candidate	Votes	%	±%
TDP	Seshagiiri Rao Muppalaneni	63,001	59.67%	
BSP	Kathi Padma Rao	21,507	20.37%	
INC	Chukka Peter Paul	19,067	18.06%	
Margin of victory		41,494	39.30%	
Turnout		107,329	69.41%	
Registered electors		154,625		
TDP gain from INC		Swing		

=== 1999 ===
1999 Andhra Pradesh Legislative Assembly election: Bapatla
Party	Candidate	Votes	%	±%
TDP	Anantha Varma Manthena	50,008	46.61%	
INC	Seshagiiri Rao Muppalaneni	36,163	33.71%	
Margin of victory		13,845	12.91%	
Turnout		110,016	67.83%	
Registered electors		162,199		
TDP hold		Swing		

=== 2004 ===
2004 Andhra Pradesh Legislative Assembly election: Bapatla
Party	Candidate	Votes	%	±%
INC	Gade Venkata Reddy	61,370	55.60%	
TDP	Anantha Varma Manthena	45,801	41.49%	
Margin of victory		15,569	1.11%	
Turnout		110,439	72.51%	
Registered electors		152,312		
INC gain from TDP		Swing		

=== 2009 ===
2009 Andhra Pradesh Legislative Assembly election: Bapatla
Party	Candidate	Votes	%	±%
INC	Gade Venkata Reddy	37,456	30.51%	
TDP	Chirala Govardhan Reddy	36,093	29.40%	
Independent	Kona Raghupathi	29,041	23.65%	
PRP	Uggirala Seetaramulu @ Seetaramaiah	15,911	12.92%	
LSP	Cherukuri Subba Rao	2,219	1.80%	
Margin of victory		1,363	1.11%	
Turnout		123,135	76.02%	
Registered electors		161,981		
INC hold		Swing		

=== 2014 ===
2014 Andhra Pradesh Legislative Assembly election: Bapatla
Party	Candidate	Votes	%	±%
YSRCP	Kona Raghupathi	71,076	50.29	
TDP	Annam Satish Prabhakar	65,263	46.17	
Majority		5813	4.11	
Turnout		148,808	82.82	
YSRCP gain from INC		Swing		

=== 2019 ===
2019 Andhra Pradesh Legislative Assembly election: Bapatla
Party	Candidate	Votes	%	±%
YSRCP	Kona Raghupathi	79,836	51.92	
TDP	Annam Satish Prabhakar	64,637	42.04	
JSP	Lakshmi Narasimha Ikkurthi	4,006	2.6	
Majority		15,199	9.88	
Turnout		1,53,769	83.08	
YSRCP hold		Swing		

=== 2024 ===
2024 Andhra Pradesh Legislative Assembly election: Bapatla
Party	Candidate	Votes	%	±%
TDP	Vegesana Narendra Varma	90,626	56.21%	
YSRCP	Kona Raghupathi	62,858	38.98%	
INC	Ganta Anjibabu	4,193	2.60%	
NOTA	None Of The Above	1,128	0.70%	
Majority		27,768	17.22%	
Turnout		1,61,226		
TDP gain from YSRCP		Swing		

== See also ==
- List of constituencies of Andhra Pradesh Legislative Assembly
