= Satyavedu Assembly constituency =

Constituency of the Andhra Pradesh Legislative Assembly, India

Coordinates: 16.07°N 78.87°E

Satyavedu
- Constituency No. 169 for the Andhra Pradesh Legislative Assembly
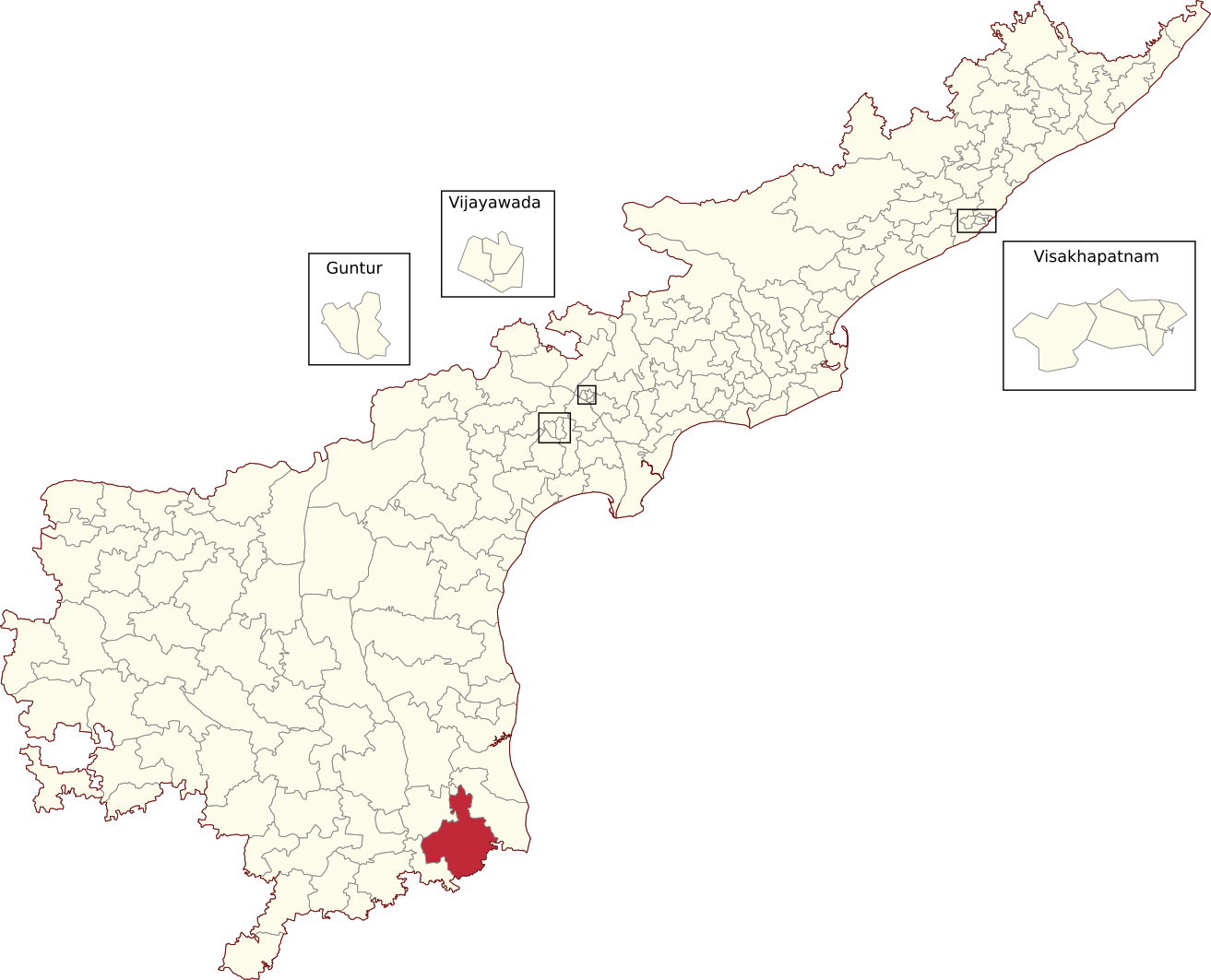
- Location of Satyavedu Assembly constituency within Andhra Pradesh

Constituency details
- Country: India
- Region: South India
- State: Andhra Pradesh
- District: Tirupati
- Lok Sabha constituency: Tirupati
- Established: 1962
- Total electors: 202,771
- Reservation: SC

Member of Legislative Assembly
- 16th Andhra Pradesh Legislative Assembly
- Incumbent Koneti Adimulam
- Party: TDP
- Alliance: NDA
- Elected year: 2024

Satyavedu Assembly constituency is a constituency in Tirupati district of Andhra Pradesh that elects representatives to the Andhra Pradesh Legislative Assembly in India. It is one of the seven assembly segments of Tirupati Lok Sabha constituency. It is reserved for Scheduled Caste community members.

Koneti Adimulam is the current MLA of the constituency, having won the 2024 Andhra Pradesh Legislative Assembly election from Telugu Desam Party. As of 2019, there are a total of 202,771 electors in the constituency. The constituency was established in 1962, as per the Delimitation Orders (1962).

== Mandals ==
Mandal
Buchinaidu Kandriga
K.V.B.Puram
Nagalapuram
Narayanavanam
Pichatur
Satyavedu
Varadaiahpalem

== Members of the Legislative Assembly ==
Year	Member	Political party
1962	Tambura Balakrushniah	Indian National Congress
1967	K. Munaswamy	Swatantra Party
1972	C. Doss	Indian National Congress
1978	C. Doss	Indian National Congress
1983	Manohar Talari	Telugu Desam Party
1985	Emsurajan	Telugu Desam Party
1989	C. Doss	Indian National Congress
1994	Emsurajan	Telugu Desam Party
1999	Naramalli Sivaprasad	Telugu Desam Party
2004	K. Narayana Swamy	Indian National Congress
2009	H. Hemalatha	Telugu Desam Party
2014	Talari Aditya Tarachandrakanth	Telugu Desam Party
2019	Koneti Adimulam	YSR Congress Party
2024	Koneti Adimulam	Telugu Desam Party

== Election results ==
=== 2004 ===
2004 Andhra Pradesh Legislative Assembly election: Satyavedu
Party	Candidate	Votes	%	±%
INC	K. Narayana Swamy	68,323	62.94	+16.82
TDP	Naramalli Sivaprasad	36,831	33.93	−18.58
Majority		31,492	29.01	
Turnout		108,557	72.94	+5.43
INC gain from TDP		Swing		

=== 2009 ===
2009 Andhra Pradesh Legislative Assembly election: Satyavedu
Party	Candidate	Votes	%	±%
TDP	H Hemalatha	65,471	46.05	+12.12
INC	K. Narayana Swamy	55,780	39.23	−23.71
PRP	Sankala Subbaiah	13,823	9.72	
Majority		9,691	6.82	
Turnout		142,184	79.94	+7.00
TDP gain from INC		Swing		

=== 2014 ===
2014 Andhra Pradesh Legislative Assembly election: Satyavedu
Party	Candidate	Votes	%	±%
TDP	Talari Aditya	77,655	48.22	
YSRCP	Koneti Adimulam	73,428	45.60	
Majority		4,227	2.62	
Turnout		161,036	83.15	+3.21
TDP hold		Swing		

=== 2019 ===
2019 Andhra Pradesh Legislative Assembly election: Sathyavedu
Party	Candidate	Votes	%	±%
YSRCP	Koneti Adimulam	103,941	59.02	
TDP	Jadda Rajasekhar	59,197	33.61	
BJP	S. Venkataiah	1610	0.91	
Majority		44,744	25.41	
Turnout		176,114		
YSRCP gain from TDP		Swing		

=== 2024 ===
2024 Andhra Pradesh Legislative Assembly election: Sathyavedu
Party	Candidate	Votes	%	±%
TDP	Koneti Adimulam	85,471	46.32	
YSRCP	Nukathoti Rajesh	81,732	44.29	
INC	Balaguruvam Babu	5,444	2.95	
Independent	Yathati Ramesh Babu	3,486	1.89	
NOTA	None Of The Above	2,764	1.50	
Majority		3,739	2.03	
Turnout		184,522		
TDP hold		Swing		

== See also ==
- List of constituencies of Andhra Pradesh Vidhan Sabha
