= Srikalahasti mandal =

- Mandal
- Interactive map of Srikalahasti mandal
- Location in Andhra Pradesh, India
- Coordinates: 13.76°N 79.70°E
- Country: India
- State: Andhra Pradesh
- District: Tirupati
- Headquarters: Srikalahasti

Government
  - Body: Mandal Parishad

Area
  - Total: 420.59 km^{2} (162.39 sq mi)

Population (2011)
  - Total: 57,581
  - Density: 136.91/km^{2} (354.58/sq mi)

Languages
  - Official: Telugu
- Time zone: UTC+5:30 (IST)

Srikalahasti mandal is one of the 36 mandals in Tirupati district of the Indian state of Andhra Pradesh. It is under the administration of Srikalahasti revenue division and the headquarters are located at Srikalahasti. The mandal is bounded by Renigunta, Yerpedu, Narayanavanam and Thottambedu.

== History ==
This mandal was a part of Chittoor district and was reorganised to be a part of newly formed Tirupati district on 4 April 2022.

== Government and politics ==
Srikalahasti mandal is one of the 4 mandals under Srikalahasti (Assembly constituency), which in turn represents Tirupati (Lok Sabha constituency) of Andhra Pradesh.

== Towns and villages ==
As of 2011 census, the mandal has 1 town and 66 villages.

The settlements in the mandal are listed below:

1. Akkurthy
2. Ammacheruvu
3. Ammapalem
4. Ananthapadmanabhapuram
5. Appalayagunta
6. Aravakothuru
7. Bahadur Venkatapuram
8. Bheemavaram
9. Bodavaripalle
10. Bokkasampalem
11. Brahmanapalle
12. Challapalem
13. Cherlapalle
14. Cherlopalle Vyavasayapu Khandriga
15. Cherukulapadu
16. Chukkalanidigallu
17. Diguvaveedhi
18. Eguvaveedhi
19. Empedu
20. Erragudipadu
21. Gollapalle @ Venkatapuram
22. Govindaraopalle
23. Guntakindapalle
24. Inagalur
25. Kalavagunta
26. Kammakothur
27. Kapugunneri
28. Konerugunta
29. Kothapalle Chinthala
30. Kothuru @ Chellamambapuram
31. Kuntipudi
32. Madamala
33. Maddiledu
34. Mangalagunta
35. Mangalapuri
36. Mannavaram
37. Marrimakulachenu Khandriga
38. Melachur
39. Muchivolu
40. Muddumudi
41. Murthy Palem
42. Narayanapuram
43. Obulayapalle
44. Panagallu (Rural)
45. Papanapalle
46. Pathagunta
47. Penubaka
48. Poli
49. Pullareddi Khandriga
50. Rachagunneri
51. Ramalingapuram
52. Ramanuja Palle
53. Ramapuram
54. Reddipalle
55. Sahasralingeswarapuram
56. Srikalahasti (M)
57. Subbanaidu-Khandriga
58. Thondamanadu
59. Udamalapadu
60. Uranduru
61. Vagavedu
62. Vampalle
63. Vedam
64. Velampadu
65. Velavedu
66. Vengalam Palle @ Endrapalle
67. Yarlapudi
68. Thimmavaram

Note: M-Municipality

== See also ==
- List of mandals in Andhra Pradesh
