= Ubbalamadugu Falls =

Waterfall in Andhra Pradesh, India

Coordinates: 13°36′35″N 79°50′34″E

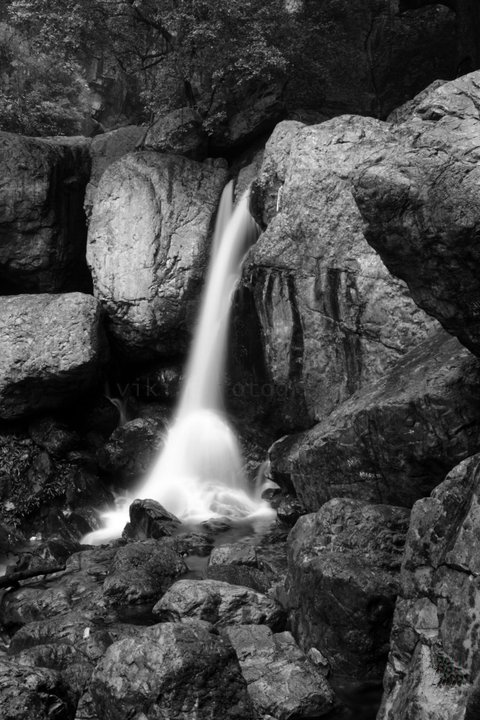
Tada Falls

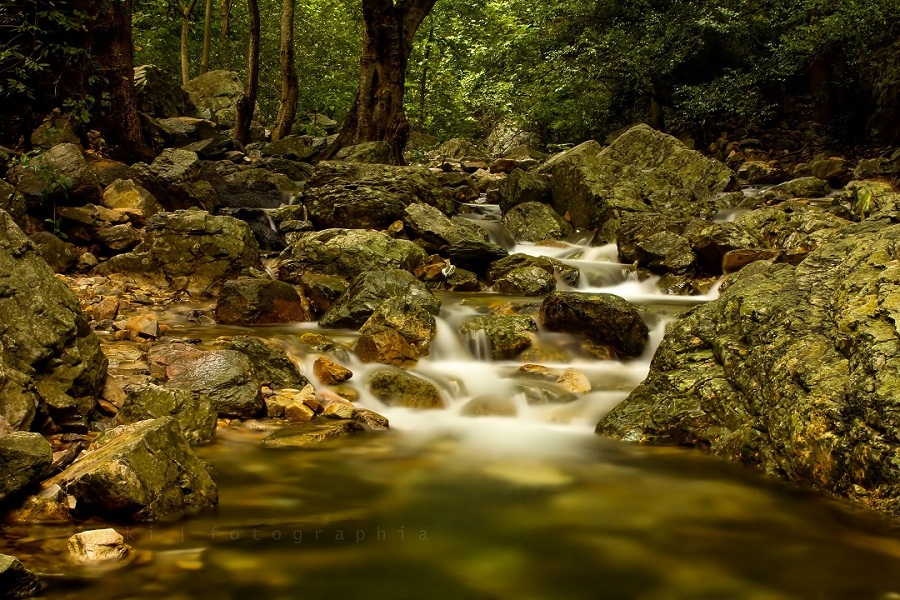
Water flowing downhill

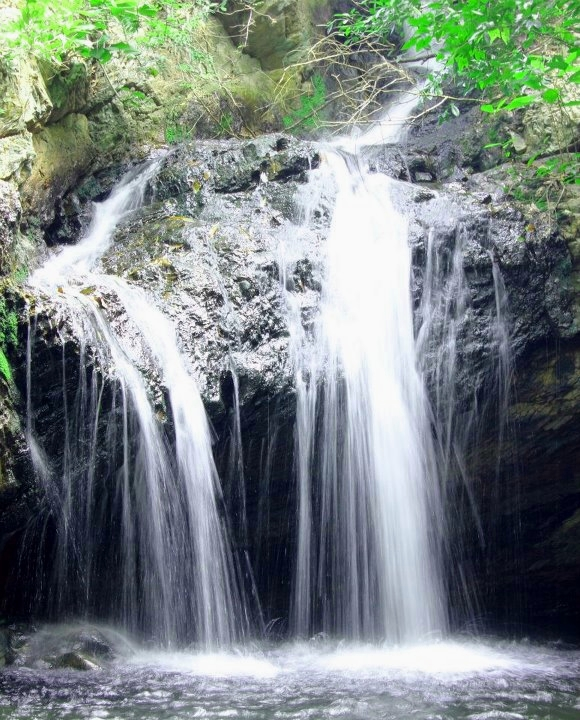
Cascade section of Tada Waterfalls — in the Eastern Ghats, southeast India.

Ubbalamudugu Falls (also called Tada Falls) is a waterfall located near Oneness Temple and Sricity in the Tirupati district of India. It is a clear waterfall falling from a height of 100 meters. Coming under the Buchinaidu kandriga and Varadaiahpalem mandals the falls are located 80 kilometres (50 mi) from Chennai and 35 kilometres (22 mi) from Srikalahasti.

The falls are located in a dense forest called the Siddulaiah Kona. The relation to Shiva ensures that the festival of Maha Shivaratri is a common time for people to visit.

== Trekking ==
The total trek is almost of 10 km through rough patches and rocky terrains. Novice hikers can trek along a 3 km long trail one way that snakes along a clear stream of water. Mid-level trekkers can go further up, climbing the boulders to reach the base of the falls.

== See also ==
- List of waterfalls
- List of waterfalls in India
