= Penchal Das =

Indian songwriter

- Born: Putta Penchal Das chitvel, Andhra Pradesh, India
- Occupations: Singer; poet; songwriter
- Years active: 2018–present
- Musical career
- Genres: Folk; filmi; world music
- Instrument: Vocals
- Labels: Sony Music India; T-Series; Junglee Music

Putta Penchal Das is an Indian singer, songwriter, and poet who works in Telugu cinema. His popular songs include "Dhaari Choodu" from Krishnarjuna Yudham (2018) and "Bhalegundi Baalaa" from Sreekaram (2021), and received a SIIMA Awards nomination for the latter.

== Early life and career ==
Putta Penchal Das was born in Devamachupalli in Chitvel mandal of Kadapa district (now in Annamayya district), Andhra Pradesh, India. He picked up singing from his father and uncle who are also singers. Speaking to The Hindu about his writing, he said that, "I am also a writer in my mandalikam. I write poetry too. I am collecting and researching folk songs seriously. Anyone can write but you should have content and material to write about something like folklore. Whatever word you say, a story can be formed from Janapadam".

He is a Batik paintings artist, for which he was awarded from the Government of Andhra Pradesh. He is also working as a drawing and arts teacher at a government school in the district.

Das sings at writers events in the Sri Venkateswara University. He was first noticed by filmmaker Merlapaka Gandhi's father Murali, at the event. He was then hired to work in Merlapaka Gandhi's directorial Express Raja (2016), but couldn't sing due to personal health condition. He has debuted with "Dhaari Choodu" from Krishnarjuna Yudham (2018), which later became his breakthrough.

== Discography ==
Year	Song(s)	Work	Credited as		Composer	Ref.
Year	Song(s)	Work	Singer	Lyricist	Composer	Ref.
2018	"Dhaari Choodu"	Krishnarjuna Yudham	Yes	Yes	Hiphop Tamizha	
2018	"Headache Ra Mama Headache"	Silly Fellows	Yes	No	Sri Vasanth	
2018	"Yeda Poyinado"	Aravinda Sametha Veera Raghava	Yes	Yes	Thaman S	
2018	"Reddamma Thalli"	Aravinda Sametha Veera Raghava	No	Yes	Thaman S	
2019	"Glassmates"	Chitralahari	Yes	No	Devi Sri Prasad	
2019	"Maruginava Rajanna"	Yatra	Yes	Yes	K	
2021	"Bhalegundi Baalaa"	Sreekaram	Yes	No	Mickey J. Meyer	
2021	"Yenduko Ee Mohamu "	Brandy Diaries	No	Yes	Prakash	
2021	"Ye Konda Chaatuna"	Maa Oori Polimera	Yes	No	Gyaani	
2022	"Maa Kalala"	Visakhapattana Kendram	Yes	Yes	Karthik Kodakandla	
2022	"Emanti Nabayaa"	Like, Share & Subscribe	Yes	No	Praveen Lakkaraju	
2024	"Naa Nalla Kaluvapuvvaa"	Theppa Samudram	Yes	Yes	Peddapalli Rohith	
2024	"Amma Laalo Ram Bhajana"	Aay	Yes	No	Ajay Arasada	
2024	"Batuku Kore"	Pottel	Yes	Yes	Shekar Chandra	
2025	"Tikku Tikku"	Racharikam	Yes	Yes	Vengi	
2025	"Nippuvi Ningi Egi"	Racharikam	No	Yes	Vengi	
2025	"Oho Rathamma"	Laila	Yes	Yes	Leon James	
2025	"Maata Vinaali"	Hari Hara Veera Mallu: Part 1	No	Yes	M. M. Keeravani	

== Filmography ==
=== Television ===
Year	Title	Role	Network
2024	Sa Re Ga Ma Pa The Next Singing Youth Icon	Mentor	Zee Telugu

== Awards and nominations ==
Award	Year	Category	Work	Result	Ref.
South Indian International Movie Awards	2022	Best Male Playback Singer – Telugu	"Bhalegundi Baalaa" (from Sreekaram)	Nominated	
