= Madibaka =

Indian village in Andhra Pradesh

- village
- Interactive map of Madibaka
- Location in Andhra Pradesh, India
- Coordinates: 13°38′31″N 79°35′53″E
- Country: India
- State: Andhra Pradesh
- District: Tirupati
- Mandal: Yerpedu

Population
  - Total: 500+

Languages
  - Official: Telugu
- Time zone: UTC+5:30 (IST)
- PIN: 517526.
- Vehicle registration: AP
- Nearest city: Tirupathi
- Vidhan Sabha constituency: srikalhasti
- Climate: bit humid (Köppen)

Madibaka (Telugu:మడిబాక) is a village in Yerpedu mandal, Tirupati district, Andhra Pradesh. It is 26 km from the temple town of Tirupati and 19 km from Sri Kalahasti.

== Economy ==
The main occupation is agriculture.
