= Kumara Venkata Bhupala Puram =

Kumara Venkata Bhupala Puram K. V. B. Puram
- Village
- Interactive map of Kumara Venkata Bhupala Puram
- Location in Andhra Pradesh, India
- Coordinates: 13°34′36″N 79°41′41″E
- Country: India
- State: Andhra Pradesh
- District: Tirupati
- Mandal: K. V. B. Puram

Languages
  - Official: Telugu
- Time zone: UTC+5:30 (IST)

Kumara Venkata Bhupala Puram or K. V. B. Puram is a village in Tirupati district of the Indian state of Andhra Pradesh. It is the mandal headquarters of K. V. B. Puram mandal and is located in Srikalahasti revenue division.
