= Mavillapadu =

- Village
- Interactive map of Mavillapadu
- Location in Andhra Pradesh, India
- Coordinates: 13°45′49″N 79°57′40″E
- Country: India
- State: Andhra Pradesh
- District: Tirupati

Languages
  - Official: Telugu
- Time zone: UTC+5:30 (IST)

Mavillapadu is a village in Varadaiahpalem mandal in Tirupati district in the state of Andhra Pradesh in India.
