= Chennam Palli =

- Village
- Location in Andhra Pradesh, India
- Coordinates: 13.600755°N 79.5410717°E
- Country: India
- State: Andhra Pradesh
- District: Tirupati district
- Mandal: Yerpedu

Population (2016)
  - Total: 500
- Time zone: UTC+5:30 (IST)
- PIN: 517526
- Telephone code: +91–8578
- Vehicle registration: AP 03

ChennamPalli (also spelled Chennam Palle or Chennampalli) is a village in Yerpedu mandal of Tirupati district in the Indian state of Andhra Pradesh. The village is located near Renigunta and Tirupati in the Rayalaseema region.

== Geography ==
Chennam Palli is situated near Papanaidupet in Yerpedu mandal. The village lies within the Swarnamukhi River basin region.

== Demographics ==
Telugu is the official and predominantly spoken language in the village. Tamil is also spoken by a minority of residents.

== Transport ==
The nearest railway stations are Renigunta Junction railway station and Yerpedu railway station. Tirupati Airport near Renigunta is the nearest airport to the village.

== Culture ==
The village is associated with the worship of the local deity Chennamma Thalli. According to local tradition, the village derives its name from the deity. Annual religious ceremonies and festivals dedicated to Chennamma Thalli are conducted by the villagers.

== See also ==
- Yerpedu mandal
- Tirupati district
- Renigunta
- Swarnamukhi River
- Gajulamandyam Industrial Area
