= Chemuru =

- Village
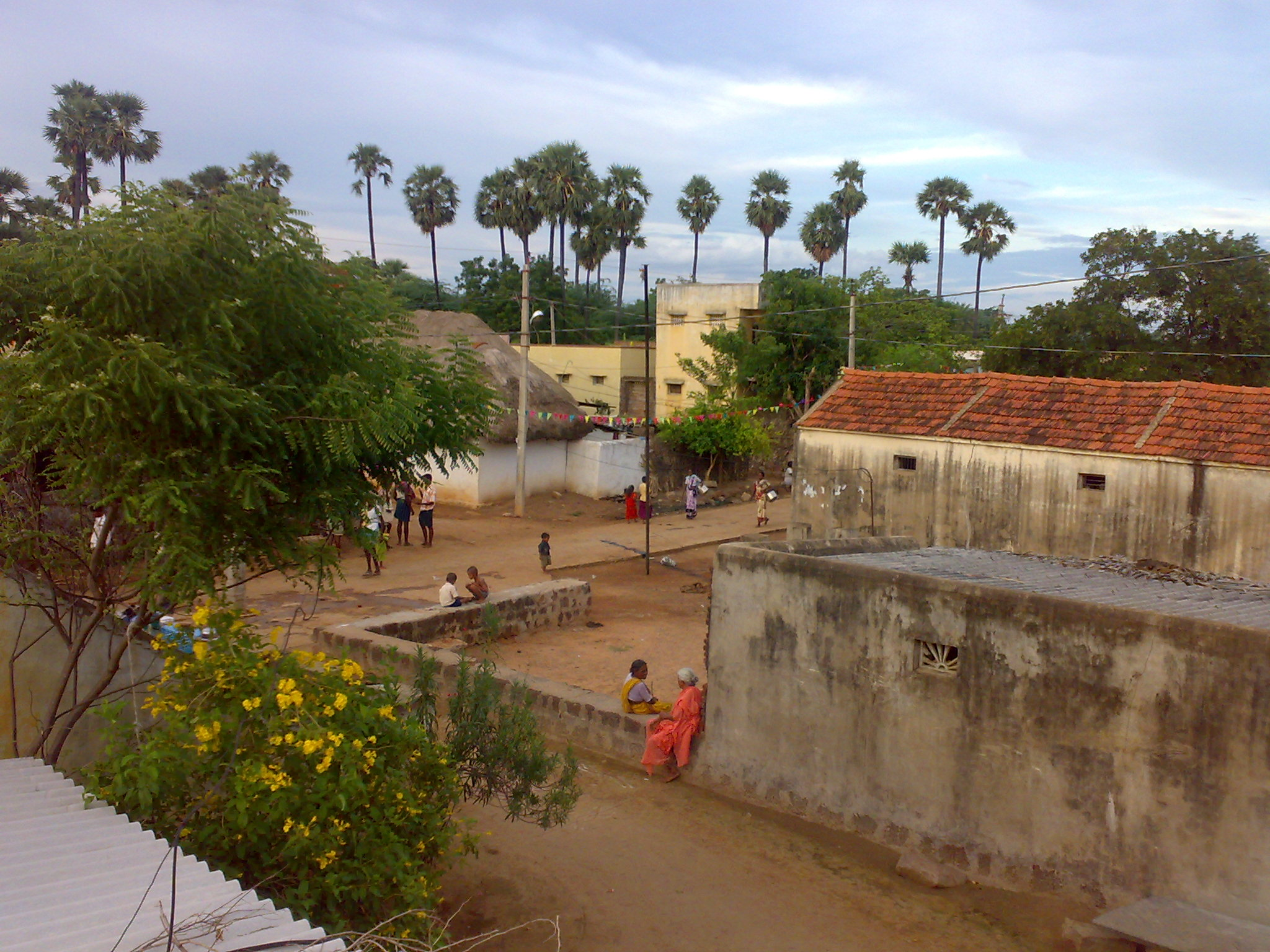
- Chemuru
- Interactive map of Chemuru
- Location in Andhra Pradesh, India Chemuru (India)
- Coordinates: 13°50′N 79°41′E
- Country: India
- State: Andhra Pradesh
- District: Tirupati

Languages
  - Official: Telugu
- Time zone: UTC+5:30 (IST)
- PIN: 517536

Chemuru is a village in Thottambedu mandal, located in Tirupati district of Indian state of Andhra Pradesh. This belongs to Chiyyavaram Gram panchayat, Srikalahasti assembly constituency and Tirupati parliamentary constituency

== Population ==
According to 2011 India census report, the population statistics are as follows.

House holds	183
Total population	797
Male	405
Female	392

== Revenue ==
Agriculture is the main source of income. The farmers mostly grow Paddy, Ground nut. Swarnamukhi river passing near by provides water for agriculture. People also get revenue by growing cattle and sheep.

=== Education ===
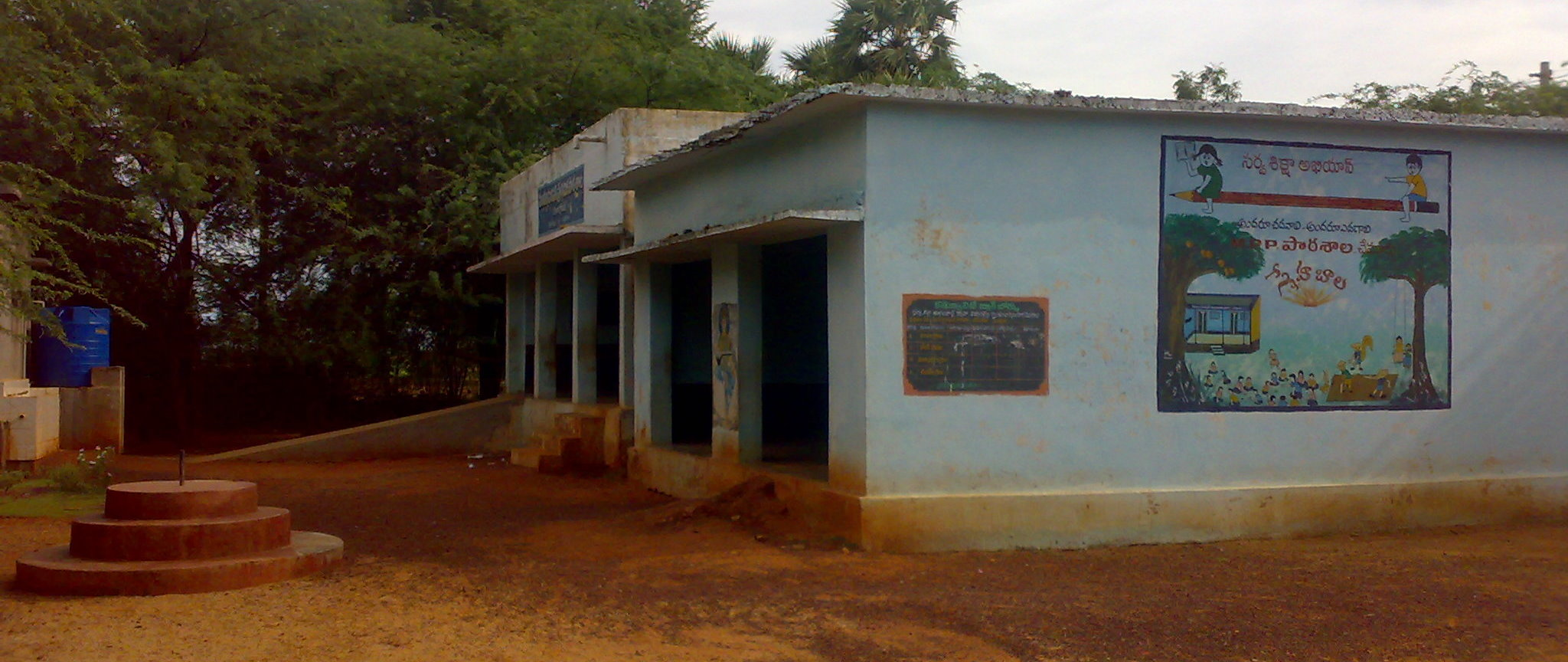
Primary school

Government run Anganwadi school caters to the needs of playgroup and kindergarten children. There is a Mandal Parishat Primary school in the village which offers primary education from 1st standard to 5th standard. For High school education, students travel to nearby town Srikalahasti.

=== Travel ===
There are APSRTC buses from Srikalahasti to Kasaram, Chiyyavaram, Pillamedu which passes via this village. These buses does not go into the village, but they drop passengers at the Bus stop on the main road. From the main road, the village is connected by a 1-km long narrow road. There are private Autos which operate to and from Srikalahasti into the village. The nearest railway stations are Ellakaru, and Srikalahasti. The nearest domestic Airport is in Tirupati at a distance of 40 km. The nearest international airport is in Chennai at a distance of 100 km.

== Religion ==
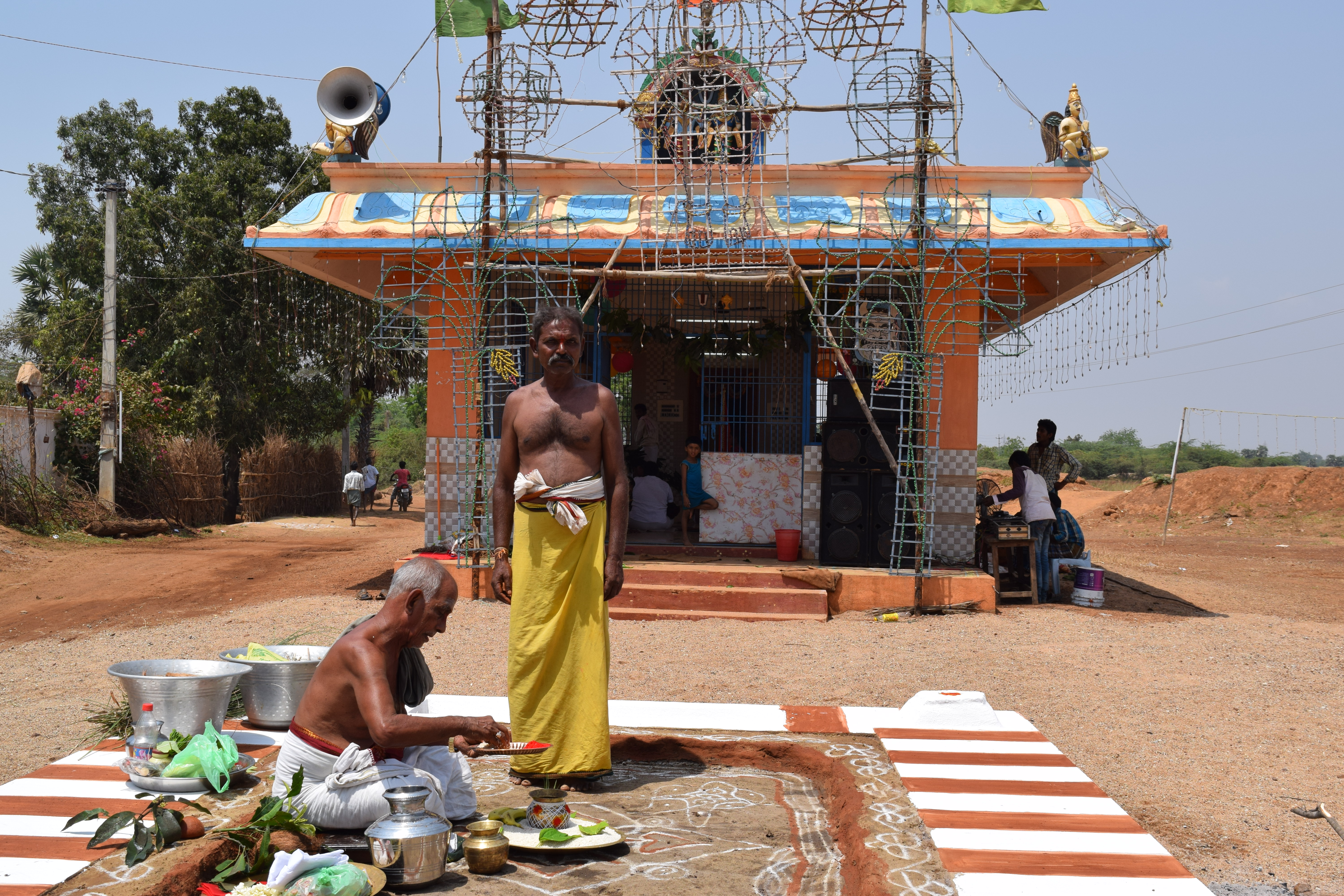
Sri Panduranga Swamy temple

All the population belongs to Hindu religion. Every year in month of March on full moon day (Pournami)Sri Panduranga Swamy Brahmotsavalu is celebrated. One the eve of this festival, the devotees walk on fire (Agnigundam).

Temples

- Sri Rama Temple: the oldest temple, which was renovated in 2010.
- Sri Panduranga Swamy Temple: constructed in 2015.

Village deities

- Goddess Chemuramma: A Neem tree situated to the East side of the village. Every year, on one Friday, the villagers offer prayers to this goddess with animal sacrifice.
- Goddess Ankamma: A Neem tree situated to the North-West side of the village. Here also, the villagers offer prayers on a Sunday every year with animal sacrifice.

== Climate ==
It has a hot and humid climate. The hottest part of the year is May to early June with maximum temperatures around 35-42 °C. The coolest part of the year is January with a minimum temperature of 19-25 °C.

It gets most of its rain fall from seasonal monsoon winds from August to December. This place is also affected by Cyclones from the Bay of Bengal.
