= List of waterfalls in Andhra Pradesh =

The waterfalls in Andhra Pradesh of India are formed by the waters of the tributaries of the Godavari, Krishna and Nagavali rivers.

S.No.	Name	Location	Height	Ref
1	Kailasakona falls	Nagari Valley, Chittoor district		
2	Penchalakona Falls	Nellore district		
3	Kaigal falls (Dumukuralla falls)	Chittoor district		
4	Ethipothala Falls	Macherla mandal, Guntur district		
5	Talakona Falls	Sri Venkateswara National Park, Tirupati district		
6	Ubbalamadugu Falls (TADA Falls)	Nallamala Forest, Tirupati district		
7	Leela waterfalls	Salur, Andhra Pradesh |Above 300 Feet|		
8	Thonam waterfalls	Salur, Andhra Pradesh		
9	Salugu waterfalls	Paderu, Andhra Pradesh		
10	Kudiki waterfalls	Paderu, Andhra Pradesh		
11	Dharapalli waterfalls	Peddipalem, Kakinada district, Prathipadu mandal, Andhra Pradesh		
