= Kalki Bhagawan =

Indian spiritual teacher (1949–2026)

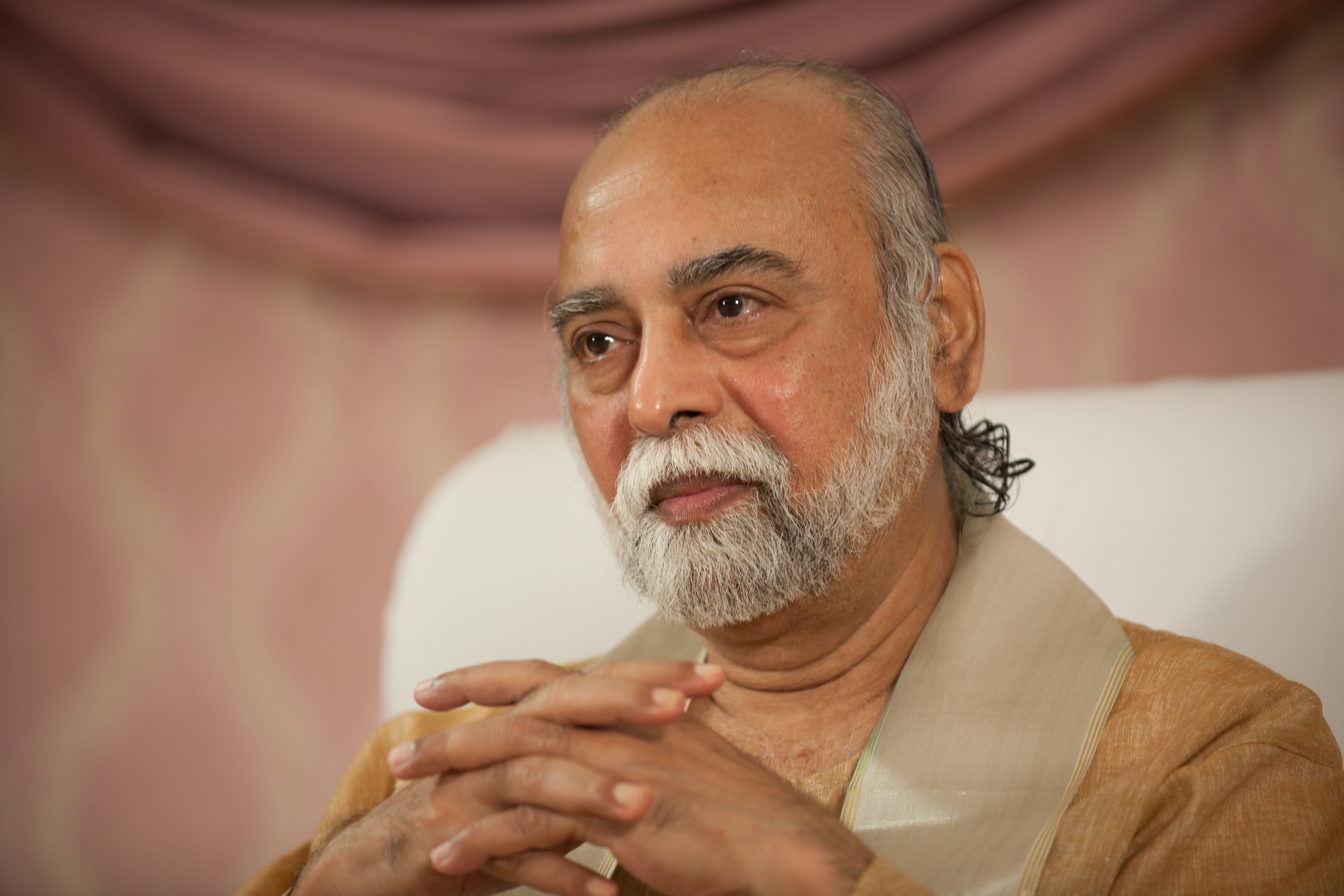
- Born: Vijay Kumar Naidu; 7 March 1949; Natham, Madras State, India
- Died: 29 September 2026 (aged 77); Chennai, Tamil Nadu, India
- Other names: Sri Bhagavan, Amma Bhagavan (as a couple)
- Education: DG Vaishnav College, Chennai
- Spouse: Padmavathi (m. 1977)

Kalki Bhagawan (born Vijay Kumar Naidu, 7 March 1949 – 29 September 2026), also known as Sri Bhagavan, was an Indian spiritual teacher. He was the founder of a spiritual organization called Oneness which has its headquarters in Varadaiahpalem, Tirupati district in Andhra Pradesh.

== Early life ==
Bhagavan (front row centre) with his son NKV Krishna (back row left) and wife Padmavathi (back row centre). Circa 1990

Bhagavan was born as Vijay Kumar Naidu on 7 March 1949 in Natham village, Vellore district in Madras State (now Tamil Nadu), to Vaidarbhi Amma and Sri Varadarajulu. His father was the head of the accounts department of Indian Railways.

== Education and early career ==
In 1955, his family moved to Chennai where he attended Don Bosco School. In his childhood he was introduced to the philosophy of Jiddu Krishnamurti by his friend R. Sankar. He graduated from DG Vaishnav College in Chennai, majoring in mathematics. After completing college, he worked as an office clerk for the Life Insurance Corporation of India (LIC).

== Marriage ==
Bhagawan married Padmavathi on 9 June 1977, following the customary practice in India where marriages are decided by elders in the family. Padmavathi, also known as "Amma" by the followers, participated in building the Oneness spiritual organization.

== Work ==
In 1984, Bhagavan established a residential school called Jeevashram in Chittoor District, Andhra Pradesh, to provide an alternative form of education with the goal of "developing an environment for children to discover themselves and reach their full potential".

In 1994, the Jeevashram school campus was renamed to Satyaloka and spiritual programmes for the public were started. In 2000, he subsequently founded the Oneness organization with the stated mission to create "lasting spiritual transformation" and to alleviate human suffering "at its roots by awakening humanity into Oneness and transforming the world into a better place".

During the early stages of the movement, Bhagavan was regarded by his followers as Kalki, the tenth incarnation of Vishnu and his work was locally referred to as the "Kalki movement". Bhagavan also stated that "although this is the time for Kalki's emergence, Kalki is not one person but a collective awakening".

The organization's work includes the practice of giving and receiving the "Oneness Blessing", also known as the Deeksha, which is a technique of "energy transmission to usher the receiver into a state of higher consciousness". The practice does not require initiation into following a new path.

Bhagavan believed that when a critical mass of people has received the "Oneness Blessing", it would affect the "collective DNA" of humanity, resulting as an "Age of Enlightenment", which will take few decades to fully take effect. Followers of the movement have reported psychosomatic ailments to have been healed by the "Oneness Blessing". In 2004, Carl Johan Calleman (based on the Mayan calendar), collaborated with Bhagavan to initiate a festival called Oneness Celebration. On 21 December 2012, worldwide events were conducted by the Oneness organization.

Kosmik Music, is a music label producing titles ranging from traditional to spiritual and fusion tracks. "Sacred Chants" containing traditional Vedic hymns are one of its successful brands. Bhagavan also had investments in real estate, property development, energy, media and sports.

In 2017, the Oneness organization along with his business interests were handed over to Bhagavan's son, NKV Krishna and daughter-in-law Preetha Krishna. The organization was renamed to Ekam. Over the years, the Oneness movement has been known by various names including the Foundation for World Awakening, Golden Age Foundation, Bhagavad Dharma, Kalki Dharma, Oneness University and Oneness Organization.

== Death ==
Bhagavan died on 29 September 2026 at a private hospital in Chennai, where he had been undergoing treatment. He was 77.

== Teachings ==
Bhagavan's stated belief was that the cause for human suffering is the sense of a separate self that each individual experiences that gives each the feeling of "me and a not-me", which is what causes conflicts in families, relationships and wars between nations. According to him, enlightenment is a neurobiological process in which this sense of separate self ends.

There are no required set of texts or doctrines in the Oneness movement. Though the founder Bhagavan's writings or sayings are used as teachings, the movement's emphasis is for followers to acquire direct personal experience. It does not dictate conversion.

The Oneness movement sees its message as compatible with major religious traditions, and simultaneously allows cultural adaptation of the teachings.

== Issues ==
In 2002, a public interest litigation for income tax probe of the Kalki Trust was dismissed and rejected by the Madras High Court and subsequently by the Indian Supreme Court.

In 2019, the Income Tax department officials seized cash and gold from properties owned by Bhagavan's son with total estimated value worth Rs 93 crore.

== Criticisms ==
Freddy Nielsen, his associate from Sweden, left him in 2005 after directing criticism against the Oneness movement.

== Publications ==
=== Books ===
- Bhagavan, Sri (2017). Love Begins with Accepting Yourself. ISBN 978-957-43-5100-8.
- Bhagavan, Sri (2019). Activating Your Inner Success Codes. ISBN 978-957-43-6838-9.

== See also ==
- Ekam - The Oneness Temple
- Diksha
- Antaryamin
