= Talari Aditya =

Indian politician

Talari Aditya Tarachandrakanth (born 1985) is an Indian politician from Andhra Pradesh. He was a former member of the Andhra Pradesh Legislative Assembly from Satyavedu Assembly constituency which was reserved for Scheduled Caste community in the then Chittoor district. He represents Telugu Desam Party and won in 2014.

== Early life ==
Tarachandrakanth is from Satyavedu, Chittoor district, Andhra Pradesh. He is the son of Talari Manohar, a former TDP MLA from the same constituency. He completed his Master of Science in financial management at University of Central Lancashire, United Kingdom in 2008. He runs his own business. He declared assets worth Rs.25 lakhs in his affidavit to the Election Commission of India.

== Career ==
Tarachandakanth won from Satyavedu Assembly constituency in the 2014 Andhra Pradesh Legislative Assembly election representing the Telugu Desam Party. He polled 77,655 votes and defeated his nearest rival, Koneti Adimulam of the YSR Congress Party, by a margin of 4,227 votes.
