= Buchinaidu Kandriga mandal =

Buchinaidu Kandriga mandal B. N. Kandriga mandal
- Mandal
- Interactive map of Buchinaidu Kandriga mandal
- Location in Andhra Pradesh, India
- Coordinates: 13°42′42.624″N 79°51′12.420″E
- Country: India
- State: Andhra Pradesh
- District: Tirupati
- Headquarters: Kanamanambedu

Government
  - Body: Mandal Parishad

Population (2011)
  - Total: 34,261

Languages
  - Official: Telugu
- Time zone: UTC+5:30 (IST)

Buchinaidu Kandriga mandal or B. N. Kandriga mandal is one of the 36 mandals in Tirupati district of the Indian state of Andhra Pradesh. The mandal headquarters are located at Kanamanambedu. The mandal is bounded by Varadaiahpalem, K.V.B. Puram, Thottambedu mandals.

== Demographics ==
As of 2011 census, the mandal had a population of 34,261. The total population constitute, 17,097 males and 17,164 females —a sex ratio of 1004 females per 1000 males. 4,170 children are in the age group of 0–6 years, of which 2,129 are boys and 2,041 are girls. The average literacy rate stands at 65.39% with 19,677 literates.

== Administration ==
The mandal was a part of Chittoor district and was made a part of the newly formed Tirupati district on 4 April 2022. It is a part of Sullurupeta revenue division.

== Towns and villages ==
As of 2011 census, the mandal has 24 villages.

The settlements in the mandal are listed below:

1. Alathur
2. Bhavanisankarapuram
3. Chellamambapuram
4. Chinnayyagunta
5. Gajulapellore
6. Kallivettu
7. Kanamanambedu †
8. Kanchanaputtur
9. Katur
10. Kothapalem
11. Kukkambakam
12. Kumara Venkatapuram
13. Neerpakota
14. Nelavoy
15. Pallamala
16. Parlapalle
17. Peddapalavedu
18. Putteri
19. Talarivettu
20. Thangellapuram
21. Therripadu
22. Thimmabhupalapuram
23. Vijayagopalapuram
24. West Warathur
- † – Mandal Headquarters

== See also ==
- List of mandals in Andhra Pradesh
