= Dandolu Chennareddy =

Indian Political Figure (1833-unknown)

Personal details
- Born: Dandolu Chennareddy; 1833-1900 Dandavolu, Dakkili mandal, Andhra State, India (present-day Andhra Pradesh, India)
- Children: 2 (Ramireddy, Saiappareddy)

Dandolu Chennareddy (1833–?) was born/raised at Danda-Volu village, Kadapa district, Andhra Pradesh, India.

He was married with children: a daughter Dandolu Narasamma, and sons Dandolu Ramireddy & Dandolu Saiappareddy.

== Background and uprising ==
After the British increased the tax on his tobacco estate, which Chennareddy disliked, he decided to oppose the rule with the guidelines of his brother-in-law of Uyyalawada Narasimha Reddy. Thus later partial estate became part of British India.

== Reign ==
He was the head of Rapuru subdivision (samantha raja) and in command of 11 villages around Rapuru, lived in Pokura Palli, a small village near Venkatagiri, now part of Nellore District. He built many water ponds and wells for farming and villagers, which still exist around Kandaleru Dam. He was a devotee of Ankamma talli Goddess Laxmi.

He was also a revenue minister for Venkatigiri Raja Maharaja Sir Rajagopala Krishna Yachendra.

He personalized a popular song in region "auyra chennappareddy nee pera bangarakaddi..." This song is still popular as praise song.

He belongs to category of Pakanati Reddy Pakanati group, few popular people who are popular in this group Neelam Sanjiva Reddy, AC Subbareddy

== Modern history ==
In the late 20th century, a film project was initiated in Madras (present-day Chennai) based on the life of Dandolu Chennareddy, a noted historical figure. The project was planned with Krishnam Raju in the lead role and was produced under the banner of filmmaker Rudrabupathi. The screenplay and dialogues were reportedly developed by the Paruchuri Brothers, who were approached for the project after their early works gained attention. A first-look concept and several months of initial shooting were completed; however, the film was eventually halted and did not progress to full production. The project remains an unfinished attempt to bring the story of Dandolu Chennareddy and his lineage to mainstream cinema.

=== Monuments ===
Reddy's primary house and cow shelters later in the 1950s became a primary school (up to 5th grade) in Pokurapalli. His farmland, estates were left by his hereditary to the relatives and villagers to farm and later gone under Kandaleru Dam
