= Krishnarjuna Yudham =

Krishnarjuna Yuddham
- Theatrical release poster
- Directed by: Merlapaka Gandhi
- Written by: Merlapaka Gandhi
- Produced by: Sahu Garapati; Harish Peddi
- Starring: Nani; Anupama Parameswaran; Rukshar Dhillon
- Cinematography: Karthik Gattamneni
- Edited by: Satya Giduturi
- Music by: Hiphop Tamizha
- Production company: Shine Screens
- Distributed by: Sri Venkateswara Films
- Release date: 12 April 2018
- Running time: 154 minutes
- Country: India
- Language: Telugu
- Box office: est. ₹28.60 crore

Krishnarjuna Yudham (transl. War of Krishna and Arjuna) is a 2018 Indian Telugu-language action comedy film written and directed by Merlapaka Gandhi and produced by Sahu Garapati and Harish Peddi under Shine Screens banner. The film stars Nani, Anupama Parameswaran, Rukshar Dhillon. Nani played a dual role for the third time after Janda Pai Kapiraju and Gentleman. Part of the film was shot in Prague, Czech Republic. The film opened worldwide on 12 April 2018 to mixed reviews, with praise for Nani's acting but criticism of the screenplay, lag in second half, its farfetchedness and its formulaic story.

== Plot ==
Krishna and Arjun Jayaprakash are lookalikes hailing from Akkurthi village in Chittoor and from Prague, respectively. While the former is a happy-go-lucky individual, the latter is a rockstar and a flirt. Krishna falls in love with the village president's granddaughter Riya, a doctor. Arjun loves a traditional Indian girl Subbalakshmi, a wildlife photographer. In the village, Riya's grandfather discovers her relationship with Krishna and sends her to Hyderabad, and Krishna follows her. Meanwhile, Subbalakshmi starts to hate Arjun because of his flirting nature. In a certain incident, her professional camera is damaged by Arjun's manager Brahmaji, which contains a rare photograph. Arjun realizes he really loves her and goes to her aunt's house to convince her, but she thinks it is one of his tricks to make her fall in love with him. Subbalakshmi leaves Prague and returns to India, and Arjun follows her. In Hyderabad, Riya and Subbalakshmi are kidnapped by a trafficking gang who plan on sending them to Dubai. Upon reaching Hyderabad, Krishna and Arjun realize that neither of the girls has reached home and begin searching for them. How Krishna and Arjun try to track down the traffickers to rescue the girls forms the climax of the story.

== Cast ==
- Nani as Krishna and Arjun Jayaprakash
- Anupama Parameswaran as Subbalakshmi
- Rukshar Dhillon as Riya
- Brahmaji as Brahmaji, Arjun's manager
- Devadarshini as Dhinchak Roja, Subbalakshmi's aunt
- Nagineedu as Riya's grandfather
- Ravi Awana as Bhai (Head of Woman Trafficking)
- Temper Vamsi as Kidnaper
- Prabhas Sreenu as Shankar
- Hari Teja as Shankar's wife
- Vidyullekha Raman as Call Center Girl
- Pooja Ramachandran as Nikki
- Alapati Lakshmi as Krishna's mother
- Kalpa Latha as Riya's mother
- Chatrapathi Sekhar as Bhai's henchmen
- Sudharshan as Krishna’s friend
- Mirchi Hemanth as TV Journalist
- Neelya Bhavani as Doctor
- Ruhika Dass as Jessy
- Sudhakar
- Rajeshwari Pamidighantam
- Mashesh Vitta as Karri Seenu
- Sudarshan Reddy
- Chandrashekhar
- Chintu
- Master Arya

== Soundtrack ==
Krishnarjuna Yudham

Soundtrack album by Hiphop Tamizha
- Released: 2018
- Recorded: 2018
- Genre: Feature film soundtrack
- Length: 22:15
- Producer: Hiphop Tamizha

Hiphop Tamizha chronology
Kalakalappu 2 (2018)	Krishnarjuna Yudham (2018)	Imaikka Nodigal (2018)

The duo Hiphop Tamizha composed the music for the film. This is their second Telugu film after Dhruva. 'Turn This Party Up' is a peppy rock number. 'Dhaari Choodu' is a folk song which has typical Chittoor dialect. 'I Wanna Fly' is a soothing melody which has two versions composed parallelly. 'Ela Ela' is a heartbreak montage love song. 'Urime Manase' is yet another breakup number. 'Thaaney Vachhindhanaa' is a slow and pleasant melody.

No.	Title	Lyrics	Singer(s)	Length
1.	"I Wanna Fly"	Sreejo, Hiphop Tamizha	L. V. Revanth, Sanjith Hegde, Hiphop Tamizha	3:53
2.	"Urime Manase"	Sreejo	Raghu Dixit	4:37
3.	"Dhaari Choodu"	Penchal Das	Penchal Das	3:12
4.	"Turn This Party Up"	Hiphop Tamizha	Hiphop Tamizha, Brodha V	3:26
5.	"Ela Ela"	Sri Mani	Yazin Nizar, Hiphop Tamizha	3:45
6.	"Thaaney Vachhindhanaa"	K.K.	Kaala Bhairava, Padmalatha	4:38
Total length:				22:15

== Release ==
=== Marketing ===
Dil Raju acquired distribution rights for the film in the Telugu states. In its pre-release business, the film earned Rs 35 crore from its global theatrical rights, Rs 7 crore from its satellite rights sold Star Maa, Rs 4.50 crore from its Hindi dubbing rights and Rs 50 lakh from its music and other rights.

== Reception ==
=== Critical response ===
The film received mixed reviews from critics. Neeshita Nyayapati, from Times of India rated the film 2.5/5 and wrote 'Walking away from the film, the only memories that one takes back happy is the vision of Nani dancing to ‘Dhaari Choodu’ with childish abandon, the humorous scenes that elevate the first half and the fact that his friend spells Riya's name as Royya. For a film that touches the subject of human trafficking, it sure bombs at making a point.'

Sangeetha Devi Dundoo from The Hindu, while praising the acting performance of Nani as Krishna and the picturization of Dhaari Choodu song, also wrote, 'on the whole, Krishnarjuna Yuddham doesn't get its rhythm right. There was a time, not long ago, when Nani's name was associated with films that stood out from the clutter. This one had the potential to be a fusion of global and local music, the way Arjun wanted it to be, but ends up a mess'.

Hemanth Kumar from Firstpost rated the film 2/5 and wrote, 'there's a notion that the film has all the necessary elements - vastly different characters, a conflict, an issue it tries to address - to make for an engaging drama, but on the other side, there's the image of me sitting in the cinema hall not knowing what to make of the film because it struggles to find its rhythm and doesn't build the drama efficiently'

=== Box office ===
The film collected $162K from its US premiers. On opening day, the film collected Rs 4.58 crores in the Telugu states. This is the fourth biggest opening for Nani, falling behind ‘MCA’, ‘Ninnu Kori’ and ‘Eega’. MCA had reportedly raked in Rs 7.57 Cr on its opening day, ‘Ninnu Kori’ Rs 4.72 Cr and ‘Eega’ Rs 4.61 Cr.

The film was made on a budget of 30 crores and only recovered 14.50 crores. It could not even recover 50% at the box office, labeling it as Nani's first disaster since 2014.
