= Chitvel =

- village
- Nickname: Chitvelu
- Interactive map of Chitvel
- Location in Andhra Pradesh, India
- Coordinates: 14.1667°N 79.3333°E
- Country: India
- State: Andhra Pradesh
- District: Tirupati
- Elevation: 132 m (433 ft)

Languages
  - Official: Telugu, Urdu
- Time zone: UTC+5:30 (IST)
- PIN: 516104
- Telephone code: 08566
- Vehicle registration: AP-04, AP-39

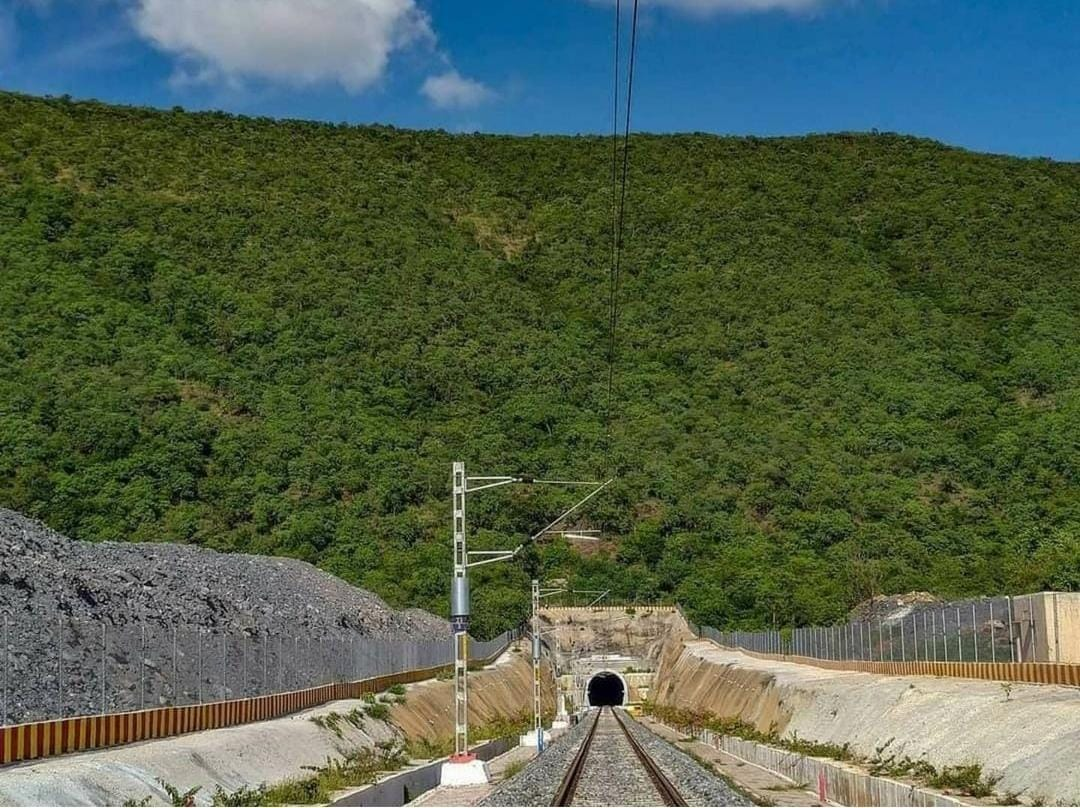
Obulavaripalle–Krishnapatnam railway Tunnel at chitvel

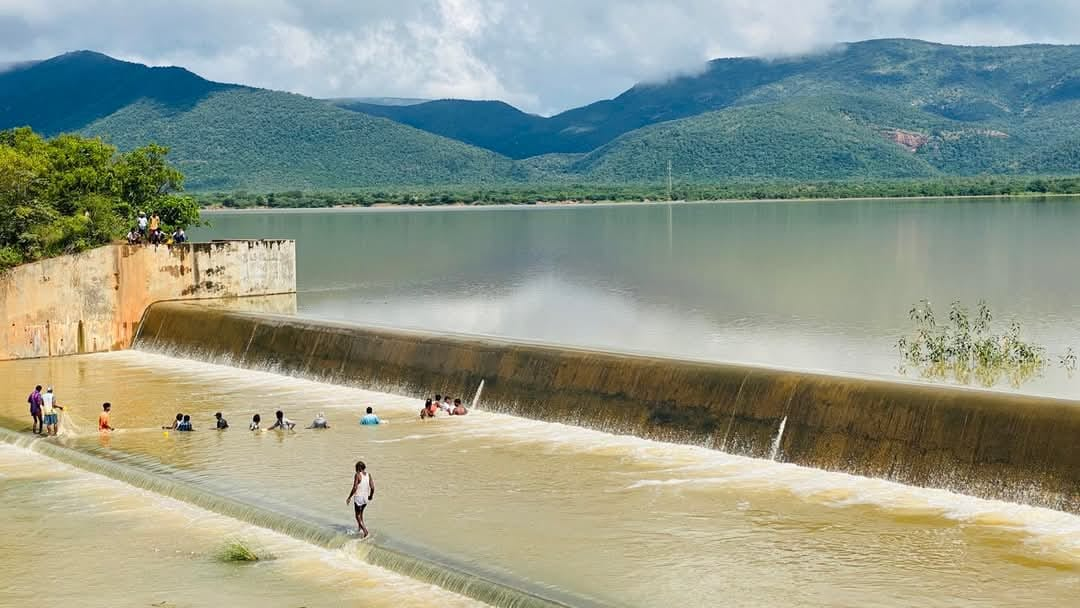
Yellama Raju Cheruvu .Chitvel

Chitvel is a village in Tirupati district of the Indian state of Andhra Pradesh. It is located in Chitvel mandal of Tirupati in the Rayalaseema Region. Chitvel has India's longest electrified railway tunnel between Chitvel and Rapur, 6.6 km long. This line connects Obulavaripalli-Krishnapatnam port and was opened by vice president M. Venkaiah Naidu on Aug 21, 2019.This is the main railway line in this area.

Sights and attractions around chitvel is Gundalakona, a regionally famous Lord Shiva temple and Guttamaneru Dam

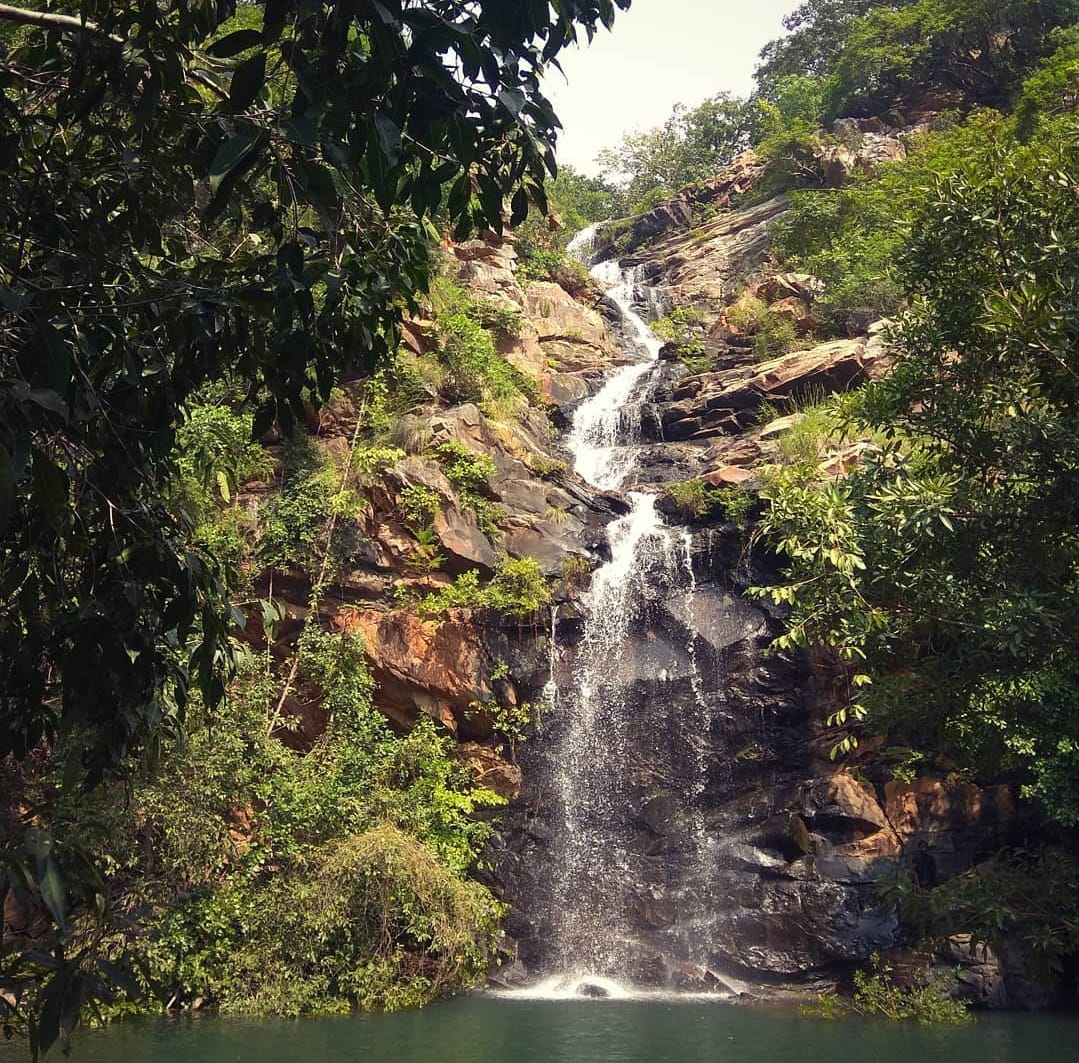
Gundalakona waterfalls

== Geography ==
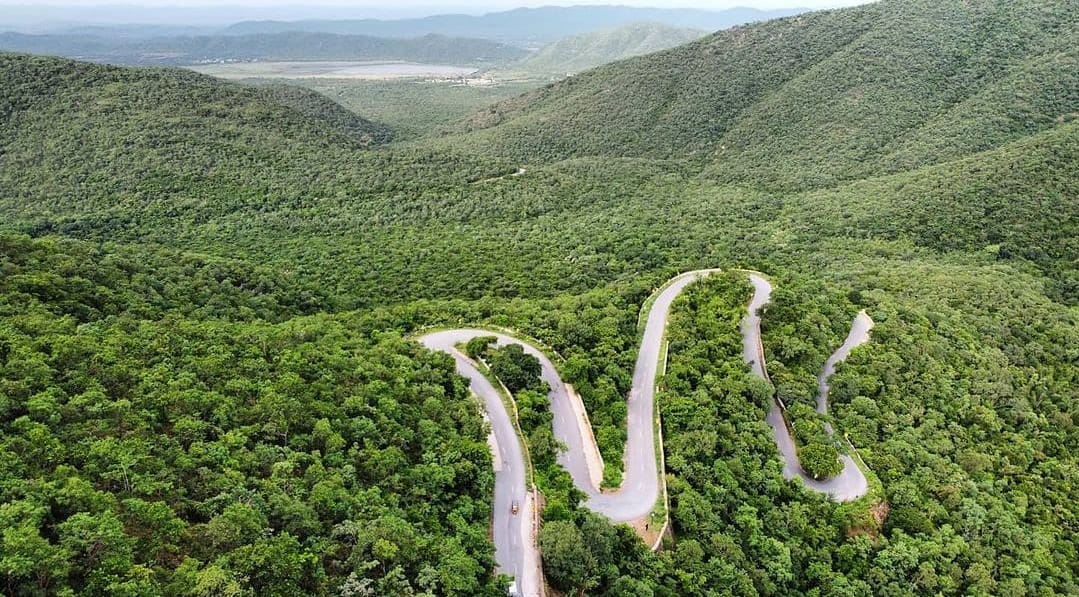
Rapur & Chitvel Ghat Road at Chitvel

Chitvel is located at 14.1667°N 79.3333°E. It has an average elevation of 132 meters (436 feet).

== Notable people ==
1.Penchal Das singer, songwriter, and poet in the telugu film industry
