= Narayanavanam mandal =

Mandal in Tirupati district, Andhra Pradesh, India

Narayanavanam mandal నారాయణవనం మండలం
- Mandal
- Interactive map of Narayanavanam mandal
- Location within Andhra Pradesh Location within India
- Coordinates: 13°24′14″N 79°34′37″E
- Country: India
- State: Andhra Pradesh
- District: Tirupati
- Revenue division: Srikalahasti

Area
  - Mandal: 114 km^{2} (44 sq mi)

Population (2011)
  - Mandal: 37,041
  - Density: 325/km^{2} (842/sq mi)
  - Urban: 2,802
  - Rural: 6,564
- Time zone: UTC+05:30 (IST)

Narayanavanam mandal (Telugu: నారాయణవనం మండలం) is one of the 36 mandals in Tirupati district in the Indian state of Andhra Pradesh. It is administered as a part of Srikalahasti revenue division.

== History ==
Narayanavanam mandal was a part of Chittoor district until 2022. It was made part of the newly formed Tirupati district effective from 4 April 2022.

== Demographics ==
Religions in Narayanavanam mandal (2011)
Religion	Percent
Hindus	99.32%
Muslims	0.41%
Christians	0.07%
Others or not stated	0.20%
Distribution of religions

As per 2011 census, Narayanavanam mandal had a total population of 37,041 with 18,658 male population and 18,383 female population with a density of 324.9/km^{2}. It had a sex ratio of 985. The Scheduled Castes and Scheduled Tribes made up 10,417 and 1,983 of the population respectively. It had a literacy rate of 71.46% with 80.44% among males and 62.39% among females.

== Administration ==
Narayanavanam mandal is a part of Srikalahasti revenue division. As of 2011 census, the mandal comprises Narayanavanam census town and the following 15 villages:

Village
Aranyam Khandriga
Bheemunicheruvu
Boppa Raju Palem
Diguvakanakam Palem
Erikambattu
Ipppam Thangal
Kalyanapuram
Kasimmitta
Keelagaram
Kondalacheruvu
Palamangalam Dakshini
Samudayam
Thiruvatyam
Thumbur
Venkata Krishna Palem

== Politics ==
Narayanavanam mandal is a part of Satyavedu Assembly constituency and Tirupati Lok Sabha constituency. As of 8 October 2018, the mandal had 24,544 eligible voters with 12,216 male voters and 12,328 female voters.
