= Chitvel mandal =

Mandal in Tirupati district, Andhra Pradesh, India

- Mandal
- Interactive map of Chitvel mandal
- Country: India
- State: Andhra Pradesh
- District: Tirupati
- Headquarters: Chitvel
- Time zone: UTC+05:30 (IST)

Chitvel mandal is one of the 36 mandals in Tirupati district in the Indian state of Andhra Pradesh. It is a part of Tirupati revenue division.

== History ==
The mandal used to be a part of Annamayya district and was made part of the Tirupati district on 31 December 2025.
