= Sreekaram =

2021 Indian Telugu-language drama film

Sreekaaram
- Theatrical release poster
- Directed by: Kishor B
- Written by: Kishor B
- Produced by: Ram Achanta; Gopichand Achanta
- Starring: Sharwanand; Priyanka Mohan
- Cinematography: J. Yuvaraj
- Edited by: Marthand K. Venkatesh
- Music by: Mickey J. Meyer
- Production company: 14 Reels Plus Entertainment
- Release date: 11 March 2021
- Running time: 132 minutes
- Country: India
- Language: Telugu

Sreekaaram (transl. Inauguration) is a 2021 Indian Telugu-language drama film directed by Kishor B and produced by 14 Reels Plus studio. Kishore wrote the script with dialogues by Sai Madhav Burra. The film stars Sharwanand and Priyanka Mohan with Sai Kumar in a pivotal role.

The film's production commenced in August 2019. It has music scored by Mickey J. Meyer with cinematography and editing by J. Yuvaraj and Marthand K. Venkatesh respectively. Initially scheduled to release on 24 April 2020, it was postponed due to the COVID-19 pandemic. The film is theatrically released on 11 March 2021.

== Plot ==
Karthik is a happy-go-lucky software engineer. Since his father has many debts, he sends money to his father. Chaitra has been in love with Karthik since their college days and tries hard to woo him, but he seems uninterested. She even comes with her mother to talk to Karthik for a love recommendation. Meanwhile, Karthik gets promoted to manager at the US branch of his company. Everyone was happy, but because all his debts were paid, Karthik decides to quit his job and become a farmer. When Chaitra asks Karthik to meet her father, he politely declines, saying that although he likes her, he plans to be a farmer. This upsets Chaitra's father, and he forbids her from seeing Karthik. Karthik's father is disappointed with his son's decision and avoids talking to him. Karthik later realizes that everyone in his village who works in the city is leading a very hard life. He calls all the villagers to a meeting and tells them to return to the village to start farming. At first, everyone disagrees with the idea and leaves, but later, a few villagers decide to start farming. When they approach Karthik, he has an idea of Ummadi Vyavasayam (Collective farming in Telugu). They all like the idea and start getting all the supplies.

Later, Chaitra returns to Karthik and also does farming. Ekambaram, the zamindar of the village, wants to steal all their lands and name their village Ekambarapuram, but Karthik spoils all of his plans. After they sell their first crop, Karthik wants to use that money to help a fellow villager. Some of the villagers did not like the idea but reluctantly agreed. Later, Ekambaram spreads rumors to the villagers that Karthik is using their lands for his own profit. Some of them believe Ekambaram and build fences around their farm. Karthik's father, who is still not on good terms with him, asks him to sign the land papers so he can sell them for his daughter's marriage. Karthik disagrees, and his father leaves the village and moves to the city away from him. Meanwhile, a novel Corona virus causes a pandemic, and all the roads are blocked; thus, crops were not sent to the market. Then, Karthik gets the idea for a app called 'Sreekaram' that directly sells crops to buyers instead of supermarkets. The buyers could place orders and would get sanitized goods delivered to their homes.

Later, Karthik discovers Ekambaram's plan and confronts him. After a talk, Ekambaram realizes his mistake and starts helping the villagers. Soon, all their crops are sold, and the app becomes a big hit. Other villagers who left him earlier return to the village and join them. Karthik's parents return home, too. In the end, Karthik and Chaitra reunite as their parents meet at their sister's marriage.

== Cast ==
- Sharwanand as Karthik
- Priyanka Mohan as Chaitra
- Rao Ramesh as Kesavulu, Karthik's father
- Sai Kumar as Ekambaram
- Naresh as Ramana, Karthik's uncle
- Murali Sharma as Murali, Chaitra's father
- Aamani as Janaki, Karthik's mother
- Sri Gouri Priya as Bujji, Karthik's sister
- Satya as Karthik's friend
- Shishir Sharma as Karthik's manager
- Giri Babu as Anantha Raju, Ekambaram's father-in-law
- Chandra Mohan as Chandram
- Brahmanandam as Venky, Karthik's friend
- Sapthagiri as Karthik's colleague
- Prabhas Sreenu as Ekambaram's brother-in-law
- Mamilla Shailaja Priya as Ekambaram's wife
- Madhumani as Ramana's wife
- Dhethadi Harika as Chaitra's friend
- Ravi Teja Mahadasyam as Ravi, Karthik's colleague
- Swapnika as Karthik's colleague
- Rajsekhar Aningi as a farmer
- Devi Prasad
- Rafsan Shahriar
- Mohit Pedada as a CS student

== Production ==
In October 2018, it was reported that Nani was approached for a project by 14 Reels Entertainment's Ram and Gopi Achanta. Directed by debutant filmmaker Kishore Reddy, the lead would play the role of a farmer. However, Sharwanand was confirmed for the role. Titled Sreekaram, the film was launched formally with a puja ceremony on 30 June 2019 at the office of 14 Reels Plus with Sukumar clapping the first shot. The film was based on Kiran Abbavaram's short film of the same name.

Priyanka Mohan was cast in a lead role in July 2019. Principal photography of the film commenced in August 2019 in Hyderabad. Village portions were scheduled to be filmed near Anantapur and Tirupati in November 2019.

The final leg of the film's shoot was scheduled in March 2020 in Hyderabad. However, the shoot was postponed due to the COVID-19 pandemic lockdown in India. Filming resumed in October 2020 and a 20-day schedule was completed in Tirupati.

== Soundtrack ==
Sreekaram

Soundtrack album by Mickey J. Meyer
- Released: 2021
- Recorded: 2020
- Genre: Feature film soundtrack
- Language: Telugu
- Label: Sony Music India
- Producer: Mickey J. Meyer

Mickey J. Meyer chronology
Iddari Lokam Okate (2019)	Sreekaram (2021)	Shyam Singha Roy (2021)

Singles from Sreekaram
- 1. "Bhalegundi Baalaa" Released: 9 November 2020; 2. "Sandalle Sandalle" Released: 7 January 2021

The music for the film is composed by Mickey J. Meyer. On 5 November 2020, the makers released the promo of the first single titled as "Bhalegundi Baalaa", which had lyrics written by Penchal Das, also providing the male vocals of the song, while female vocals were rendered by Nutana Mohan. The full song was released by Lahari Music on 9 November 2020. On 7 January 2021, the makers unveiled the promo of the song "Sandalle Sandalle" which had lyrics written by Sanapati Bharadwaj Patrudu, and vocals by Anurag Kulkarni and Mohana Bhogaraju, and the full song was released the same day.

No.	Title	Lyrics	Singer(s)	Length
1.	"Bhalegundi Baalaa"	Penchal Das	Penchal Das, Nutana Mohan	4:27
2.	"Sandalle Sandalle"	Sanapati Bharadwaj Patrudu	Anurag Kulkarni, Mohana Bhogaraju	3:41
3.	"Hey Abbayi"	Krishna Kanth	Hymath, Nutana Mohan	3:42
4.	"Sreekaram (Title Song)"	Ramajogayya Sastry	Prudhvi Chandra	4:21
5.	"Alisina Soopulalo"	Sanapati Bharadwaj Patrudu	Mohana Bhogaraju	1.58

== Release ==
The film was originally scheduled to release on the Sankranthi occasion, although in order to avoid clash with Ala Vaikunthapurramuloo & Sarileru Neekevvaru, the makers postponed its release to summer. On 1 February 2020, the makers announced the release date as 24 April 2020. However, the release was postponed due to the COVID-19 pandemic. In September 2020, the filmmakers entered discussions to release the film via over-the-top media services. The film was theatrically released on 11 March 2021. The film was dubbed and released in Tamil under the same title, Sreekaram.

== Reception ==
Y. Sunitha Chowdhary of The Hindu called it a "Routine film on farming." She felt that well-intended film could have benefited from a better plot and screenplay. The Times of India critic Thadhagadh Pathi rated the film 3/5 and wrote: "Sreekaram is an honest attempt to shine light on the plight of the farmers in our country and to show the future generation how it can be a viable profession," however the reviewer added that film should have been more realistic in its approach.
