= Dakkili =

- Village
- Interactive map of Dakkili
- Location in Andhra Pradesh, India
- Coordinates: 14.1066823°N 79.5512119°E
- Country: India
- State: Andhra Pradesh
- District: Tirupati
- Mandal: Dakkili

Population (2011)
  - Total: 2,433

Languages
  - Official: Telugu
- Time zone: UTC+5:30 (IST)

Dakkili is a village located in the Dakkili mandal of Tirupati district of Andhra Pradesh, India. It is located near the border of Nellore district .
