= Kanamanambedu =

- Village
- Interactive map of Kanamanambedu
- Location in Andhra Pradesh, India
- Coordinates: 13°42′42.624″N 79°51′12.420″E
- Country: India
- State: Andhra Pradesh
- District: Tirupati
- Mandal: Buchinaidu Kandriga mandal

Languages
  - Official: Telugu
- Time zone: UTC+5:30 (IST)
- Vehicle registration: AP40

Kanamanambedu is a village in Tirupati district of the Indian state of Andhra Pradesh. It is the headquarters of Buchinaidu Kandriga mandal.

== Geography ==
Kanamanambedu is located at 13°42′42.624″N 79°51′12.420″E
