= Kalyana Venkateswara Temple, Narayanavanam =

Hindu temple in India

Kalyana Venkateswara Swamy Temple కల్యాణ వేంకటేశ్వర స్వామి ఆలయం
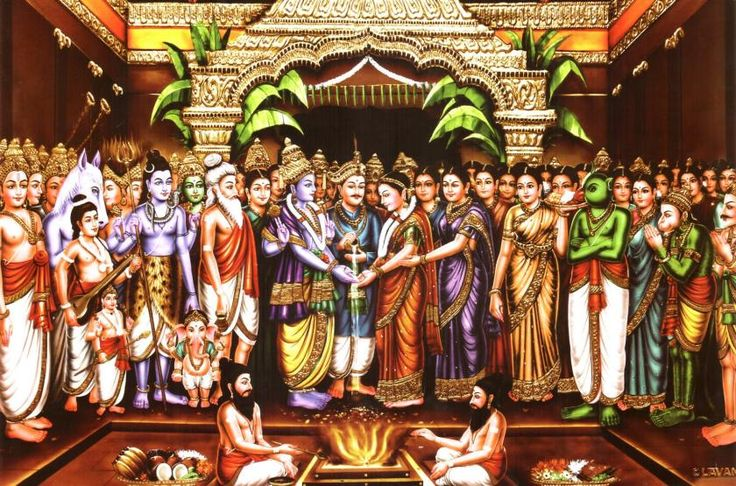

Religion
- Affiliation: Hinduism
- District: Tirupati district
- Deity: Venkateswara Padmavati

Location
- Location: Narayanavanam
- State: Andhra Pradesh
- Country: India

Architecture
- Completed: 1541 AD

Sri Kalyana Venkateswara Swamy Temple is a Hindu temple situated at Narayanavanam, a town in Tirupati district of Andhra Pradesh state, India. The Temple is dedicated to Kalyana Venkateswara, a form of Vishnu. The temple is situated at 2 km east of Puttur and 45 km south of Tirupati. It is believed that Venkateswara married his consort Padmavathi at this place and then moved to Tirumala.

== Legend ==
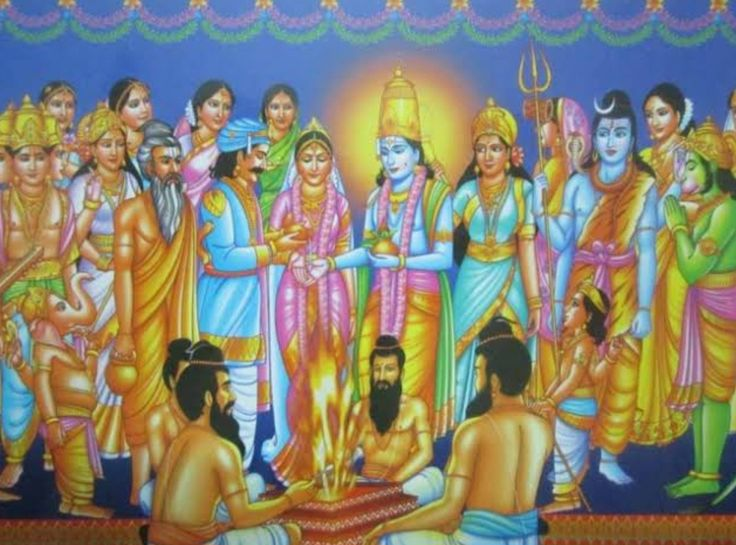

As per legend, Narayanavanam is the capital of King Akasaraja, who is ruling this region. Akasaraja performed the marriage of his daughter Padmavati, the presiding deity of Padmavathi Temple, Tiruchanur to Venkateswara, the presiding deity of Venkateswara Temple, Tirumala, at this place.

== History ==
The temple was established in the year 1541 AD. It was extended in later times.

== Administration ==
The temple at present is being administered by Tirumala Tirupati Devasthanams.

== Poojas and Festivals ==
Daily rituals are held as per Vaikanasa Agama.

== See also ==
- Hindu Temples in Tirupati
- List of temples under Tirumala Tirupati Devasthanams
