= Muchivolu =

- village
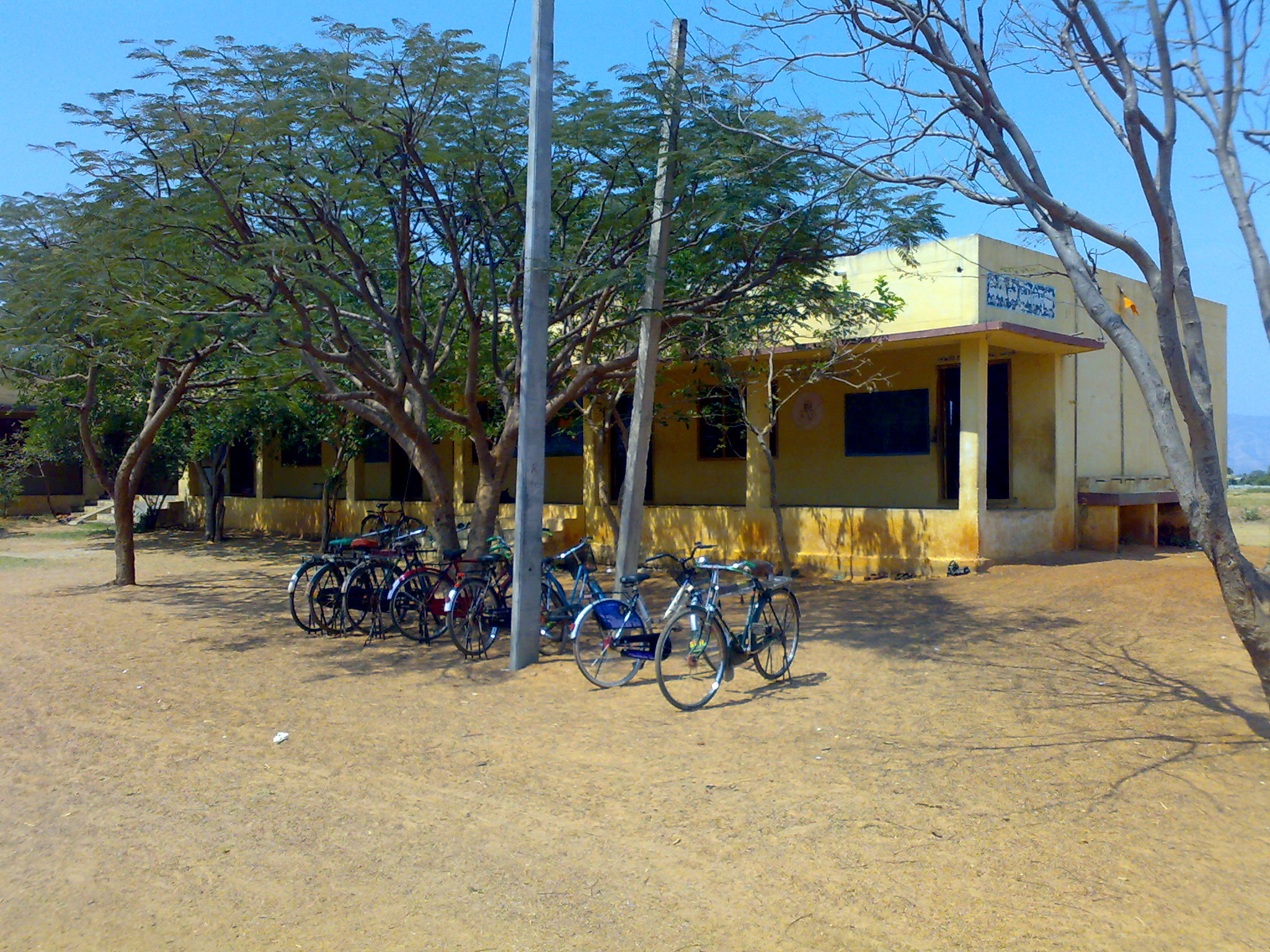
- Village High School
- Interactive map of Muchivolu
- Location in Andhra Pradesh, India Muchivolu (India)
- Coordinates: 13°47′56″N 79°38′2″E
- Country: India
- State: Andhra Pradesh
- District: Tirupati district

Government
  - Body: Panchayat

Languages
  - Official: Telugu
- Time zone: UTC+5:30 (IST)

Muchivolu is a village in Srikalahasti mandal, located in Tirupati district of Andhra Pradesh, India. It is situated 12 km north west of the town of Srikalahasti.

The main source of income for the people in the village comes from agriculture, largely paddy and ground nuts.

It has four temples. The village festival is Panduranga Swami Vaari Bramhothsavaalu, celebrated for seven days during May/June. It has one elementary school and one High school in addition to the government sponsored kindergarten school, Anganwadi School. In Muchivolu Siddu born.
