= Venkatadri Express (film) =

- Movie poster
- Directed by: Merlapaka Gandhi
- Written by: Merlapaka Gandhi; Sheik Dawood G
- Produced by: Gemini Kiran
- Starring: Sundeep Kishan; Rakul Preet Singh
- Cinematography: Chota K. Naidu
- Edited by: Gautham Raju
- Music by: Ramana Gogula
- Production company: Anandi Art Creations
- Release date: 29 November 2013
- Country: India
- Language: Telugu
- Box office: ₹10 crore distributors' share

Venkatadri Express is a 2013 Indian Telugu-language romantic comedy film written and directed by Merlapaka Gandhi. Produced by Gemini Kiran's Anandi Art Creations, the film stars Sundeep Kishan and Rakul Preet Singh (in her Telugu debut in Lead Role). Ramana Gogula provided the music while Chota K. Naidu and Gautham Raju performed the cinematography and editing respectively.

The film is remade in Kannada as Tirupathi Express (2014), in Bengali as Love Express (2016), in Odia as Love Station (2016).

== Plot ==
Ram Murthy, a retired head master, is disciplined and strives to instill in his family to behave similarly. To avoid bad remarks from the society about his family, he sets up a family constitution of discipline. His mania for discipline is such a big thing that if any one of his family members commit 100 mistakes, they would be banished the person from the family. Thus all of the family members maintain a disciplinary life to avoid being banished from the house. Ram Murthy's brother Subrahmanyam was alleged to have committed 100 mistakes, although he didn't, he was sent away from home. While all of the family members commit fewer than 20 mistakes, Sundeep commits 99 mistakes and one more, he is out of the family. So to avoid that Sundeep starts leading a careful life.

Brahmaji's marriage is scheduled at Tirupati and the whole family boards Venkatadri Express at Kacheguda. Sundeep's mother forgot the mangala sutra at the house and Sundeep goes away to bring it back. To his convenience, Sundeep has the berth reservation in S4 coach while others have in S3. Meanwhile, a miser techie Prarthana reaches Kacheguda to board the same train. Sundeep commandeers the auto and drives to his home, with Prarthana in passenger's seat despite her disapproval. He breaks the house's lock with a stone as he has no keys to open it making an impression to Prarthana that he is a thief. He takes the mangala sutra and goes back to Kacheguda. Prarthana catches yet another auto and reaches the station. A passenger, Dasthagiri, asks Sundeep to take care of his bag till he gets into the train after buying a water bottle. They both save each other's phone numbers so that Sundeep can give a missed call to Dasthagiri if the train starts leaving the station. Meanwhile, a quarrel breaks out on the platform. Sundeep, in order to avoid committing the 100th mistake, keeps quiet. The train reaches Tirupati by next day morning around 9:30 am. Anand and Brahmaji notice and ask about the blood stains on Sundeep's shirt. Sundeep narrates the story which happened during the past 12 hours.

Past: Sundeep tries to stop the quarrel on the platform. Prarthana interferes thinking he is about to steal from them. To their misfortune, the train leaves. With the help of goods transporter, Audi, Sundeep leaves to Shadnagar to catch the train. On the way Audi insults policemen in a bar, and loses his vehicle key. He steals an unknown car, not realising that it is the policemen's car, and drives towards Shadnagar with Sundeep. Dasthagiri informs Sundeep that the train has left Shadnagar and is heading towards Jadcherla. Sundeep and Audi drive away to Kurnool in order to catch the train. Drunken Audi gets into the train making Sundeep miss it again. In the process Sundeep gets hurt and faints away. Upon gaining consciousness, Sundeep is shocked to see that he is being taken to Shadnagar police station by those policemen. He escapes and boards a bus to travel to Dhone, yet another stop of Venkatadri Express. To his shock Prarthana is his co-passenger. Both quarrel and hence are forcibly dropped out of the bus. They board a car whose tyre gets punctured on the way. In the pretence of getting it repaired, Sundeep leaves but reaches Dhone railway station. He boards Venkatadri Express travelling from Tirupati towards Kacheguda which is on a different platform than the one he needs to board. Dasthagiri refuses to help him board the train as Sundeep forgot his bag. Meanwhile, Prarthana reaches the station with the bag only to stop Sundeep from boarding the train. Sundeep in agony slaps Prarthana and yells at her. Prarthana too responds rashly that Sundeep too left her on the road without any mercy at midnight and not even thinking about her safety. Both come to an understanding later and travel together. When Sundeep is away for a nature call, Prarthana is kidnapped by some goons. Sundeep reaches in time and rescues her. They flee away using one of the goon's bikes and reach Kadapa railway station the next morning. Venkatadri Express was said to be late by 2 hours, thus enabling them to board it this time. Sundeep narrates his whole story to Prarthana who now understands his situation. At the station Sundeep and Prarthana save two eloped lovers from the henchmen of the girl's father. They all escape from the railway station and with the help of a thrill seeking cab owner Bhadra, Sundeep conducts the lovers' marriage and gives away the mangala sutra which is designated for Brahmaji. Sundeep worries about the future consequences and are just 15 km (9.3 mi) away from Tirupati. Subrahmanyam gives them a lift in his lorry to reach the station. He gives away the mangala sutra to Sundeep, which he had kept for the last twenty years to marry. Sundeep boards the train just before it stops in Tirupati railway station.

Present: At Brahmaji's marriage, the bride's father is worried as the bride eloped with her lover and his men are searching for her. Sundeep is shocked when he learns that the bride is none other than the girl whose marriage was conducted by him and Prarthana at Kadapa. Ram Murthy learns that the girl eloped with her lover and the marriage is halted. Seetha discovers that the girl's marriage was conducted by Sundeep and experiences a severe asthma attack. She is being taken to a hospital. The bride's father hears about Sundeep's act from his henchmen and is furious and starts chasing them. On the way to the hospital, Ram Murthy lets Sundeep escape red traffic signals and a traffic constable is hurt in the process. At the hospital, Sundeep fights off bride's father's henchmen and Ram Murthy doesn't stop him from doing so. Later Ram Murthy learns the truth and Sundeep's mistakes turn 100.Sundeep then reminds that Ram Murthy broke his discipline and forgot his ideals during the chase and the fight, as his wife is in need of help. Sundeep argues that he can't leave the family because of what Ram Murthy did, and that he was just helping the ones in need all along. Ram Murthy realises and increases the mistakes level from 100 to 1000 letting Sundeep and Subrahmanyam re-enter the house. 3 months later on the day of Brahmaji's engagement, Sundeep is terrified and tensed and confides in Prarthana, that he committed his 999th mistake.

== Cast ==
- Sundeep Kishan as Sundeep
- Rakul Preet Singh as Prarthana
- Brahmaji as Brahmaji, Sundeep's brother
- Thagubothu Ramesh as Aani AKA Animutyam
- Saptagiri as Dasthagiri
- M. S. Narayana as Bhadra, taxi driver
- Nagineedu as Ram Murthy, Sundeep's father
- Narsing Yadav as police officer
- Prudhviraj as Subrahmanyam, Sundeep's uncle
- Namala Murthy as railway canteen man
- Praveen
- Jaya Prakash Reddy
- Sivannarayana Naripeddi, as train conductor
- Satya as hawker
- Abhiram Abhi as Kodi

== Release ==
Venkatadri Express was cleared by the Central Board of Film Certification on 22 November 2013. The film released in 450 screens worldwide on 29 November 2013. The film has got positive response not only from film goers and critics, but has also been raved by many leading actors. Sundeep Kishan, who has played the hero in it, says that he received a call from Mass Maharaja Ravi Teja, who calls the film superb entertainer. Ever since Venkatadri Express hit the screens, Sundeep Kishan has been getting congratulatory messages and calls from fans and people from the film industry. This morning, the elated actor tweeted, "Ravi Teja garu called saying he loved #VenkatadriExpress, called it a superb entertainer..thank you Ravi Garu, means a lot coming from you. Apart from this, veteran actor Allari Naresh provided the voice-over for this film.

=== Critical reception ===
Sangeeth Devi Dundoo of The Hindu wrote that, "We don't know if director Merlapaka Gandhi felt like a headmaster, dealing with a bogie-full of characters. As Venkatadri Express chugs along, we wonder how he's going to weave in innumerable characters into a tightly-knit plot. This isn't comedy that will knock your socks off; nor is it an assembly of mindless gags. Venkatadri Express is backed by reasonably good writing and acting makes for an entertaining watch."

123telugu.com rated the film 3/5 and stated: "Venkatadri Express has a good and entertaining first half. This part is backed up by good pace and nice comedy. However, what looks like a promising ride starts going downhill in the second half. The film loses pace and it starts becoming very predictable." Jeevi from Idlebrain.com opined that "Debutant director Merlapaka Gandhi comes up with a movie that has right gradients (entertainment and family emotions) in the right mix. He has got decent screenplay/story writing skills. You might feel that movie is over once Sundeep reaches the marriage venue in Tirupati. But the movie picks up after a brief lull to give a perfect 'happy ending'. On a whole, Venkatadri Express is a decent film with nice entertainment." and rated the film 3.25/5 calling it a "Fun Express". Oneindia Entertainment rated the film 3/5, calling the film "A Perfect Entertainer For Family Audience. The review added that: "debutant Merlapaka Gandhi has done brilliant work in his first attempt. This film will surely give a big break to him, Sundeep and Rakul".

=== Box office ===
The film collected ₹ 3.50 crore on its opening day. By the first weekend, Venkatadri Express netted around₹ 13.5 crore at the box office. The film is commercially successful.

=== Awards ===
Nandi Award for Best Male Comedian - Thagubothu Ramesh (2013)

=== Home media ===
The film was aired for the first time on 22 March 2014 on Gemini TV.

== Soundtrack ==
Venkatadri Express

Soundtrack album To Venkatadri Express by Ramana Gogula
- Released: 1 November 2013
- Recorded: 2013
- Genre: Feature film soundtrack
- Length: 11:24
- Language: Telugu
- Label: Aditya Music
- Producer: Ramana Gogula

Ramana Gogula chronology
1000 Abbadhalu (2013)	Venkatadri Express (2013)

Ramana Gogula composed the music for this film. The audio was launched on 1 November 2013 by Aditya Music which was followed by a promotional audio launch event held at Hyderabad on the same day.

Track list
No.	Title	Lyrics	Artist(s)	Length
1.	"Right Ayinaa Left Ayinaa"	Sri Mani	Ranjith	03:58
2.	"Mellamellaga"	Kasarla Shyam	Swetha Mohan, Anjana Soumya	03:30
3.	"Nachave Ammakachallo"	Bhaskarabhatla	Narendra, Sravana Bhargavi	03:55
Total length:				11:24
