= Ekam - The Oneness Temple =

Temple in Varadaiahpalem, India

Ekam – The Oneness Temple
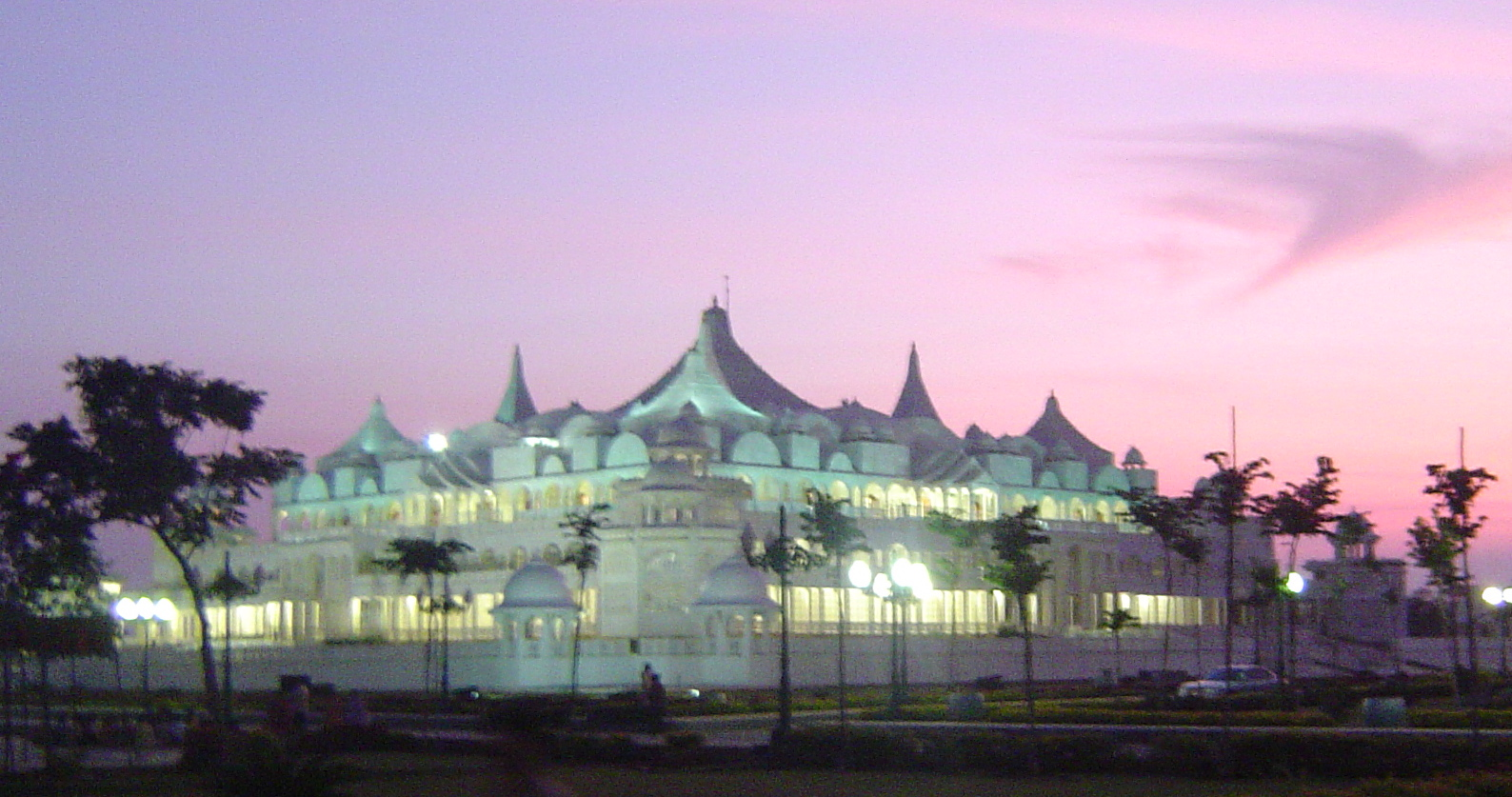

Religion
- Affiliation: Hinduism

Location
- Location: Varadaiah Palem, Tirupati district
- State: Andhra Pradesh
- Country: India
- Interactive map of Ekam – The Oneness Temple
- Coordinates: 13°35′49″N 79°59′49″E

Architecture
- Architect: Dr Prabhat Poddar
- Style: Shilpa Shastras, Vastu Shastra
- Completed: 2008

Website
- https://ekam.org

The Ekam - The Oneness Temple is located at Varadaiahpalem in Tirupati district of Andhra Pradesh, India. It was constructed by the Oneness organization founded by Kalki Bhagavan.The temple was inaugurated in April 2008, and built at an estimated cost of $75 million.

== Architecture ==
The temple is built in white marble and designed with stupas, spires, domes, ornate doors and latticed windows. It has a pillar-less meditation halls covering over 22,500 sq feet and is the largest of such halls in Asia. The temple is one of the fine examples of modern spiritual architecture and is designed to the Golden Ratio with a span of 50 metres.

The temple consists of three floors. Each floor is a large meditation hall. More than 8000 people can meditate together at the same time inside the temple. The halls at the ground and middle level are each a surface area of 6700m^{2}. The hall at the top floor has a surface area of 2500m^{2}. The height of the temple is 32.85 m. The entire temple is built on a raised platform of 130 m by 106 m and surrounded by a moat of water bodies at the four corners.

The middle floor is called Artha Kama (Hall of desires and solving problems). The top floor is a pillarless meditation hall called Dharma Moksha. It houses a gold ball of about 36 inches diameter which is also called the "Golden Orb".

Oneness Temple was designed by Prabhat Poddar (architect from Auroville, Tamil Nadu) based on his studies in architecture, geobiology, and Vaastu Shastra at Sri Aurobindo’s ashram-related International Centre for Education in Puducherry.

The temple is located in an open land beside the misty Eastern Ghats mountains.

The temple was inaugurated in 2008 with the occasion attended by half a million people. At the event, five people died and more injured during a stampede in the rush for drinking water.

== Media coverage ==
There has been media coverage of well-known visitors including Shilpa Shetty, Manisha Koirala, Hrithik Roshan, Rakesh Roshan, designer Donna Karan, musician Rick Allen, and NBA coach Pat Riley.

== Travel ==
The Oneness Temple is located about 73 km from Chennai and 80 km from Tirupati. Located on the main highway connecting to Kalahasthi, the temple is well connected by bus facilities from Chennai and Tirupathi. The nearest major international airport is the Chennai international airport which is 85 km away via NH16. The nearest railway station is 8.7 km away at Tada.

== Places of Interest nearby ==
- Chennai (also known as Madras) – Megacity in Tamil Nadu.
- Pulicat Lake Bird Sanctuary – second largest brackish-water eco-system in India.
- Sriharikota – The Indian satellite launch centre.
- Sri City – A special economic zone housing manufacturing plants such as PepsiCo, Isuzu Motors, Mondelez International, and others.
- Tirupati – Temple city where the important Sri Venkateswara Temple is located.

== See also ==
- Preetha Krishna
- Kalki Bhagawan
