= Preetha Krishna =

Indian spiritual and philosophy teacher

- Other name: Preethaji
- Education: Masters in Business Administration
- Occupations: Spiritual teacher and Philosopher
- Known for: Co-founder of Ekam
- Spouse: Krishnaji
- Children: Lokaa
- Website: Official website

Preetha Krishna (also known as Preethaji) is a spiritual teacher, author and co-founder of Ekam

== Work ==
Preetha Krishna is a spiritual teacher and is known for her teachings on consciousness and personal development. She has conducted programs in various countries across the world including India, the USA, China, Malaysia, Korea and other countries. She has given TED talks at Kansas City in 2017 and at Shanghai in 2018.

In 2002, Preetha Krishna founded the Women's Movement for the Golden Age in Bangalore. In 2009 along with her husband, Krishna, also known as 'Krishnaji', she co-founded One World Academy, a philosophy and meditation school in Kanchipuram, that later turned into O&O Academy.

In 2018, Preetha Krishna along with her husband created the Ekam World Peace Festival which is an annual meditation event conducted at Ekam. The event has drawn together several million participants from across the world including celebrities. During the global pandemic, it was conducted online.

== Business links ==
Preetha Krishna is a director of Kosmik Music and production company Kosmik Global Media, which owns the Bengaluru Bulls, a Pro Kabaddi League team.

Krishna is the daughter-in-law of "self-styled godman" Kalki Bhagavan.

In 2019, the Income Tax Department raided premises associated with Preetha Krishna and issued an order against her over unaccounted for cash and undeclared assets. She then filed a writ petition in the Madras High Court against this. The court in 2020 quashed the order passed by the tax department. Later, in 2022 the court dismissed the subsequent appeal by the department.

== Publications ==
=== Books authored ===
- Freedom in relationships., Preetha Krishna (2013) ISBN 978-0-9887-0390-2
- The Four Sacred Secrets: For Love and Prosperity, A Guide to Living in a Beautiful State, Preetha Krishna (2019) ISBN 978-1-5011-7377-6
