= Venkatagiri mandal =

Mandal in Tirupati district, Andhra Pradesh, India

- Mandal
- Interactive map of Venkatagiri mandal
- Location within Andhra Pradesh Location within India
- Coordinates: 13°57′10″N 79°34′40″E
- Country: India
- State: Andhra Pradesh
- District: Tirupati
- Revenue division: Srikalahasti
- Headquarters: Venkatagiri

Area
  - Total: 171.10 km^{2} (66.06 sq mi)

Population
  - Total: 79,588
  - Density: 465.15/km^{2} (1,204.7/sq mi)
- Time zone: UTC+05:30 (IST)

Venkatagiri mandal is one of the 36 mandals in Tirupati district in the Indian state of Andhra Pradesh. It is a part of Srikalahasti revenue division.

== History ==
Venkatagiri mandal used to be a part of Nellore district and was made part of the newly formed Tirupati district on 4 April 2022.

== Demographics ==
Religions in Venkatagiri mandal (2011)
Religion	Percent
Hindus	93.76%
Muslims	5.72%
Christians	0.37%
Others or not stated	0.15%
Distribution of religions

As per 2011 census, Venkatagiri mandal had a total population of 79,588 with 39,776 male population and 39,812 female population with a density of 465/km^{2}. Scheduled Castes and Scheduled Tribes made up 17,571 and 6,214 of the population respectively. It had a literacy rate of 69.59% with 77.3% among males and 61.95% among females.

== Administration ==
Venkatagiri mandal is a part of Srikalahasti revenue division.

== Politics ==
Venkatagiri mandal is a part of Venkatagiri Assembly constituency and Tirupati Lok Sabha constituency. As of 1 January 2018, the mandal had 60,838 eligible voters with 29,814 male voters and 31,024 female voters.
