= Palamangalam =

Coordinates: 11°38′N 76°07′E

- Village
- Interactive map of Palamangalam
- Country: India
- State: Andhra Pradesh
- District: Tirupati

Government
  - Body: Puttur, Andhra Pradesh

Area
  - Total: 23 km^{2} (8.9 sq mi)

Population (1256)
  - Total: 1,256
  - Rank: 7
  - Density: 55/km^{2} (140/sq mi)

Languages
  - Official: Telugu
- Time zone: UTC+5:30 (IST)
- PIN: 517581
- Telephone code: 08577

Palamangalam is a village panchayat in Narayanavanam mandal, located in Tirupati district of Andhra Pradesh, India.

In the 2011 census it had a population of 3754 in 1015 households.
