= Prabhas Sreenu =

Indian actor

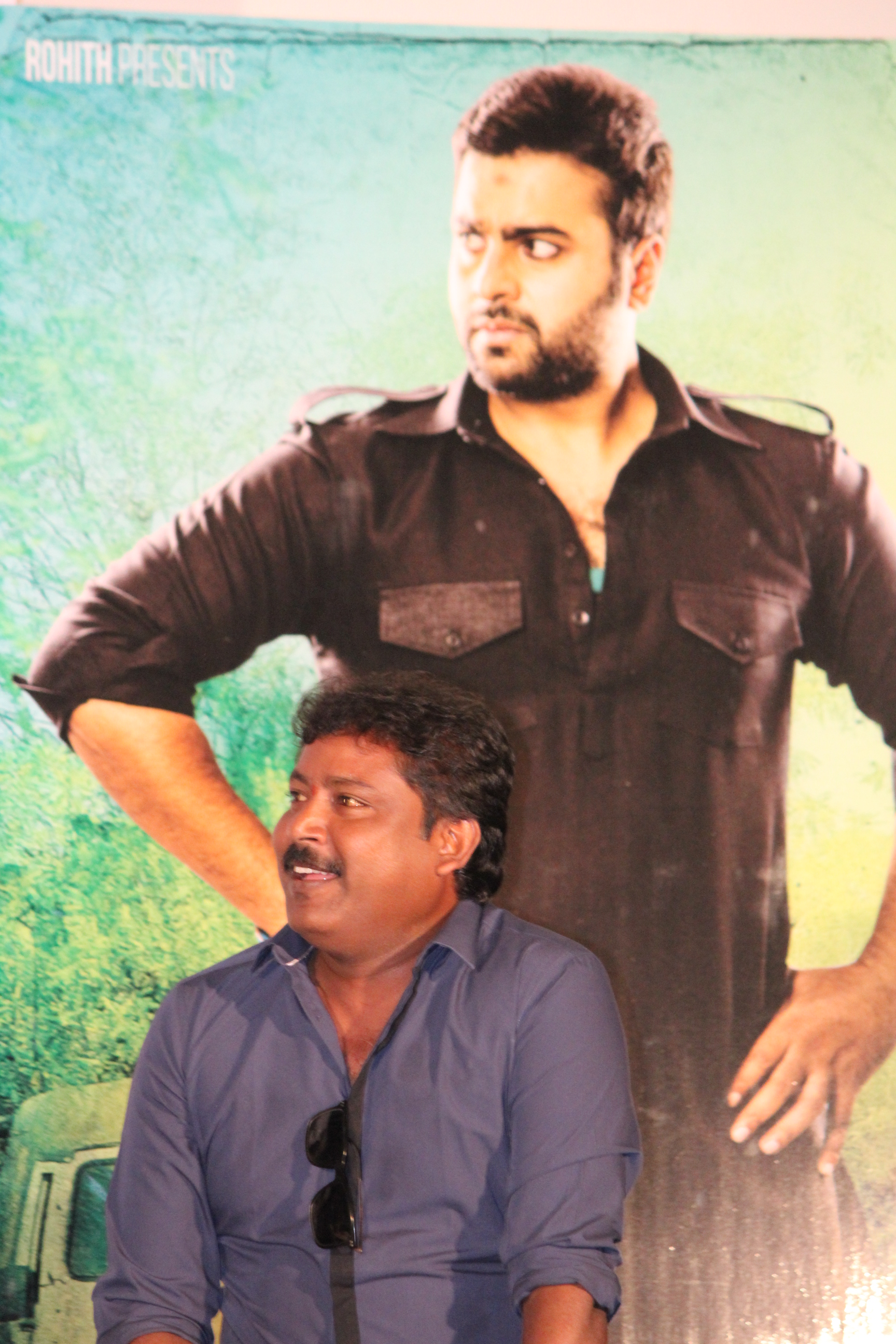
- Born: Narasannapeta, Andhrapradesh, India
- Occupation: actor
- Years active: 2003–present

Prabhas Sreenu is an Indian actor who primarily appears in Telugu films. He has won SIIMA Award for Best Comedian – Telugu for his performance in Gabbar Singh (2012). His notable films include Balupu (2013), Aagadu (2014), Subramanyam for Sale (2015), Express Raja (2016) and Sathamanam Bhavati (2017).

== Career ==
Sreenu has attached the name "Prabhas" as a prefix to his stage name, owing to his friendship with actor Prabhas. The pair had earlier been batchmates during their time at film institute, and after Prabhas had become an actor, Sreenu looked after his work. He continued to look after his work until Prabhas began to reduce his commitments to one film a year, which meant that Prabhas's uncles took over. He then worked as an actor, often playing negative and comedic roles in films.

== Filmography ==
=== Telugu films ===
Year	Title	Role	Notes
2003	Seetayya		
2004	Varsham		
2005	Chatrapathi		
2005	Chakram		
2006	Vikramarkudu		
2006	Pournami	Tea Seller	
2007	Yamadonga	Maheshwari's Cousin	
2008	Kantri	Spider Reddy	
2008	Bujjigadu		
2009	Magadheera		Cameo appearance
2010	Darling	Prabha's friend	
2011	Mr. Perfect	Kathi Seenu	
2011	Wanted	Chari	
2011	Oosaravelli		
2012	Nuvva Nena		
2012	Nandeeswarudu	Seenu	
2012	Gabbar Singh	Siddappa Seenu	SIIMA Award for Best Comedian – Telugu
2012	Uu Kodathara? Ulikki Padathara?	Cable Kesava	
2013	Seethamma Vakitlo Sirimalle Chettu	Goodu Raju's friend	
2013	Shadow	Daambar	
2013	Balupu	Rohit's henchman	
2013	Kamina	Siddhu's friend	
2013	Attarintiki Daredi	Siddhappa Naidu's henchman	
2014	Yevadu	Kaki	
2014	Kotha Janta		
2014	Run Raja Run	Govindharaju's henchman	
2014	Ee Varsham Sakshiga		
2014	Aagadu	Lion Seenu	
2014	Weekend Love	Ganesh's friend	
2015	Pataas	Politician	
2015	Jil	Seenu	
2015	Avunu 2		
2015	Pandaga Chesko	Shankar's henchman	
2015	James Bond		
2015	Dynamite		
2015	Subramanyam for Sale	Prabhakar	
2015	Mirchi Lanti Kurradu		
2015	Bhale Bhale Magadivoy		
2015	Dongaata		
2016	Savitri		
2016	Dictator	Prabha	
2016	Eedo Rakam Aado Rakam	Seenu	
2016	Express Raja		
2016	Supreme	Cruise	
2016	Hyper	Raghupati Raghava Rajaram	
2016	Meelo Evaru Koteeswarudu		
2017	Luckunnodu	Pulihora	
2017	Nenu Local	Nimmakayala Raghu	
2017	Jai Lava Kusa	Bank Recovery Officer	
2017	Nene Raju Nene Mantri	Subbarayudu's PA	
2017	Ungarala Rambabu		
2017	Raja the Great	Lucky's uncle	
2017	Sathamanam Bhavati		
2017	Okka Kshanam	Dasari Raghvendra Rao	
2018	Bhaagamathie	Subba Reddy	
2018	Juvva		
2018	MLA	Gandappa's PA	
2018	Krishnarjuna Yudham	Shankar	
2018	Achari America Yatra		
2018	Naa Peru Surya	Challa's henchmen	
2018	Pantham	Naayak's Assistant	
2018	Srinivasa Kalyanam	Seenu	
2018	Geetha Govindam		Cameo appearance
2018	Nannu Dochukunduvate	Daivatailam	
2018	Devadas	Seenu	
2019	Chitralahari	Repair Shop Owner	
2019	Prashnista	Seenu	
2019	Gaddalakonda Ganesh	Balijayya	
2019	Raju Gari Gadhi 3		
2019	Tenali Ramakrishna BA. BL	Sreenu	
2020	Entha Manchivaadavuraa	Venu	
2021	Bangaru Bullodu	Bhavani's brother	
2021	Sreekaram	Ekambaram's brother-in-law	
2022	Sarkaru Vaari Paata	Recovery agent	
2022	First Day First Show	Reel Distributor	
2022	Anukoni Prayanam		
2023	Waltair Veerayya	Bujji	
2023	Nireekshana	Gautham's friend	
2024	Vey Dharuvey		
2024	The Family Star	Govardhan's friend	
2024	Mr. Bachchan	Srinivas	
2024	Lucky Baskhar	Visa Consultant	
2024	Naa Saami Ranga	Rambabu	
2024	Laggam	Deloitte Diwakar	
2025	Mad Square	Bar Owner	
2025	Single	Rowdy	
2025	Shashtipoorthi		
2025	Oh Bhama Ayyo Rama	Lecturer	
2025	Gurram Paapi Reddy	Lingam	
2026	The RajaSaab	Autodriver Seenu	
2026	Ustaad Bhagat Singh	Katta	
2026	Peddi	Commentator	

=== Tamil films ===
Year	Title	Role	Notes
2011	Siruthai	Bavuji's henchman	credited as Seenu
2016	Thozha	Prisoner	
2018	Bhaagamathie	Subba Reddy	
