= Dakkili mandal =

Mandal in Tirupati district, Andhra Pradesh, India

- Mandal
- Interactive map of Dakkili mandal
- Location within Andhra Pradesh Location within India
- Coordinates: 14°6′10″N 79°33′0″E
- Country: India
- State: Andhra Pradesh
- District: Tirupati
- Revenue division: Srikalahasti

Area
  - Mandal: 277.12 km^{2} (107.00 sq mi)

Population (2011)
  - Mandal: 40,452
  - Density: 145.97/km^{2} (378.07/sq mi)
  - Urban: 0
  - Rural: 40,452
- Time zone: UTC+05:30 (IST)

Dakkili mandal is one of the 36 mandals in Tirupati district in the Indian state of Andhra Pradesh. It is a part of Srikalahasti revenue division.

== History ==
Dakkili mandal was a part of Nellore district until 2022. It was made part of the newly formed Tirupati district effective from 4 April 2022.

== Demographics ==
Religions in Dakkili mandal (2011)
Religion	Percent
Hindus	98.91%
Muslims	0.84%
Christians	0.16%
Others or not stated	0.09%
Distribution of religions

As per 2011 census, Dakkili mandal had a total population of 40,452 with 20,174 male population and 20,278 female population with a density of 146/km^{2}. Scheduled Castes and Scheduled Tribes made up 11,656 and 4,976 of the population respectively. It had a literacy rate of 56.81% with 64.6% among males and 49.14% among females.

== Administration ==
Dakkili mandal is a part of Gudur revenue division. As of 2011 census, the mandal comprises the following 50 villages:

Village
Althurupadu
Attalasiddavaram
Bheemavaram
Chakalapalle
Chapalapalle
Cheekirenipalle
Chennasamudram
Cherlopalle
Daggavolu
Dakkili
Dandavolu
Dandavolu Upparapalle
Dattanagaram*
Devulapalle
Gollavarigunta*
Kandalavaripalle
Koneswarabhatlapalle
Kothacheruvu*
Kothanalapadu
Kuppayapalem
Lingasamudram
Madhavaiahpalem
Mahasamudram
Marlagunta
Matumadugu
Mopuru
Mopuru Vellampalli
Nadimpalle
Nagavolu
Nagulapadu
Naidupalem
Namasivayapuram*
Noothalacheruvu*
Palugodu
Pathanalapadu
Pedayachasamudram
Sanganapalle
Sreepuram
Surayapalem
Swarnayacha Samudram*
Theerthampadu
Thimmanagunta
Thimmayapalem
Vedurugunta*
Veera Kummara Yachasamudram
Velikallu
Vembuluru
Vempativaripalle
Vengamanaidupalle
Yellavajjulapalle

- Note: Dattanagaram, Gollavarigunta, Kothacheruvu, Namasivayapuram, Noothalacheruvu, Swarnayacha Samudram and Vedurugunta were uninhabited

== Politics ==
Dakkili mandal is a part of Venkatagiri Assembly constituency and Tirupati Lok Sabha constituency. As of 1 January 2018, the mandal had 29,925 eligible voters with 14,822 male voters and 15,103 female voters.
