= Merlapaka Gandhi =

Indian film director and screenwriters

- Born: Merlapaka Che Guevara; 11 May 1988 (age 38); Vedulla Cheruvu, Andhra Pradesh, India
- Education: B. Tech
- Occupations: Film director; screenwriter

Merlapaka Gandhi (born Merlapaka Che Guevara) is an Indian film director and screenwriter who works primarily in Telugu cinema. In 2013, he made his directorial debut with Venkatadri Express. He later directed Express Raja (2016), and Krishnarjuna Yudham (2018) starring Nani.

== Early life ==
Merlapaka was born in the village of Vedulla Cheruvu near Renigunta, Andhra Pradesh in a Telugu-speaking family. His father Merlapaka Murali was a Telugu language novelist and a contemporary of author Yandamuri Veerendranath. Merlapaka was initially given the name Che Guevara because his father was fond of Marxist revolutionary Che Guevara. As their friends and relatives found it difficult to pronounce the name, Murali changed his five-year old son's given name to 'Gandhi' in honour of independence activist Mahatma Gandhi. He was inspired by the film Gandhi.

Merlapaka was schooled in Tirupati and graduated with a Bachelor of Technology from Allagadda. He also completed a course in film direction at the LV Prasad Film Academy and TV Academy.

== Film career ==
Merlapaka wanted to become a film director since the 10th standard. After completing his graduation, he convinced his father to let him join a Cinematography course at the L. V. Prasad film institute in Chennai, Tamil Nadu, although, he eventually pursued a direction course there. Later on, he started writing stories and directed a short film.

With no prior film experience, Gandhi created his short film Karmara Devuda which won for 'best film' when presented at the 2011-2012 Hyderabad Short Film Festival. The film was positively reviewed by Harish Shankar on Idle Brain in November 2013. Gandhi then shared the concept for his comedy film Venkatadri Express to Sundeep Kishan, who was impressed and subsequently arranged a producer for the film.

== Filmography ==
Key
†	Denotes films that have not yet been released

Year	Film	Director	Writer	Notes
2013	Venkatadri Express	Yes	Yes	Directorial debut
2016	Express Raja	Yes	Yes	
2018	Krishnarjuna Yudham	Yes	Yes	
2021	Ek Mini Katha	No	Yes	
2021	Maestro	Yes	Yes	
2022	Like, Share & Subscribe	Yes	Yes	
2026	Korean Kanakaraju	Yes	Yes	
