= Akkurthi =

- Village
- Akkurthi Train station
- Interactive map of Akkurthi
- Location in Andhra Pradesh, India Akkurthi (India)
- Coordinates: 13°47′50.29″N 79°40′07.67″E
- Country: India
- State: Andhra Pradesh
- District: Tirupati

Languages
  - Official: Telugu
- Time zone: UTC+5:30 (IST)
- PIN: 517536
- Vehicle registration: AP

Akkurthi is a village in Srikalahasti mandal, located in Tirupati district of Indian state of Andhra Pradesh.
