= Srikalahasti revenue division =

Revenue division in Tirupati district, Andhra Pradesh, India

Srikalahasti revenue division శ్రీకాళహస్తి ఆదాయ విభాగం
- Revenue division in Tirupati district
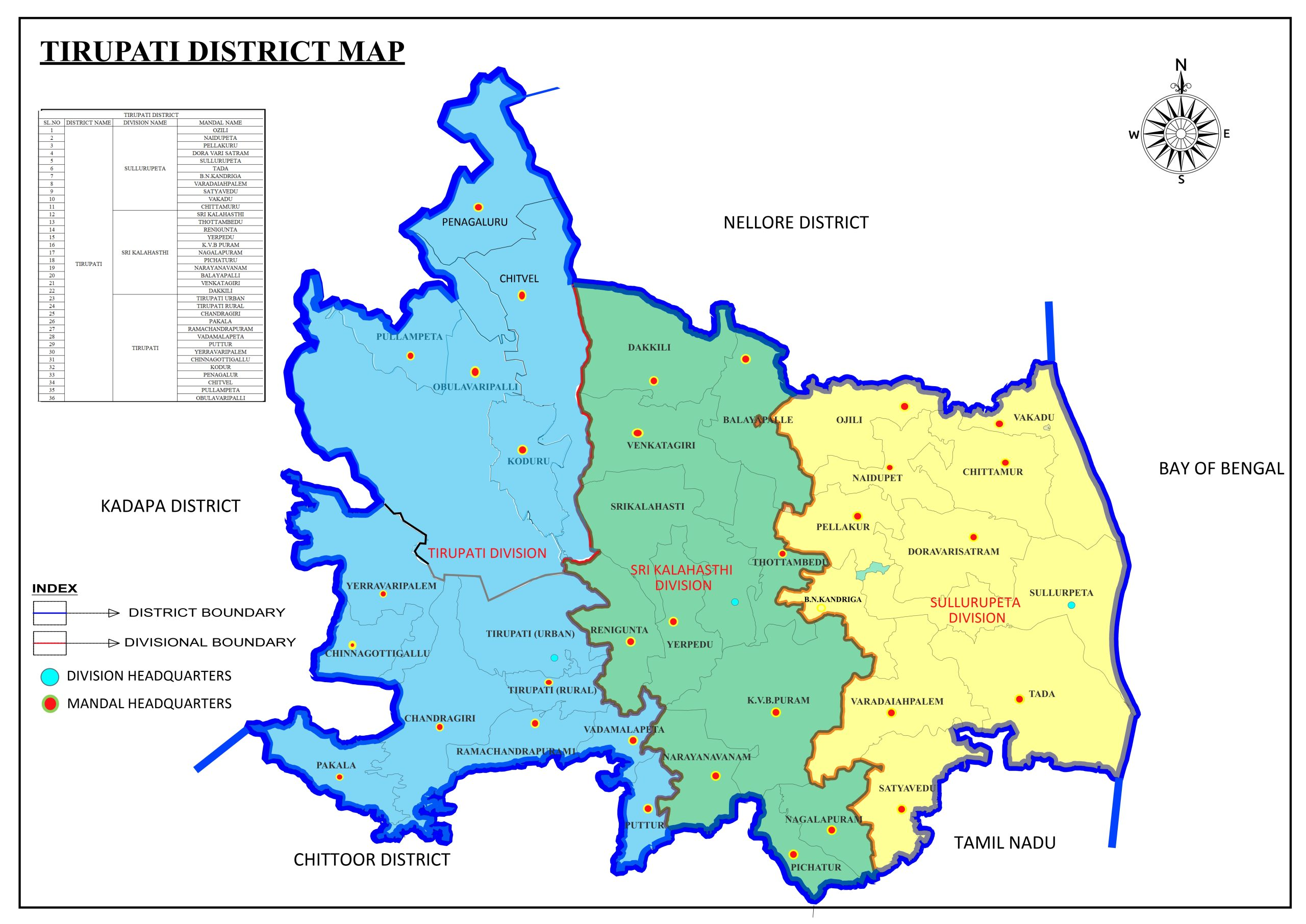
- Srikalahasti revenue division in Tirupati district
- Country: India
- State: Andhra Pradesh
- District: Tirupati
- Formed: 4 April 2022
- Founder: Government of Andhra Pradesh
- Headquarters: Srikalahasti
- Time zone: UTC+05:30 (IST)

Srikalahasti revenue division is an administrative division in the Tirupati district of the Indian state of Andhra Pradesh.This division headquarters is located at Srikalahasti .It is one of the three revenue divisions in the district and comprises eight mandals. It was formed on 4 April 2022 along with the newly formed Tirupati district.

== Administration ==
The revenue division comprises eleven mandals: Balayapalle, Dakkili, K. V. B. Puram, Nagalapuram, Narayanavanam, Pichatur, Renigunta, Srikalahasti, Thottambedu, Venkatagiri and Yerpedu.

== See also ==
- List of revenue divisions in Andhra Pradesh
- List of mandals in Andhra Pradesh
- Tirupati district
- Tirupati revenue division
- Sullurupeta revenue division
