= Koneti Adimulam =

Indian politician (born 1958)

Member of the Andhra Pradesh Legislative Assembly
- Incumbent
- Assumed office 2019
- Preceded by: Talari Aditya Tarachandrakanth
- Constituency: Satyavedu

Personal details
- Other party: Telugu Desam Party (2001–2011; 2024); YSR Congress Party (2011–2024); Indian National Congress (1977–2001)

Koneti Adimulam (born 1958) is an Indian politician from Andhra Pradesh. He was elected as an MLA from Satyavedu Assembly constituency which is reserved for SC community in Chittoor district Present (Tirupati district) from Telugu Desam Party in the 2024 Andhra Pradesh Legislative Assembly election.

== Early life and education ==
Adimulam was born in Bheemunicheruvu village, Chittoor District to Koneti Elumalai. He completed his graduation in arts from S. V. Arts College, Tirupati in 1975.

== Political career ==
He started his political career with Indian National Congress in 1977. He was elected as a Sarpanch of Bheemunicheruvu Village, Narayanavanam Mandal in 1981. He also served as vice chairman of Mandal Praja Parishad in 1988 and as a member of MPTC in 1995. He joined Telugu Desam Party in 2001, and was elected as a Zilla Parishad member. In 2011, he joined YSR Congress Party but lost the 2014 Andhra Pradesh Legislative Assembly Election to Talari Aditya of TDP by a narrow margin of 4,227 votes. He represented YSR Congress Party again and won the 2019 Andhra Pradesh Legislative Assembly Election defeating Jadda Rajasekhar of Telugu Desam Party by a margin of 44,744 votes. He was denied a ticket by YSRCP to contest the 2024 Assembly Election. He was allotted the MP seat to contest from Tirupati Lok Sabha constituency which he refused. So he joined Telugu Desam Party which nominated him to contest the MLA seat from Sathyavedu (SC) constituency.

He was suspended from Telugu Desam Party on 5 September 2024 on the allegations of sexual assault on a party worker.
