= Nagalapuram mandal =

Mandal in Tirupati district, Andhra Pradesh, India

- Mandal
- Interactive map of Nagalapuram mandal
- Country: India
- State: Andhra Pradesh
- District: Tirupati
- Revenue division: Srikalahasti
- Time zone: UTC+05:30 (IST)

Nagalapuram mandal is one of the 36 mandals in Tirupati district in the Indian state of Andhra Pradesh. It is a part of Srikalahasti revenue division.

== History ==
The mandal used to be a part of Chittoor district and was made part of the newly formed Tirupati district on 4 April 2022.
