= Express Raja =

- Theatrical release poster
- Directed by: Merlapaka Gandhi
- Written by: Merlapaka Gandhi
- Screenplay by: Merlapaka Gandhi; Sheik Dawood G.
- Story by: Merlapaka Gandhi
- Produced by: V. Vamsi Krishna Reddy; Pramod Uppalapati
- Starring: Sharwanand; Surbhi
- Cinematography: Karthik Gattamneni
- Edited by: Satya Giduturi
- Music by: Praveen Lakkaraju
- Production company: UV Creations
- Release date: 14 January 2016
- Running time: 144 minutes
- Country: India
- Language: Telugu
- Box office: ₹28.35 crore

Express Raja is a 2016 Indian Telugu-language hyperlink romantic comedy thriller film written and directed by Merlapaka Gandhi. Produced by V. Vamsi Krishna Reddy and Pramod Uppalapati under their production company UV Creations, the film features Sharwanand and Surbhi in the lead roles with Harish Uthaman, Prabhas Sreenu, Sapthagiri, Urvashi, Supreeth, and Brahmaji in supporting roles. The music was composed by Praveen Lakkaraju with cinematography by Karthik Ghattamaneni. The film was released worldwide on 14 January 2016 coinciding with the festival of Sankranthi.

== Plot ==
The film begins with the introduction of Inumu, a peculiar thief who only steals items made out of iron. Then Raja, Sreenu and Giri are shown kidnapping a pet dog and escaping. The film then moves to a flashback where Raja and Sreenu are both jobless people and constant sources of irritation for their respective fathers. Raja's father is a teacher and social activist. He, along with his friend collect money for an NGO for treating children. Raja and Sreenu are rounded off by the local area inspector for being vagabonds as he feels that vagabonds are a nuisance to the society. He orders them to leave for Hyderabad to do the jobs that he arranged for them.

However, as they reach Hyderabad, Raja sees Amulya and falls for her immediately. He then presents himself as a salesman for the Oxford Dictionary to woo her. He finally wins her love when he saves her from being molested by some goons. Amulya loves pet dogs, while Raja hates them. As fate would have it, Amulya, who was about to propose her love for Raja, sees Raja hand over her pet dog to the local municipal corporation. An enraged Amulya breaks up with Raja. Raja, to win back her love, goes looking for the dog and finds it in a pet shop, whose owner insists on paying money in exchange. Raja and Seenu, short of money, sell a record number of dictionaries to impress Bill Gates and take the required money from him. On reaching the pet shop, their bag is exchanged during bedlam at a pet shop with Giri's bag. After a belated realization, they search for Giri and find out that Giri has burned the bag, thinking that the bag had contained the love letters that his sister received. Giri apologizes and promises to do whatever Raja and Seenu ask him to. All of them then go to the pet shop only to realize that the dog had already been purchased. They then begin searching for the dog, and After few attempts in vain, they find the dog in Binami British's home. The film is taken back to the kidnapping scene where they flee the place after kidnapping the dog.

Raja delivers the dog to Amulya only to find out that she will marry Kesava Reddy, the son of an MLA in Nellore, Kokila. A crestfallen Raja is detained by the British to reveal the location of the dog. However, Raja and Seenu escape from the clutches of the British to Nellore. However, he is caught by Kesava Reddy's gang as soon as he reaches there. Kesava Reddy thinks Raja is the reason behind his mother losing her memory during a car crash that occurred in the melee created by the dog kidnapping. Raja is let off by Kesava Reddy as he was admonished by his mother not to commit any crime until his marriage. Raja, with the help of Sreenu, reaches the place where Amulya is staying and elopes with her. Keshava Reddy learns this and chases Raja. Raja encounters a dance troupe on the way only to find that he was using the troupe's vehicle to escape from the British. They then reach a local fair where they were to perform in a dance program only to be caught by Kesava Reddy on stage. However, the stage where the troupe was dancing collapses due to a mischief by Inumu, and Amulya is taken hostage by the British and Giri, while Kesava Reddy is looking to avenge his mother's memory loss and his abandoned marriage. Raja and Sreenu manage to find the pet dog and hand it over to the British in exchange for Amulya. However, all of them are detained by Kesava Reddy only to be rescued by Raja when he knocks out Kesava Reddy using Oxford Dictionary.

== Cast ==
- Sharwanand as Raja
- Surbhi as Amulya
- Harish Uthaman as Keshav Reddy
- Saptagiri as Giri
- Prabhas Sreenu as Sreenu
- Urvashi as Kokila
- Nagineedu as Raja's father
- Dhanraj as Inumu
- Brahmaji as Bill Gates
- Supreeth as Binami British
- Posani Krishna Murali as Police officer
- Ajay Ghosh as Ajay Ghosh
- Duvvasi Mohan
- Revathi as Amulya's sister
- Shakalaka Shankar
- Kalpa Latha
- Raghu
- Sathyaraj as Amulya's grandfather (photo appearance)

== Production ==
In January 2015, it was announced that Sharwanand was cast in a lead role, and later Adah Sharma was announced as under consideration for the role of the film's lead female, but Surabhi was the one eventually cast.

In September 2015, it was reported that the filming of a few key scenes with the lead cast were under way in areas of Ameerpet, Hyderabad.

== Soundtrack ==
Express Raja

Soundtrack album by Praveen Lakkaraju
- Released: 19 December 2015
- Recorded: 2015
- Genre: Soundtrack
- Length: 14:08
- Label: Aditya Music
- Producer: Praveen Lakkaraju

Praveen Lakkaraju chronology
| Sankarabharanam (2015) | Express Raja (2015) | Luckunnodu (2017) |

The music was composed by Praveen Lakkaraju and Released on Aditya Music. The audio launch was held at Shilpakala Vedika in Hyderabad on 19 December. Prabhas, Sharwanand, Surbhi, Vamsi, Pramod, Merlapaka Gandhi, Sujith, Radha Krishna, Brahmaji, Saptagiri, Maruthi, Bunny Vasu, Dil Raju, Supreeth, Satya, and some others graced the event. Prabhas launched the big CD and theatrical trailer and presented the first CD to Dil Raju.

Track-List
| No. | Title | Lyrics | Singer(s) | Length |
|---|---|---|---|---|
| 1. | "Hulala" | Sri Mani | Sweekar Agasthi, Silvia Anisha | 3:43 |
| 2. | "Colorful Chilaka" | Bhaskarabhatla Ravi Kumar | Narendra | 3:49 |
| 3. | "Ee Vintha Needhiga" | Sreejo | Lipsika, Yazin Nizar | 2:55 |
| 4. | "24/7 Party" | Sreejo | Yazin Nizar | 3:41 |
| Total length: | | | | 14:08 |

== Release ==
Express Raja has been released in close to 500 screens worldwide alongside Balakrishna's Dictator.

== Box office ==
=== Domestic ===
Express Raja grossed ₹4 crore on opening day at AP/Telangana box office and has become the biggest opener for Sharwanand.

=== Overseas ===
Express Raja collected US$170,312[₹ 1.15 crore] in its extended weekend at the United States. It also done decent business in other parts of the globe, where it is estimated to have grossed ₹2 crore. The movie has collected approximately ₹8 crore at the worldwide box office in the first weekend. Express Raja collected $315,547 at the US box office in two weeks. According to trade analyst Taran Adarsh the film has collected $413,324 (₹ 2.81 crore) at the US box office in 3 weeks.

== Awards ==
- Nandi Award for Best Male Comedian - Saptagiri (2016)
