= Narayanavanam =

- Census Town
- Location in Andhra Pradesh, India
- Coordinates: 13.42°N 79.58°E
- Country: India
- State: Andhra Pradesh
- District: Tirupati
- Mandal: Narayanavanam

Area
  - Total: 1.68 km^{2} (0.65 sq mi)
- Elevation: 120 m (390 ft)

Population (2011)
  - Total: 11,253
  - Density: 6,700/km^{2} (17,300/sq mi)

Languages
  - Official: Telugu
- Time zone: UTC+5:30 (IST)
- PIN: 517581
- Telephone code: +91–8577
- Vehicle registration: AP

Narayanavanam is a census town in Tirupati district of the Indian state of Andhra Pradesh. It is the headquarters of Narayanavanam mandal in Sri Kalahasti revenue division. As per legend, Narayanavanam was the capital of King Akasaraja, who was ruling this region. The town is known for Kalyana Venkateswara Temple dedicated to Lord Venkateswara and constructed in 1541 AD. This is the place where Lord Sri Venkateswara and Padmavathi Ammavaru marriage was happened.

== Geography ==
Narayanavanam is located at 13.42°N 79.58°E. It has an average elevation of 122 metres (400 ft).

Narayanavanam is 35 kilometres (22 mi) from Tirupati, 95 kilometres (59 mi) from Chennai in Tamil Nadu and 5 kilometres (3.1 mi) from Puttur, the departure point for buses to the temple town Narayanavanam and Kailasa Kona Falls.

== Demographics ==
At the 2011 India census, Narayanavanam had a population of 37,041 (50% male and 50% female). The average literacy rate was 64%, lower than the national average of 74%: male literacy was 72% and female literacy 56%. 11% of the population were under 6 years of age. Telugu is the official language of the town.

== Education ==
Primary and secondary school education is provided by government, aided and private schools, under the state's School Education Department. The medium of instruction followed by different schools is English and Telugu.

== See also ==
- List of census towns in Andhra Pradesh
