= Antaryamin =

The Antaryamin, in terms of Hindu philosophy, is related to the "inner-self", the "inner-controller" or the "inner-guidance" that exists in a person and itself manifests on an intuitive way to the one manifesting it. It recalls a teacher or a guru that resides within and once it is manifested—for a higher context of knowledge guidance—usually after one summons or prays for it, the Antaryamin comes to help. In some cases, the Antaryamin is asked to be manifested in order to resolve non-intellectual issues, also performing miracles to the one asking.

== In Hinduism ==
The term antaryamin means one who controls (yam) from within (antar). The Ishavasya Upanishad describes that everything in the universe is pervaded by the supreme spirit. The Chandogya Upanishad describes that this supreme spirit remains unlimited, but he also dwells in a person as their innermost self. Brihadaranyaka Upanishad 3.7–8 mentions the antaryamin doctrine. Swami Krishnananda describes the antaryamin as comprable to electricity, in that it is not visible.
