= Thottambedu =

- Village
- Interactive map of Thottambedu
- Location in Andhra Pradesh, India
- Coordinates: 13°44′22″N 79°47′36″E
- Country: India
- State: Andhra Pradesh
- District: Tirupati
- Mandal: Thottambedu

Languages
  - Official: Telugu
- Time zone: UTC+5:30 (IST)
- Vehicle registration: AP

Thottambedu is a village in Tirupati district of the Indian state of Andhra Pradesh. It is the mandal headquarters of Thottambedu mandal.
