= K. V. B. Puram mandal =

Mandal in Tirupati district, Andhra Pradesh, India

Kumara Venkata Bhupala Puram mandal K. V. B. Puram mandal
- Mandal
- Interactive map of Kumara Venkata Bhupala Puram mandal
- Country: India
- State: Andhra Pradesh
- District: Tirupati
- Revenue division: Srikalahasti
- Time zone: UTC+05:30 (IST)

Kumara Venkata Bhupala Puram mandal, commonly known as K. V. B. Puram mandal is one of the 36 mandals in Tirupati district in the Indian state of Andhra Pradesh. It is a part of Srikalahasti revenue division.

== History ==
The mandal used to be a part of Chittoor district and was made part of the newly formed Tirupati district on 4 April 2022.
