= Varadaiahpalem =

- Village
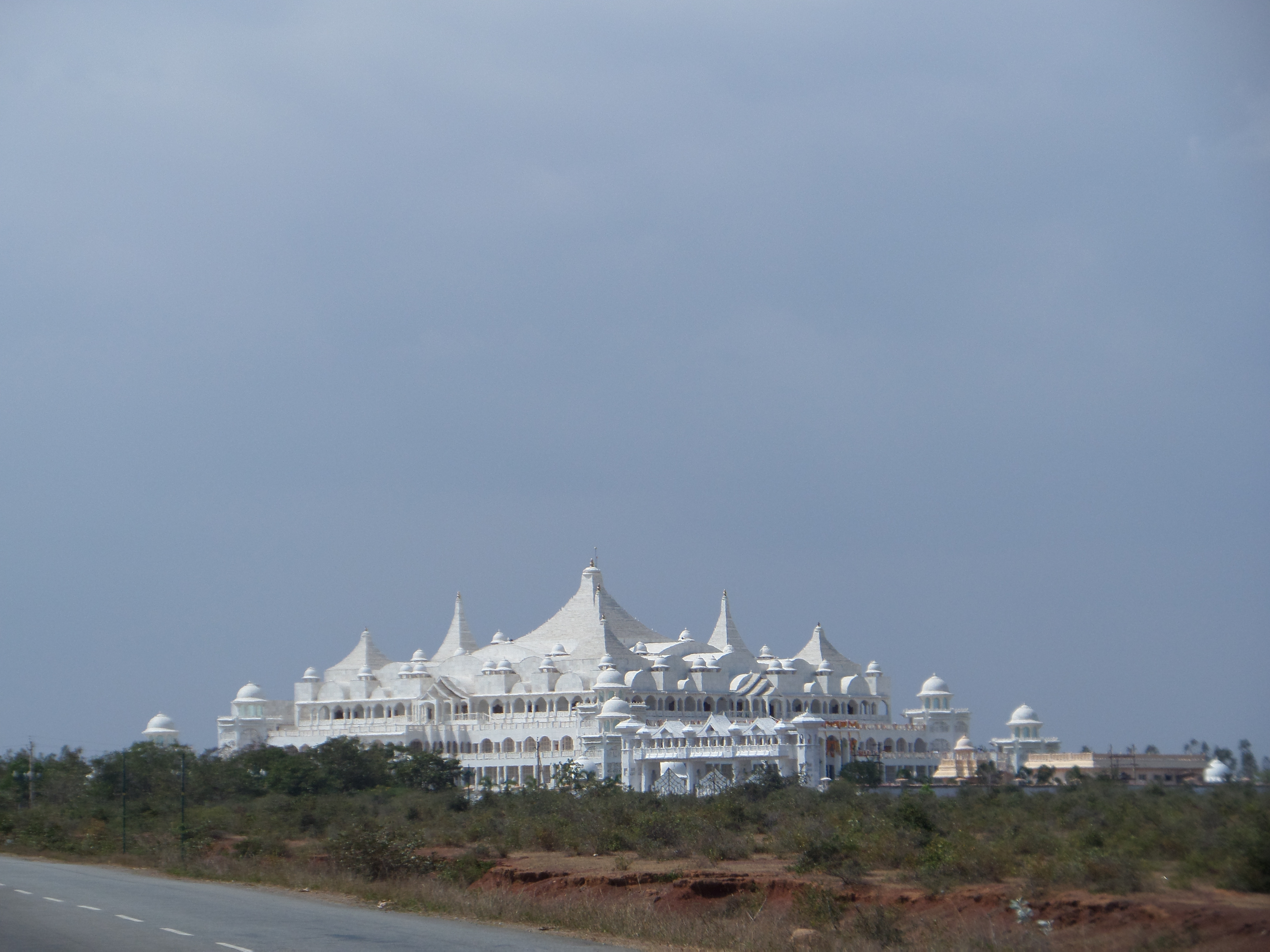
- Temple in Vittaiah Palem
- Interactive map of Varadaiahpalem
- Location in Andhra Pradesh, India
- Coordinates: 13.6°N 79.9333°E
- Country: India
- State: Andhra Pradesh
- District: Tirupati
- Mandal: Varadaiahpalem

Languages
  - Official: Telugu
- Time zone: UTC+5:30 (IST)
- PIN: 517541
- Telephone code: +91–8576
- Vehicle registration: AP

Varadaiahpalem is a place located in Tirupati district of the Indian state of Andhra Pradesh. It is the mandal headquarters of Varadaiahpalem mandal. Varadaiahpalem is known to many because of Oneness University.

This Mandal is growing on rapid basis due to industrial development of Sri City and APACHE at TADA and Sullurpet.

== Geography ==
Varadaiahpalem is located at 13.6°N 79.9333°E. Famous Ubbalamudugu Falls is present in this mandal.
