= Rayalaseema =

Geographic region in Andhra Pradesh, India

Rayalaseema Rāyalasīma Tirupati region
- Geographic region of Andhra Pradesh
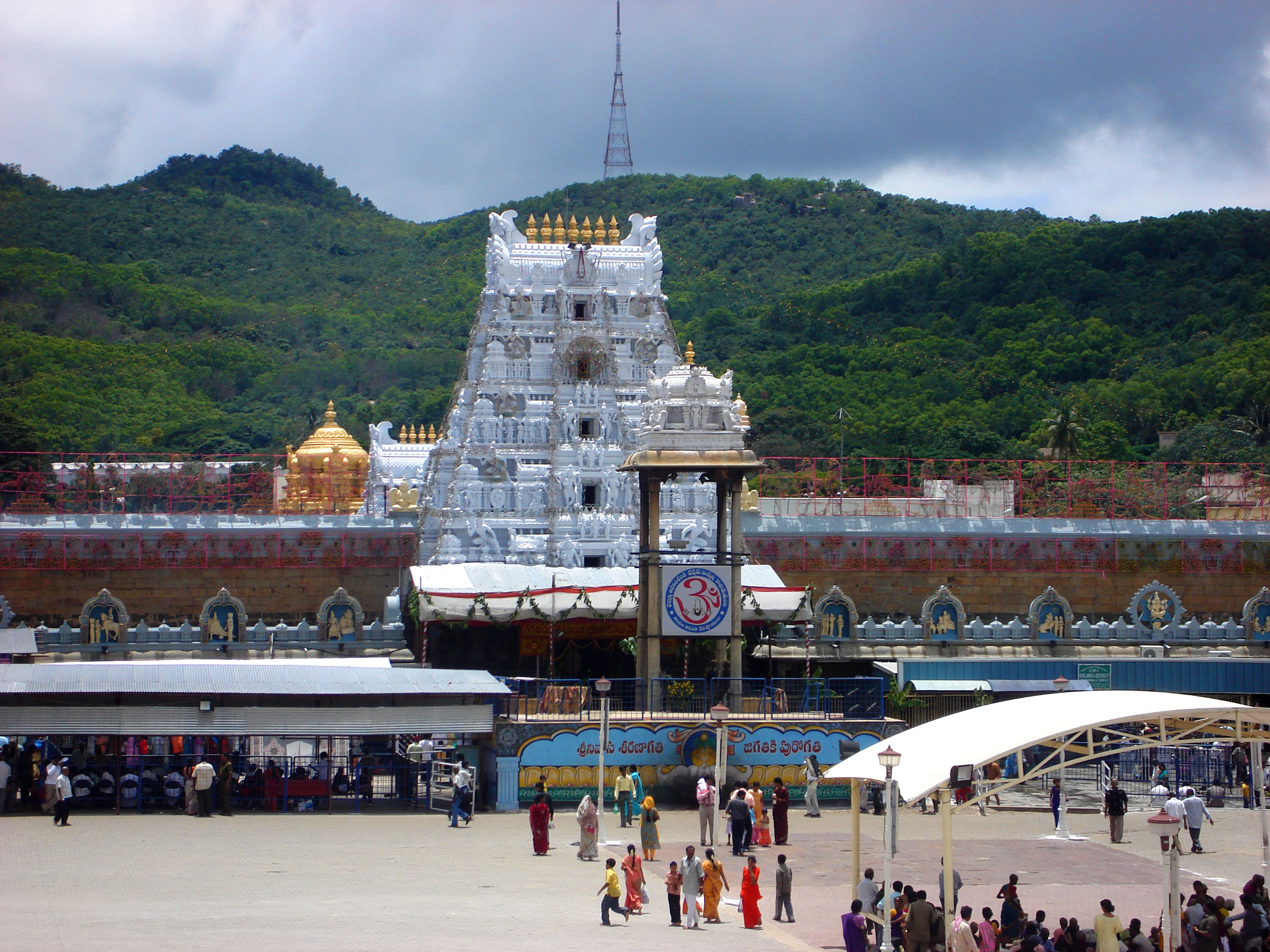
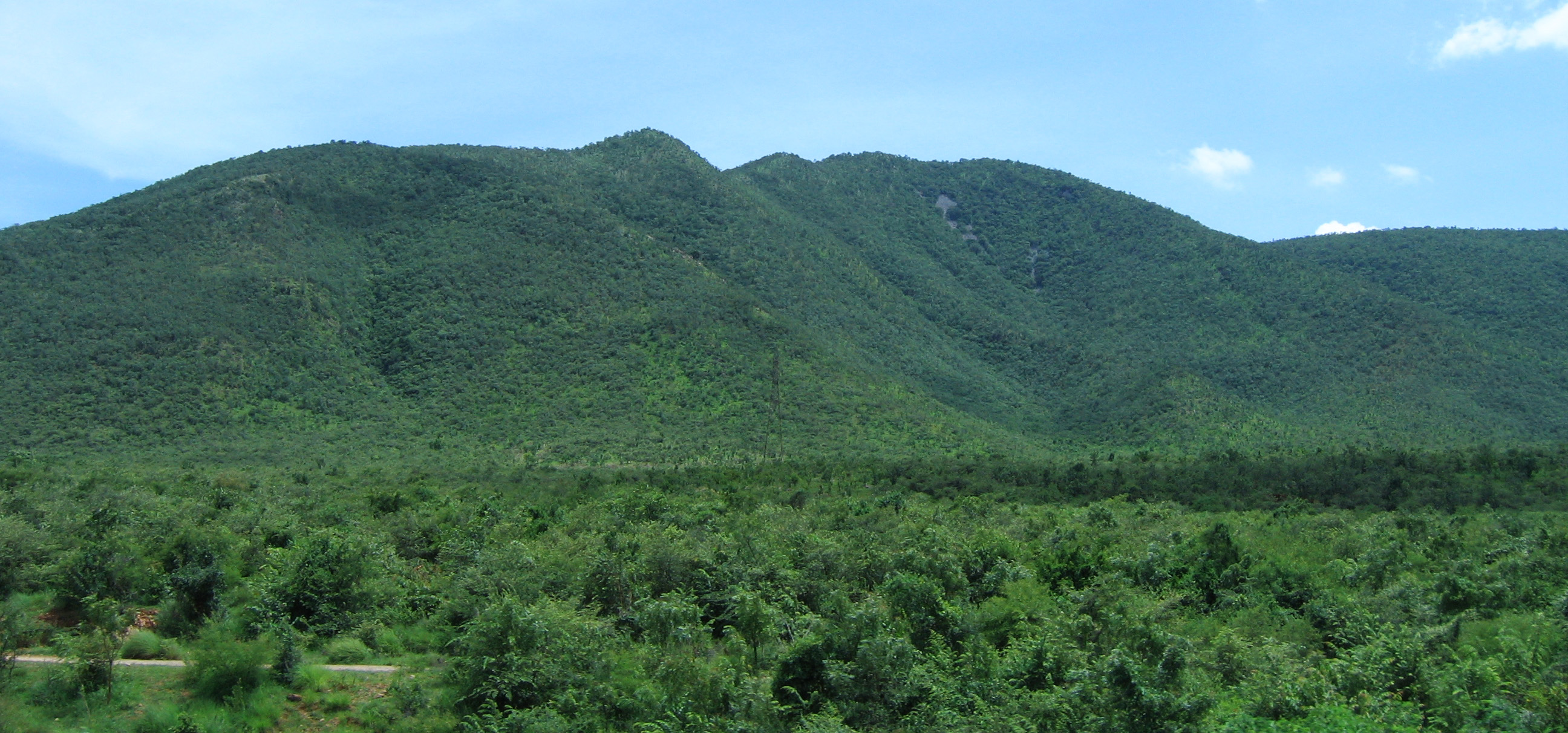
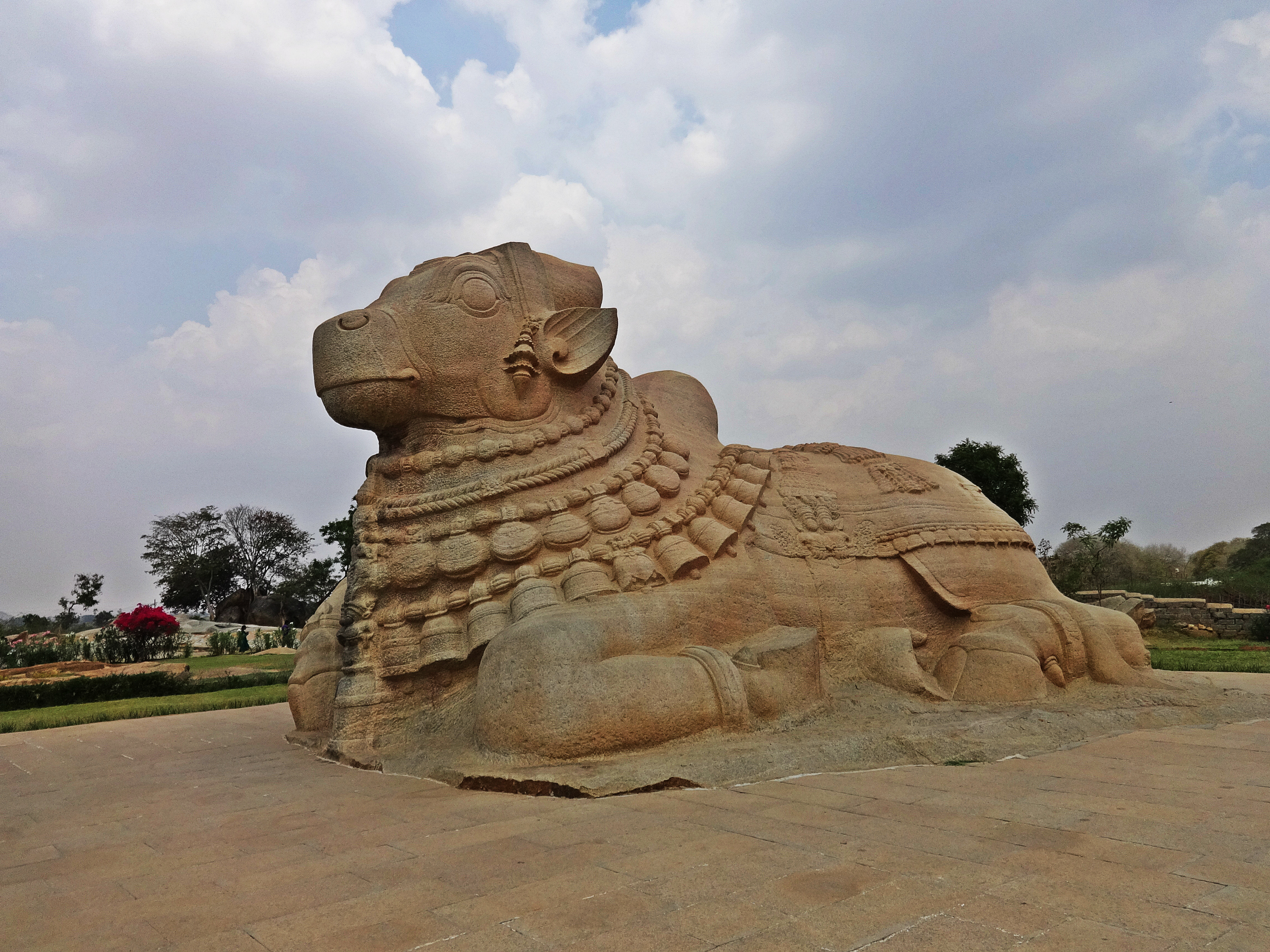
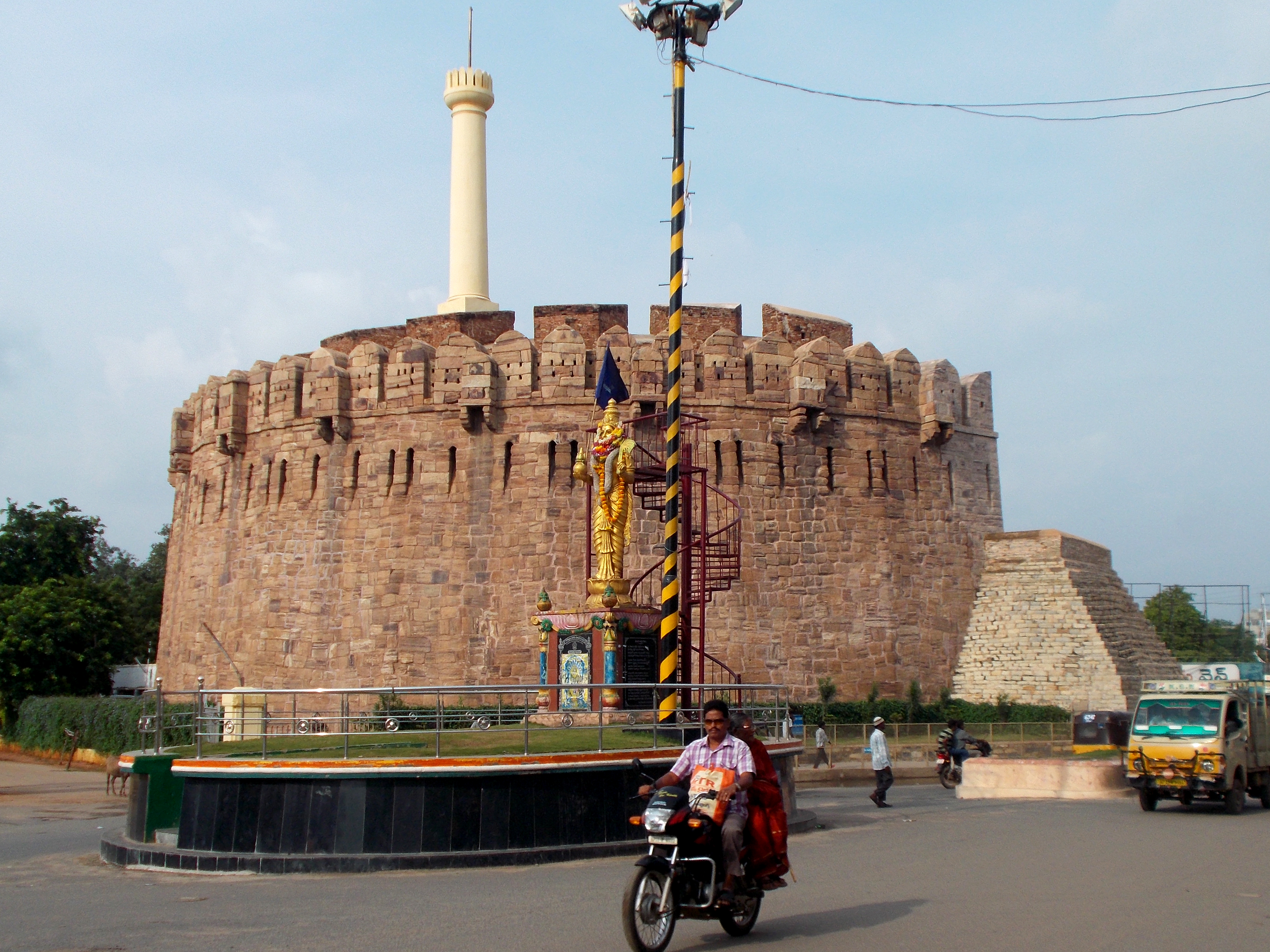
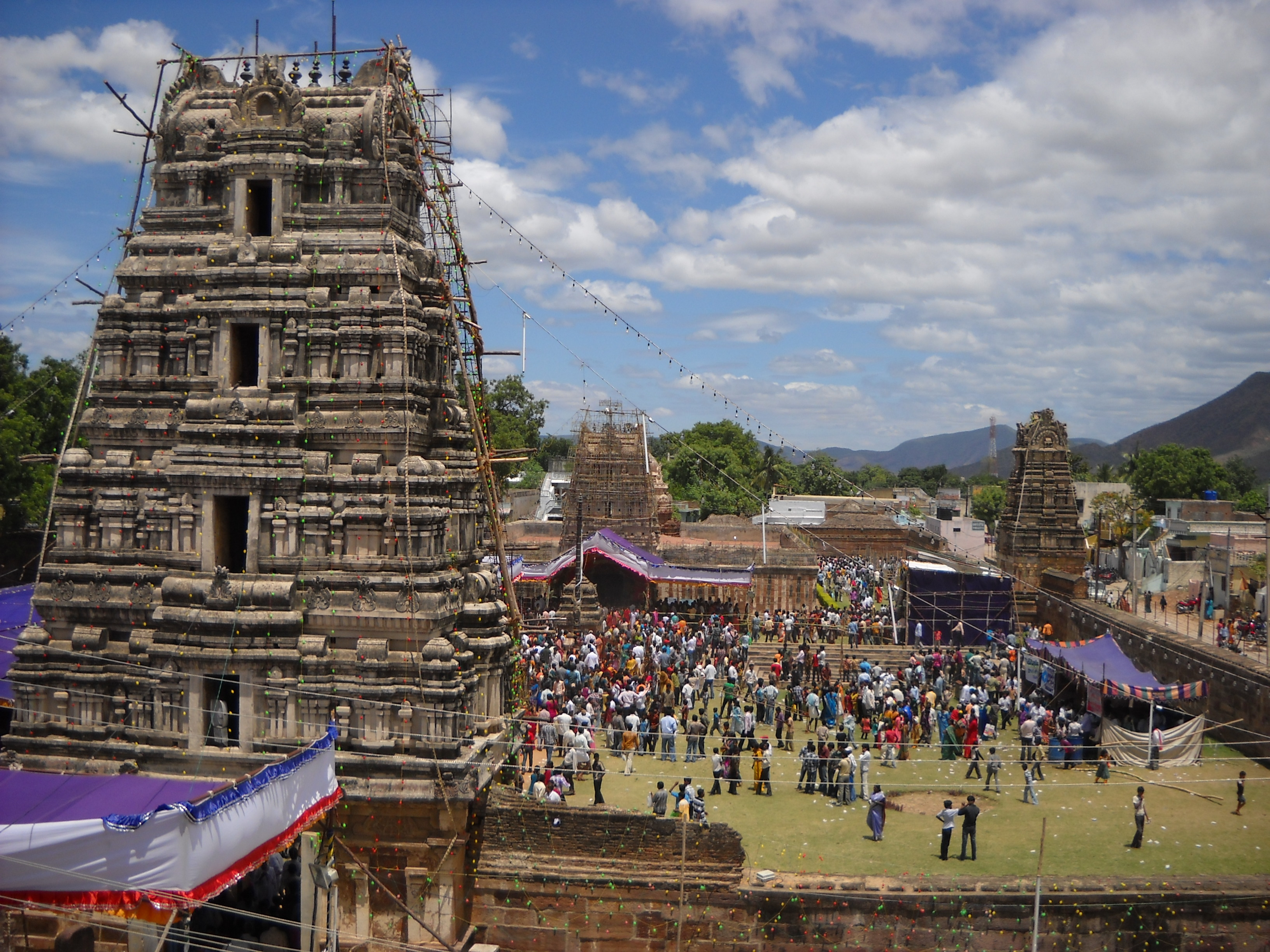
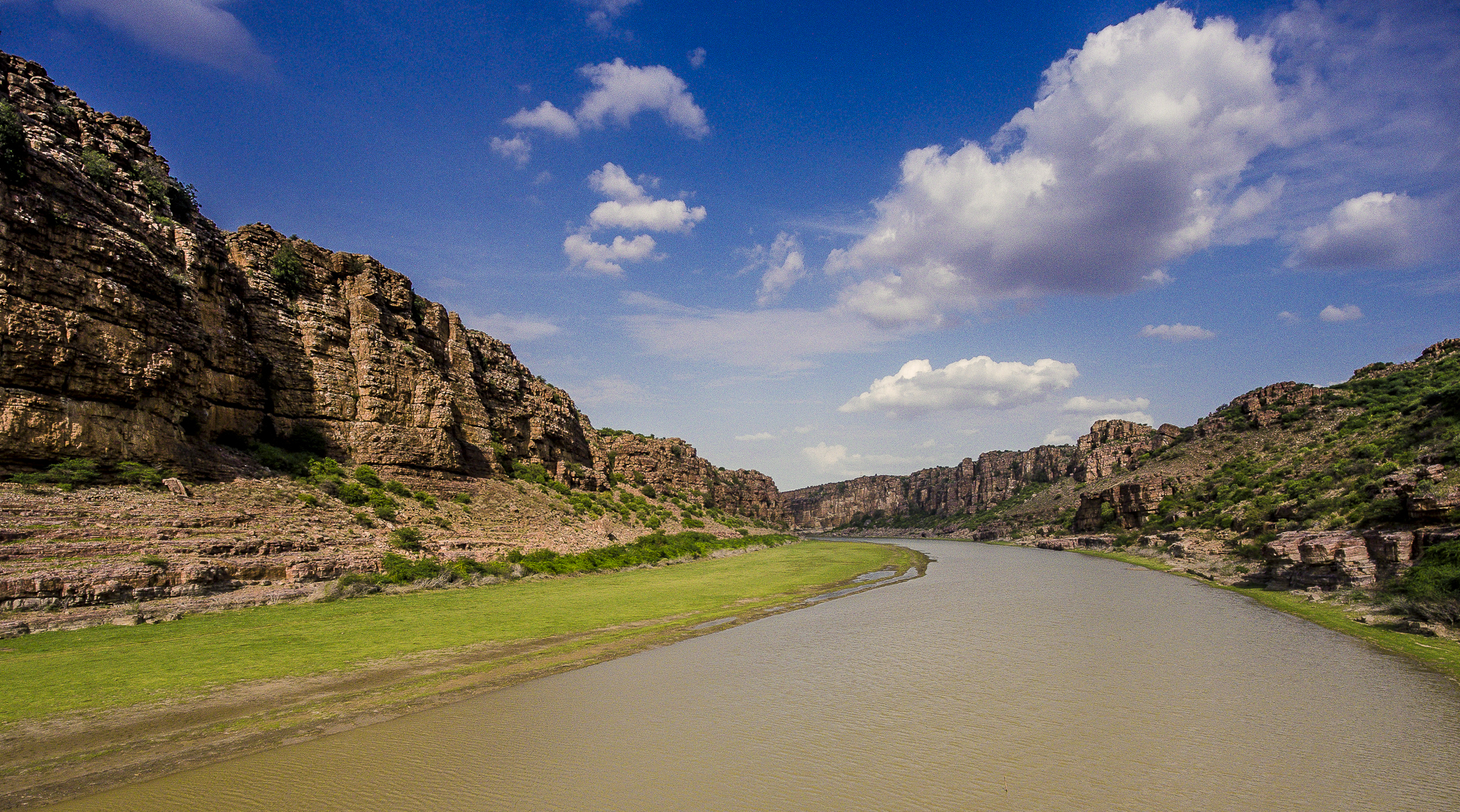
- Clockwise from top: Tirumala, Koundinya Wildlife Sanctuary, Lepakshi Monolithic Bull, Konda Reddy Fort, Sri Soumyanatha Swamy Temple (Nandalur), and Gandikota.
- Nickname: Cultural Region of Andhra Pradesh
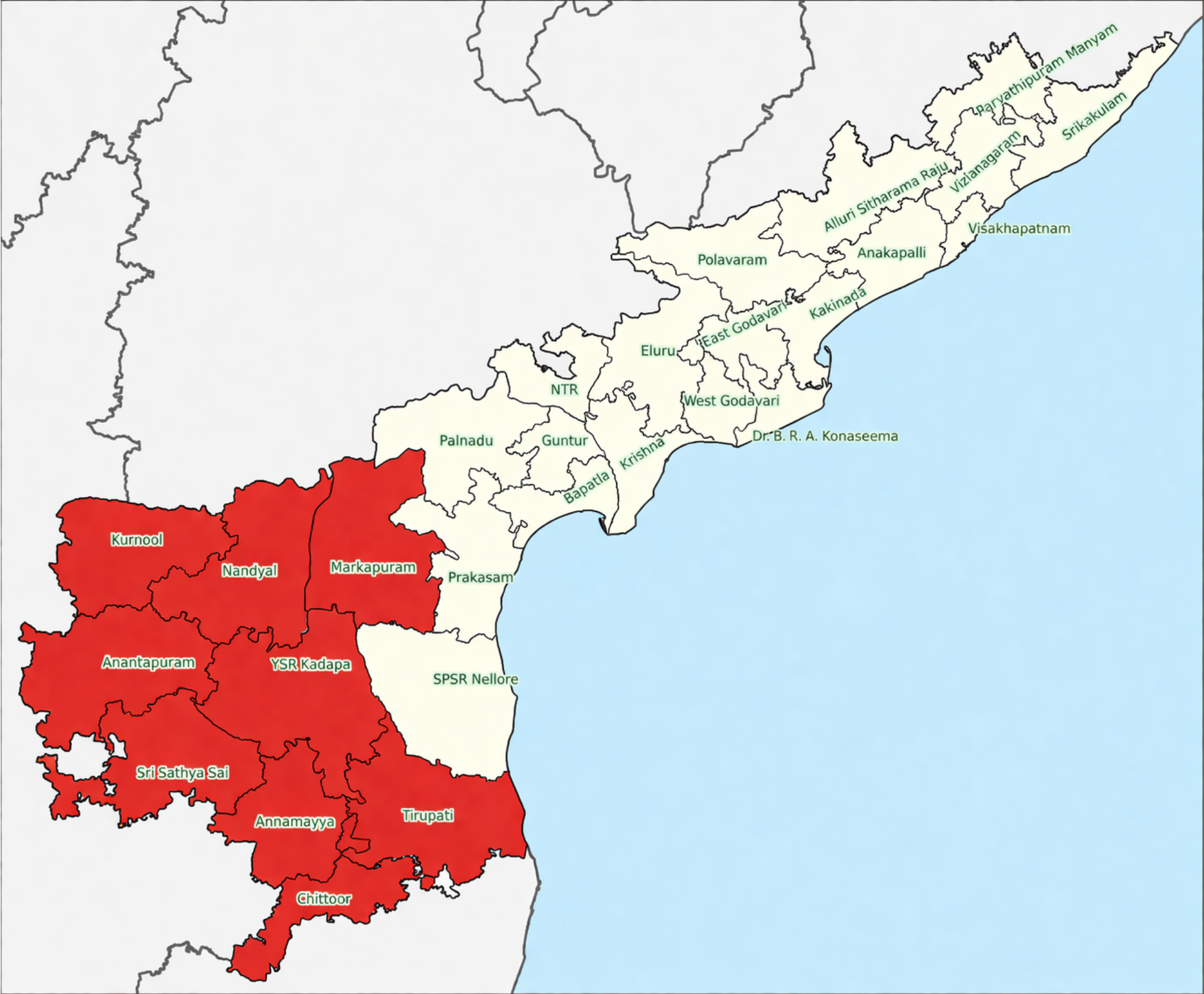
- Rayalaseema in Andhra Pradesh
- Country: India
- State: Andhra Pradesh
- District(s): Anantapuramu district; Annamayya district; Chittoor district; Kurnool district; Markapuram district; Nandyal district; Sri Sathya Sai district; Tirupati district; Kadapa district
- Largest cities: Tirupati; Kurnool; Kadapa; Anantapur

Area
  - Total: 81,234 km^{2} (31,365 sq mi)
  - Rank: 14

Population (2011)
  - Total: 15,184,908
  - Density: 246/km^{2} (640/sq mi)

Languages
  - Official: Telugu
- Time zone: UTC+05:30 (IST)
- Vehicle registration: AP02, AP03, AP04, AP21, AP39, AP40
- Largest airport: Tirupati Airport

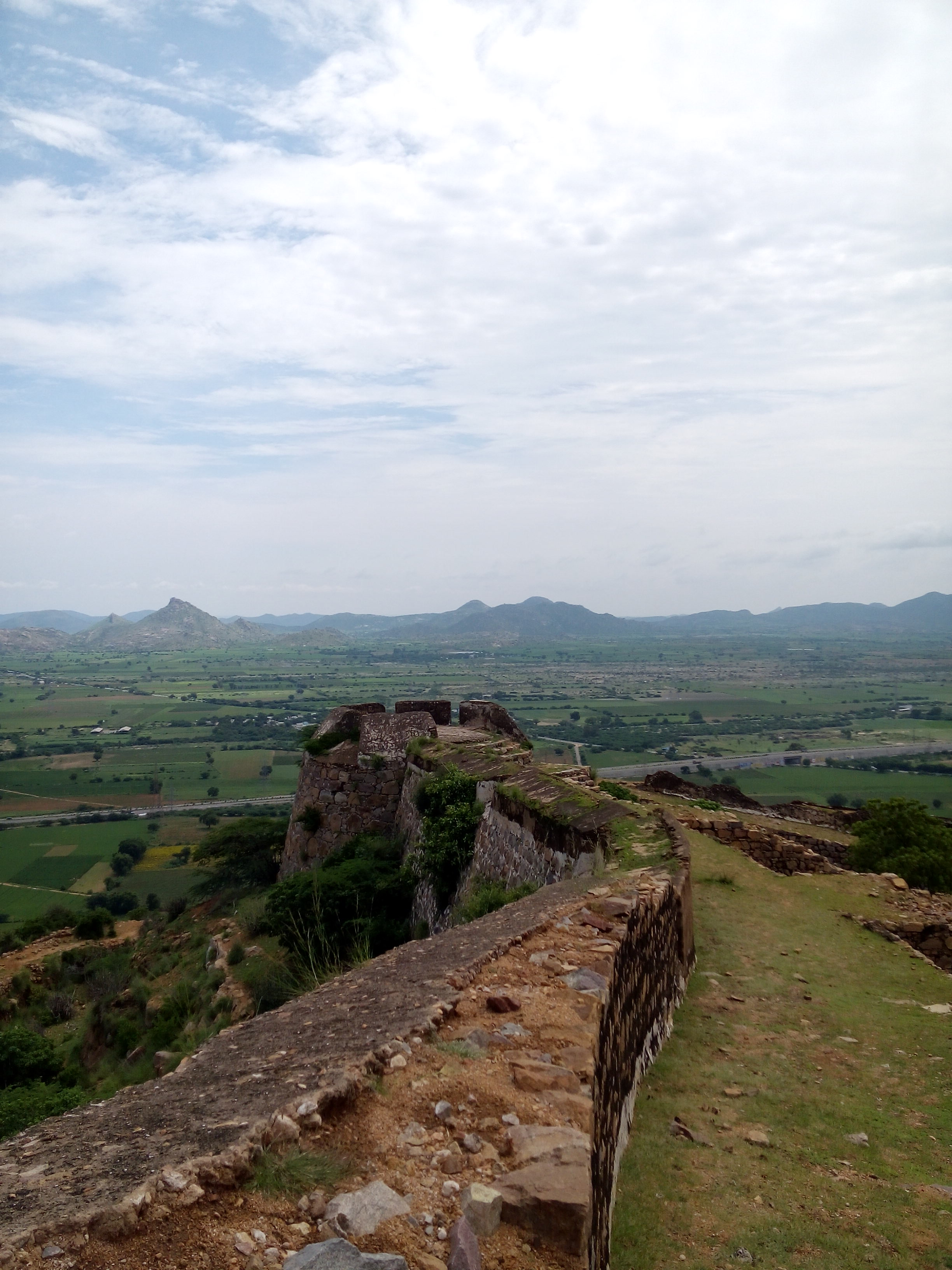
Gooty Fort In Anantapur District

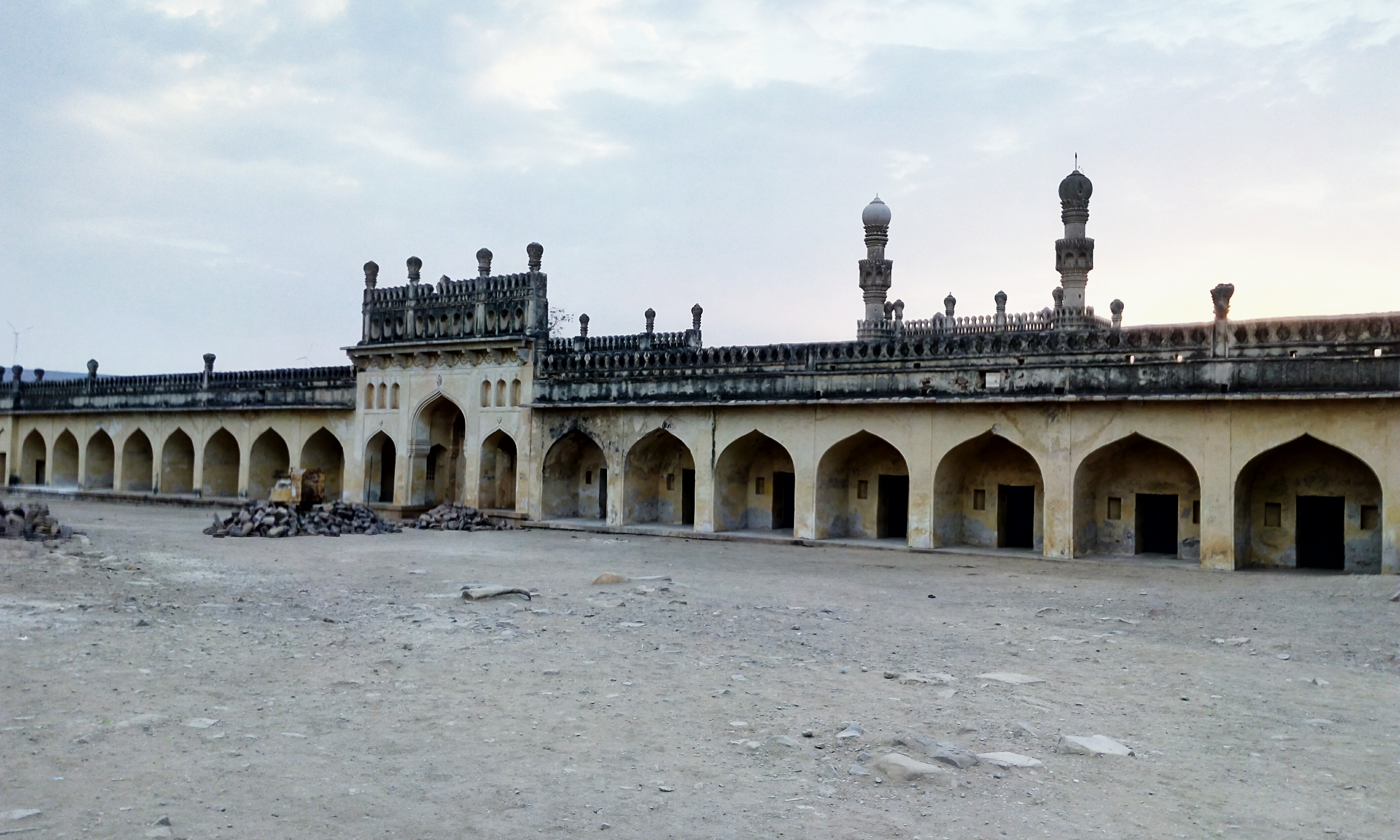
Gandikota Fort view

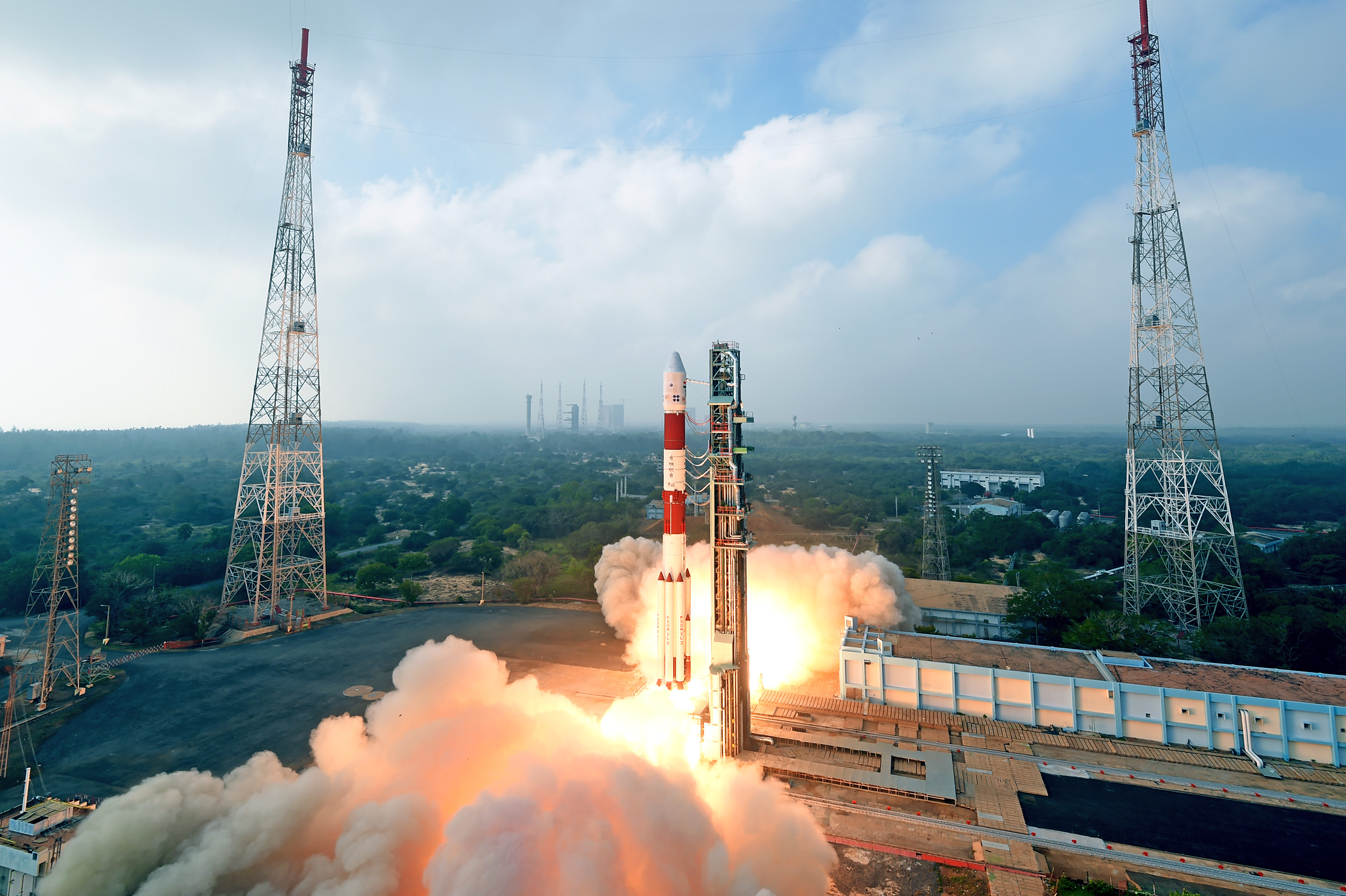
Satish Dhawan Space Centre In Tirupati District

Rayalaseema (ISO: Rāyalasīma) is a historically evolved and culturally distinct region in the Indian state of Andhra Pradesh.

It comprises nine southern districts of the State, namely Anantapur, Annamayya, Chittoor, Kadapa, Kurnool, Markapuram, Nandyal, Sri Sathya Sai, and Tirupati . As of 2011 census of India, the region had a population of 15,184,908 and cover an area of 81,234 km^{2} (31,365 sq mi). Literacy rates in the same year ranged from approximately 59.97% in Kurnool to 71.53% in Chittoor.

== Etymology ==
The region was previously called Ceded districts during the rule of the British Raj. This is with reference to the time when the Nizam of Hyderabad, Ali Khan, ceded the region to the British as a part of subsidiary alliance. Chilukuri Narayana Rao, a Telugu lecturer and activist from Anantapur, deemed the term "ceded" as derogatory and coined the term Rayalaseema. In the Andhra Mahasabha and Ceded Districts Conference held at Nandyala in November 1928, he moved a resolution to the effect which was accepted by the other delegates of the conference.

The name Rayalaseema hearkened back to the Vijayanagara times, whose Kings used a suffix Rāya (tadbhava of Sanskrit Rāja) or Rāyalu in Telugu as their regnal title. The boundaries of Rayalaseema roughly match the territorial extent of the Aravidu dynasty, the last dynasty to rule the Vijayanagara Empire. People of region coined their land as a Raya Desam.

=== Post independence ===
The four districts of the region were part of the Madras Presidency until 1953. From 1953 to 1956, the region was a part of Andhra State and in 1956, the Telangana region was merged with Andhra State to form Andhra Pradesh State. On 2 February 1970, three taluks from Kurnool i.e., Markapur, Cumbum and Giddalur were merged along with some other taluks of Nellore district and Guntur district to form Prakasam district.

In February 2014, the Andhra Pradesh Reorganisation Act, 2014 bill was passed by the Parliament of India for the formation of Telangana state comprising ten districts. Hyderabad will remain as a joint capital for 10 years for both Andhra Pradesh and Telangana. The new State of Telangana was inaugurated on June 2, 2014. The formation of a new state named Telangana from Andhra Pradesh is not considered an amendment to the Constitution of India per article 3 and 4 of that document.

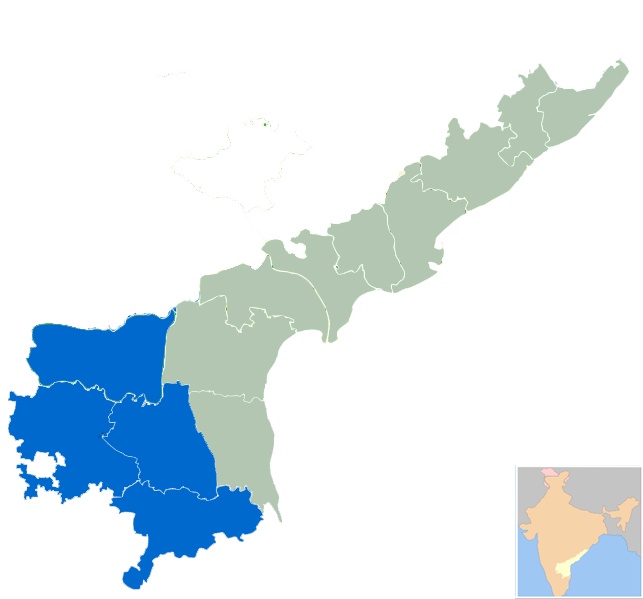
Rayalaseema districts before 4 April 2022

Languages of Rayalaseema
1. Telugu (81.1%)
2. Urdu (12.1%)
3. Tamil (3.00%)
4. Kannada (2.13%)
5. Others (1.68%)

== Geography ==
Rayalaseema region is located in the southern region of the state of Andhra Pradesh. The region borders the state of Tamil Nadu to the south, Karnataka to the west and Telangana to the north, Nellore, Markapuram districts and bay of Bengal in the east. Some areas in Coastal Andhra, such as Markapur revenue division of Markapuram district, share similar geography, culture and climate to Rayalaseema as they are once part of the Kurnool district.

=== Lake ===
The only lake located in the region of Rayalaseema is Pulicat Lake. The major part of the lake is located in Sullurpeta division of Tirupati district. Pulicat Lake is the second largest brackish water lagoon in India, (after Chilika Lake), measuring 759 square kilometres (293 sq mi). Major part of the lagoon comes under Tirupati district of Andhra Pradesh. The lagoon is one of the three important wetlands to attract northeast monsoon rain clouds during the October to December season. The lagoon comprises the following regions, which adds up 759 square kilometres (293 sq mi) according to Andhra Pradesh.

== Education ==
=== Universities ===
- Sri Venkateswara University
- Sri Krishnadevaraya University
- Yogi Vemana University
- Rayalaseema University
- Dr. Abdul Haq Urdu University
- Dravidian University
- Sri Padmavati Mahila Visvavidyalayam
- JNTU Anantapur
- Sanskrit Vidyapeeth

=== Medical colleges ===
- Sri Venkateswara Medical College, Tirupati
- Rajiv Gandhi Institute of Medical Sciences, Kadapa
- Kurnool Medical College
- Government Medical College, Anantapur
- Sri Padmavathi Medical College for Women, Tirupati
- Santharam Medical College, Nandyal
- PES Institute of Medical Sciences & Research, Kuppam
- Govt medical college, Pulivendula

=== Central institutions ===
- Indian Institute of Technology, Tirupati
- Indian Institute of Science Education and Research, Tirupati
- Indian Institute of Information Technology, Sri City
- Indian Culinary Institute, Tirupati
- National Sanskrit University
- Indian Institute of Information Technology, Design and Manufacturing, Kurnool
- Central University of Andhra Pradesh

=== Deemed Universities & Private Universities ===
- Annamacharya Institute of Technology And Science, Rajampet
- The Apollo University, Murukambattu, Chittoor
- Bharatiya Engineering Science and Technology Innovation University, Gownivaripalli, Sri Sathya Sai district
- Krea University, Sri City
- Great Lake International University, Sri City
- Madanapalle Institute of Technology and Science, Madanapalle
- Mohan Babu University, Tirupati
- Sri Sathya Sai University, Puttaparthi

== Transport ==
=== Roadways ===
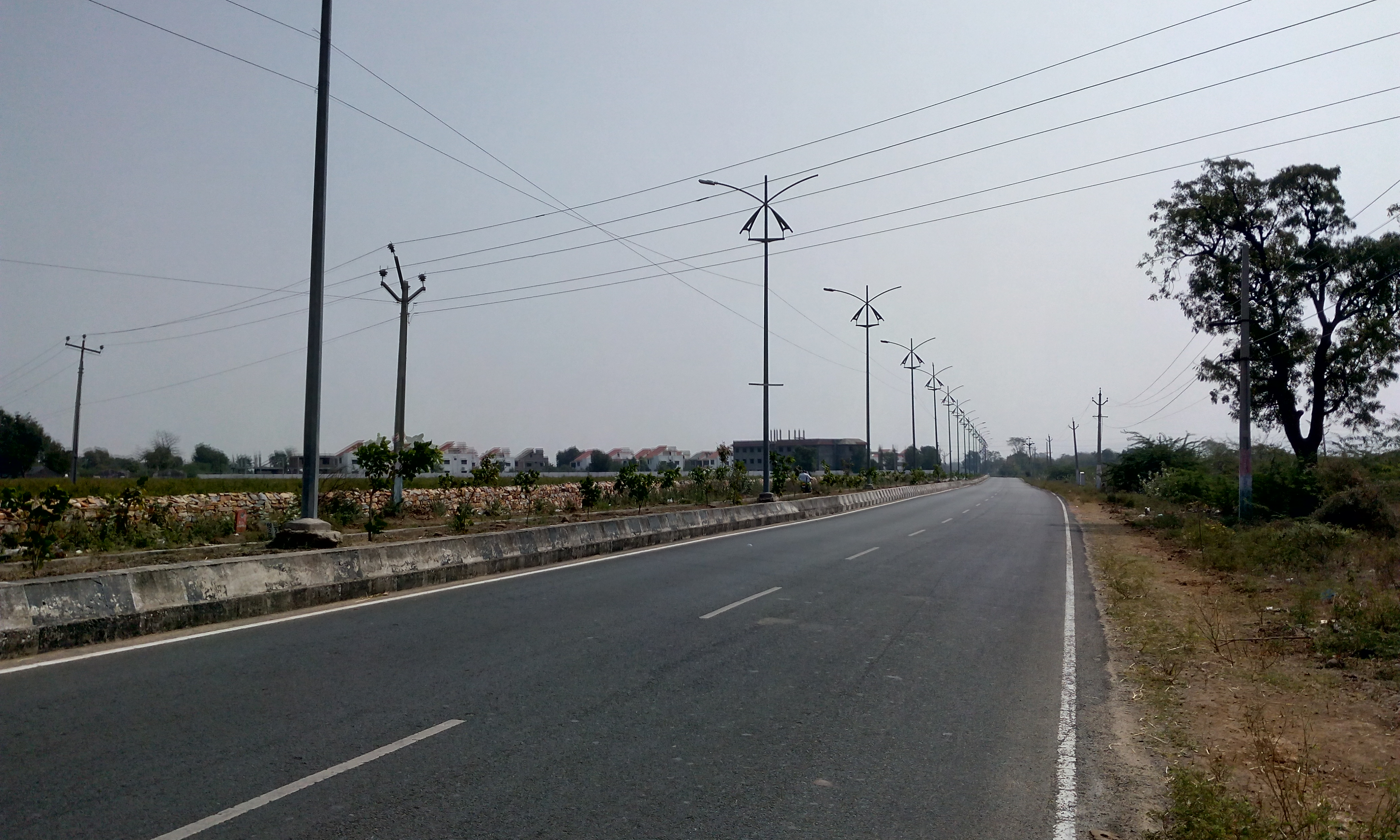
Pulivendula-Kadapa 4 lane road near pulivendula

The road network in region consists of many National Highways such as, NH 40, NH 42, NH 44, NH 140, NH 167, NH 340, NH 67, NH 69, NH 71, NH 716, NH 544F, NH 544G, and NH 544DD.

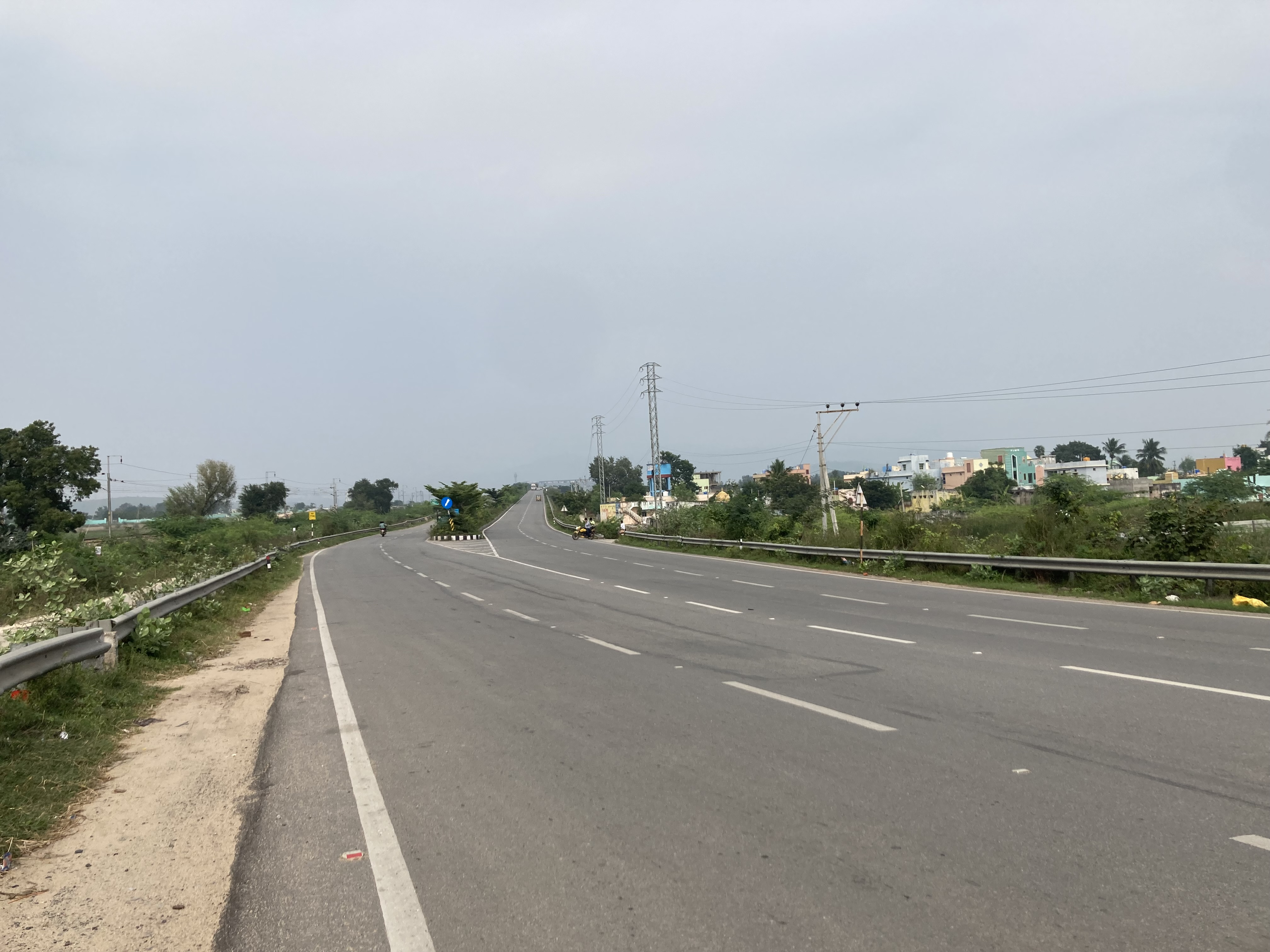
NH 716 near Renigunta

=== Railways ===
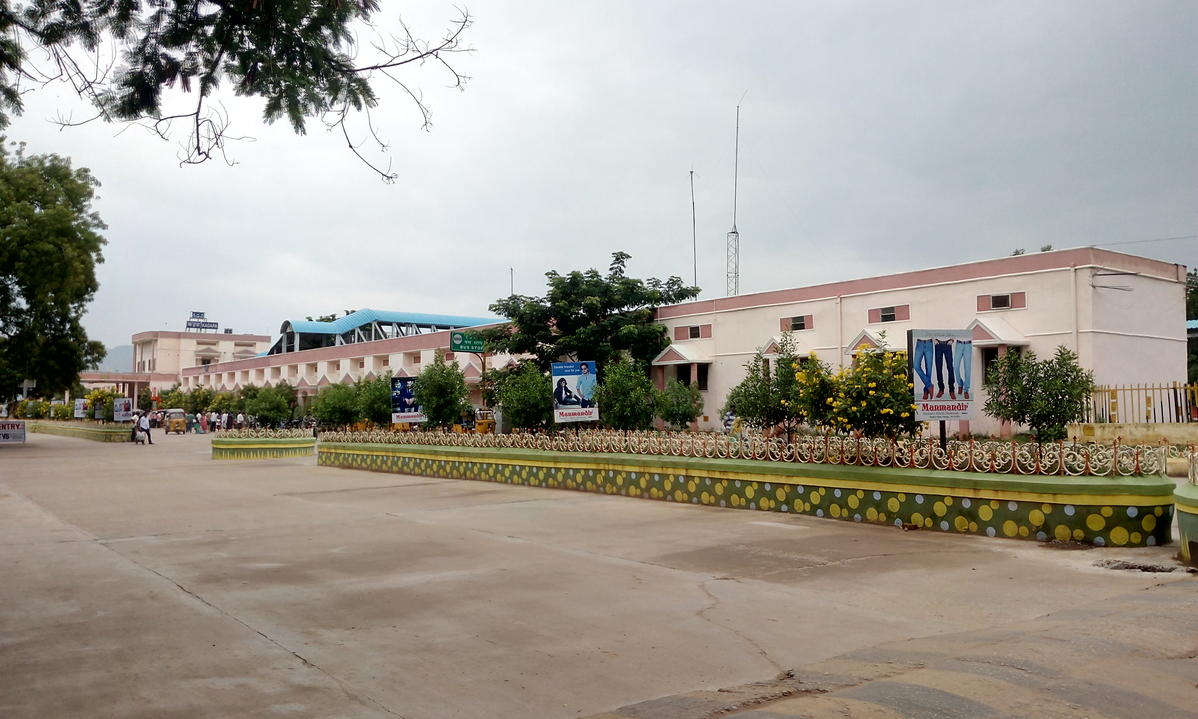
Kadapa Railway Station Premises

The rail connectivity is getting better with the projects allocated or being part of the region such as, Nandyal–Yerraguntla, Nadikudi–Srikalahasti, Kadapa–Bangalore sections are the under development projects which forms a part of the region. Most of the region falls under the jurisdiction of Guntakal railway division of South Central Railway zone.

=== Airports ===
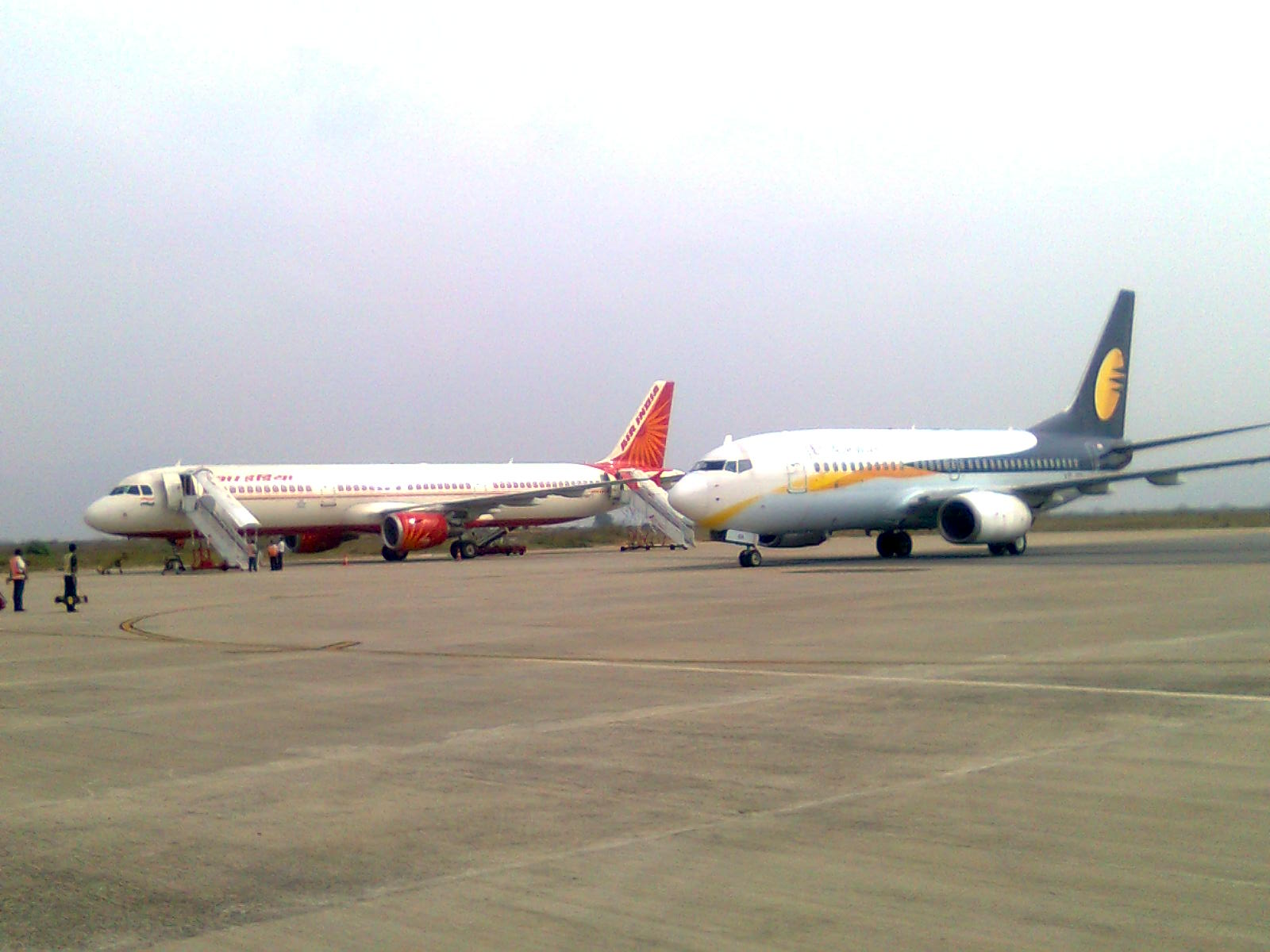
Air India and Jet Airways at Tirupati Airport

Rayalaseema region has air connectivity with four airports: Tirupati International Airport, Sri Sathya Sai Airport, Kadapa Airport and Kurnool Airport.

=== Waterways ===
Dugarajapatnam Port is a proposed port in Tirupati district.

== Infrastructure ==
=== Power ===
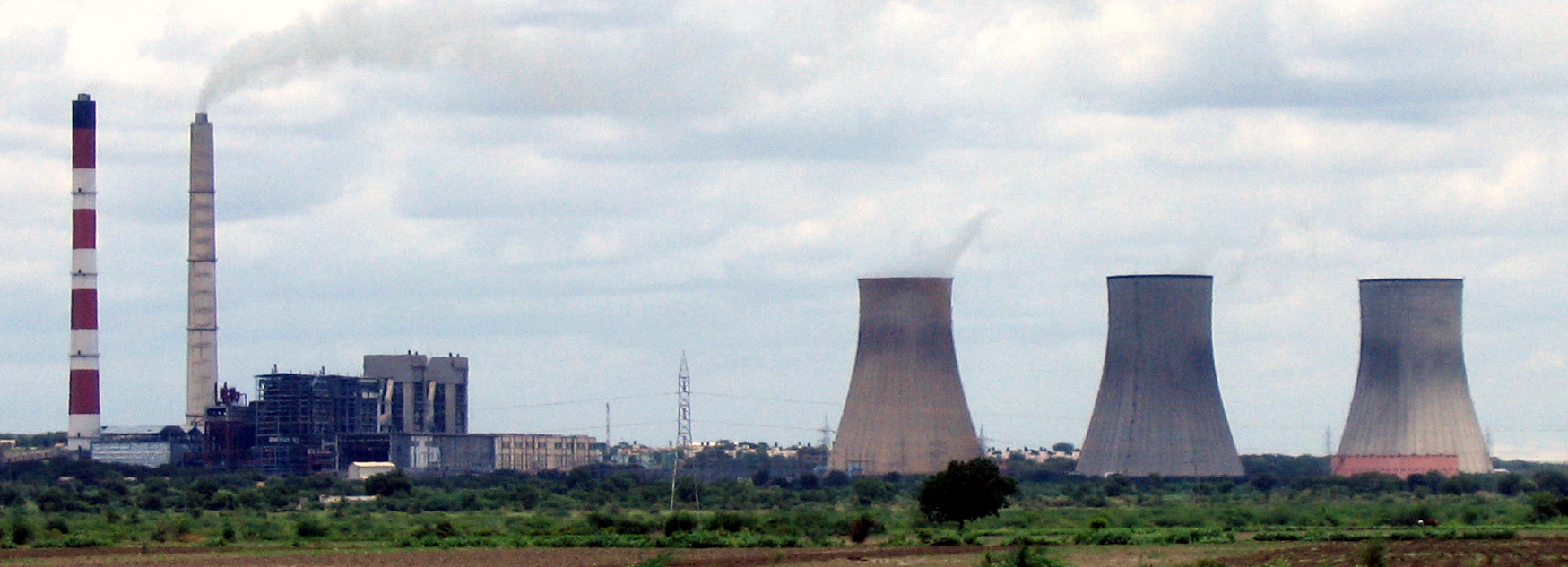
Rayalaseema Thermal Power Station

Rayalaseema Region has thermal as well solar power plants. Rayalaseema Thermal Power Station is located in Kadapa district and the Andhra Pradesh government recently sanctioned solar power parks in Rayalaseema districts with a capacity of 4000MW's. The state of Andhra Pradesh stood No.1 position in solar power generation with an installed capacity of 1868 MW in India and also offers the world's largest solar power park of 1000 MW.

== Politics ==
Neelam Sanjiva Reddy, Damodaram Sanjivayya, N. Janardhana Reddy, K.V. Bhaskara Reddy, N. Chandrababu Naidu, Y. S. Rajasekhara Reddy, N.Kiran Kumar Reddy and Y. S. Jagan Mohan Reddy, who served as Chief Minister of Andhra Pradesh, hail from the Rayalaseema region of the state. The region saw as many as 8 chief ministers for the state.

=== Factionalism ===
Rayalaseema is home to numerous factional families who are often intertwined with political parties and violently clash with each other. Government employees consider as dead postings in the region. The high crime rate is attributed to Rayalaseema's high poverty rate. Although violence has declined since 2000s. Police records estimate that in the past 35 years, about 8,465 civilians have died as a result of factional violence.

=== Sri Bagh act ===
Based on Sri Bagh Act signed on 18 November 1937, Kurnool was made the capital of the new state after the division of Andhra State from the Madras State. As per the second State Resolution Commission, the state capital was shifted to Hyderabad upon formation of Andhra Pradesh by States Reorganisation Act, 1956.

== See also ==
- Coastal Andhra
- Uttarandhra
- List of districts of Andhra Pradesh by regions
