= Venkata Rajula Kandriga =

- Village
- Interactive map of Venkata Rajula Kandriga
- Location in Andhra Pradesh, India Venkata Rajula Kandriga (India)
- Coordinates: 13.40665°N 79.932563°E
- Country: India
- State: Andhra Pradesh
- District: Tirupati
- Mandal: Sathyavedu

Population (2009)
  - Total: 900

Languages
  - Official: Telugu
- Time zone: UTC+5:30 (IST)
- PIN: 517588
- Vehicle registration: AP

Venkata Rajula Kandriga is a small village in Sathyavedu mandal, located in Tirupati district of Andhra Pradesh, India. As of 2020 its population is 1907. The total area of Venkatarajula Kandriga is 1297 hectares.
