= Koduru railway station =

Railway station in Andhra Pradesh, India

Koduru

General information
- Location: Railway Kodur, Tirupati, Andhra Pradesh; India
- Coordinates: 13°56′54.89″N 79°20′44.48″E
- System: Indian Railways station
- Owner: Indian Railways
- Operator: Indian Railways
- Line: Renigunta–Guntakal section
- Platforms: 2-3
- Tracks: 5 ft 6 in (1,676 mm) broad gauge

Construction
- Structure type: Standard (on ground)
- Accessible: Disabled access

Other information
- Station code: KOU
- Zone(s): SCoR
- Division(s): Guntakal
Location
- Location within Andhra Pradesh Location within India

Koduru railway station (station code:KOU) is an Indian Railway station in Railway Kodur located in Tirupati district of Andhra Pradesh. It is situated on Renigunta–Guntakal section and is administered by South Coast Railway zone.

== See also ==
- List of railway stations in India
