= Cherlopalle =

Neighbourhood in Andhra Pradesh, India

- Tirupati Neighbourhood
- Location in Andhra Pradesh, India
- Coordinates: 13°36′49.49″N 79°21′50.96″E
- Country: India
- State: Andhra Pradesh
- District: Tirupati

Area
  - Total: 3.94 km^{2} (1.52 sq mi)
- Elevation: 667 m (2,188 ft)

Population (2011)
  - Total: 6,143
  - Density: 1,560/km^{2} (4,040/sq mi)

Languages
  - Official: Telugu
- Time zone: UTC+5:30 (IST)
- PIN: 517505
- Telephone code: +91–8586
- Vehicle registration: AP–03

Cherlopalle is a neighbourhood located in Tirupati city in Tirupati district of the Indian state of Andhra Pradesh. It forms a part of Tirupati urban agglomeration and is located in Tirupati revenue division.
