= Devara Konda =

- Village
- Interactive map of Devara Konda
- Location in Andhra Pradesh, India Devara Konda (India)
- Coordinates: 13.7106161°N 79.1913562°E
- Country: India
- State: Andhra Pradesh
- District: Tirupati district

Languages
  - Official: Telugu
- Time zone: UTC+5:30 (IST)

Devara Konda is a village in Tirupati district, Andhra Pradesh, India. The name appears to come from the title of a small hill, Devara Konda (God's Hill; a temple sits on that hill).
