= Penagalur =

- Village
- Interactive map of Penagalur
- Location in Andhra Pradesh, India
- Coordinates: 14.2833°N 79.2667°E
- Country: India
- State: Andhra Pradesh
- District: Tirupati

Languages
  - Official: Telugu
- Time zone: UTC+5:30 (IST)
- Vehicle registration: AP

Penagalur is a village in Tirupati district of the Indian state of Andhra Pradesh. It is located in Penagalur mandal .

== Geography ==
Penagaluru is located at 14.2833°N 79.2667°E. It has an average elevation of 103 meters 341 feet).
