= NH 140 =

NH 140 may refer to:

- National Highway 140 (India)
- New Hampshire Route 140, United States
