= Padamati Yaleru =

Village in Andhra Pradesh, India

Padamati Yaleru is a village in [[Atmakur mandal, Anantapur district]Atmakur mandal]] of Anantapur District of Andhra Pradesh, India. It is located in the Rayalaseema region of Andhra Pradesh.

We are also recognized as one of the 3 villages in India that has 100% literacy for the year of 2012. The award is presented on 8 September 2012.
