= Nennur =

- Village
- Interactive map of Nennur
- Location in Andhra Pradesh, India Nennur (India)
- Coordinates: 13°33′01″N 79°25′49″E
- Country: India
- State: Andhra Pradesh
- District: Tirupati district

Languages
  - Official: Telugu
- Time zone: UTC+5:30 (IST)
- Vehicle registration: AP-
- Coastline: 0 kilometres (0 mi)

Nennur is a village in the Tirupati district, Andhra Pradesh, India. The village is located in the Ramachandrapuram mandal.
