= Railway Koduru =

Railway Koduru Vemaluru
- Town
- Nickname: Koduru
- Location in Andhra Pradesh, India
- Coordinates: 13.9569°N 79.3506°E
- Country: India
- State: Andhra Pradesh
- Region: Rayalaseema
- District: Tirupati district
- Mandal: Koduru

Government
  - Body: panchayath
  - MP: P. V. Midhun Reddy
  - MLA: Arava Sreedhar

Area
  - Total: 10 km^{2} (3.9 sq mi)
- Elevation: 190 m (620 ft)

Languages
  - Official: Telugu
- Time zone: UTC+5:30 (IST)
- PIN: 516101
- Telephone code: 08566
- Vehicle registration: AP04

Railway Koduru is a town in Tirupati district of the Indian state of Andhra Pradesh, located in the Rayalaseema Region.

== Assembly constituency ==
Railway Koduru is an SC reserved assembly constituency in Andhra Pradesh.
