= Dugarajapatnam Port =

Proposed port in Andhra Pradesh, India

- Interactive map of Dugarajapatnam Port
- Location within Andhra Pradesh

Location
- Country: India
- Location: Dugarajapatnam, Tirupati district, Andhra Pradesh
- Coordinates: 14.056°N 80.145°E

Details
- Owned by: Ministry of Shipping, Government of India
- Relocated: to

Dugarajapatnam Port is a proposed seaport in Vakadu mandal, Tirupati district of Andhra Pradesh, India. Construction was expected to start in 2020 and finish in 2023. It will be controlled by the Union government, alongside Visakhapatnam Port in the state of Andhra Pradesh, and would cost nearly ₹8,000 crore (US$830 million). The port is set up under India's Companies Act, 1956 with equity participation of the government of Andhra Pradesh.

== Relocation ==
The construction encountered certain objections as the sensitive ecosystem of Pulicat Lake and the satellite launching station ISRO of Sriharikota are very near to Duggarajapatnam. After environmental and forest clearances, the location was shifted to Vagarru at Tupilipalem village. Tupilipalem is located 20 km from Dugarajapatnam, but the port will be still be referred to as Dugarajapatnam Port. The district administration is taking steps to acquire approximately 5,028 acres (2,035 ha) of land at the new location.
