= Sri Soumyanatha Swamy Temple (Nandalur) =

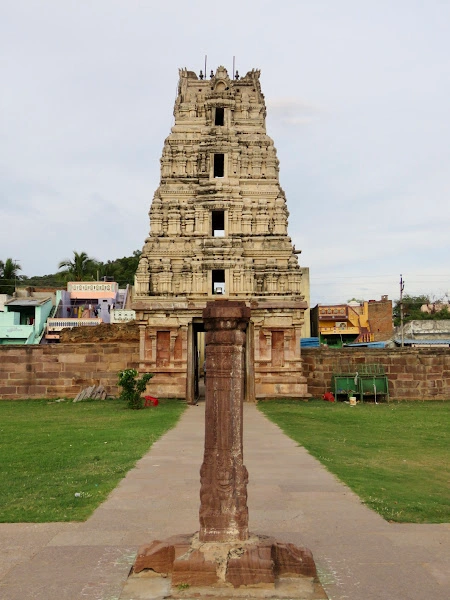

Religion
- Affiliation: Hinduism
- District: YSR Kadapa
- Deity: Vishnu

Location
- Location: Nandalur
- State: Andhra Pradesh
- Country: India
- Interactive map of Sri Soumyanatha Swamy Temple
- Coordinates: 14.2500°N 79.1167°E

Sri Soumyanatha Swamy Temple is a Hindu temple to Vishnu, located in Nandalur, Nandalur mandal of the Kadapa district, Andhra Pradesh, India. The temple is known for its 7-feet-high idol of Soumyanatha.

== Architecture ==
The temple is an excellent example of Dravidian architecture, characterized by its towering gopurams (temple towers), spacious courtyards, and intricate sculptures. The main sanctum (garbhagriha) houses the 7-feet-high idol of Soumyanatha, depicted in a calm and benevolent posture. The temple complex is expansive and includes several subsidiary shrines dedicated to other deities, making it a comprehensive pilgrimage site for devotees.
