= Institute for Financial Management and Research =

Private business school located at Sri City in Andhra Pradesh, India

IFMR Graduate School of Business
- Type: Private business school
- Established: 1970; 56 years ago
- Affiliations: UGC
- Chancellor: Lakshmi Narayanan
- Vice-Chancellor: Dr. Nirmala Rao
- Dean: Dr. Lakshmi Kumar
- Location: Sri City, Andhra Pradesh, India; 13.551884°N 79.995392°E
- Campus: Urban Residential
- Website: krea.edu.in/ifmrgsb/

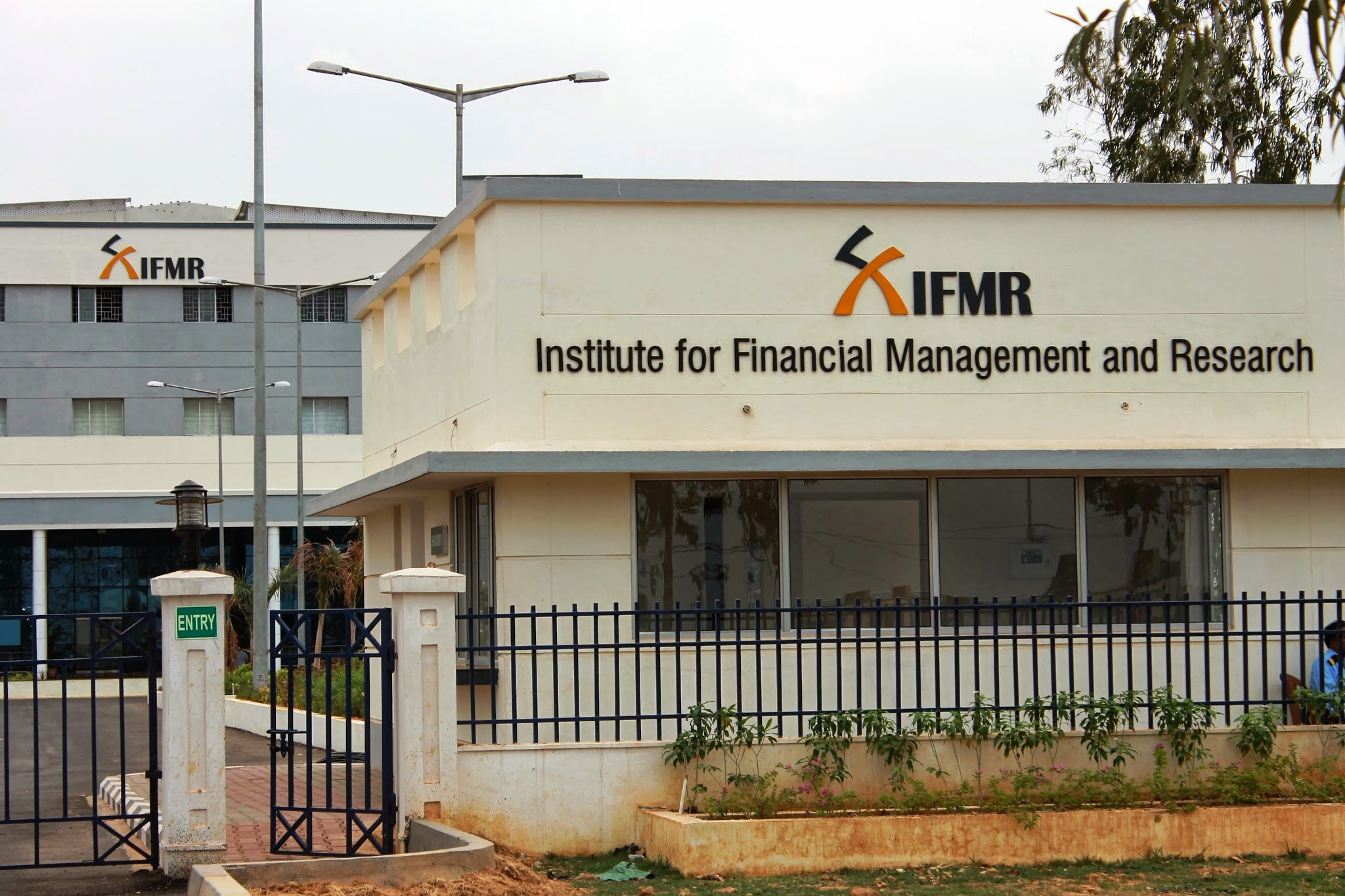

IFMR - Graduate School of Business at Krea University is a private business school located at Sri City, in Andhra Pradesh, India, about 70 km from Chennai. IFMR offered a 2-year PGDM program which is accredited by AICTE till 2016. Currently, it offers a 2-year MBA program. It is an approved institution by the University of Madras for pursuing a Ph.D. degree in Finance, Economics and Management.

== Programs ==
MBA: The MBA program is a two-year full-time program with six trimesters and two months of summer internship. The program was launched in the year 2000 and currently offers core specializations in Finance and Accounting, Marketing, Human Resource and Operations. The other specializations offered in this program are Quantitative Finance, Economics, Data Science & Information Systems, and Strategy Management. The sanctioned annual intake is 240 students for this program.

Executive Programs: IFMR provides executive programs viz. consulting, certificate as well as fully customized training programs and management development programs, and has to date trained over 15,000 middle and senior managers across various functional disciplines from government, banking, public and private sectors.

PhD: IFMR offers PhD programs in affiliation with the University of Madras and IIT Madras. Disciplines offered include Economics, Finance & Accounting, HR & OB, Strategy and Operations Management.

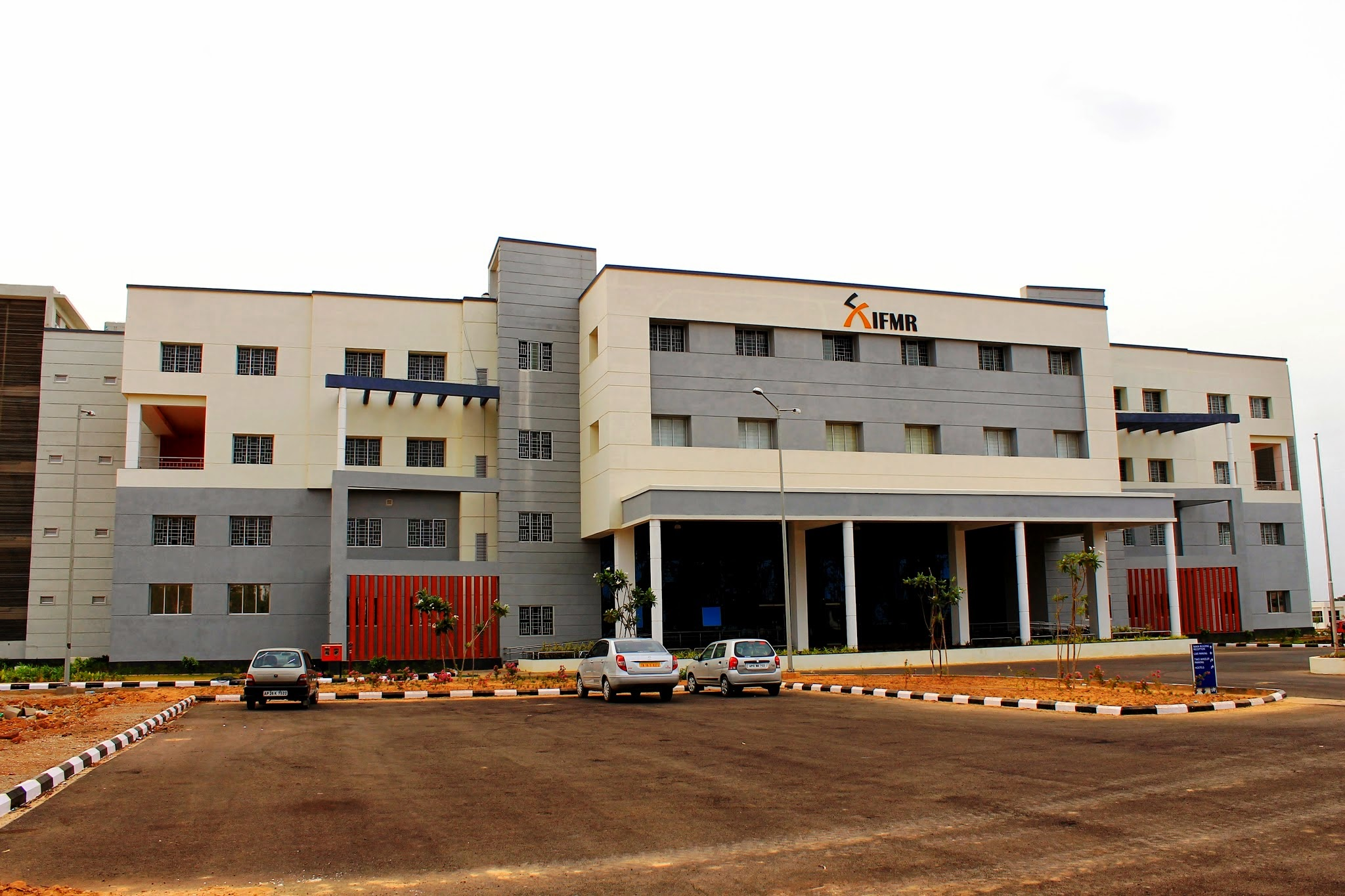
Main Block

== Accreditation ==
IFMR GSB is accredited by the University Grants Commission (UGC) and the university has been a member of SAQS (South Asian Quality System) since December 2017 for a period of five years. SAQS is run by AMDISA (Association of Management Development Institutes in South Asia). The college has received recognition from the CFA Institute (USA) which allows meritorious students to get scholarship opportunities for the program.
