= Indian Culinary Institute, Tirupati =

Coordinates: 13.62067°N 79.53729°E

ICI Tirupati

Indian Culinary Institute, Tirupati(ICI-Tirupati) is the first culinary institute established by the Indian Tourism Ministry to be located in Tirupati in Tirupati District of Andhra Pradesh. It began classes during academic year 2016–17 on a temporary campus on the premises of the State Institute of Hotel Management (SIHM) in Alipiri. The admissions are done through the Joint Entrance Exam (JEE) for a three-year Bachelor of Business Administration in Culinary Art (BBA – Culinary) in affiliation with IGNTU-Amarkantak. In 2018, the institute shifted to its own campus near Tirupati Airport. In the same year it also opened its Noida Campus for the culinary aspirants.

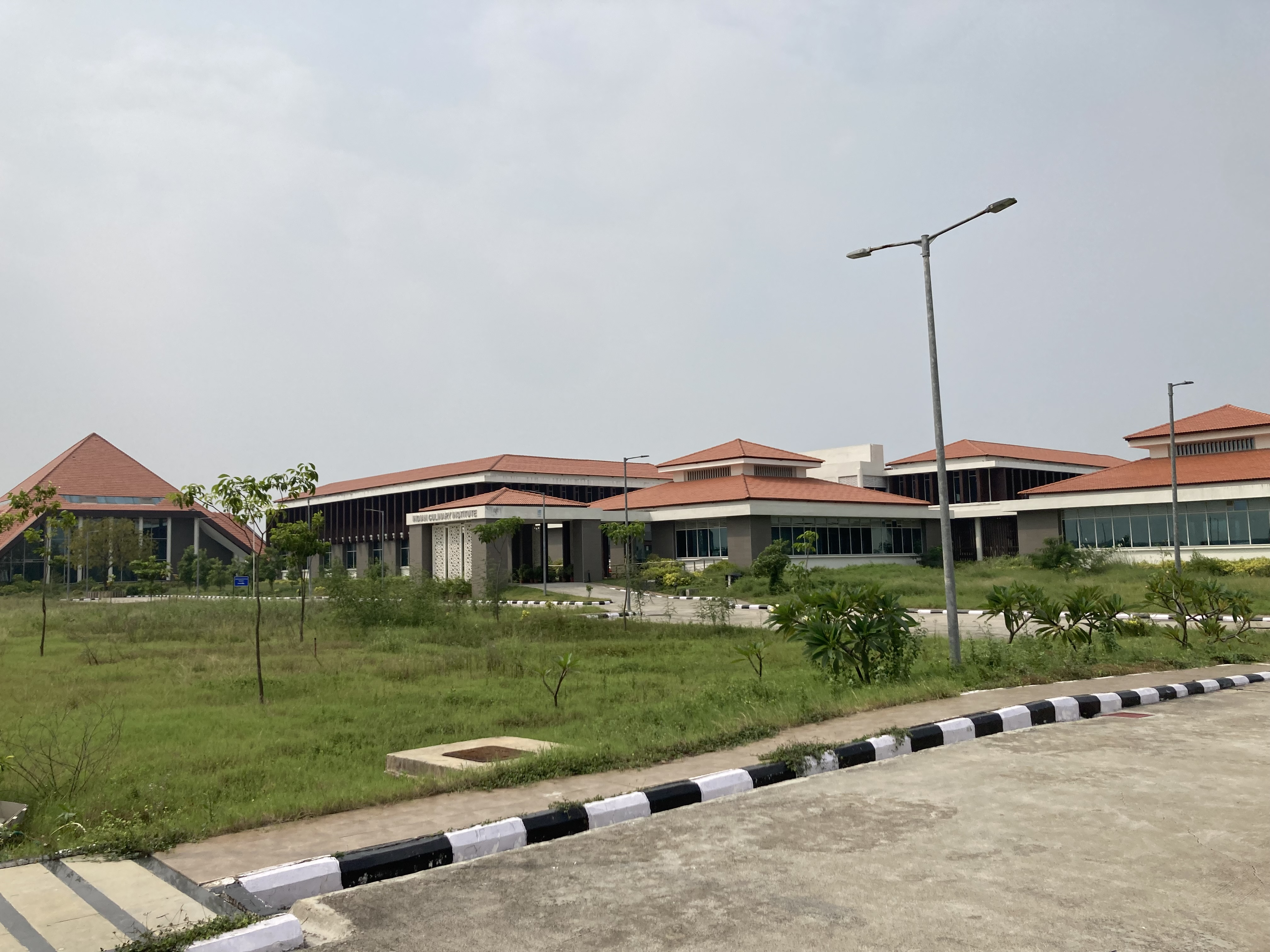
ICI Tirupati Campus view

From academic year 2019–20, it launched a 2 year MBA program (MBA in Culinary Arts) at both campuses.
