= Government Institute of Ceramic Technology =

Polytechnic in Andhra Pradesh

Government Institute of Ceramic Technology, Gudur
- Type: Technical/Education
- Established: 1952
- Affiliation: AICTE
- Principal: C. Narendranath Reddy
- Academic staff: 10+
- Location: Malavya Nagar, Gudur, Tirupati District, Andhra Pradesh, India

Government Institute of Ceramic Technology is statewide institution in Andhra Pradesh. It is located in Gudur in Tirupati district. It is established in 1952. Government Institute of Ceramic Technology is an autonomous institute offering Diploma in Ceramic Technology that caters to the changing needs of industry, business and community at large using need based curricular delivered in a dynamic learning environment. AICTE approved full-time programs are offered to candidates selected as per POLYCET conducted by the government of Andhra Pradesh. The polytechnic also maintains relations with accreditations bodies like All India Council for Technical Education (AICTE) and State Board of Technical Education (SBTETAP).

== Campus details ==
It is located in Malavya Nagar in Gudur, Tirupati district. It has a 10 acres of land with hostel facilities to students. It is offering only Diploma in Ceramic Technology. It is a sandwich course. One year implant training will be provided. It is a three and half years diploma course. The intake of the course is 60. The students are admitted through AP POLYCET entrance exam and seats are allotted through AP POLYCET counselling

== Campus Activities ==
Cultural activities are conducted in the second semester of the year for annual college day function. Various sports and games are also held within the campus ground and the institute actively takes part in Inter Polytechnic Sports and Games Meet (IPSGM) every year.
