= Sri City =

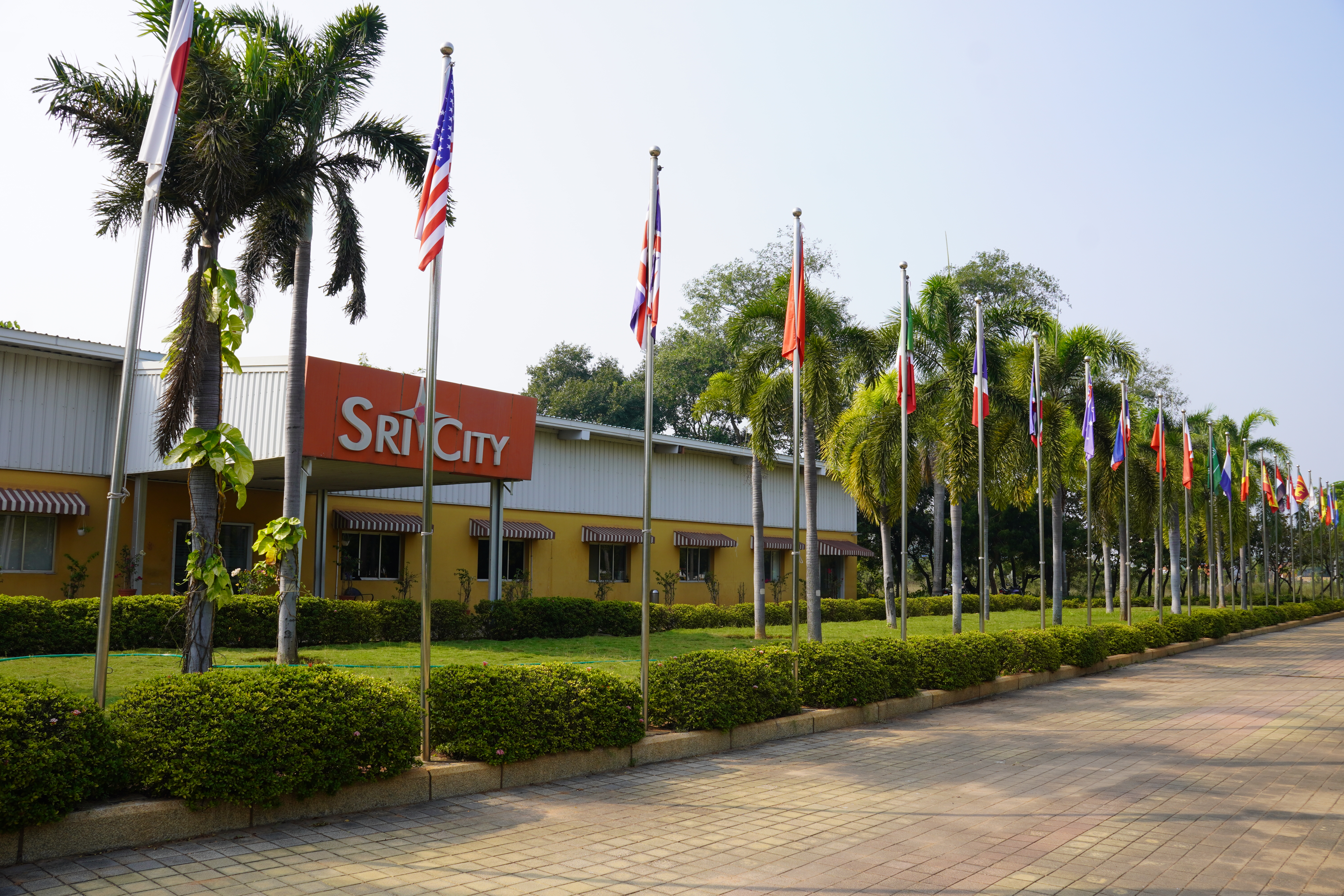
- Sri City office and flags

- Location within Andhra Pradesh
- Coordinates: 13.557673°N 80.029489°E
- Country: India
- State: Andhra Pradesh
- District: Tirupati district

Area
  - Total: 69.88697 km^{2} (26.98351 sq mi)
  - Rank: 24
  - Rank: 414

Languages
  - Official: Telugu
  - Other: Tamil; English
- Time zone: UTC+5:30 (IST)
- Website: SriCity

Sri City (Satyavedu Reserve Infracity Pvt. Ltd.) is a large-scale integrated business city and Special Economic Zone (SEZ) situated in the Tirupati district of Andhra Pradesh, India.

Spanning over 7,500 acres, Sri City is strategically located along National Highway 16 (NH16), a major economic corridor in India. The township's infrastructure is designed to support a diverse range of industries, incorporating a multi-product Special Economic Zone (SEZ), a Domestic Tariff Zone (DTZ), a Free Trade and Warehousing Zone (FTWZ), and an Electronics Manufacturing Cluster. This unique combination of zones allows Sri City to cater to both export-oriented and domestic industries, attracting a wide spectrum of companies from various sectors, including manufacturing, engineering, and information technology. It is administratively part of the Satyavedu and Varadaiahpalem mandals within the Tirupati district.

== History ==
It was founded by Ravindra Sannareddy and Srini Raju, who are currently the managing director and chairman, respectively, and are members of its Board of Governors. Sri City was inaugurated on August 8, 2008, by the then-Chief Minister of Andhra Pradesh, Y. S. Rajasekhara Reddy.

== Geography ==
It is situated between 13°29’50"N and 13°34’40"N and 79°57’30"E and 80°02’50"E, at an average elevation of about 20 meters above MSL (66 ft) in Tirupati district of Andhra Pradesh. It is alongside NH 5 which forms part of the Golden Quadrilateral. A creek (Karipeti Kalava) flows through Sri City passing through a number of lakes on the way to joining Pulicat Lake north of Tada. There is a state forest on the western boundary. The Telugu Ganga project carrying Krishna River water to Chennai passes along the western boundary of Sri City.

== Languages ==
Telugu is the official and most-spoken language besides Tamil. The educated people also speak English and are multi-lingual.

== Demographics ==
Sri City forms part of Satyavedu and Varadaiahpalem Mandals of Tirupati District including some villages sharing border with Tiruvallur district of Tamil Nadu . It is part of the Satyavedu constituency for the Andhra Pradesh Legislative Assembly and the Tirupati constituency for the Lok Sabha. As per 2011 census the total population of the Satyavedu constituency is 2,77,010, with a literacy rate of 78.98, well over national rate of Literacy in India which stand at 74.04%.

== Social organizations ==
- Krea University
- Sankara Nethralaya (India)
- Institute of Financial Management and Research – IFMR (India)
- Indian Institute of Information Technology, Sri City
- Indian Rubber Manufacturers Research Association, Sricity - IRMRA
- Chinmaya Vidyalaya School (India)

== Special Economic Zone ==
The integrated township includes various zones: Industrial, Residential, Educational, Commercial and Recreational.

The Industrial Zone includes a Special Economic Zone (SEZ) for Export Oriented Industry and Domestic Tariff Zone (DTZ) for Domestic Industry. It is a business destination for global companies to establish Manufacturing, Services and Trading operations in India.

The SEZ is administered by Andhra Pradesh Industrial Infrastructure Corporation (APIIC) & Industrial Area Local Authority (IALA). The Government appointed officer controls the planning and building approval processes. A Commissioner appointed by the Government of India, Ministry of Commerce, administers the (SEZ) area.

The SEZ was designed by Jurong Consultants, Singapore, taking into account future dimensions of expansion.

== Transport ==
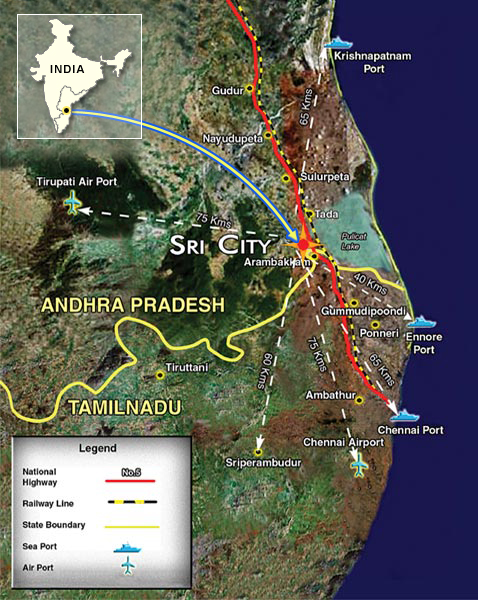
Sri City Map with distances

Sricity is located in close proximity to Asian Highway 45. The Tirupati Airport is the nearest airport (82 km) Tada and Arambakkam railway stations are nearest railway stations to Sricity. Chennai Port and Ennore Ports are the nearest port to the town. While, Krishnapatnam Port is located 100 km (62 mi) to the north of Sri City.

== See also ==
- Satish Dhawan Space Centre
