= Indian Institute of Information Technology, Sri City =

Technology institute in Andhra Pradesh, India

- College Logo
- Other name: IIITSRI
- Type: Public–private partnership
- Established: 2013; 13 years ago
- Accreditation: Institute of National Importance
- Affiliations: Ministry of Education (India)
- Director: M. V. Kartikeyan
- Academic staff: 126
- Administrative staff: 186
- Students: 2,400+
- Undergraduates: 1,560+
- Postgraduates: 560+
- Location: Sri City, Tirupati district, Andhra Pradesh, India; 44.112°N 87.913°W
- Campus: Urban
- Website: www.iiits.ac.in

The Indian Institute of Information Technology, Sri City is an educational institute of national importance located in Sri City, Tirupati district, Andhra Pradesh, India. It was created by the Ministry of Human Resource Development, Government of India, under a partnership with the Andhra Pradesh Government and Sri City consortium. The IIIT campus at Sri City is spread over 80 acres (32 ha). The institute is run by the Board of Governors of the IIIT Society. The Board of Governors includes representatives of MHRD, GoAP, and Industry Partners as well as eminent people from academia, industry, and civil society.

== History ==
The Indian Institute of Information Technology Sri City started its first batch in 2013 with IIIT Hyderabad as the mentor institute.

== Location ==
The Indian Institute of Information Technology is situated in Sri City, which is a planned integrated business city located 55 km (34 mi) north of Chennai on NH 16 along the border of Andhra Pradesh (AP) and Tamil Nadu (TN) states of India. Much of Sri City area is in Tirupati district. The Satish Dhawan Space Centre (SHAR), India's satellite/rocket launching center is located at Sriharikota, on the eastern side of Pulicat Lake which separates Sri City and the satellite launching station. Sri City is the largest industrial park in South India spread over 7,500 acres (3,000 ha) of land in close proximity to Chennai.

== Academic programs ==
The institute presently offers B.Tech in Computer Science and Engineering (CSE), B.Tech in Electronics and Communication Engineering (ECE), B.Tech in Artificial Intelligence and Data Science (AI & DS), PhD in ECE and CSE. It's CSE dept offers 2 M.Tech in Artificial Intelligence and Cyber Security. ECE Dept offers MTech in Cyber Physical Systems.

== Admissions ==
The admission to BTech programs in IIIT-S is through Central Seat allocation Board (CSAB). The students are allotted admission by CSAB based on their Joint Entrance Examination (JEE-Main) ranks. The Indian Institute of Information Technology, Sri City, Tirupati district, Andhra Pradesh is listed in the CSAB website under List of participating institutes in Other Central Government / State Government Funded Technical Institutes. Admission to M.Tech programs is via Graduate Aptitude Test in Engineering score and interview.
