= Tirupati district =

District in Andhra Pradesh, India

- District of Andhra Pradesh
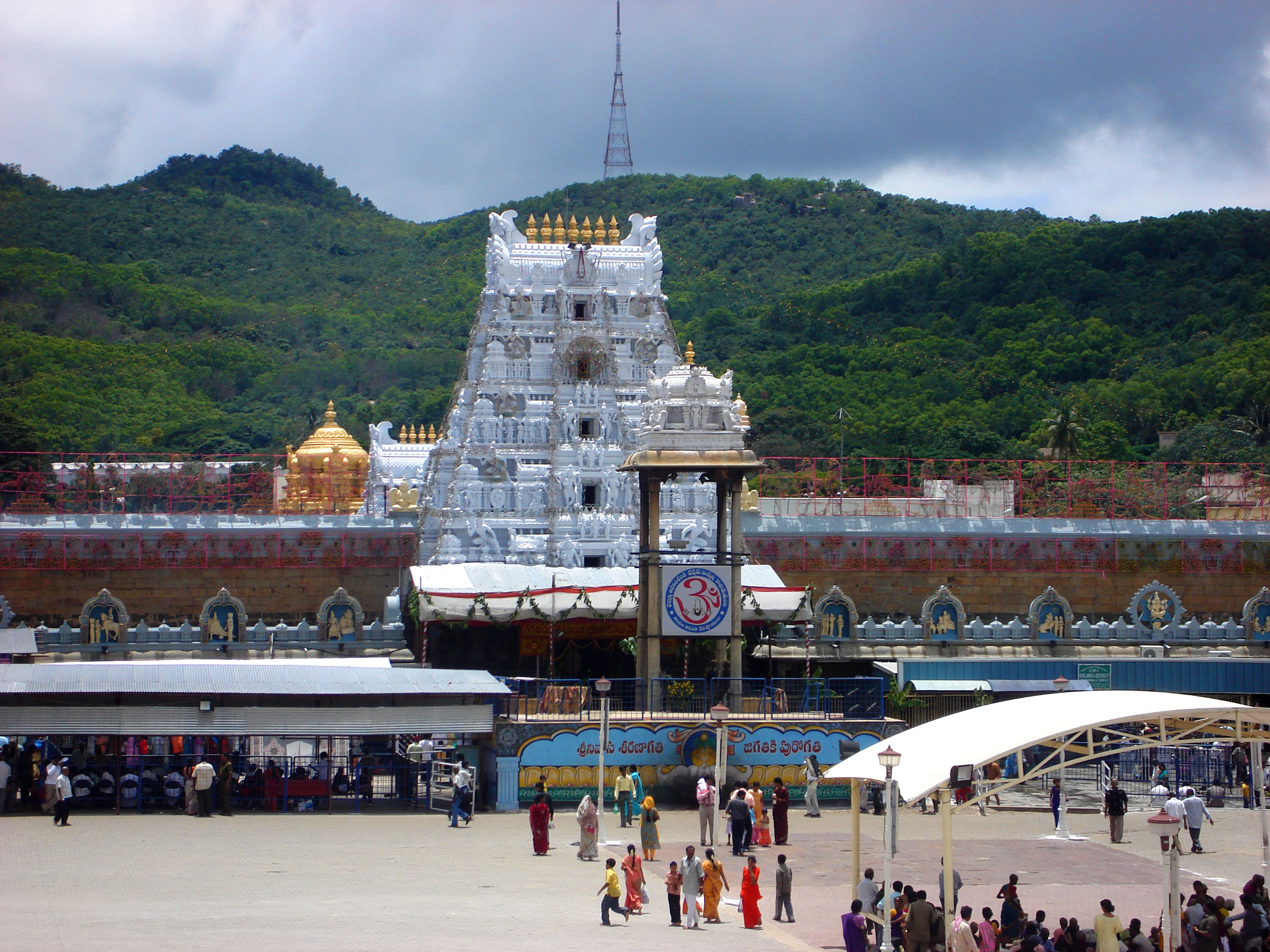
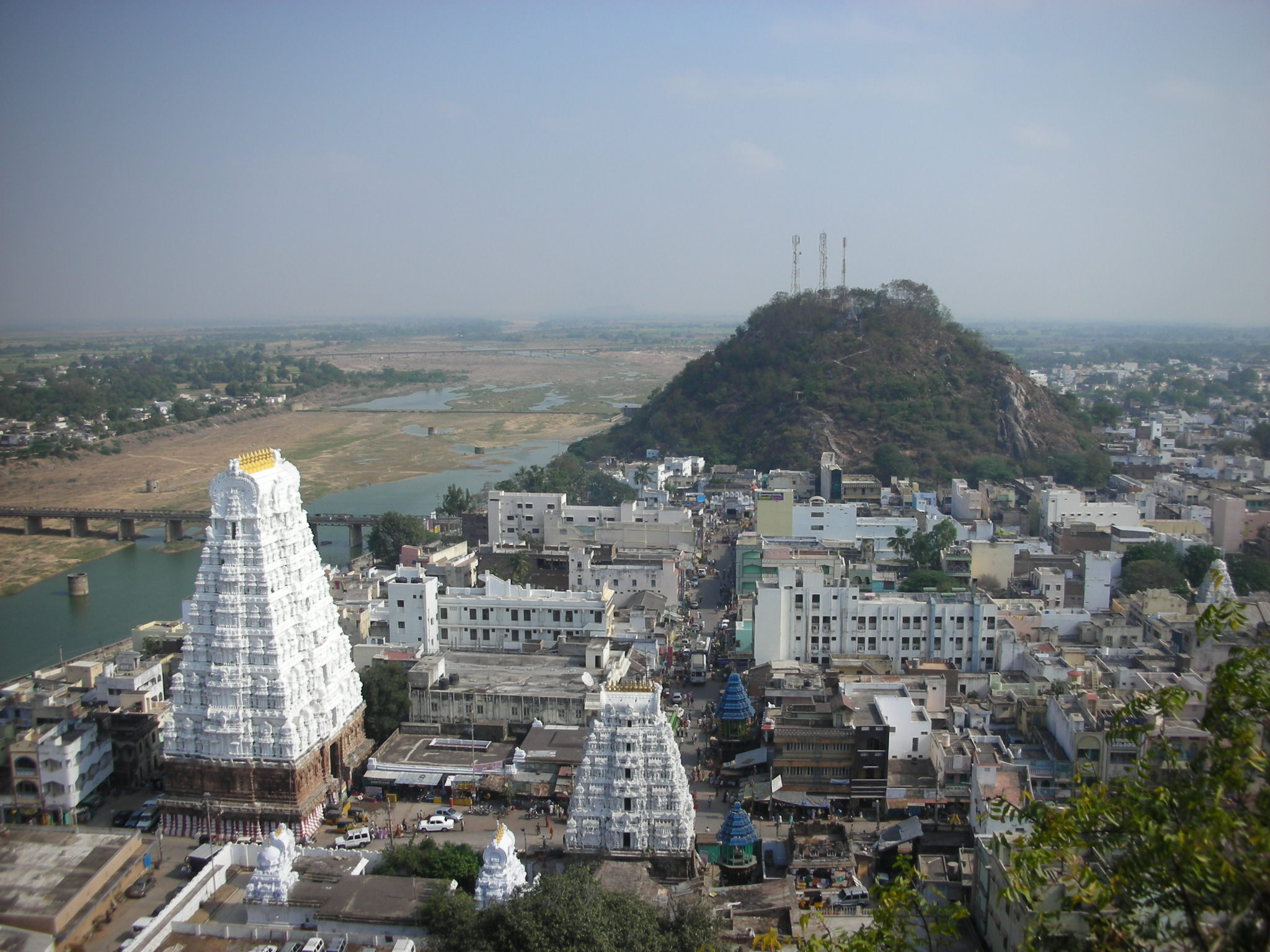
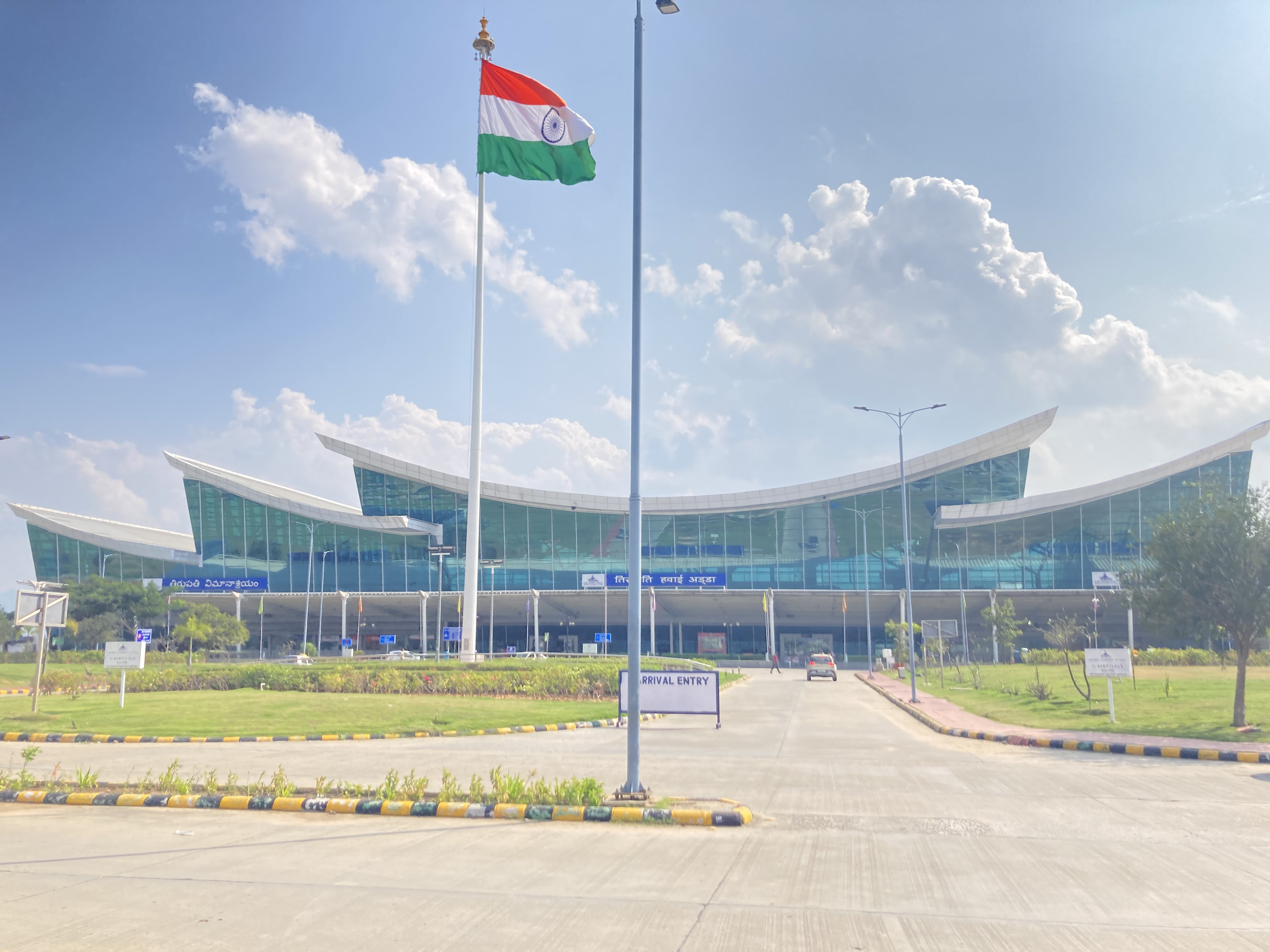
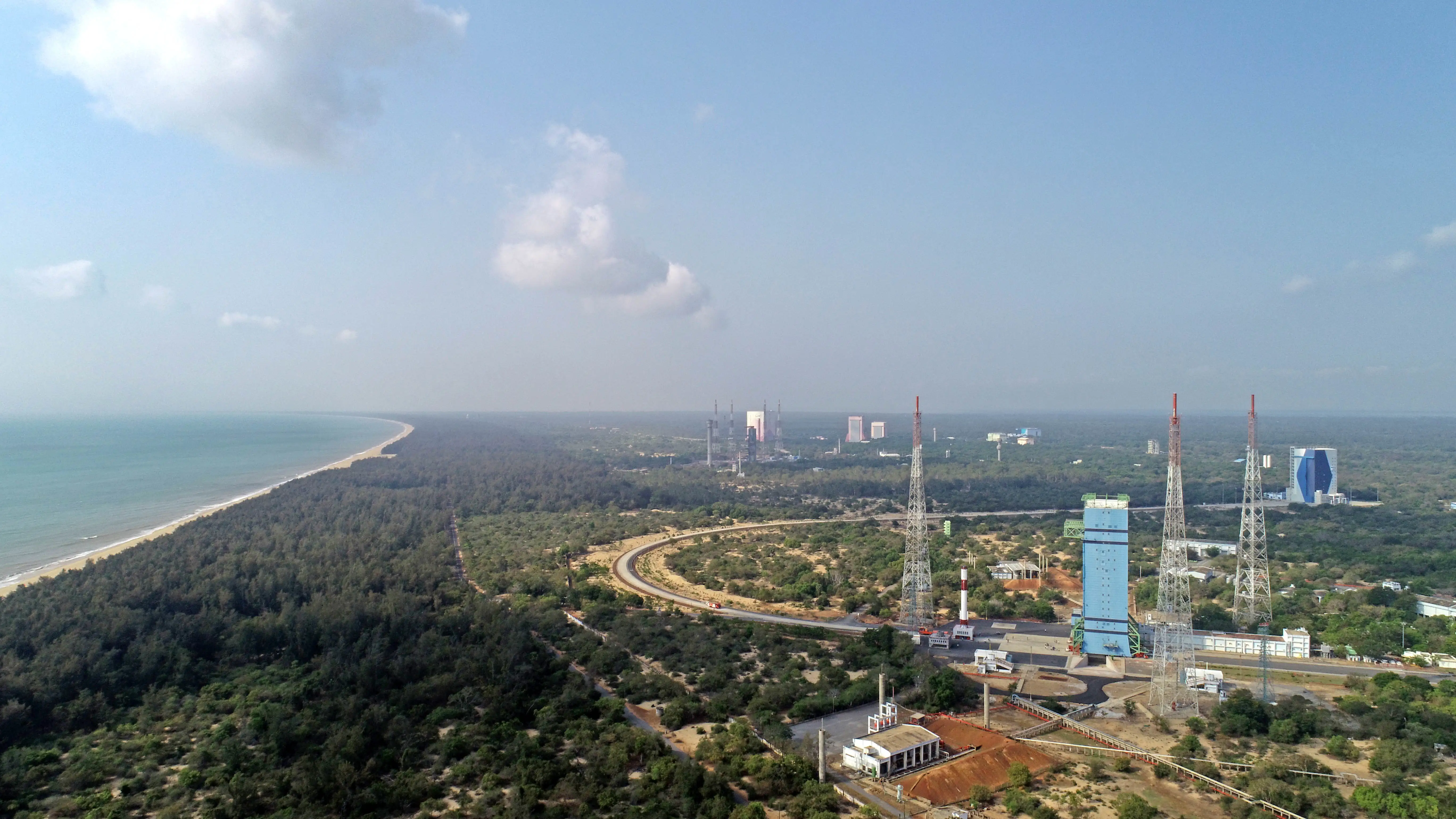
- Sri Venkateswara Temple, Tirumala Sri kalahasteeswara Temple, Srikalahasti Tirupati Airport, Tirupati Satish Dhawan Space Centre, Sriharikota

- Location of Tirupati district in Andhra Pradesh
- Interactive map of Tirupati district
- Coordinates: 13.632°N 79.423°E
- Country: India
- State: Andhra Pradesh
- Region: Rayalaseema
- Headquarters: Tirupati
- Largest City: Tirupati
- Formation: 4 April 2022; 4 Years ago
- Restructured: 31 Dec 2025; 1 Years ago
- Founder: Government of Andhra Pradesh
- Administrative divisions: List: 3 revenue divisions: Srikalahasthi; Sullurpet; Tirupati; 36 mandals; 5 municipalities; 806 gram panchayats; 1080 villages

Government
  - District collector: S.Venkateswar, IAS
  - SP: L.Subbarayudu, IPS
  - Lok Sabha constituencies: Lok Sabha list: Tirupati; Chittoor; Rajampet
  - Assembly: Assembly list: Chandragiri; Kodur; Nagari (Partially); Sathyavedu; Srikalahasti; Sullurpeta; Tirupati; Venkatagiri (Partially)

Area
  - Total: 9,174 km^{2} (3,542 sq mi)

Population (2011)
  - Total: 2,947,547
  - Rank: 1st (in Andhra Pradesh)
  - Density: 321.3/km^{2} (832.1/sq mi)

Languages
  - Official: Telugu
  - Minority: Tamil, Urdu

Demographics
  - Literacy: 86.97%
  - Sex ratio: 1000 Males /1000 Females
- Time zone: UTC+5:30 (IST)
- Postal Index Number: 517XXX, 524XXX
- Vehicle registration: AP-03, AP-26, AP-39 (former); AP–40 (from 4 April 2023)
- Coastline: 75 kilometres (47 mi)
- District LGD code: 752
- District abbreviation: TPT
- GDP (2022-23): ₹67,487 crore (equivalent to ₹740 billion or US$7.9 billion in 2026)
- Per capita income (2022–23): ₹251,704 (equivalent to ₹270,000 or US$2,900 in 2026)
- Website: tirupati.ap.gov.in

Tirupati district (/ˈtɪrʊpɒtɪ/) is one of the eight districts of Rayalaseema region in the Indian state of Andhra Pradesh. The district headquarters is located at Tirupati city. This district is known for its numerous historic temples, including the Hindu shrine of Tirumala Venkateswara Temple and Sri Kalahasteeswara temple. The district is also home to Satish Dhawan Space Centre (formerly Sriharikota Range), a rocket launch centre located in Sriharikota.

The district is an educational hub and has central and state universities and institutes including IISER Tirupati, IIT Tirupati, Sri Venkateswara University, National Sanskrit University, IIIT Sri City. Sri Venkateswara Institute of Medical sciences (SVIMS), Sri Padmavati Mahila Visvavidyalayam, Sri Venkateswara Vedic University, Sri Venkateswara Veterinary University, Sri Venkateswara Agriculture College, Sri Padmavati Women's Medical College, Sri Venkateswara Ayurvedic College, Sri Venkateswara College of Physiotherapy, etc The district is home to Sri City, one of the leading special economic zone (SEZ) in India.

== Etymology ==
The district derived its name from its main city, Tirupati. Tiru or(Thiru) means sacred and Pati or(Pathi) means god in Tamil.

== History ==
This region was part of Chittoor district. On 26 January 2022, Balaji district was proposed to be formed from parts of Chittoor and Nellore districts as one of the twenty-six districts. Based on public feedback, the proposed district was later renamed as Tirupati district. The district officially came into existence on 4 April 2022 with Gudur and Sullurupeta revenue divisions from Nellore district, and Tirupati revenue division from Chittoor district. The Srikalahasti revenue division was newly created. On 31 December 2025, Gudur revenue division was reorganised, with the mandals of Gudur, Kota, and Chillakur being merged into Nellore district. Where Penagalur, Chitvel, Pullampeta ,Obulavaripalle and Railway Koduru mandals of Annamayya district were merged into this district.

== Geography ==
Tirupati district is located between the northern latitudes of 13°21′54″ and 14°30′40″ and between the eastern longitudes 79°5′42″ and 80°4′10″, this district is located in Rayalaseema region in Andhra Pradesh. It is bordered by SPSR Nellore district, Kadapa district to the north, Chittoor and Annamayya districts to the west, Chittoor and Tiruvallur district of Tamil Nadu to the south and Bay of Bengal to the east.

The river Swarnamukhi flows through Tirupati, Srikalahasti, Naidupeta, Vakadu and join into the Bay of Bengal. The major part of Pulicat Lake is in this district.

== Flora and fauna ==
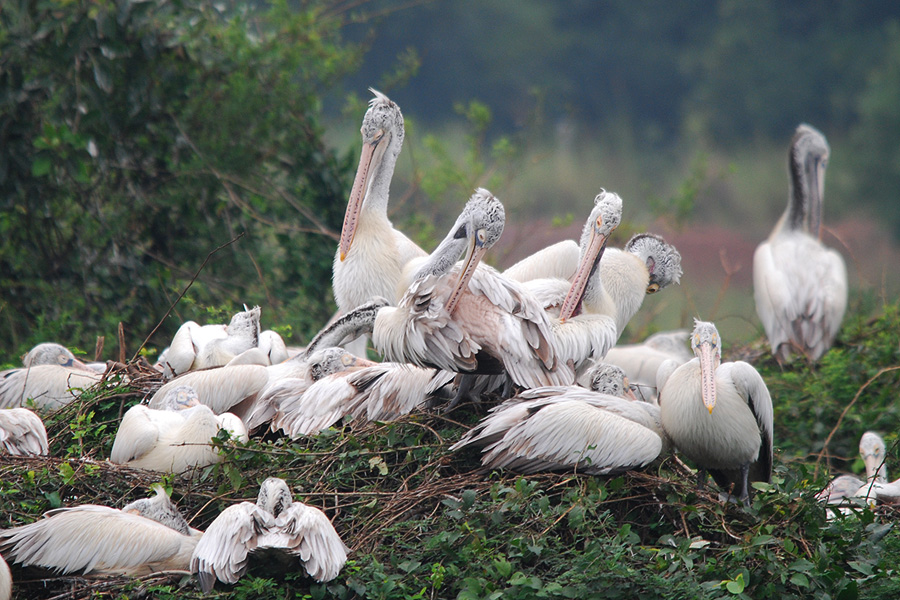
Spot-billed pelicans (Pelecanus philippensis) at Nelapattu Bird Sanctuary

Tirupati district hosts diverse ecosystems including forests, wetlands and hill ranges that support rich biodiversity. The district includes parts of the Sri Venkateswara Wildlife Sanctuary located in the Seshachalam hills. Important bird habitats such as Pulicat Lake Bird Sanctuary and Nelapattu Bird Sanctuary are also situated in the district and are known for migratory bird species.

Additionally, the Sri Penusila Narasimha Wildlife Sanctuary, located in neighbouring districts, lies close to the boundary of Tirupati district near Penagalur and Chitvel mandals.

== Demographics ==
Based on the 2011 census data, Tirupati district as of year 2025 had a population of 2,240,277, of which 781,194 (34.87%) lived in urban areas. It had a sex ratio of 1000 females per 1000 males. Scheduled Castes and Scheduled Tribes make up 516,319 (23.05%) and 157,676 (7.04%) of the population respectively. 93.94% of the population follow Hinduism, with a small minority follows Islam and Christianity.

Religions in Tirupati district updated for 2025 based on 2011 census data
Religion	Percent
Hinduism	93.94%
Islam	5.07%
Christianity	0.64%
Other or not stated	0.35%

78.28% of the population spoke Telugu, 10.25% Tamil and 10.42% Urdu as their first language.

Languages of Tirupati district updated for 2025 based on 2011 Census data
1. Telugu (78.28%)
2. Tamil (10.25%)
3. Urdu (10.42%)
4. Others (1.05%)

== Politics ==
The district is part of three parliamentary constituencies and seven assembly constituencies. The parliamentary constituency are Tirupati (Lok Sabha constituency) , Rajampet Lok Sabha constituency(partial) and Chittoor Lok Sabha constituency(partial). The assembly constituencies are given below.

Constituency number	Name	Reserved for (SC/ST/None)	Parliamentary constituency
167	Tirupati	None	Tirupati
121	Sullurpeta	SC	Tirupati
122	Venkatagiri(Venkatagiri,Dakkili,Balayapalli)	None	Tirupati
168	Srikalahasti	None	Tirupati
169	Satyavedu	SC	Tirupati
166	Chandragiri	None	Chittoor
170	Nagari(Puttur,Vadamalapeta)	None	Chittoor
127	Kodur	SC	Rajampet

== Administrative divisions ==
The district is divided into 3 revenue divisions: Srikalahasti, Sullurupeta and Tirupati, which are further subdivided into a total of 36 mandals, each headed by a sub-collector.

=== Mandals ===
The list of 36 mandals in Tirupati district, divided into 3 revenue divisions, is given below.

1. Srikalahasti revenue division
  1. Balayapalli
  2. Dakkili
  3. K.V.B.Puram
  4. Nagalapuram
  5. Narayanavanam
  6. Pichatur
  7. Renigunta
  8. Srikalahasti
  9. Thottambedu
  10. Venkatagiri
  11. Yerpedu
2. Sullurupeta revenue division
  1. Buchinaidu Kandriga
  2. Chittamur
  3. Doravarisatram
  4. Naidupeta
  5. Ozili
  6. Pellakur
  7. Satyavedu
  8. Sullurpeta
  9. Tada
  10. Vakadu
  11. Varadaiahpalem
3. Tirupati revenue division
  1. Chandragiri
  2. Chinnagottigallu
  3. Chitvel
  4. Koduru
  5. Obulavaripalle
  6. Pakala
  7. Penagalur
  8. Pullampeta
  9. Puttur
  10. Ramachandrapuram
  11. Tirupati Rural
  12. Tirupati Urban
  13. Vadamalapeta
  14. Yerravaripalem

== Cities and towns ==
The district has one municipal corporation at Tirupati city, and five municipalities at Srikalahasti, Naidupeta, Sullurpeta, Puttur and Venkatagiri. This district also has many census towns, 822 gram panchayats and 1107 villages.

Municipal bodies in Tirupati district
S.No.	Name	Civic status	Revenue division	Population (2011 census)
1	Tirupati	Municipal Corporation	Tirupati	2,95,323
2	Srikalahasti	Municipality Grade - 1	Srikalahasti	80,056
3	Puttur	Municipality Grade - 3	Tirupati	54,092
4	Venkatagiri	Municipality Grade - 3	Srikalahasti	52,688
5	Sullurupeta	Municipality Grade - 3	Sullurupeta	45,782
6	Naidupeta	Municipality Grade - 3	Sullurupeta	45,055
7	Railway Koduru	Nagarpanchayath	Tirupati	46,067

== Economy ==
STPI, Tirupati with a 10,000 sq.ft. facility for incubation was started in the year 2002. Sri City, a SEZ was started in the year 2008.

50,000-100,000 devotees visit The Sri Venkateswara Temple at Tirumala everyday, contributing to the tourism driven economy of the district.

== Transport ==
=== Roadways ===
NH 16, NH 71, NH 140, NH 716 and NH 565 pass through the district. Six lane express way connecting Tirupati and Bangalore via Chittoor is operational.

=== Railways ===
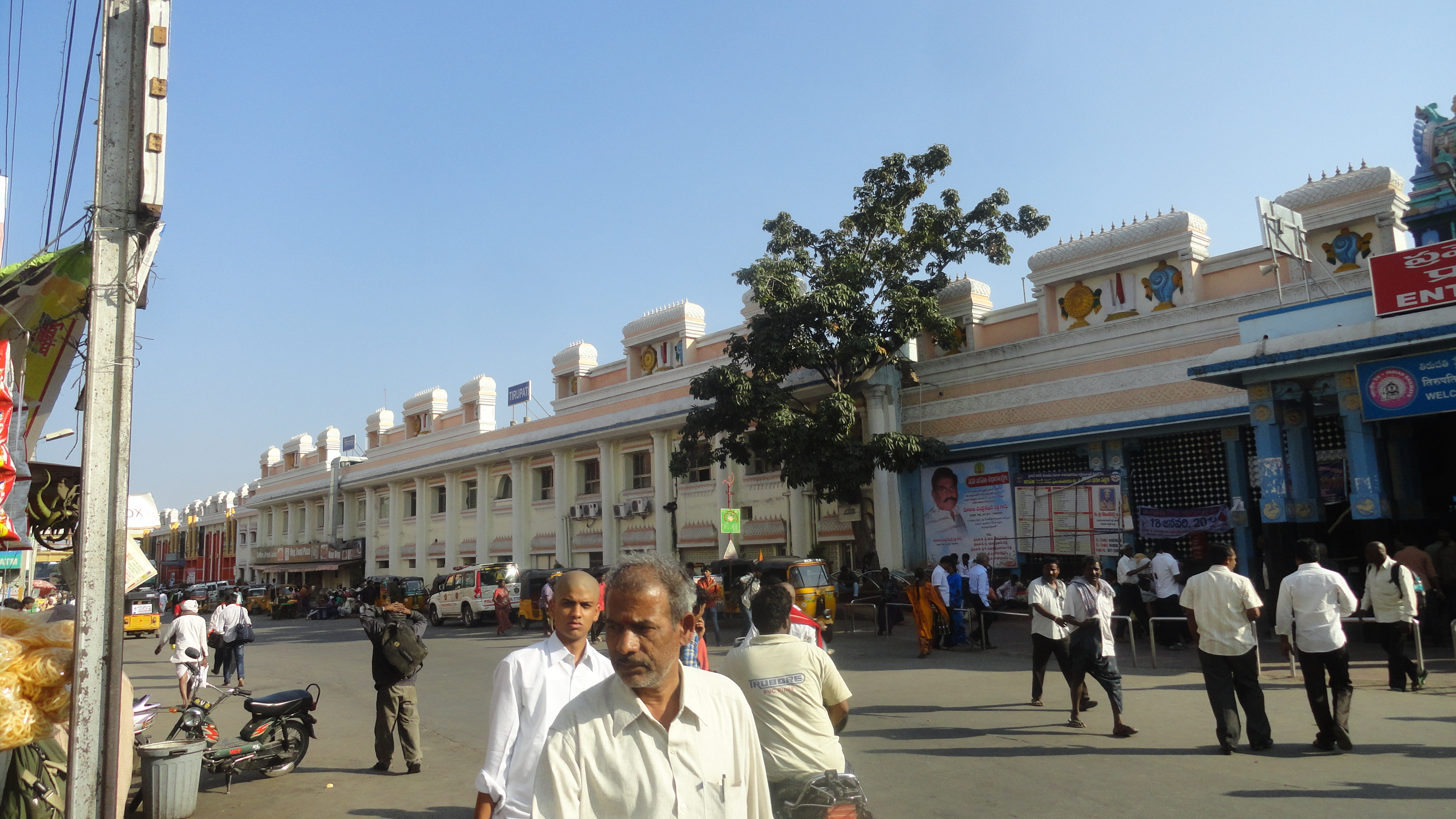
Tirupati main railway station

Tirupati railway station is among the busiest railway stations of India. It is on the Renigunta-Katpadi railway line. Renigunta Junction, Srikalahasti railway station, Sullurupeta railway station, Koduru railway station and Pakala Junction are major railway stations.

=== Airways ===
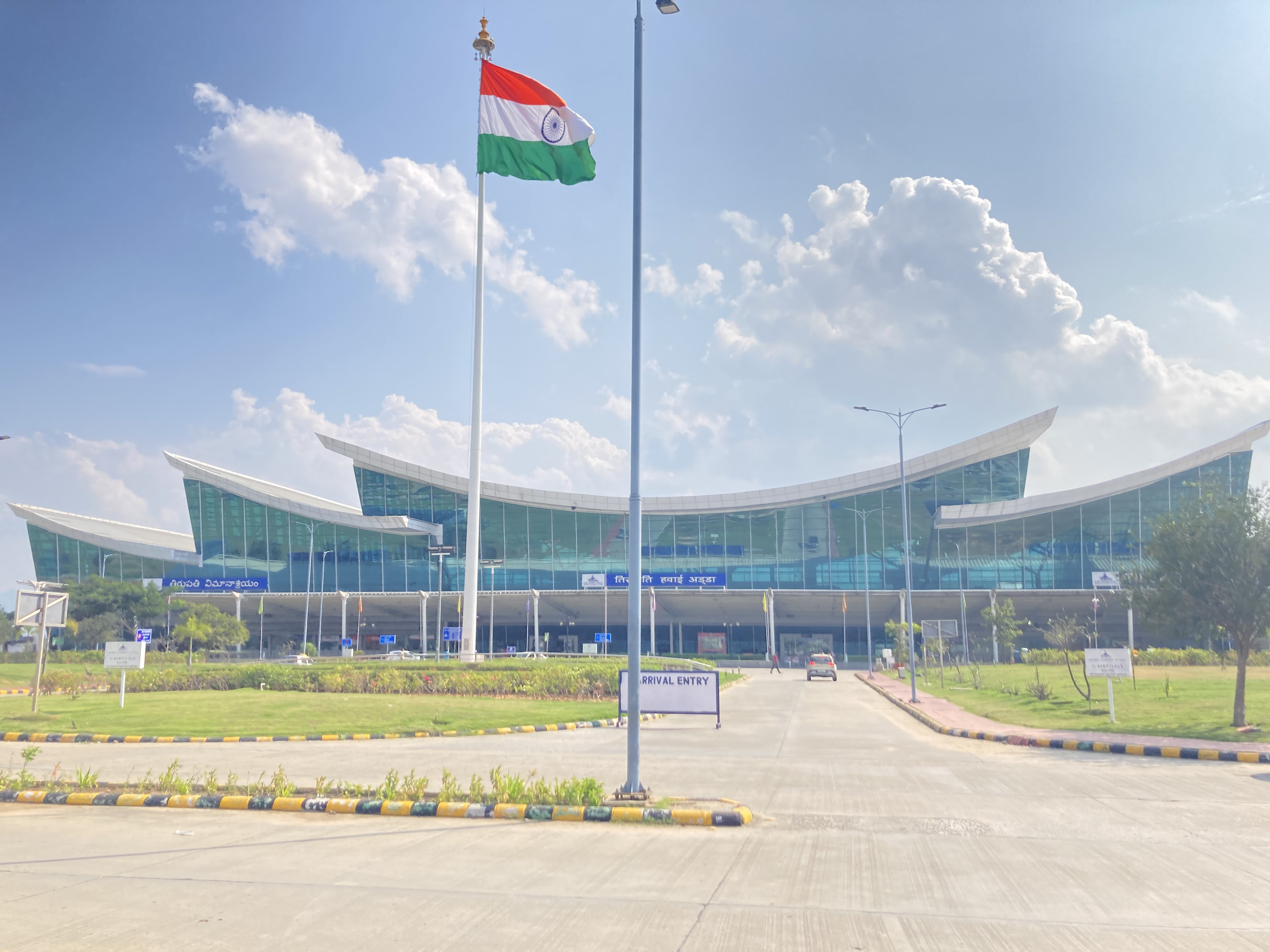
Tirupati Airport View

Tirupati Airport, the second-largest airport in Andhra Pradesh, is located 15 km (9.3 mi) from the Tirupati city centre and has daily flights to several domestic destinations. Tirupati Airport is upgraded to an international airport. The new international terminal was inaugurated on 22 October 2015.

=== Waterways ===
Dugarajapatnam Port is a proposed port in the district.

== Education ==
Sri Venkateswara University, Sri Padmavati Mahila Visvavidyalayam, National Sanskrit University, Sri Venkateswara Vedic University, Sri Venkateswara Veterinary University (SVVU) and Krea University are some of the universities in the district.

Several eminent institutes of excellence such as Government Institute of Ceramic Technology, National Institute of Ocean Technology, IIT Tirupati, IISER Tirupati, Indian Culinary Institute, Tirupati, Sri Venkateswara Institute of Medical Sciences (SVIMS), Sri Venkateswara Institute of Cancer Care and Advanced Research Tata Trusts - SVICCAR Hospital, Institute of Financial Management and Research, College of Horticulture, Railway Koduru and Indian Institute of Information Technology, Sri City are present in the district.

The National Atmospheric Research Laboratory of the Department of Space is at village Gadanki in Pakala mandal. The lab is involved in carrying out fundamental and applied research in Atmospheric and Space Sciences.

== Tourist attractions ==
Tirupati, Tirumala and Srikalahasti have famous Hindu temples. Tirumala, at a distance of 22 km from Tirupati, is abode of Venkateswara Swamy temple attracting 50000-100000 visitors. Pulicat Lake, a salt water lake spread over 500 Sq.Km, and Nelapattu Bird Sanctuary, famous for Spot-billed pelican, at a distance of 80 Km from Tirupati are popular environmental tourist attractions. Chandragiri Fort an 11th century fort, Satish Dhawan Space Centre, a space launch center are other places of interest.

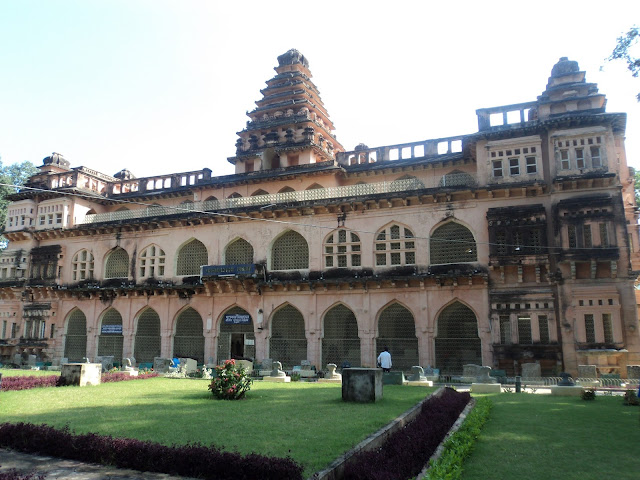
Raja Palace, Chandragiri Fort

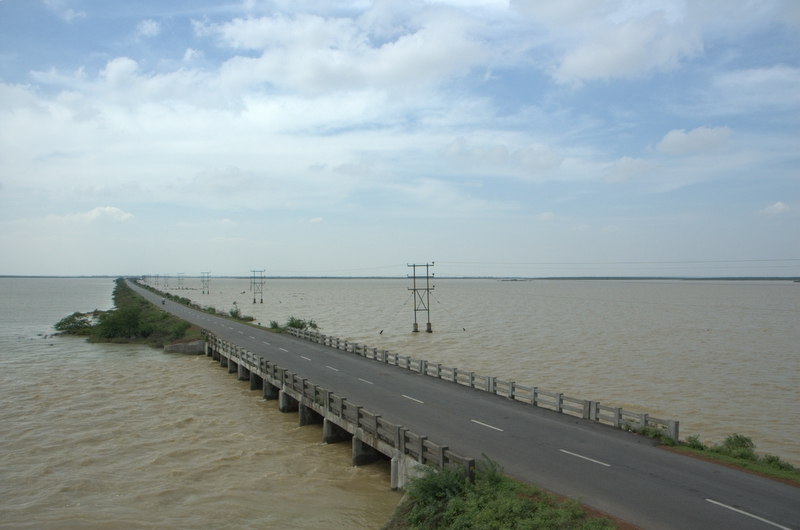
Pulicat Lake

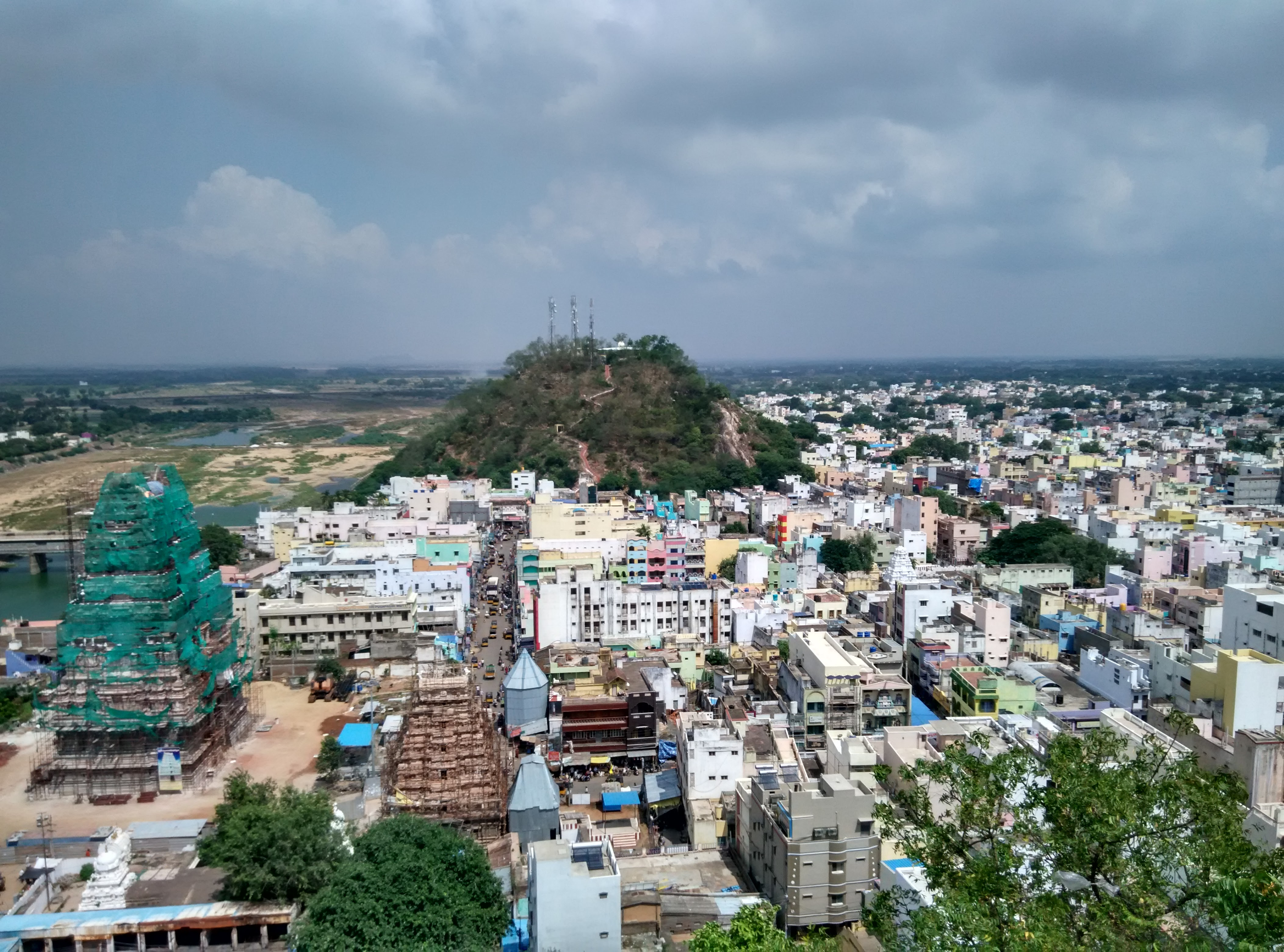
View of Srikalahasti from Kanappa Hill, Srikalahasti

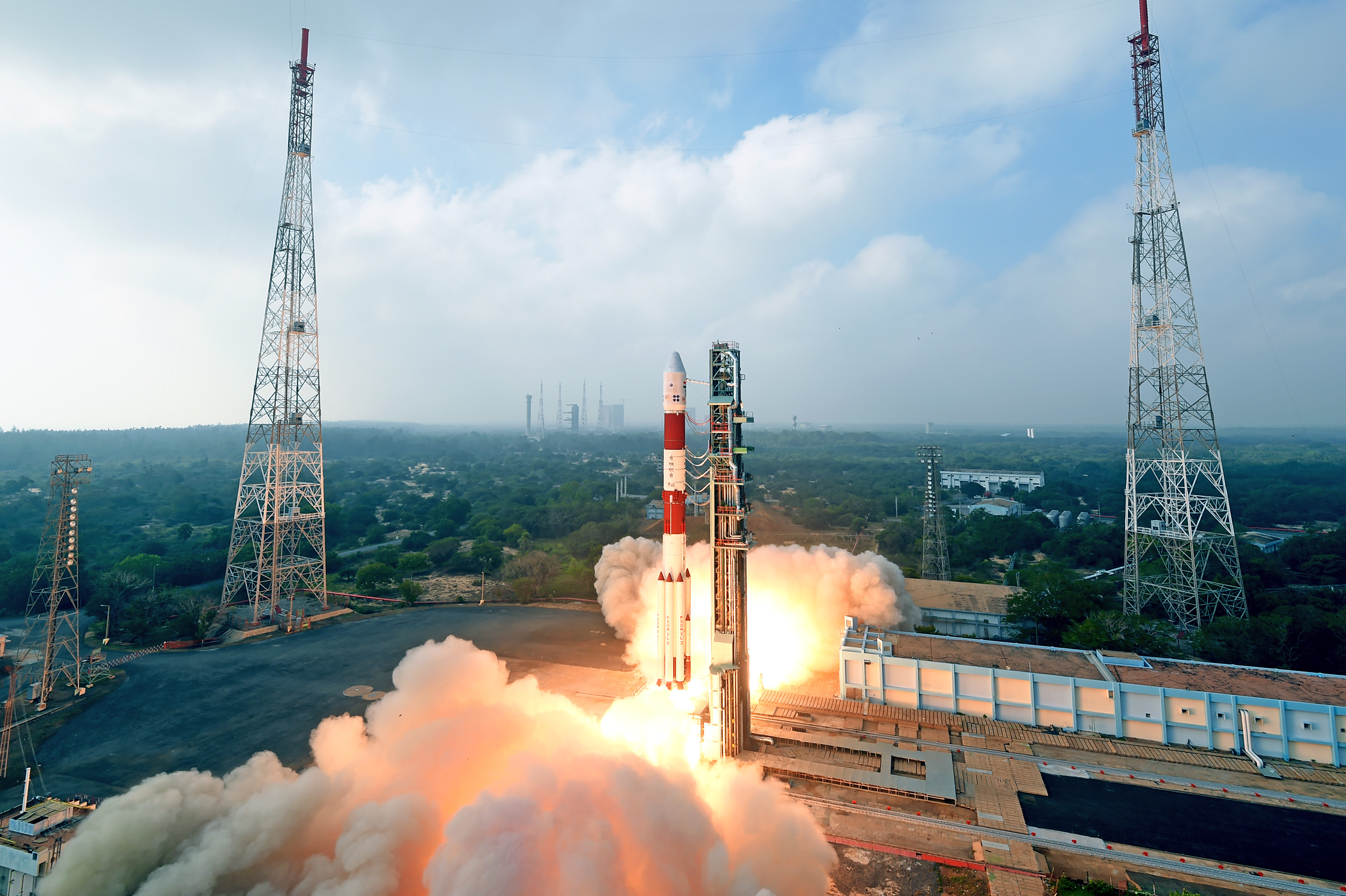
Liftoff from Satish Dhawan Space Centre at Sriharikota

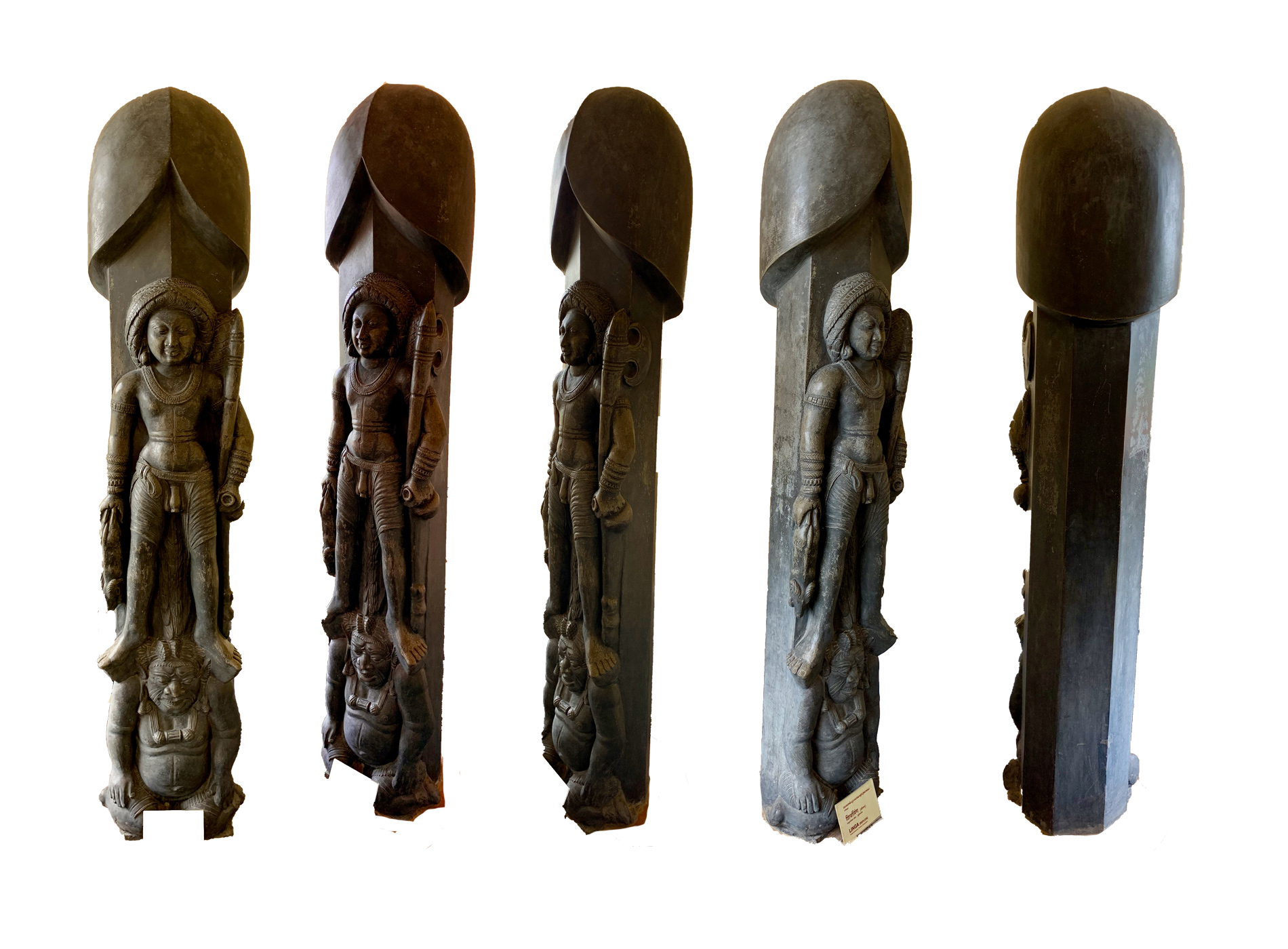
view of Gudimallam linga, a 19th century replica from the temple located in yerpedu mandal

== Notable people ==
1. M. A. Ayyangar born in Tiruchanur – First Deputy Speaker and Second Speaker of Lok Sabha
2. Madhurantakam Rajaram born in Damalcheruvu – Telugu short story writer, Winner of Sahitya Akademi Award in 1993
3. N. Chandrababu Naidu born in Naravaripalle – Chief Minister of Andhra Pradesh and Former Chief Minister of United Andhra Pradesh
4. N. Janardhana Reddy born in Vakadu – Former Chief Minister of United Andhra Pradesh
5. Raj Reddy born in Katur – Indian-American computer scientist and Winner of Turing Award in 1994
6. Roja Selvamani born in Bhakarapeta – Indian actress and Former Minister for Tourism,
  Culture and Youth Advancement of Andhra Pradesh
7. Shafi born in Chandragiri – Indian actor

Mandals of Tirupati district (Overpass-turbo)
