= National Highway 140 (India) =

National highway in India

National Highway 140
- Map of National Highway 140 in red

Route information
- Length: 61.128 km (37.983 mi)

Major junctions
- From: Chittoor
- To: Tirupati

Location
- Country: India
- States: Andhra Pradesh

Highway system
- Roads in India; Expressways; National; State; Asian
← NH 32	→ NH 79

National Highway 140 (NH 140) is a national highway in the Indian state of Andhra Pradesh. It starts near Chittoor and terminates near Tirupati. There are 6 main carriageways (3+3 lanes with a median in between), plus 2+2 lanes of service road. The tarmac is simply superb and ultra smooth with no potholes or undulations. The road has very few disturbances in the form of crossings or entry/exit points. Very safe to drive at permissible high speeds. If you love driving, this is a stretch of road you should not miss. It has a total length of 61.128 km (37.983 mi). It serves as a major transportation link between cities like Bengaluru and Vijayawada. Is tarah

== See also ==
- List of national highways in Andhra Pradesh
