= Tirulokanathar Temple, Thakkalur =

Hindu Temple in Puducherry

Tirulokanathar Temple is a Hindu temple dedicated to Shiva, one of the main deities of Hinduism. It lies in Thakkalur in Puducherry, India.

== Vaippu Sthalam ==
This temple is one of the shrines of the Vaippu Sthalams, built by Tamil Saivite Nayanars Appar and Sundarar.

== Presiding deity ==
The presiding deity in the garbhagriha, represented by the lingam, is known as Tirulokanathar. The Goddess is known as Dharmasamvardhini. Earlier they were called Svetharanyar and Anandavalli.

== Specialities ==
Lord Shiva can be found in many places. Among them are Idaimaruthu, Engoi, Ramacheram, Innambar, Emaperur, Thakkalur, Thalayalankadu, Kodumudi, Courtallam, Kollamputhur, Kottaru, and Kadambandurai.

== Architecture ==
The temple does not have rajagopura. It has an entrance and a compound wall. After entering from the east outer prakara, nandhi and bali peeta are found. Through the inner entrance, the garbhagriha of the presiding deity can be reached. It faces east, while the Goddess faces south. The temple is renovated . The shrine of Nataraja, known as Nataraja Sabha is also there. In the corner of the front mandapa, Bhairava and Chandra and in the outer prakara, Vinayaka, Visvanathar and Gajalakshmi are found.
