= Peringottukara =

Village in Kerala, India

Peringottukara Peringodante kara
- village
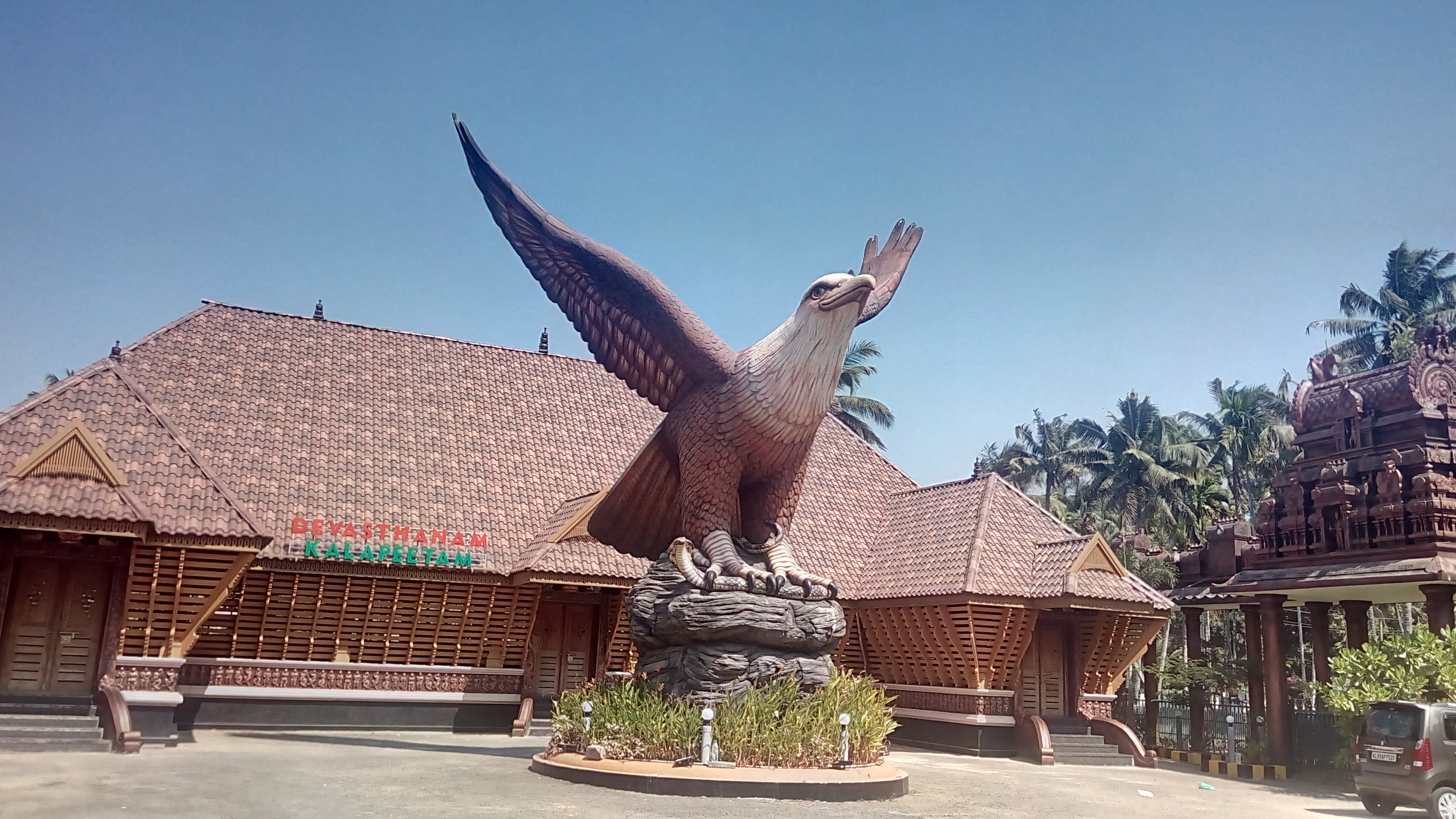
- Garuda statue at Peringottukara Devasthanam

- Location in Kerala, India Peringottukara (India)
- Coordinates: 10°25′42.36″N 76°7′15.47″E
- Country: India
- State: Kerala
- District: Thrissur

Languages
  - Official: Malayalam, English
- Time zone: UTC+5:30 (IST)
- PIN: 680565,680571
- Vehicle registration: KL-8(old).New KL-75
- Nearest city: Thrissur
- Lok Sabha constituency: Thrissur
- Climate: Equatarial (Köppen)

Peringottukara is a village in the western coastal side of India, located on the western side of Thrissur district, Kerala. The village is much famous for Vishnumaya Temples.

Peringottukara was visited by Sree Narayana Guru who founded Sree Somashekhara Temple, a Shiva temple in 1919.

== Temples ==
Peringottukara is the place where Peringottukara Ulsavam takes place. The temple committee also runs a Lower Primary School. The Peringottukara Ulsavam is considered as one of the major festivals of Thrissur. The ulsavam happens every year in Malayalam month Makaram on Aswati Nakshatra. People from various places get here for the blessings of Devi. Another temple is Thiruvanikavu Temple, a Bhagawati Temple.

There are Chathan Seva temples at Peringottukara, such as Avanangattilkalari Vishnumaya Temple, and Devasthanam, Kanadi Kavu, among these Avanangattu Kalari is the biggest and oldest Temple. A Shiva Parvathy Vishnumaya Terracotta Statue in Kerala is situated in front of the Peringottukara Devasthanam, its height is 52 ft.

== Town ==
Peringottukara is divided into four segments such as Vadakkummuri, Thekkummuri, Padinjattummuri, and Kizhakkummri. Peringottukara village includes kizhakkumuri, vadakkumuri, and peringottukara center.

Peringottukara village has main two junctions, the four-way junction, and three-way junction. The four-way junction has a petrol pump, three-star hotel, hypermarket, nationalized bank, co-operative banks, and grocery stores. Peringottukara 3-way junction also has the same facilities. Peringottukara holds two Cinema theaters, a supermarket, a high school.

== Visit of Sree Narayana Guru 1903 ==
In 1903, K. S. Krishna Thandan invited Sree Narayana Guru and N. Kumaran Asan to Peringuttukara. On 23 January, they reached Karattuparambil Tharavadu, Krishna Thandan's residence. On the next day of his visit, he demolished the Bhagavathi Temple where the family members worshiped. That was a message to those who want animal sacrifice. In this temple Every year they used to sacrifice more than 200 Roosters during the time of festivals. (K.R Achuthan M.A B.L, author of the first history of Somasekhara Temple). After this historic demolishing of bad faith, Guru called for a meeting. N.Kumaran Asan presided over the meeting and in this meeting a society was formed to spread Guru's principles "One Caste, One Religion, One God". The name of this society was Sree Narayana Guru Smaraka Samajam. K.S. Krishna Thandan and Thandassery Kunjayyappan were the promoters of the society. After staying a week at Karattuprambil Tharavadu, Guru and his disciple Asan went back to Moothakunnam after visiting other Thiyya Tharavadus like Thandassery (Kizhakkummury), Adipparambil (Valappad), Pokkanchery, Thachappally (Engandiyur) and Vazhoor.

After three months, Guru sent his first disciple Shivalinkadas to Peringottukara. According to K.R. Achuthan it happened the following July. Sivalinkadas stayed at Krishna Thandan's residence and started the collection of funds to construct an Ashramam (the holy place where Hindu Saints live). The construction of Sree Narayana Asrama was completed in 1906. During this time Guru visited Peringottukara again and again and helped people to free themselves from castism and untouchability.

== Ashram ==
After the opening of Sree Narayana Ashrama, Guru appointed scholars of different disciplines as teachers to this Ashrama. Among them were P. Govindanassan, Swamy Shivalingadas and Swamy Bhodhananda Giry. There was a long array of disciples studied at Sree Narayana Ashrama. The important personalities were Sadguru Malayala Swamy (founder of Sri Vyasashram at Yerpedu, Andhra Pradesh) and Swamy Ramananda (founder of Siddhavaidyasramam Kurkkanchery, Thrissur).

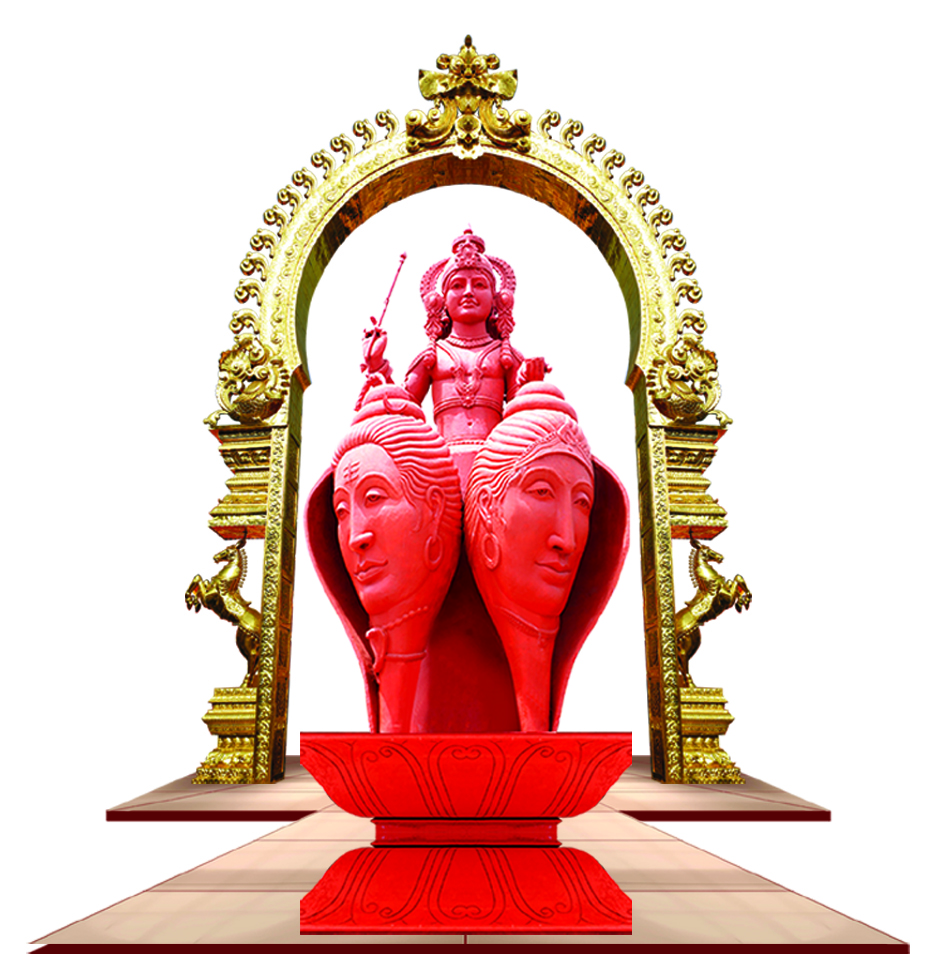
Holy union of Siva and Parvathy in a Valampirishankh

The idea of Swamy Bodhananda to destroy casteism and Brahmin supremacy was quite different from Sree Narayana Guru. He was against religious beliefs and opposed idol worship. The humanism he practiced was self-purification of thought and action. The First Social Reformer introduced a common dining table, common staying homes, common school rooms and inter-caste marriage system for Dalits in India was Swamy Bodhananda Giri. Later, Sahodaran Ayyappan Accepted these principles as his life mission.

Bodhananda Swami organized an armed organization for crushing untouchability castism and Brahmin supremacy. The name of this organization was Dharmabhadasena. It fought three decisive battles against Brahmins. They were Cheloor Kalapam at Thriprayar (1912), Arattupuzha Poooram Kalapam at Peringottukara and Chirakkal(1918) Thanissery Kalapam (1918) at Thanissery near Irinjalakkuda. Bengaly Asan, Thoppiyil Bahuleyan, and Ottappalam Krishnan were leaders and heroes.

In the British ruled Cochin state, Peringottukara was the cultural capital of Thiyyas and other backward people. It all started under the leadership of Sree Narayana guru.
