= Swami Vidya Prakashananda Giri =

Hindu guru (1914–1998)

- స్వామి విద్యాప్రకాశానంద గిరి
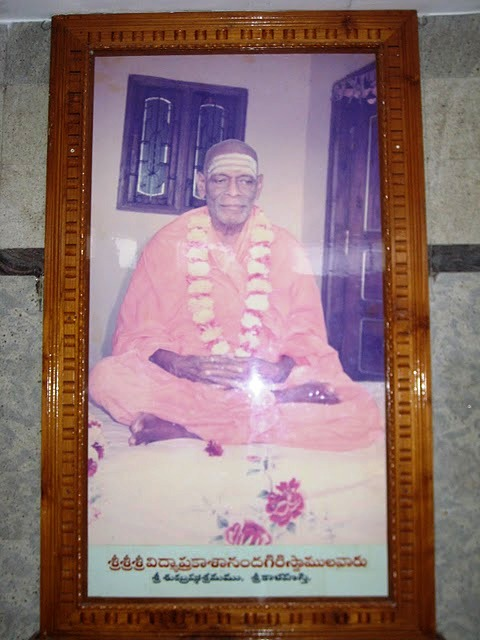
- Born: Tunuguntla Ananda Mohan; 13 April 1914; Bandaru, Madras Presidency, British India (now in Andhra Pradesh)
- Died: 10 April 1998 (aged 84); Srikalahasti, Chittoor district, Andhra Pradesh
- Education: B.A (Noble College, Machilipatnam), Hindi Kovida (Varanasi)
- Occupations: spiritual guru, writer
- Parents: Tunuguntla Ramaswamy (father); Suseela (mother)

Swami Vidya Prakashananda Giri (13 April 1914 – 10 April 1998), born Ananda Mohan, was an Indian spiritual Guru from Andhra Pradesh. He was a disciple of Malayala Swamy. He was the founder of Sri Sukabrahmashram in Srikalahasti. His commentary on Bhagavad Gita named Geetha Makarandam is one of the prominent works in spiritual literature.

== Life ==
Swami Vidya Prakashananda was born Tunuguntla Ananda Mohan in a Telugu family in Machilipatnam, Krishna district, Madras Presidency of British India on 14 April 1914. His parents were Tunuguntla Ramaswamy, Suseela. Ramaswamy was a lawyer before turning into a devoted social servant. Ananda Mohan completed his matriculation in Vijayawada at the age of 13 years. He completed his B.A from Noble college in 1933. Later he studied Hindi in Varanasi for a few years and earned a certification. Once Swami Asangananda Giri (Malayala Swamy) of Sri Vyasashram at Yerepdu, visited their home in Vijayawada. He felt happy about the way the pious couple leading their life and asked Ramaswamy to send one of his children to his ashram, so that he could impart spiritual knowledge to him. Without any further thoughts, Ramaswamy chose his third child, Ananda Mohan, who clearly showed the inclination towards spirituality since his childhood. After completing his Hindi Kovida certification in Varanasi, he was a in a dilemma whether to go for higher studies or go back to his guru's ashram and start ascetic life. One day, when he was crossing the Ganga river, he found the Bhagavad Gita written on the old palm leaves. This incident inspired him to propagate the teachings of the Gita for his lifelong.

On 17 May 1936 he entered Vyasashram, Yerpedu established by his Guru, Malayala Swamy. For 12 years, he practiced austerities like eating only raw food and remaining silent for an year. Every day, he explained the Gita and other spiritual works to the people of the ashram. He also translated some books like Yoga Vasistha into Telugu.

== Sri Sukabrahmashram ==
He established Sri Sukabrahmashramam on the banks of Swarnamukhi river on the outskirts of the temple town Srikalahasti. This ashram not only help people in their path of spirituality, but also help in conducting various social service activities. The clinic inside the ashram premises provides free health checkup for the poor and the needy. They also offer free cataract surgeries to the nearby villagers who can't afford it. The ashram also runs a free yoga camp for those who want to learn.

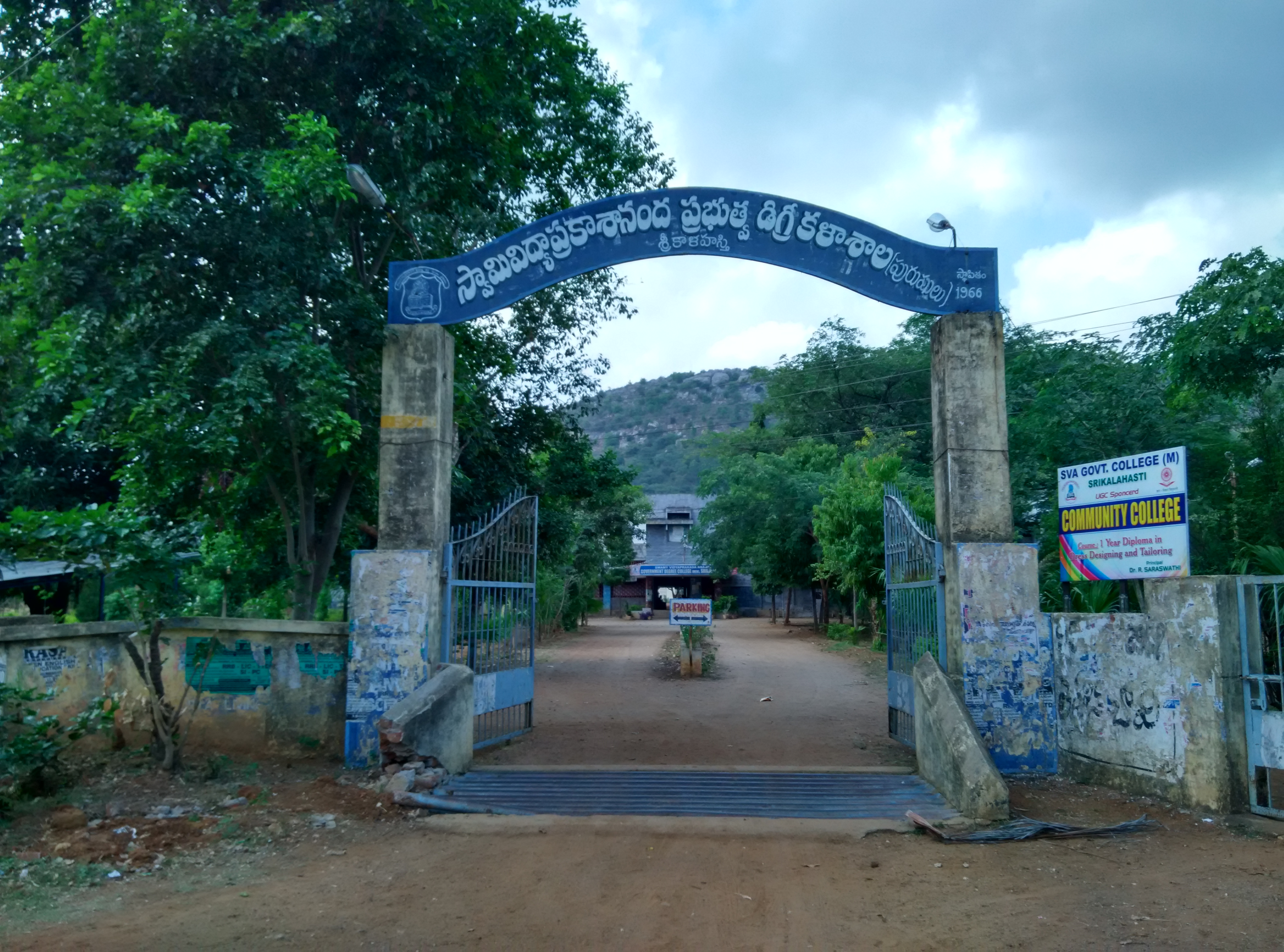
Entrance of Swami Vidyaprakasananda Degree College

He was instrumental in starting the first government degree college in Srikalahasti. The college is named after him.

== Works ==
While he was at Sri Vyasashram he translated Yoga Vasishta into Telugu. He also translated Dhammapada, a Buddhist work from Hindi to Sanskrit and Telugu. Gita Makarandam was his most notable work. This is a commentary on Bhagavad Gita which he first wrote in Telugu. Later this book is translated into Tamil, English, Kannada, Hindi etc.

He co-authored Vasishta Rama Samvadam (Dialogue between Vasishta and Rama) with Swami Nirvikalpananda which is published by Sri Ramakrishna Math, Hyderabad.

Metro man, E. Sreedharan mentioned that he referenced the English translation of the book Gita Makarandam written by Vidya Prakasananda.

== Bibliography ==
- Samudrala, Lakshmanaiah (1992), Biography of Swami Vidyaprakashananda Giri, Srikalahasti: Sri Sukabrahmashram
