= Kuttichathan (disambiguation) =

Kuttichathan is a demon in Malabar demonology.

Kuttichathan or Kuttichaathan may also refer to:

- Kuttichaathan (film), a 1975 Indian Malayalam film
- My Dear Kuttichathan, India's first 3D film, a 1984 Indian Malayalam fantasy film also released under the title Kuttichathan
- Hello Kuttichathan (2008) and Hello Kuttichathan 2 (2009), programs broadcast by Asianet
- Kuttichathan Theyyam, a theyyam performed in North Kerala, India
