= Anjimedu =

Coordinates: 13.675°N 79.580°E

Anjimedu is a village panchayat in the Indian state of Andhra Pradesh, Tirupati district, and is located between the temple towns of Tirupati and Sri kalahasti. It is 21 km from Tirupati and 16 km from Sri kalahasti. It comes under Yerpedu mandal.
