= Malayala Swamy =

South Indian Spiritual Leader

Personal life
- Born: Velappa; March 29, 1885 Guruvayur, Kerala
- Died: July 12, 1962 (aged 77) Yerpedu
- Parents: Kariappa (father); Notthiyamma (mother)

Religious life
- Religion: Hinduism
- Founder of: Sri Vyasashram
- Philosophy: Anushtana Vedanta

Religious career
- Teacher: Sivalinga Swamy
- Disciples: Sri Vidya Prakasananda Giri Swamy

Malayala Swamy (1885–1962) was a Hindu religious leader, and a social reformer. He dismissed the myth that Vedas and other scriptures are only for a particular section of the society and encouraged common man to gain spiritual knowledge. He also encouraged women education. He was the founder of Sri Vyasashrama in Yerpedu, Andhra Pradesh. He influenced Swami Vidya Prakashananda Giri, his famous disciple who established Sri Sukabrahmashrama at Srikalahasti.

Malayala Swamy extensively traveled in and out of Andhra Pradesh, where there is a Telugu speaking crowd to propagate the ancient Hindu wisdom by conducting Sanatana Vedanta Jnana Sabhas, Omkara Satra Yagas lasting for a week, Chaturmasya Vrathas lasting for four months, installed idols in various temples, inaugurated ashrams, laid foundations to several constructions, opened monasteries, etc. in the service of god.

== Life ==
He was born to a traditional Ezhava Hindu couple Kariappa, and Notthiyamma in Engadiyur village near Guruvayur, Kerala. His birth name is Velappa. He studied various Hindu scriptures and toured various religious places in India. He finally reached Tirumala and did penance near Gogarbham. After doing penance for 12 years he settled at a place near Yerpedu, where he started an ashram in the name of Sage Vyasa. Since he spoke Malayalam only in the initial days, devotees named him Malayala Swamy. After he formally renounced the world, he also got a name Asangananda Swami, but he preferred the name Malayala Swamy.

== Vyasashram ==
He established Sri Vyasashram in 1926 near Yerpedu which is located in between two famous temple towns Tirupati, and Srikalahasti. His most popular book is Sushka Vedanta Tamo Bhaskaram (The sunlight of truth, dispelling the darkness of empty metaphysics) which was published in December 1919.

== Books ==
Though he was basically from Malayali origin, he learned to speak Telugu. His Telugu speaking disciples wrote the books when he was dictating them in Telugu. He launched a monthly spiritual magazine called Yadartha Bharati in February 1927 to propagate spiritual knowledge expounded by ancient Hindu Rishis. Here are some of his publications.

- Sushka Vedanta Tamo Bhaskaram
- Eeshwara Krupa
- Omkaram
- Karma Siddhantam
- Gurubhakti Prabhavam
- Gruhasthashrama Dharmam
- Jeevanmukti
- Dharmopanyasamulu (5 parts)
- Dhyanamrutham
- Dharma Setuvu
- Nirvana Nilayam
- Nirvijna Yogasiddhi
- Brahmacharyam
- Brahmavidya
- Mayanu Mayamu Cheyuta

== Bibliography ==
- Satyanarayana, P (2017). Sri Sadguru Malayala Swamy (PDF). Tirumala: Tirumala Tirupati Devasthanams.
