= Kanadikavu Shree Vishnumaya Kuttichathan Swamy temple =

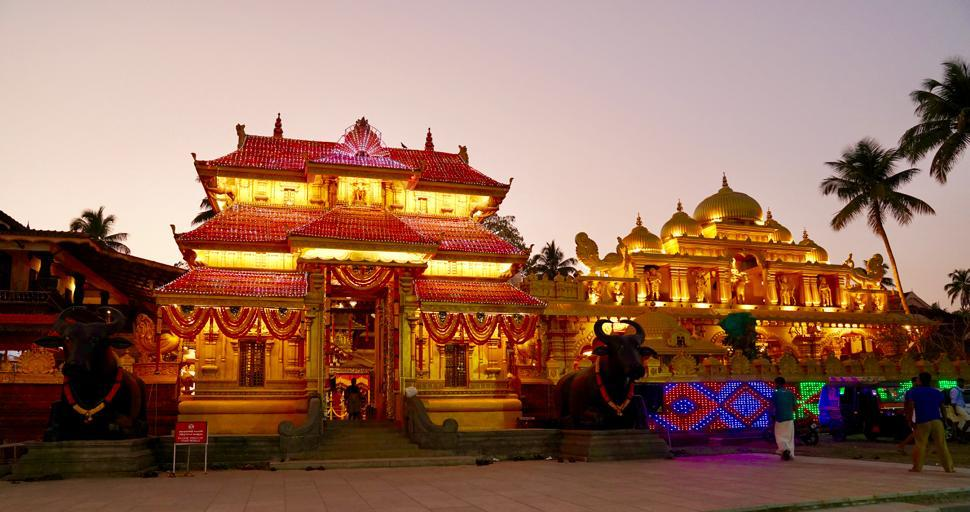

Religion
- Affiliation: Hinduism
- District: Thrissur
- Deity: VishnuMaya

Location
- Location: Peringottukara
- State: Kerala
- Country: India
- Interactive map of Kanadikavu Shree Vishnumaya Kuttichathan Swamy temple
- Coordinates: 10°25′20″N 76°7′55″E

Architecture
- Type: Fusion of Kerala Architecture and Tamil Architecture

Website
- Official website

The Kanadikavu Shree Vishnmaya Kuttichathan Swamy temple is the oldest Vishnumaya temple located 20 km southwest of Thrissur, Peringottukara, in Kerala, India.

The main deity of the temple is shree Vishnumaya and 390 Kuttichathans. Brahmasree Vishnubharatheeya Swami, the Spiritual Guru and the Madathipathi is the chief priest of KanadiKavu.

== Main deities ==
The main deity of the temple is Shree Vishnumaya Kuttichathan. The sub deities here are Bhadrakali, Bhuvanaeswari, Kukshikalpam and 390 Kuttichathans, Nagaraja, Nagayakshi and Brahmarakshas as a couple.

== History ==
Koonamuthappan, who was a sage, realized that for the well being of whole humanity they needed the presence and blessings of a powerful and easy-to-please deity. So he undertook a severe penance to please the deity of his family. The Goddess soon appeared before him. Koonamuthappan requested the Goddess to give him the Mantram that would enable him to please and possess Chathan Swamy, the son of Shree Parameswara. Pleased at her devotee's penance the Goddess told him the Moola Mantram to make Chathan appear before him and the Dhyana Mantram to worship him every day. He then went to the Himalayas and following the advice of the Nga Sages, entered into a severe penance. Vishnumaya Kuttichathan Swami soon appeared before him, and he returned to Peringottukara with the deity. After reaching Peringottukara, he consecrated and installed Vishnumaya Chathan Swamy at the place where now Kanadi Family exists.

=== Roopakkalam ===
Roopakkalam is the concept of Vishnulokam. The ritual of Roopakalam is usually carried out in connection with the annual festival of Thiruvellattu, in the Malayalam month of Makaram, in the Vishnumaya temples of Kerala. This is something akin to the Kalamezhuthu in the temples dedicated to Serpent Gods in Kerala.The beautiful and fascinating Roopakalam is basically a form of ritual or offering to lord Vishnumaya, wherein enchanting and colorful figures of the lord and sometimes, of his trusted friend and ally Karimkutty, is drawn on the ground using multi coloured herbal and organic powders. After the Roopakalam is drawn, a family member who is a priest performs puja as per the tantric rites and invokes the lord into the Roopakalam. This is followed by a sacred ritual dance by the priest around the kalam, to the accompaniment of wild music. The dancer then erases the kalam using coconut palm leaves. The colored powders are subsequently distributed to the devotees after the ritual.

=== Main offerings to the deity ===
The main offerings made by the devotees include Roopakalam, Chuttuvilakku, Niramala, Brahmavellattu Karmam, Veethu, Guruthi, Divasapooja and Pushpanjali.

== Festivals ==
Kerala, specially Thrissur is a land of festivals, where people from different religions coexist harmoniously and celebrate festivals wholeheartedly throughout the year. As the same, Kanadikavu is called for the festivals it celebrates.

=== Thiravellattu Mahotsavam ===
The day of the oracle of Vishnumaya in the Malayalam month of Makaram, is with Thiravellattu Mahotsavam. In the month of Midhunam three days starting with the star Uthram are meant as the festival in connection with the Consecration Day.

=== Thottampattu festival ===
Thottampattu Festival is to please Bhuvaneswary who is in the form of mother to Lord Vishnu Maya. Bhuvaneswary is the family deity of Kanady family who was chiefly instrumental for the arrival of Vishnumaya to Peringotukara village. On the day of Thottampattu, Devi is brought out from the Sreekovil where idol of Devi is created as Kalam. Then hymns are chanted about the glory of the Devi. Hundreds of devotees find it an apt occasion to visit the temple.
