= Kulithalai =

Kulithalai Kulittalai
- Town
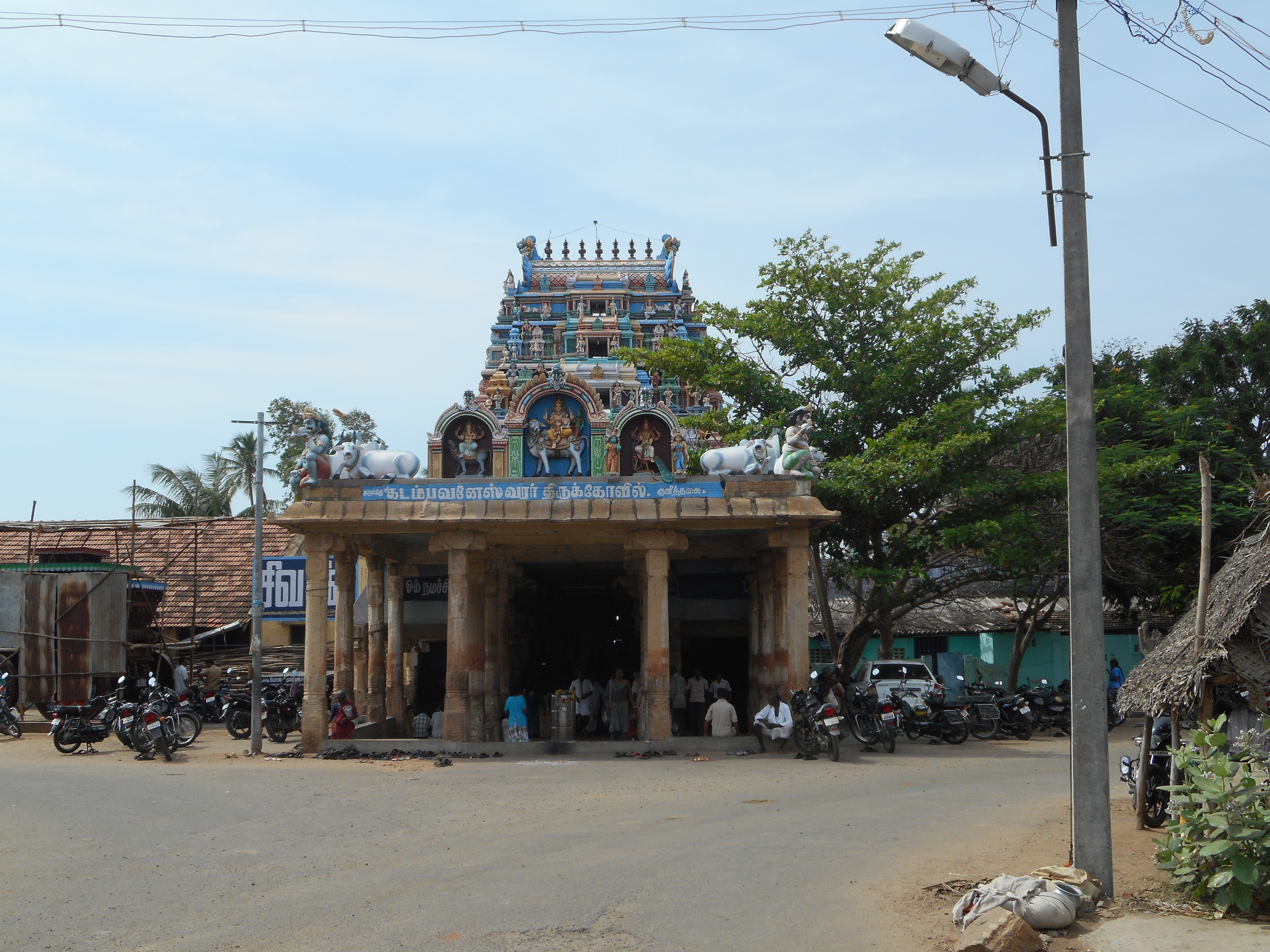

- Location in Tamil Nadu, India
- Coordinates: 10.56°N 78.25°E
- Country: India
- State: Tamil Nadu
- District: Karur
- Region: Karur

Government
  - Type: Second Grade Municipality
- Elevation: 86 m (282 ft)

Population (2011)
  - Total: 27,910

Languages
  - Official: Tamil
- Time zone: UTC+5:30 (IST)
- Vehicle registration: TN-47

Kulithalai /kʊlɪðɑːlaɪ/ (Tamil: [kuɭittalaɪ]) is a town in Karur district in the Indian state of Tamil Nadu. The recorded history of Kulithalai is known from Cheras, followed by medieval Chola period of the 9th century and has been ruled, at different times, by the Medieval Cholas, Later Cholas, Later Pandyas, Vijayanagar Empire and the British.

Kulithalai comes under the Kulithalai assembly constituency which elects a member to the Tamil Nadu Legislative Assembly once every five years and it is a part of the Perambalur (Lok Sabha constituency) which elects its Member of Parliament (MP) once in five years. The town is administered by the Kulithalai municipality, which covers an area of 11.16 km^{2} (4.31 sq mi). As of 2011, the town had a population of 27,910. The town is a part of the fertile Cauvery delta region and agriculture is the major occupation. Roadways are the major mode of transportation to Kulithalai and the town also has rail connectivity. The nearest Airport is Tiruchirapalli Airport, located 40 km (25 mi) away from the town

== Etymology and history ==
The town derives its name from the presiding deity of the Kadamba Vaneswarar temple. The 7th century Nayanmars (Saiva saints) Thirunavukkarasar, revered the place as Kadambandurai and Kuzhithandalai in his works in Tevaram. The word Kuzhithandalai, in modern times, is denoted as Kulithalai. As per Hindu legend, Saptha Matha, the seven divine virgins were praying to god Shiva in the Kadamba forest located here to save them from a demon named Doomralochana. Shiva is believed to have killed the demon to save the forest and the virgins, thereby getting the name Kadhambavaneshwarar, meaning the Lord of Kadamba Forest.

== Geography and climate ==
Kulithalai is located at 10.56°N 78.29°E. and has a contour extending in north–south and east–west orientation. The town is located in Karur district of the South Indian state, Tamil Nadu, at a distance of 370 km (230 mi) from Chennai. Kulithalai is located on the banks of Kaveri river. The topography is almost plain, with no major geological formation. There are no notable mineral resources available in and around the town. The soil types are alluvial and red that are conducive for common crops in the Cauvery delta. The temperature ranges from a maximum of 32.7 °C (90.9 °F) to a minimum of 24 °C (75 °F). Like the rest of the state, April to June are the hottest months and December to January are the coldest. Kulithalai receives an average of 27 cm (11 in) annually, which is lesser than the state average of 1,008 mm (39.7 in). The South west monsoon, with an onset in June and lasting up to August, brings scanty rainfall. Bulk of the rainfall is received during the North East monsoon in the months of October, November and December. The average number of rainy days ranges from 35-40 every year.

== Demographics ==
Religious census
Religion	Percent(%)
Hindu	89.47%
Muslim	7.35%
Christian	3.12%
Sikh	0.02%
Other	0.05%

Historical population
Year	Pop.	±%
1961	20,558	—
1971	21,650	+5.3%
1981	22,374	+3.3%
1991	23,996	+7.2%
2001	26,161	+9.0%
2011	27,910	+6.7%
Sources: 1961 – 2001; 2011

According to 2011 census, Kulithalai had a population of 27,910 with a sex-ratio of 1,016 females for every 1,000 males, much above the national average of 929. A total of 2,522 were under the age of six, constituting 1,313 males and 1,209 females. Scheduled Castes and Scheduled Tribes accounted for 16.77% and .4% of the population respectively. The average literacy of the town was 81.22%, compared to the national average of 72.99%. The town had a total of : 7374 households. There were a total of 10,844 workers, comprising 362 cultivators, 1,829 main agricultural labourers, 302 in house hold industries, 7,746 other workers, 605 marginal workers, 9 marginal cultivators, 215 marginal agricultural labourers, 21 marginal workers in household industries and 360 other marginal workers. There was a higher population growth during the decade of 1991. The gross population density of the town as of 2001 stood at 2,344 person per km^{2}. As per the religious census of 2011, Kulithalai had 89.47% Hindus, 7.35% Muslims, 3.12% Christians, 0.02% Sikhs and 0.05% following other religions.

The city covers an area of 1,116.055 hectares (11.16055 km^{2}). Out of the total area, 16.61per cent of the land constituting 185.355 hectares (1.85355 km^{2}) is marked developed and out of the remaining, 664.31 hectares (6.6431 km^{2}) of land is used for agriculture and 266.39 hectares (2.6639 km^{2}) of land is under water. Residential areas make up 14.31per cent (15.66 hectares (0.1566 km^{2})) of the town's total area while commercial enterprises and industrial units make up 1.2per cent (13.37 hectares (0.1337 km^{2})) and 0.17per cent (1.95 hectares (0.0195 km^{2})) respectively.

== Economy and transportation ==
Agriculture and allied agro-based industries form the economic base of Kulithalai. There are house hold industries like gem cutting and rice mills, oil mills and coir manufacturing units located along New Court Street and Manaparai Road. There are no major industries in the town. As of 2001, worker population constituted 37.6 per cent of the total population. Out of the total workforce, 7,034 constituting 71.58 per cent people were employed in tertiary sector, 1,707 people constituting 17.37 per cent were involved in primary sector, 58 people constituting 0.22 per cent were involved in secondary sector and 1,028 people constituting 10.46 per cent marginal workers. The town is a centre for trading for the surrounding villages, housing provisional stores, food grain stores, vegetable shops, hotels, markets and fertilizer shops.

The Kulithalai municipality maintains 33.785 km (20.993 mi) of roads. The town has 8.117 km (5.044 mi) concrete roads, 21.09 km (13.10 mi) of black-topped roads, 0.43 km (0.27 mi) of WBM roads and 4.148 km (2.577 mi) earthen roads. The town is located in the National Highway NH 67 between Karur and Trichy. It is located 35 km (22 mi) from Trichy and 40 km (25 mi) away from Karur. Kulithalai is served by town bus service, which provides connectivity within the town and the suburbs. Minibus service operated by private companies cater to the local transport needs. The bus stand is maintained by the municipality, which runs it on a rented site. It is located in the Karur Trichy main Road. The Tamil Nadu State Transport Corporation operates daily services connecting various cities to Kulithalai. The major inter city bus routes from the town are to cities like Trichy and Karur. Kulithalai railway station is located in the rail head from Trichy to Karur. There are daily express trains running on either sides connecting Kulithalai with cities like Coimbatore, Erode, Palakkad, Mangalore, Cochin and Mysore. There are also passenger trains running either side from Karur to Trichy.

== Municipal administration and politics ==
Municipality officials
Chairman	V.P.Sekar
Commissioner
Vice-Chairman	K.M.Senthilkumar
Elected members
Member of Legislative Assembly	R.Manickam
Member of Parliament

Kulithalai is administered by a second-grade^{a} municipality formed in 1994 and it covers an area of 11.16 km^{2} (4.31 sq mi). The Kulithalai municipality has 24 wards and there is an elected councillor for each of those wards. The functions of the municipality are devolved into six departments: general administration/personnel, Engineering, Revenue, Public Health, city planning and Information Technology (IT). All these departments are under the control of a Municipal Commissioner who is the executive head. The legislative powers are vested in a body of 24 members, one each from the 24 wards. The legislative body is headed by an elected Chairperson assisted by a Deputy Chairperson.

Kulithalai comes under the Kulithalai assembly constituency and it elects a member to the Tamil Nadu Legislative Assembly once every five years. M. Karunanidhi, five time Chief Minister of Tamil Nadu and leader of Dravida Munnetra Kazhagam won his first legislative elections from Kulithatlai constituency in 1962. From the 1977 elections, All India Anna Dravid Munnetra Kazhagam (AIADMK) won the assembly seat four times (in 1984, 1991, 2001 and 2011 elections), twice by Dravida Munnetra Kazhagam (DMK, 1996 and 2006 elections) and once each by Communist Party of India (CPI, 1980 elections), and Indian National Congress (INC, 1977). The current MLA of the constituency is A.Pappasundaram from AIADMK.

After 2009 delimitation, Kulithalai is a part of the Perambalur (Lok Sabha constituency) – it has the following six assembly constituencies – Kulithalai, Perambalur, Lalgudi, Manachanallur, Thuraiyur and Musiri. The current Member of Parliament from the constituency is R.P. Marutharaja from the AIADMK.

Law and order in the town in maintained by the Kulithalai sub division of the Karur district of Tamil Nadu Police headed by a Deputy Superintendent. There are one police station in located in Old Court street.

== Education and utility services ==
As of 2011, there were two government higher secondary schools, three middle school, three primary schools and fifteen other private schools in Kulithalai. Government Arts College, started in 2007, is the only college in the town. VKS College of Engineering and Technology, located 15 km (9.3 mi) off Kulithalai - Manapparai state highway, is the closest engineering college to the town. There is an ITI located in at Peralamman Kovil street. All the other nearest colleges are present in Karur and Trichy.

Electricity supply to Kulithalai is regulated and distributed by the Tamil Nadu Electricity Board (TNEB). The town along with its suburbs is a part of Tiruchirappalli Electricity Distribution Circle. Water supply is provided by the Kulithalai Municipality from borewells in Kaveri river through two over head tanks located in the town. In the period 2000–2001, a total of 70 lakh litres of water was supplied every day for households in the town. As per the municipal data for 2011, about 9 metric tonnes of solid waste were collected from Kulithalai every day by door-to-door collection and subsequently the source segregation and dumping was carried out by the sanitary department of the Kulithalai municipality. The coverage of solid waste management in the town by the municipality had an efficiency of 100% as of 2001. There is no underground drainage system in the town and the sewerage system for disposal of sullage is through septic tanks, open drains and public conveniences. As of 2011, there was one government hospital and 12 other private hospitals and clinics that take care of the health care needs of the citizens. As of 2011, the municipality maintained a total of 1,309 street lamps: 146 sodium lamps, 42 mercury vapour lamps, 1,037 tube lights, 35 ordinary lights and seven solar. The municipality operates two markets, namely the Weekly Market and Uzhavar Santhai that cater to the needs of the town and the rural areas around it.

== Culture ==
Kadambar Kovil is an ancient Shiva temple located in the centre of the town. It is the second of the paadal petra Siva sthalams in the region. Built on the banks of river Cauvery, the temple has a tall gopuram (gateway tower) and the stone walls. The Thai Poosam festival held in the Tamil month of Thai is famous for the congregation of deities from the surrounding seven villages and attracts lot of visitors. The annual Mariamman Kovil Thiru Therr Vizha held in the temple is another prominent festival in the town. The fortnightly ritual culminates on the festive day when people perform their prayers and offerings through Theertha Kudam (water pot), Alagu (piercing body parts), Agni Chatti (fire pot) and Pookuli Midhithal (walking on fire).

Rathnagirinathar temple at ancient Rathinagiri, which is currently called as Iyermalai or Ayyarmalai or Aivar Malai is located at about 10 km (6.2 mi) far from Kulithalai, southerly. This is the first Padal petra sthalam in the region. The Ratnagireeeswarar temple is built on a hillock reached by a flight of 1000+ steps while the Sivapureeswarar temple is at the foothills level. The idols of Siva and Ambal face each other in the Upadesa posture in the temple.

As per a legend, Vayu Bhaghvan and Adiseshan had a dispute to find out who is superior, to prove the superiority adiseshan encircled the Kailasam, Vayu tried to remove this encircle by creating santamarutham (Twister). Because of the santamarutham, 8 kodumudigal (parts) fell from Kailasam into 8 different places which are Thirugonamalai (Trincomalee, Sri Lanka), Thirukalahasti, Thiruchiramalai rock fort, Thiruenkoimalai, Rajathagiri, Neerthagiri, Ratnagiri (Ayyar Malai), and Suwethagiri or Thirupangeeli. The Ayyar malai temple attracts lot of visitors during full moon days and somavaram (Mondays) during the Tamil Month of Karthigai.

Thiru Eengoinathar Malai is a small hill temple, which is another nearby Paadal petra sthalam situated around 3 km (1.9 mi) to the north of Kulithalai.

Traditionally, it is considered auspicious to visit on the same day three padal petra sthalams - Kadambar Kovil at Kulithalai, Rathnagirinathar temple at Rathinagiri (now called Ayyarmalai) and Thiru Eengoi Malai at Mullipadi.

Karpatthur Shivan Temple, located around 7 km (4.3 mi) to the west of Kulithalai, Neelamegha Perumal temple, built during the period of Pallavas, Vaiganallur Perumal Temple and Manathattai Perumal temple are other famous temples around Kulithalai.

CSI Church, Amalarakkini Aalayam and Kulithalai Mosque are the other worship places.

== Notes ==
=== Footnotes ===
- The municipalities in Tamil Nadu are graded special, selection, grade I and grade II based on income and population. While "grade II" is the official classification, all the municipal websites use "second grade".
