= Rachagunneri railway station =

Railway station in Andhra Pradesh

Rachagunneri

General information
- Location: Rachagunneri, Tirupati district, Andhra Pradesh; India
- Coordinates: 13.714631°N 79.629853°E
- Elevation: 82 metres (269 ft)
- System: Indian Railways station
- Owner: Indian Railways
- Operator: Indian Railways
- Line: Gudur–Katpadi branch line
- Platforms: 2
- Tracks: broad gauge

Construction
- Structure type: Standard (on ground)

Other information
- Status: Functioning
- Station code: RCG
- Zone(s): SCR
- Division(s): Guntakal

Services
Preceding station	Indian Railways	Following station
Srikalahasti towards ?	South Coast Railway zone Gudur–Katpadi branch line	Yerpedu towards ?
Location
- Interactive map

Rachagunneri railway station is a railway station located on the Gudur–Katpadi railway line operated by the South Coast Railway zone under Guntakal railway division. It is situated at Rachagunneri in Tirupati district in the Indian state of Andhra Pradesh.
