= Avanangattilkalari Vishnumaya Temple =

Hindu temple in Thrissur district, Kerala, India

Avanangattilkalari Sree Vishnumaya Temple
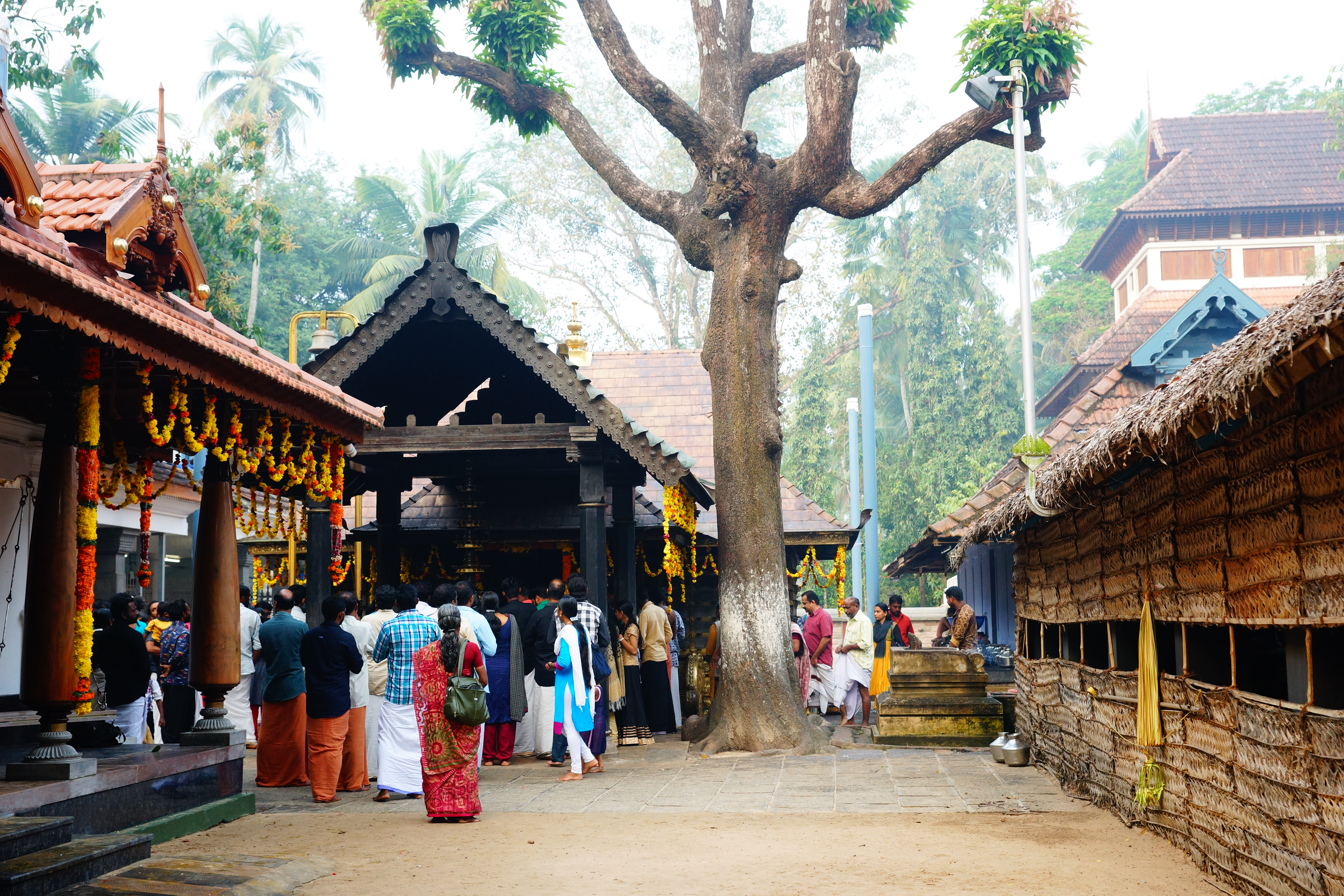
- Avanangattilkalari Temple; Avanangattilakalari Vishnumaya Temple

- Avanangattilkalari Vishnumaya Temple, Peringottukara, Thrissur, Kerala

Religion
- Affiliation: Hinduism
- District: Thrissur
- Deity: Vishnumaya (വിഷ്ണുമായ)
- Festival: Vellattumaholsavam

Location
- Location: Peringottukara
- State: Kerala
- Country: India
- Coordinates: 10.436885°N 76.129635°E

Architecture
- Type: Architecture of Kerala
- Completed: more than 500 years ago

Specifications
- Temple: 1
- Monument: 2
- Elevation: 31.92 m (105 ft)

Website
- www.avanangattilkalari.com

Avanangattilkalari Sree Vishnumaya Temple (alternatively Avanangatt Chathan Temple) is a Hindu temple at Peringottukara, Thrissur District, Kerala state, India. It is dedicated to the god Vishnumaya in Kerala. The god is known also by the name Chathan.

Avanangattilkalari vishnumaya temple is the head temple of all vishnumaya temples in Kerala, especially Malabar. The temple avanangattilkalari is known as sree vishnumaya's "moolasthanam". The idol of the temple represents the god in his fierce ('ugra') form, facing East, featuring two hands with various attributes. One is holding Kuruvadi (Magical wand), another hand magical pot (amrutha kumbam) and riding on water buffalo. The temple deity is well known for his magical powers.

The temple gained the name Avanangattilkalari from the surrounding Ricinus plants which is called "avanaku" in Malayalam language. The area was covered chiefly with ricinus trees and it appeared as a ricinus forest. In Malayalam, "kadu" means forest and hence the name Avananku-kadu. This name then changed to avanangattil kalari. Kalari refers to a location in which the Kerala traditional martial art called "kalaripayattu" is taught. The temple is often accredited as the original form of Vishnumaya and his 389 brothers. When the god was born with his 399 other brothers, 10 brothers sacrificed their life in war between Shiva boothas (god Shiva's army) and demon nameed Briga Rakshas. Ten brothers consumed brahmastra in the time of combat and helped Shiva boothas to kill Rakshas Briga.

The temple is in the center of Kerala and is called "vishnumaya chathan temple" by Tamil speakers. The name of chathan came from the word sastha. The Temple was built in a remote past and its worship incorporates ancient Shakthyem customs which are rarely observed in contemporary Kerala temples.

== History ==
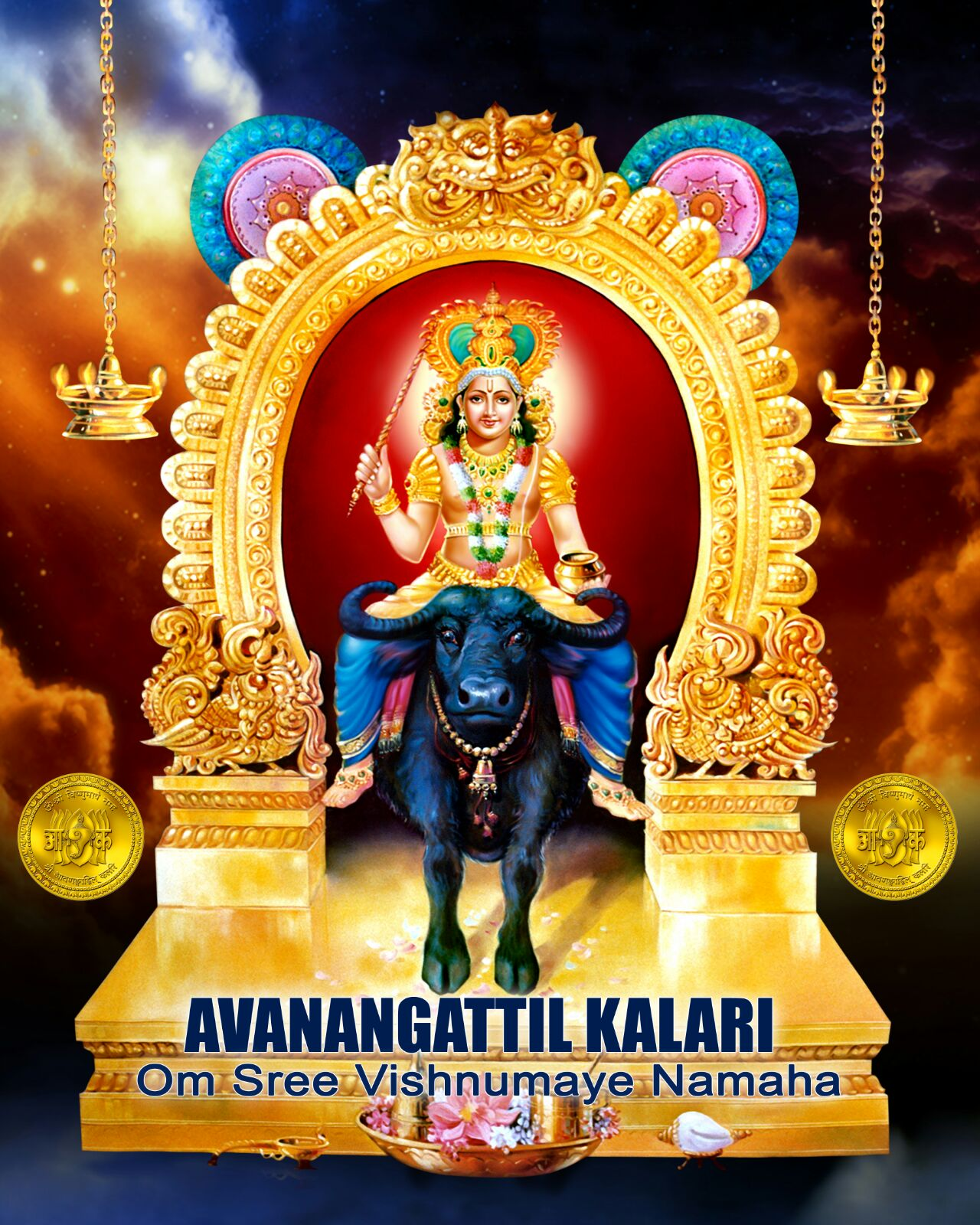
God Sree vishnumaya

The people of Kerala believe that this temple was, in the olden days, a small shrine and it was Kellunni Panicker who installed the murthi of Vishnumaya close to one of his kalari. The pujas are conducted, it is said, under direct instructions from the god himself. Near to temple there is a mango tree and small rock shire is there called "Valliyachan kottil" believed to be the main source of the powers of this deity. The priests are panickers and Thiyyar families who have a right to perform 'Pushpanjalis' to the God.

Avanangattilkalari Sree Vishnumaya temple is allowed all other religious members to attend temple. His temple is very much related to Sabarimala Ayyappa Temple, sastha and chathan is commonly mixed each times. Other than Sabarimala, temple allows all religious women also. The temple reconstructed in the time of Sakthan Thampuran who provided financial support also. Sakthan Thampuran provide one donation champers inside Thriprayar Temple still there in red color. As the old believe in the time of Arattupuzha Pooram festival, Deity travel to Avanangattilkalari Sree Vishumaya temple and meet Sree Vishnumaya, it is called "Pooram Purapad".

Currently Avanangattilkalari temple is administered by temple trust and not taking any aid from Thriprayar temple. The temple was constructed by Kellunni Panicker. The first Shaktheya Pooja in Avanangattilkalari temple was performed by Panicker families still follows.

In ancient times, animal sacrifices were offered at the temple, mostly in the forms of birds, by devotees seeking protection and the fulfillment of their prayers. At present, only red-dyed silks are offered to the deity.

== Temple structure ==
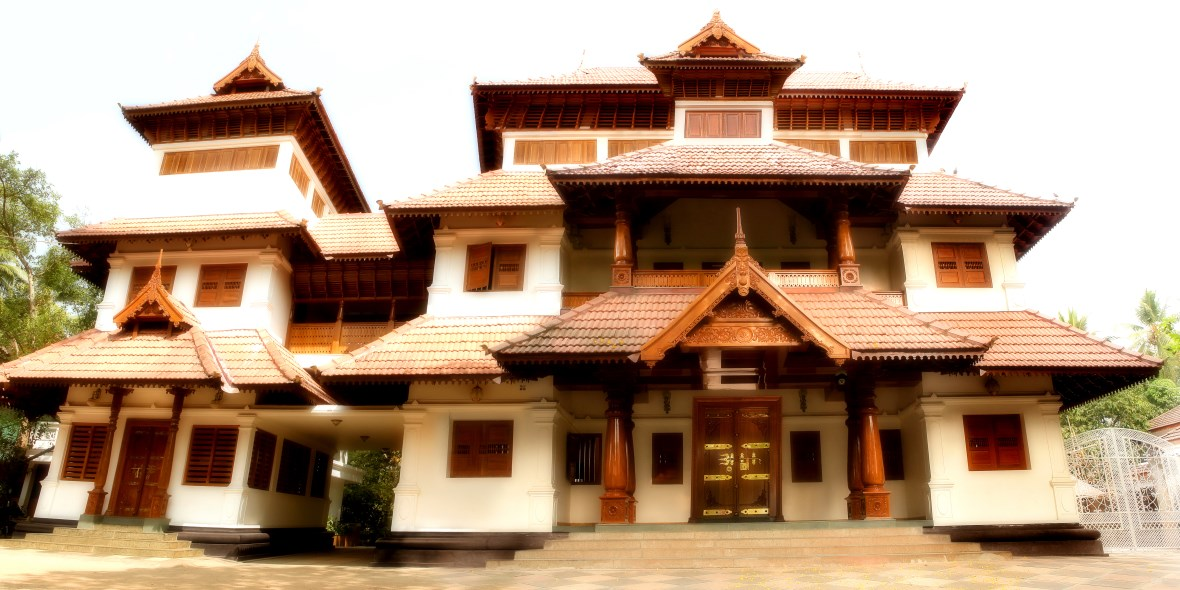
East Entrance

The temple is situated in the middle of a plot of land about ten acres, surrounded by paddy field. The "manimandapam" or "sreekovil" is facing east. East side of the small bhagavathi shire, two Sarpakavu. West side temple pond, which serve purpose of well (bath not allowed). East and west "padipura"(entrance). North side "ananadhana mandapam" serve devotes every day.

== Ritual ==
During this ritual, oracle person called Vellichapad, (oracles of the god), addressed as the god and said to be possessed by him, sit in-front of the temple in a frenzied trance state called niyogam. Niyogam will perform every day. Special pooja only perform Full moon or new moon day only. All karma follows saktheya manner.

== Festivals ==
=== Vellattu maholsavam ===
The "vellattumaholsam" festival at the Avanangattilkalari Vishnumaya temple, is a month of festivities from the month of Kumbham, it is ten day festival. It normally falls between the months of February and March. The festival usually starts with a ritual called 'Ezhunallathu', which forms an important feature of this temple. The members of the "Thira manar" are allowed to participate in this ritual. It is to appease the god Vishnumaya and her demons who take delight in the offerings.

=== Kalampattu ===
The kalampattu festival will perform four day before "karkidakam" and "vrichikam" Malayalam months (February or march month).
