= Srikalahasti railway station =

Railway station in Andhra Pradesh, India

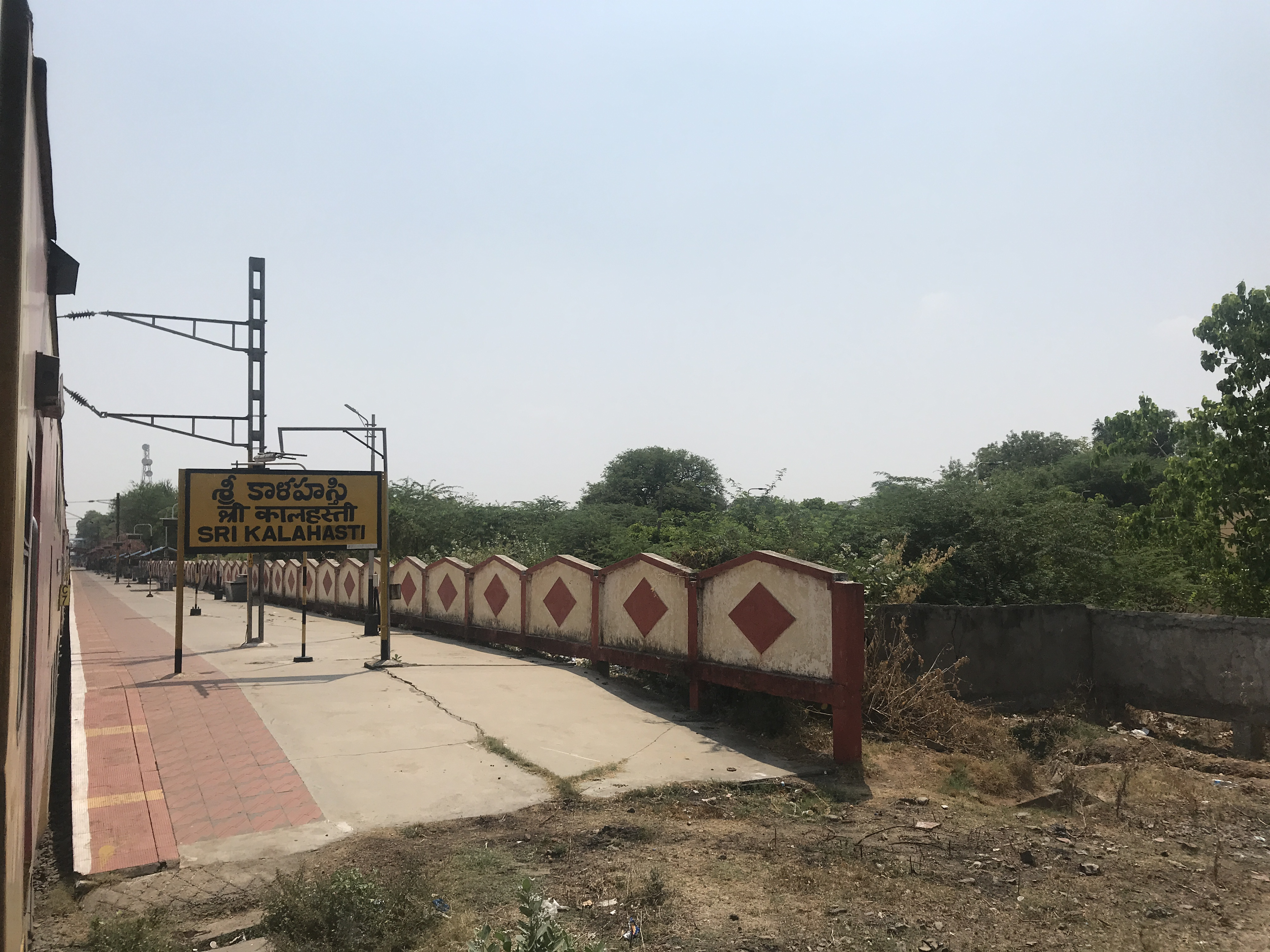
- Srikalahasti railway station board

General information
- Location: SH-61, Srikalahasti, Tirupati district, Andhra Pradesh; India
- Coordinates: 13.7438°N 79.6817°E
- Operator: Indian Railways
- Line: Gudur–Katpadi branch line
- Platforms: 2

Construction
- Structure type: On ground
- Accessible: Disabled access

Other information
- Status: Active
- Station code: KHT
- Zone(s): South Coast Railway zone
- Division(s): Guntakal

Services
Preceding station	Indian Railways	Following station
Akkurti towards ?	Gudur–Renigunta section	Rachagunneri towards ?
Location
- Location within Andhra Pradesh Location within India

Srikalahasti railway station (station code:KHT) is an Indian railway station in Srikalahasti town of Andhra Pradesh. It lies on the Gudur–Katpadi branch line and is administered under Guntakal railway division of South Coast Railway zone.

== Classification ==
Srikalahasti railway station is classified as a B–category station in the Guntakal railway division.
