= Yerpedu railway station =

Railway station in Andhra Pradesh

Yerpedu
- Yerpedu Railway station

General information
- Location: Yerpedu, Tirupati district, Andhra Pradesh; India
- Coordinates: 13.689108°N 79.578514°E
- Elevation: 106 metres (348 ft)
- System: Indian Railways station
- Owner: Indian Railways
- Operator: Indian Railways
- Line: Gudur–Katpadi branch line
- Platforms: 2
- Tracks: broad gauge

Construction
- Structure type: Standard (on ground)

Other information
- Status: Functioning
- Station code: YPD
- Zone(s): SCR
- Division(s): Guntakal

Services
Preceding station	Indian Railways	Following station
Rachagunneri towards ?	South Coast Railway zone Gudur–Katpadi branch line	Renigunta Junction towards ?
Location
- Interactive map

Yerpedu railway station is a railway station located on the Gudur–Katpadi railway line operated by the South Coast Railway zone under Guntakal railway division. It is situated at Yerpedu in Tirupati district in the Indian state of Andhra Pradesh.
