= Kuttichathan Theyyam =

Hindu god

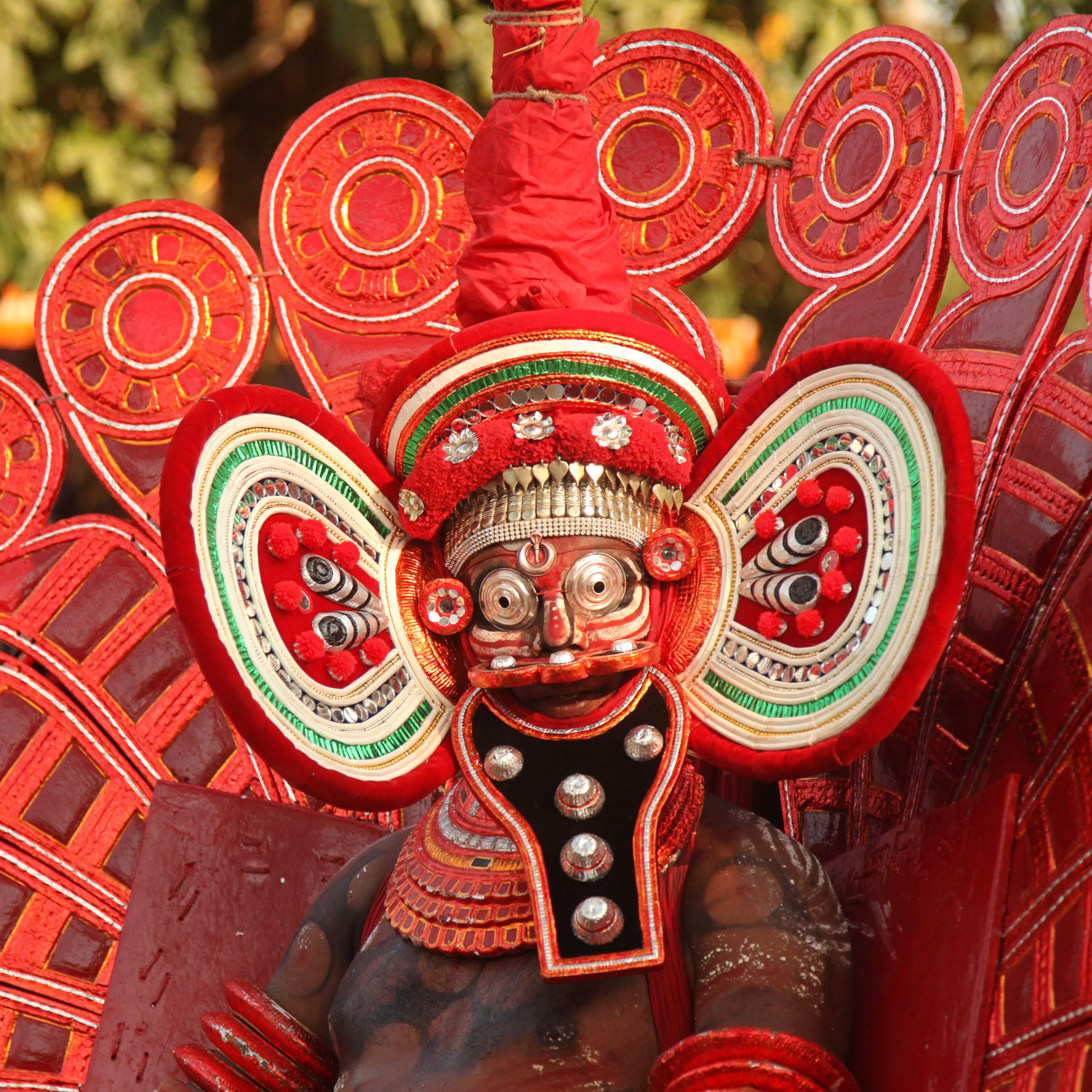
- Kuttichathan theyyam face
- Affiliation: Hinduism
- Region: North Kerala, India

Kuttichathan Theyyam also known as Sasthappan Theyyam is a Theyyam performed in the North Malabar region of Kerala state, India. It honors Kuttichathan, an important guardian deity in Malabari Hindu folkore. As the deity in Kuttichathan theyyam is associated with the Brahmin family from Kalakattu illam in Payyanur in Kannur district, this theyyam is also known as Kalakattu Kuttichathan.

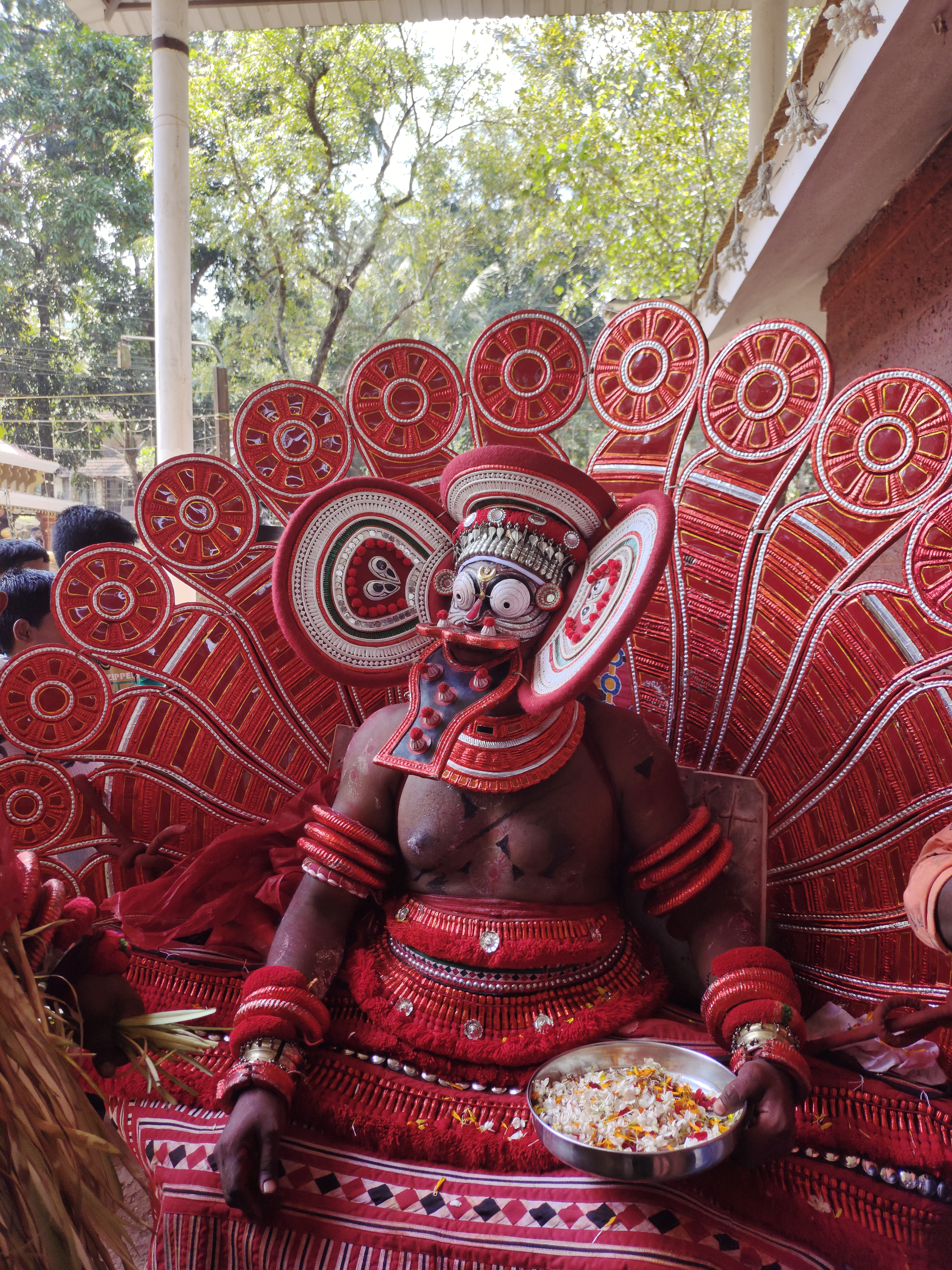
Shasthappan Theyyam

== Myth ==
=== Son of Shiva and Parvathi ===
When lord Shiva and Parvati disguised themselves as Valluvan and Valluvathi, they had two children named Karuval and Kuttichathan. They gave Kuttichathan, who was born with a black body and a flower on the forehead and three eyes, to a childless Namboodiri from Kalakatt illam. He send the child to a Guru for schooling. Kuttichathan, who was not ready to obey the Guru, began to adopt practices contrary to Brahmanical customs. Due to his extraordinary intelligence, the Guru could not answer many of the child's questions. Guru rebuked and beat Kuttichathan who did not obey him. As a revenge Chathan killed Guru and left the place. Knowing this, Namboothiri told his wife Atholamma not to feed the starving child. When he was hungry and asked for milk, she rejected and in anger the boy killed a bull and drank his blood. In this, angry Namboothiri hacked Kuttichathan to death. But he reborn. Namboothiri brought in a large number of Brahmins and killed Kuttichathan and cut his body into 396 pieces and burned in 21 Homakundams (a type of holy kiln). There were many Kuttichathans born from that klins and they set fire to Nampoothiri's house and the nearby Brahmin houses. They decided to worship the persecuted Kuttichathan as Theyyam. This is the myth behind Kuttichathan theyyam.

=== Son of Namboothiri ===
Another story says Kuttichathan is the child born to Namboothiri and a backward Pulaya woman who used to sweep the house. Fearing embarrassment, the pregnant woman locked herself in a stone room and after birth the boy was secretly raised in the room. There are also stories that when he was growing up, he stole rice and paddy from the house and given to the poor lower caste people.

Another story says Kuttichathan is the child born to Namboothiri and a backward Pana woman. Only because he was born the son of an illegitimate woman, the son did not inherit the father's dominion. The child who grew up neglected became very naughty. Once, when he was thirsty for water, people insulted him by not giving water. The angry Kuttichathan slaughtered the bull and drank the blood to quench his thirst, and left the place and reached Lokanarkavu via Vadakara Kuttoth.

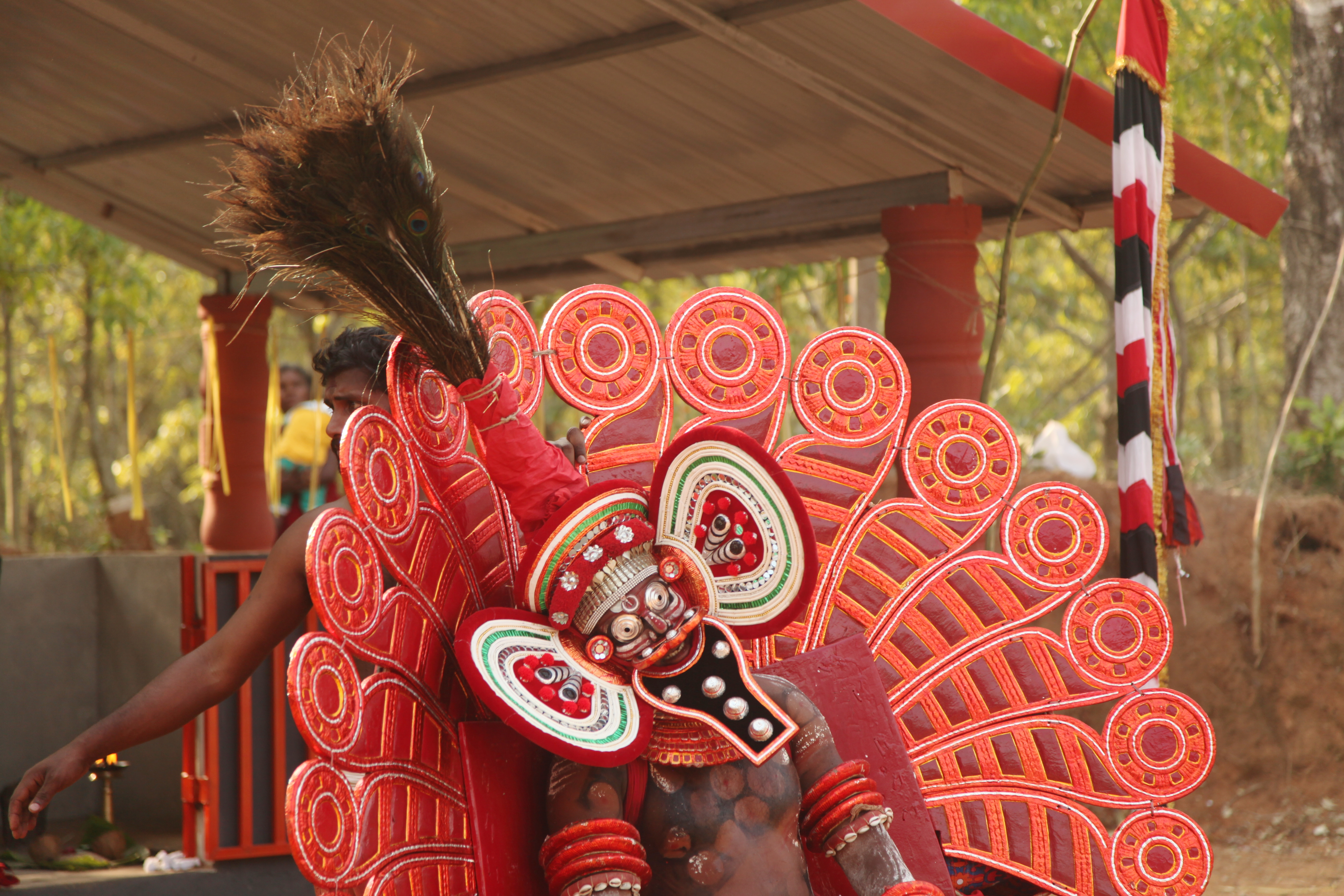
Kuttichathan theyyam performed in a temple in Wayanad district

== Appearance ==
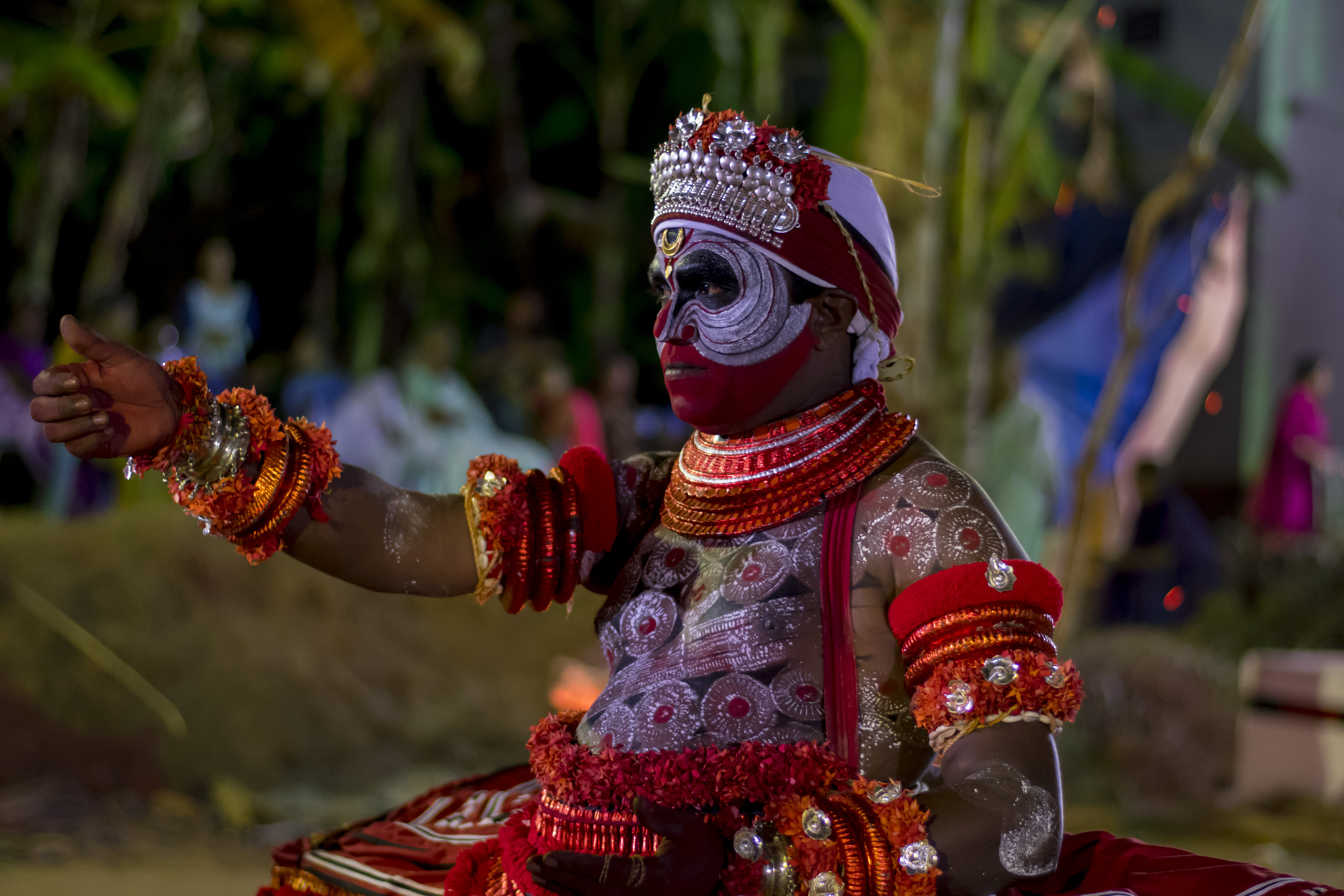
Kuttichathan Theyyam Vellattam

Wearing a long rectangular waist, Kuttichathan Theyyam's headgear consists two pieces of wood on either side of the cheeks. Theyyam performer cover their eyes with a metallic cap with a central small hole to look at. The costume also contains a peacock-like extensions on their backs. Overall color is red.
