= Neelivaneswarar Temple =

Hindu temple in Tamil Nadu, India

Neelivaneswarar or Gneeliwaneswarar Temple, also known as Vishwanathar Temple at Thiruppaingneeli or Thirupanjali, is a Hindu temple situated 20 km north of Tiruchirappalli, Tamil Nadu, India. The presiding deity is Neelnedunkanni, also known as Visalashi. The temple is frequented by unmarried men and women looking for spouses. There are inscriptions belonging to Raja Raja Chola I and Rajendra Chola I. The Soundareeswara shrine within the temple is believed to have been constructed by Mahendravarman I in 640 AD.

As per a legend, Vayu Bhaghvan and Adiseshan had a dispute to find out who was superior. To prove the superiority adiseshan encircled the Kailasam, Vayu tried to remove this circle by creating santamarutham (Twister). Because of the santamarutham, 8 kodumudigal (parts) fell from kailasam into eight different places: Thirugonamalai, Sri Lanka, Thirukalahasti, Thiruchiramalai Rock fort, Thiruenkoimalai, Rajathagiri, Neerthagiri, Ratnagiri, and Suwethagiri. Suwethagiri is also called as Thirupangeeli. Because this place came from Kailasam, it is called as Thenkailasam in Tamil.

Lord Shiva in this temple is called as Gneelivaneswarar. Shiva is in the form Suyambu linga (self manifest). There are many names for Shiva in this temple like Kathali Vasanthar, Gneelivaneswarar, Paramasambu, Aaraniya Vallaver, Eluthariya Peruman. The name of the goddess is Vishalakshi Neelnedunkanni amman.

The shrine of lord vishnu named Senthamaraikannan lies inside the temple. Indiran, Kamadhenu, Adiseshan, Vayu Bhaghvan, Agni Bhaghwan, Rama piran, Arujunan, Vasista, Sudhamamunivar, Sapta Rishis, Musukunda Chola, Kaliyugarama Pandiyan, Viyakirasuran, Sivamithiran, Padumakarpan, Sutharman, Ankamithiran are other deities worshipped in this temple. Chinnandavar and Periyandavar, rural guardian deities are also located in the temple premises. There are other Sannidis in the premises: Kasi Viswanathar Sannidhi and Sorudiya Eswarar Sannidhi (legend associated with the rebirth of Yama, and with the story of Appar being guided here).

Soothamamunivar did tapas in this temple for many years and he attained Moksha here. The statue of Suthamahamunivar lies in the outer precincts of the temple, southerly. There is no Navagraha shrine separately as the steps leading to the main shrine is said to be Navagrahas. In front of statue of the Nandhi, the Navagrahas are prayed by lighting the stone cavern hole lamps made on the floor. Temple complex is big with a Rajagopuram standing 30 ft tall that is incomplete. There is Rathina Sabha in this temple like the famed one in Chidambaram.

Plantain tree is worshiped here and poojas are performed to the tree. Both men and women, and people of other faith including Christians and Muslims perform poojas to the plantain tree especially on the Sundays and Fridays. The temple has preserved hundreds of invitations received from those whose marriages have been solemnized after they performed the poojas.

== Speciality ==
It is one of the shrines of the 275 Paadal Petra Sthalams.

There are many stone inscriptions in this temple. Rajendra Chola - I, Rajathi Rajan-I and other Chola kings donated for regular daily poojas and maintenance of the temple.
