= Iravatheeswarar Temple, Thirukottaram =

Temple in India

Coordinates: 10.968522°N 79.739793°E

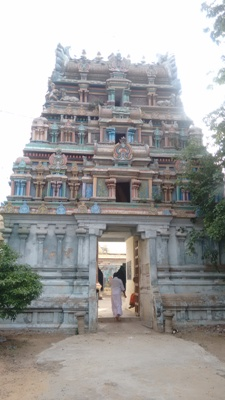
The main entrance of the temple

Iravatheeswarar Temple, Thirukottaram (ஐராவதீசுவரர் கோயில், திருக்கொட்டாரம்) is a Hindu temple located in the village of Thirukottaram in the Tiruvarur district of Tamil Nadu, India. Constructed by the Medieval Cholas about 1000 years ago, the temple is dedicated to Shiva. The temple is situated on the banks of the Vanchiyaru River a tributary of the Kaveri River.

== Legend ==
According to Hindu mythology, the king of the gods Indra and his elephant Airavata once showed disrespect to the sage Durvasa. As a result, the sage cursed both of them. Airavata was born on earth as a wild elephant and was relieved of the curse only after he had spent one hundred years visiting Hindu holy sites. Thirukottaram was one of the sites visited.

== Significance ==
It is one of the shrines of the 275 Paadal Petra Sthalams. Praises of the temple have been sung by Sambandar in the Thevaram. The Thevaram is inscribed on the walls of the temple within the sanctum sanctorum. There are also inscriptions by Kulothunga Chola I who claims to be the builder of the temple.

== Shrines ==
The presiding deity is Shiva. There are also shrines for Ganesha, Bhairava, Murugan, Ardhanarisvara, Surya and Chandra.

== Photogallery ==
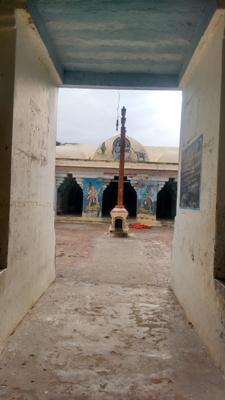
Flagpost

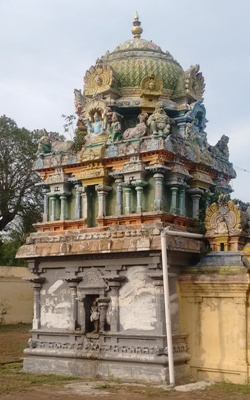
Shrine of the presiding deity

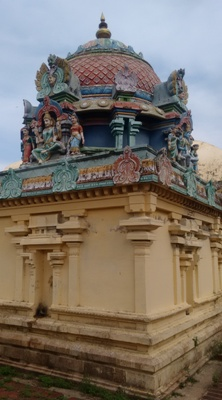
Shrine of the consort

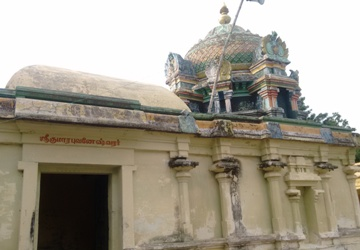
Shrine of the Kumarabuvanesvarar
