= Kuttichathan =

Spirit in Malabari Hindu folklore

Kuttichathan (Malayalam: [kuʈːit͡ːʃaːt̪ːɐn]) is a kshetrapala, a guardian deity in Malabari Hindu folklore, often depicted as a portly adolescent boy, sometimes described as having a kutumi.

The deity Vishnumaya Chathan is depicted as a young boy riding a buffalo and holding a short stick. He is revered as a god who provides prosperity and blessings and is known for creating illusions. According to mythology, Vishnumaya is the son of Shiva and Parvati, born from Parvati's ethereal form.

Kuttichathan's tricks (such as setting his victims clothing on fire, throwing rocks at his victims, and beds turning into beds of thorn) cause great trouble to his victims but never do serious harm. He is said to demand food in exchange for freedom from his harassment. Some Hindus in Malabar believe that sacrificing a cockerel on a regular basis with the correct incantations will appease Kuttichathan, otherwise he will terrorise their families.

== In popular culture ==
- Kuttichaathan a 1975 Malayalam film written by NP Narayanan Pillai.
- My Dear Kuttichathan the first Indian film shot in 3D format, depicts a Kuttichathan who befriends three children.
- Mayavi a Malayalam comic series about a friendly chathan and his fight against the witch of the forest- Dakini and an evil counterpart- Luttapi chathan.
- Bramayugam a 2024 Malayalam movie starring Mammootty as Koduman Poti and as chathan disguised as Poti.
- Lokah Chapter 1: Chandra a 2025 Malayalam film involves multiple chathan characters played by Tovino Thomas.

== See also ==
- Kuttichathan Theyyam
- Avanangattilkalari Vishnumaya Temple
- Kanadikavu Shree Vishnumaya Kuttichathan Swamy temple
