= Thiruengoimalai Maragadachaleswarar Temple =

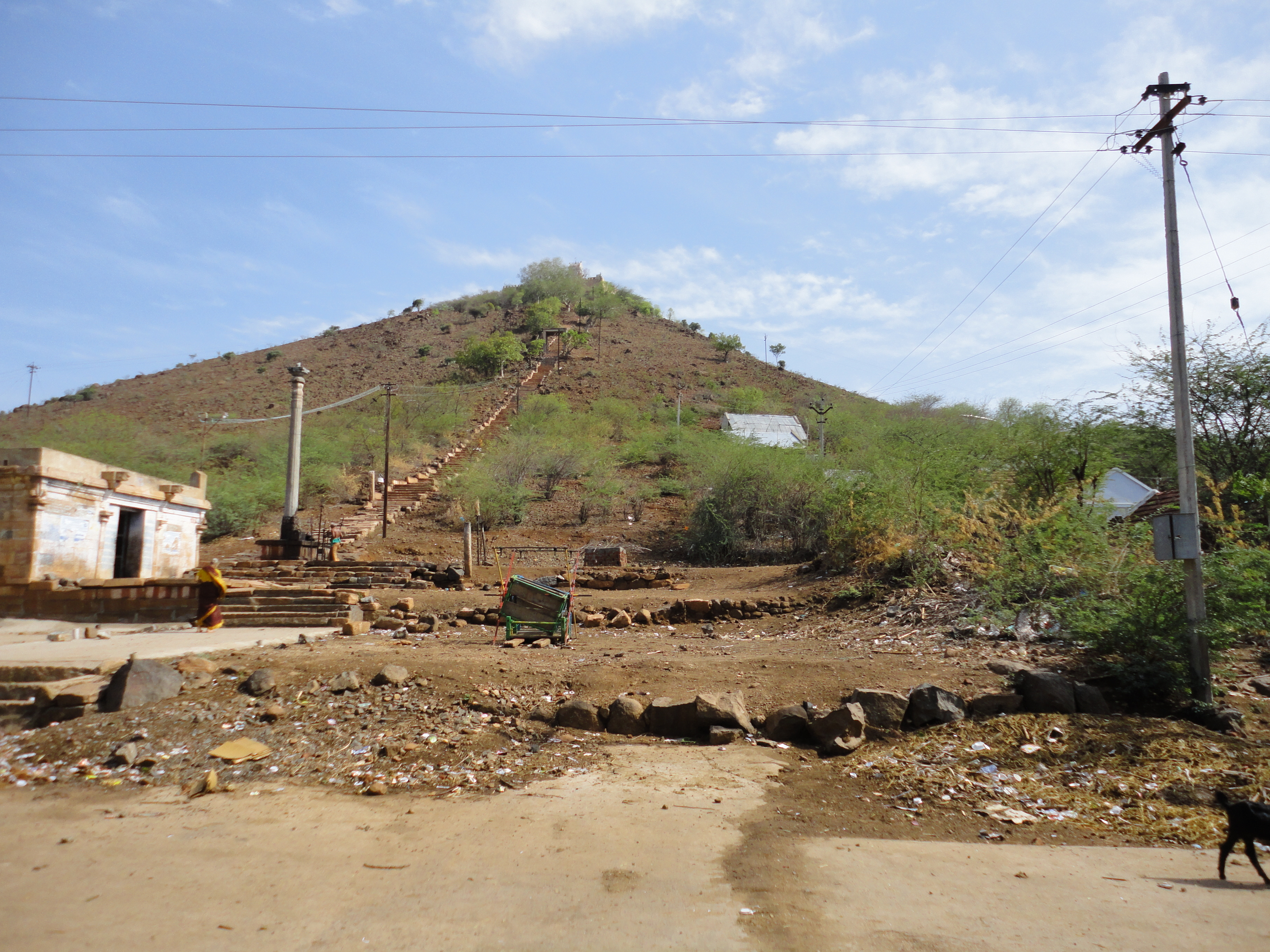
The temple atop the hill

Thiruengoimalai Maragadachaleswarar Temple is a Hindu temple located at Eengoimalai in Trichy district of Tamil Nadu, India. The presiding deity is Shiva. He is called as Maragadachaleswarar and Eengoinathar. His consort is Maragadambikai.

As per a legend, Vayu Bhaghvan and Adiseshan had a dispute to find out who is superior, to prove the superiority adiseshan encircled the Kailasam, Vayu tried to remove this encircle by creating santamarutham (Twister). Because of the santamarutham, 8 kodumudigal (parts) fell from kailasam into 8 different places which are Thirugonamalai, Sri Lanka, Thirukalahasti, Thiruchiramalai, Thiruengoimalai or Thiruenkoimalai, Rajathagiri, Neerthagiri, Ratnagiri, and Suwethagiri or Thirupangeeli.

== Significance ==
It is one of the shrines of the 275 Paadal Petra Sthalams - Shiva Sthalams glorified in the early medieval Tevaram poems by Tamil Saivite Nayanar Tirugnanasambandar.

== Literary Mention ==
Tirugnanasambandar describes the feature of the deity as:

வினையாயின தீர்த்(து)அருளே புரியும் விகிர்தன் விரிகொன்றை

நனையார் முடிமேல் மதியஞ் சூடுநம்பா நலமல்கு
தனையார் கமல மலர் மேல் உறைவான் தலையோ(டு)அனல் ஏந்தும்

எனை ஆளுடையான் உமையாளோடும் ஈங்கோய் மலையாரே.
