= Kshetrapala =

Tutelary guardian deity in Indian religions

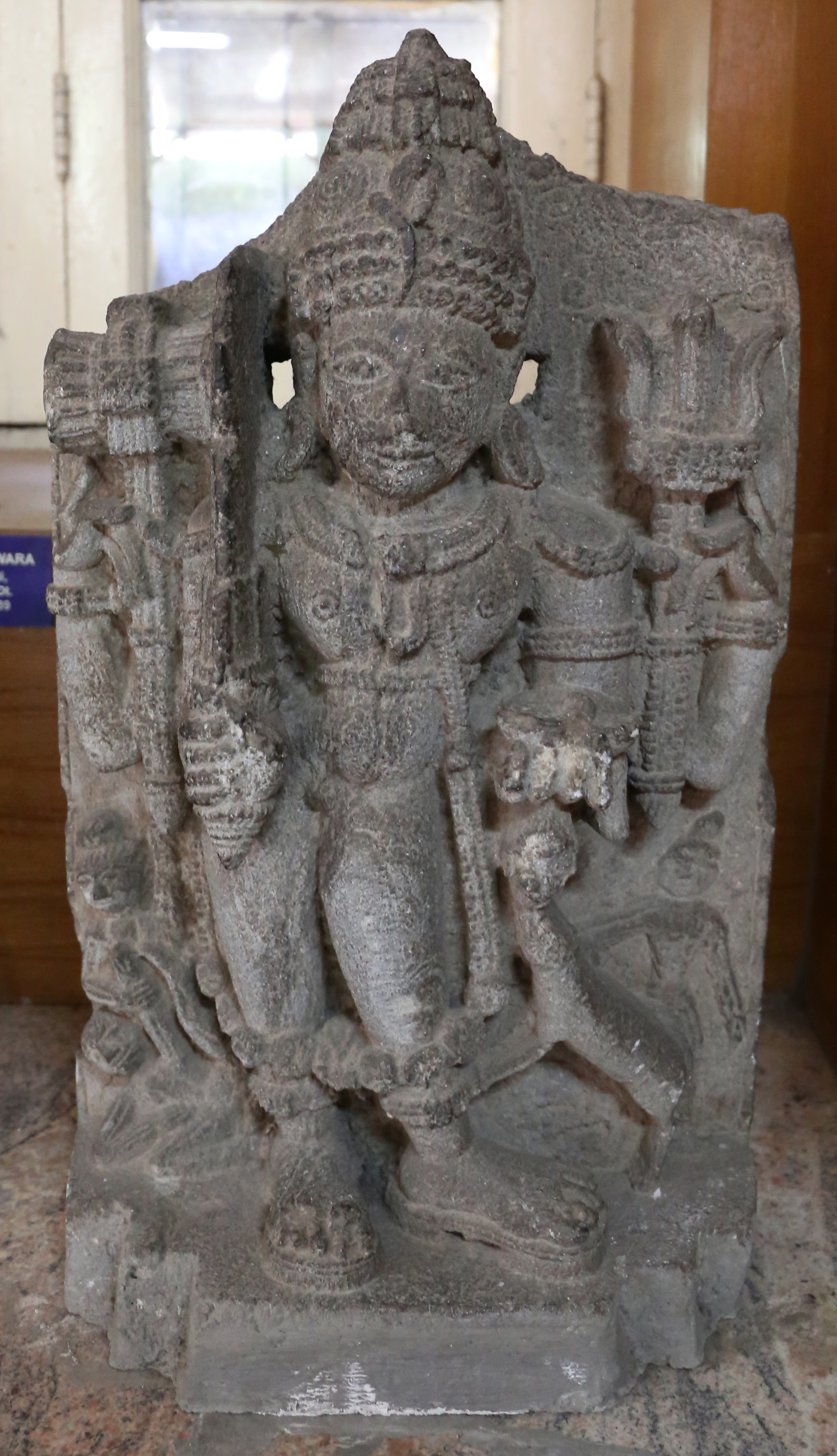
Sculpture of Kshetrapala

Kshetrapala (Sanskrit: क्षेत्रपाल, romanized: Kṣetrapāla) is a guardian deity featured in Indian religions primarily tasked with the protection of a specific territory, locality or field. The deity is widely worshipped across various regions of India and appears in Hindu, Jain and occasionally folk contexts.

== Description ==
The name is derived from the Sanskrit words "kshetra" (i.e., field or territory") and "pala" (i.e., guardian or protector). In traditional Hindu theology, Kshetrapala is regarded as the guardian deity of the locality. His primary role is to safeguard the boundaries and the spiritual sanctity of a village or a temple complex. Kshetrapala is widely worshipped generally in various other parts of India such as villages of Maharashtra, Odisha, Karnataka and Kerala.

== Iconography ==
According to Agamic principles of temple construction, Kshetrapala is classified as a tuletary god. In the layout of a Hindu temple, he is traditionally installed in the third enclosure, known as the Paisachagarbha. He is often grouped with other tuletary deities such as Ganapati, Kalabhairava, or Veerabhadra.

In terms of directional alignment, Kshetrapala is typically situated in the northeast corner of the temple grounds, where he serves as the presiding guardian of that direction.

Kshetrapala is frequently associated or identified with Bhairava, a fierce manifestation of Shiva, leading to the common composite title Kshetrapala Bhairava.

=== The Kandhar Statue ===
One of the most significant archaeological representations of the deity was discovered at Bahadurpur, near the Rashtrakuta capital of Kandhar in Maharashtra. Excavations revealed a massive stone structure built of dressed stones in the form of a human figure, identified as Kshetrapala Bhairava. This statue, which was placed in a supine position, measures 23.15 meters in height, making it potentially the tallest such statue in India. The shrine dates back to the reign of the Rashtrakuta king Krishna III (939-965 AD).

=== Consort and Associated Figures ===
Archaeological evidence from the Kandhar site indicates that Kshetrapala may be associated with a consort; fragments of an image of Yogeshwari were found in a smaller shrine adjacent to the main Kshetrapala monument.

== Regional Variations ==
=== Odisha ===
In the religious landscape of Odisha, a temple dedicated to Maa Kshetrapala is located at Mahabadalapada, near the Bira Ramchandrapur village in the Puri district. The shrine is part of a network of local deities that are ritually integrated with the agrarian settlements and the wider Jagannath tradition.

=== Karnataka ===
Historical inscriptions in Karnataka provide evidence of deity's importance in local administration and economy. A 1309 AD inscription from Kolar refers to the god Tribhuvanavidanga Kshetrapala Pillaiyar. The record states that the income derived from taxes on a weekly fair at Nondanguli was granted to this deity.

=== Jain Tradition ===
The worship of Kshetrapala also extends to Jainism, particularly in South India. In the Jain settlement of Jainamedu, also known as Manikkapattanam, in Palakkad, Kerala, a stone image of Kshetrapala is located within the compound of the Jain shrine dedicated to Chandraprabha. This indicates the deity's role as a protector within Jain sacred spaces.

== See also ==
- Dharmapala
- Dikpala
- Ayyanar

== Sources ==
- Dictionary of Hindu Lore and Legend (ISBN 0-500-51088-1) by Anna Dallapiccola
