= Kulittalai Kadambavaneswarar Temple =

Temple in India

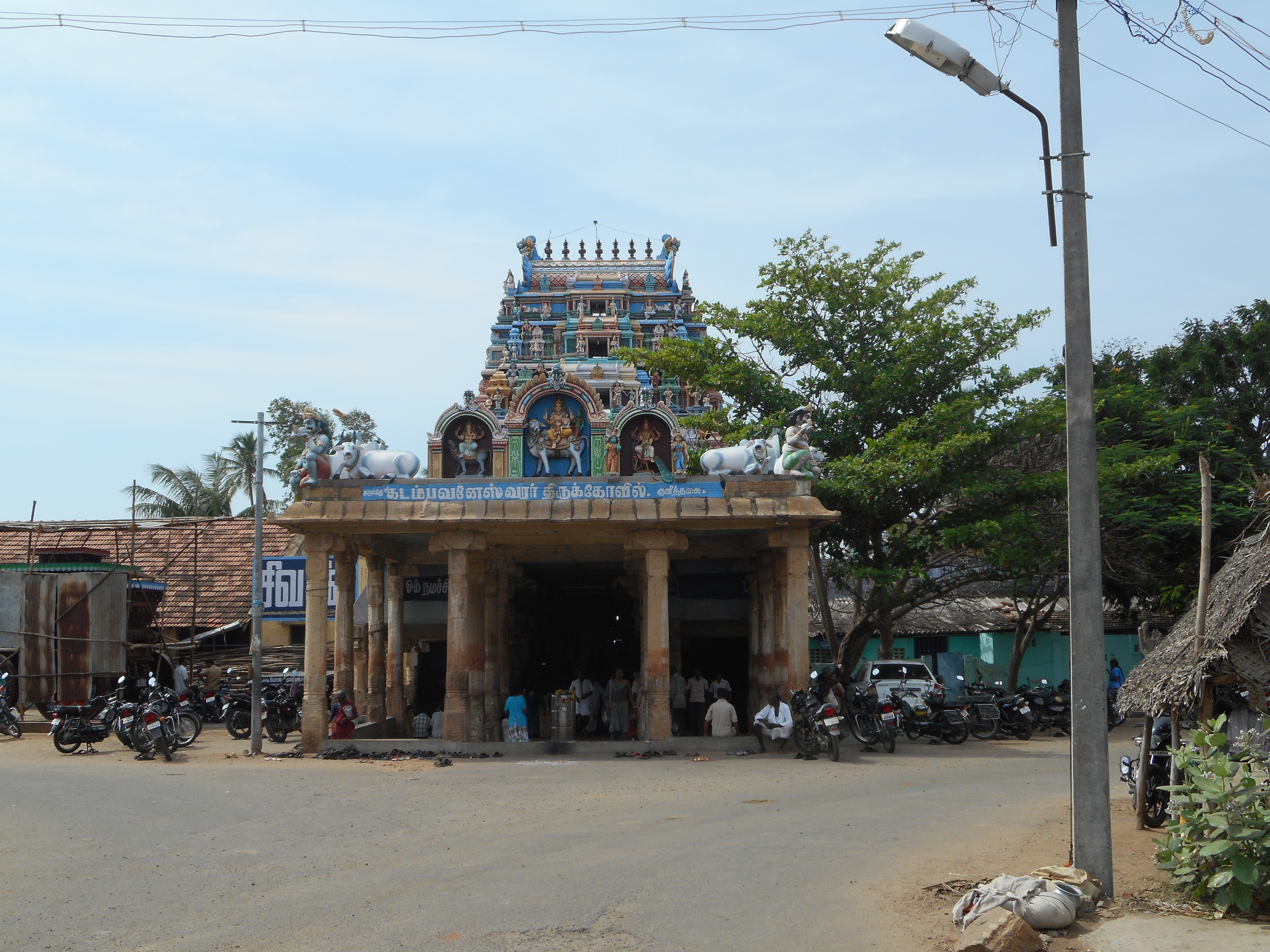
The entrance of the temple

Kulittalai Kadambavaneswarar Temple (குளித்தலை கடம்பவனேஸ்வரர் கோயில்) is a Hindu temple located at Karur district of Tamil Nadu, India. The presiding deity is Shiva. He is called as Kadambavaneswarar. His consort is Mutrila Mulaiammai.

== Significance ==
It is one of the shrines of the 275 Paadal Petra Sthalams. Thirunavukkarasar have sung hymns in praise of the temple. It is believed that Shiva appeared for sage Kanva in the Kadamba forest and hence the place came to be known as Kadambanthurai. It is also counted among the many temples on the banks of river Cauvery.
