= Yerpedu =

Village in Andhra Pradesh, India

- Village
- Yerpedu Railway station name board

- Location in Andhra Pradesh, India Yerpedu (India)
- Coordinates: 13.6833°N 79.6°E
- Country: India
- State: Andhra Pradesh
- District: Tirupati district

Government
  - Body: Village panchayat, Tirupati Urban Development Authority(TUDA)

Languages
  - Official: Telugu
- Time zone: UTC+5:30 (IST)
- Vehicle registration: AP

Yerpedu (or Erpedu) is a village in Yerpedu mandal, Tirupati district of Andhra Pradesh in India. is located near Sri Kalahasti. It is the mandal headquarters of Yerpedu mandal. It falls in the jurisdictional limit of Tirupati Urban Development Authority. IISER Tirupati and IIT Tirupati are both located in Yerpedu.

== Geography ==
Yerpedu is located at 13.6833°N 79.6°E. It has an average elevation of 89 metres (292 ft). It is 25 kms away from Tirupati. The distance to Sri Kalahasti is about 20Km. Yerpedu railway station is situated here.

== Demographics ==
the total population recorded in 2011 was 58,403, comprising 28,131 males and 28,272 females. The overall literacy rate in 2011 was 62.97%, with male literacy at 74.67% and female literacy at 51.17%. The PIN code of the area is 517619.
