= Velliangiri Mountains =

Part of the Western Ghats in Tamil Nadu, India

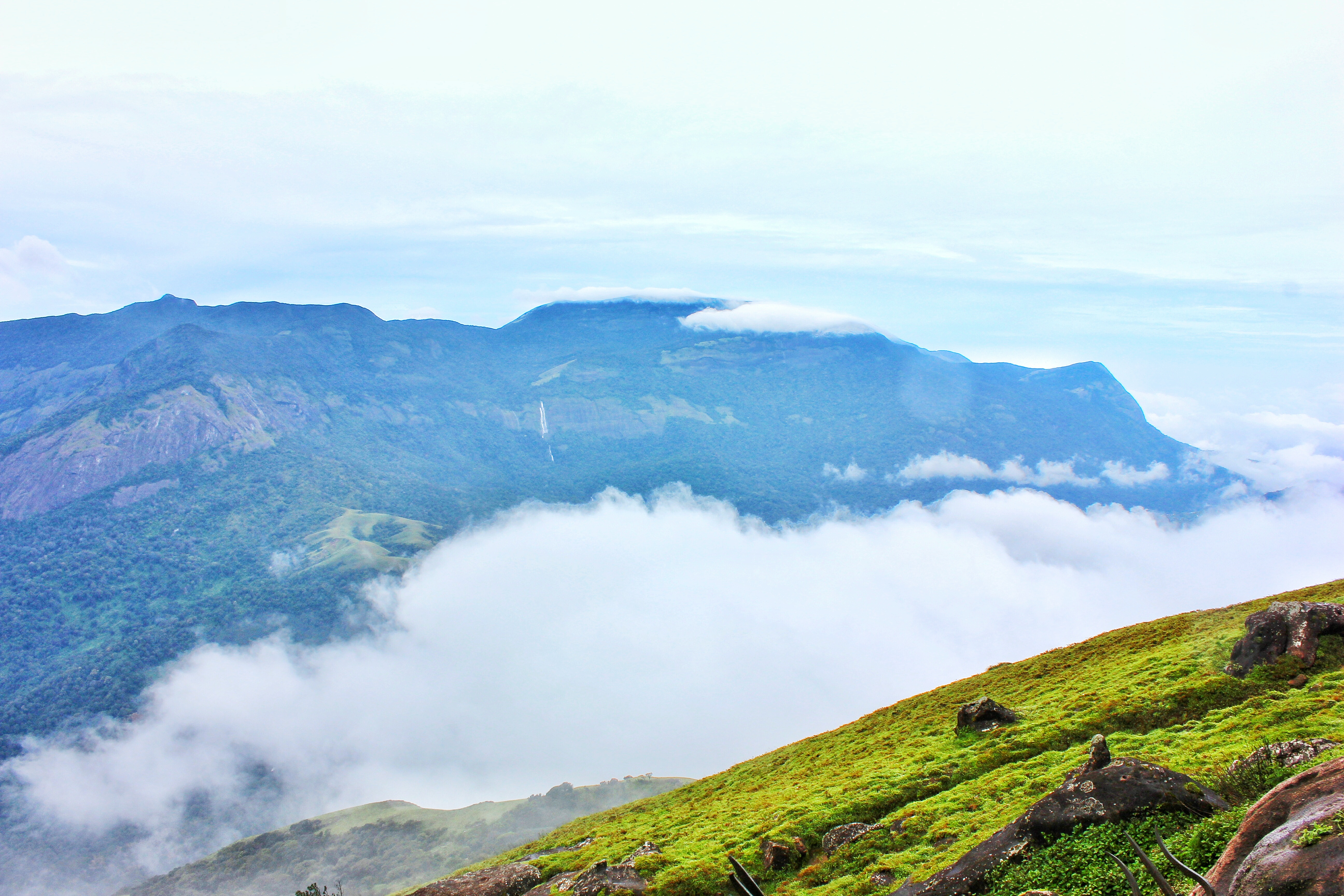

- Location in Tamil Nadu

Religion
- Affiliation: Hinduism
- District: Coimbatore
- Deity: Shiva
- Festivals: Tamil New year, Chitra Pournami, Karthikai Deepam

Location
- Location: Border of Coimbatore, Coimbatore District and Mannarkad taluk Palakkad district
- State: Tamil Nadu
- Country: India
- Coordinates: 10.9888°N 76.6873°E

Architecture
- Creator: Natural formation
- Elevation: 1,778 m (5,833 ft)

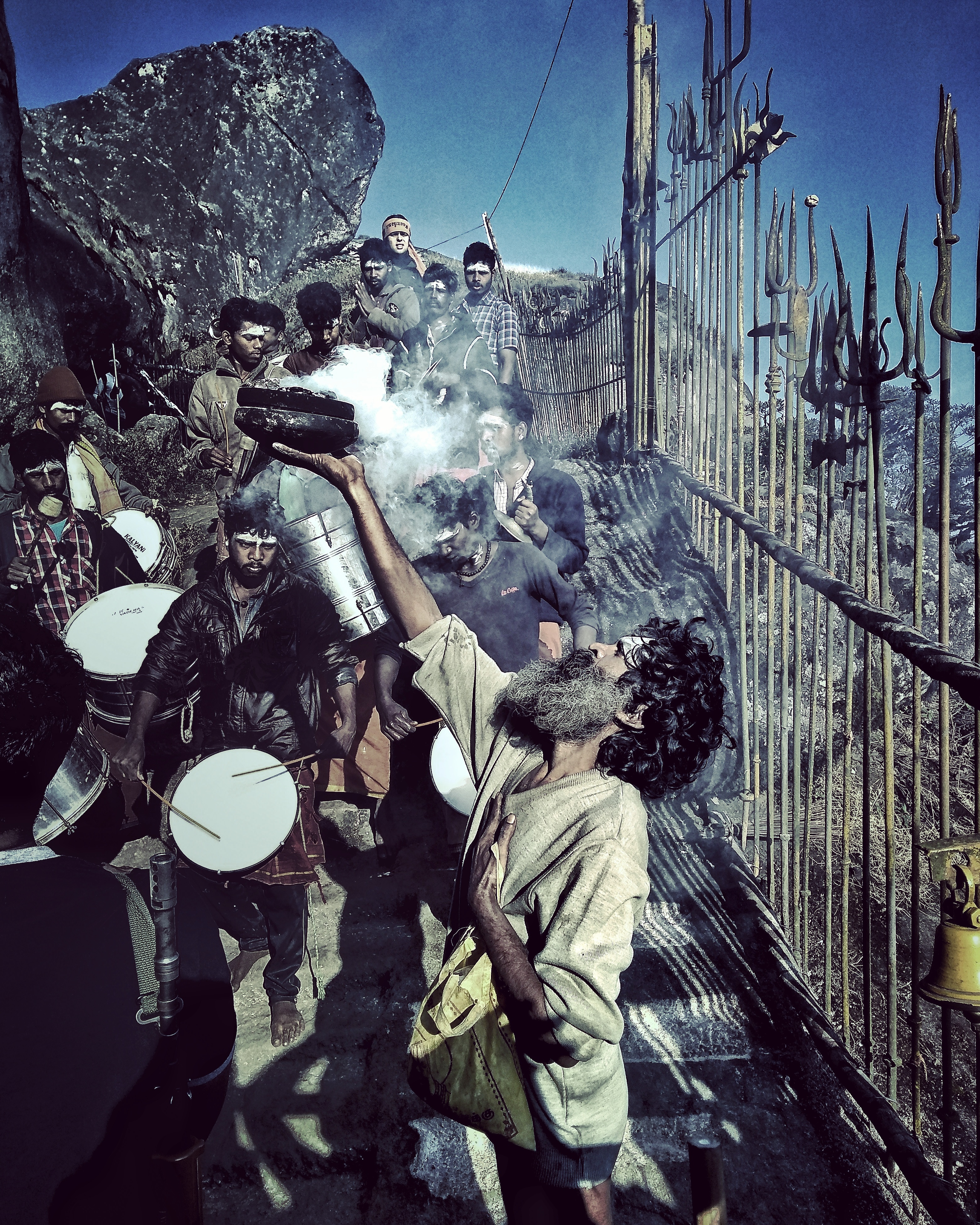
Top of The Hill

The Velliangiri Mountains, a part of the Nilgiri Biosphere Reserve are in the Western Ghats of Coimbatore district, Tamil Nadu.

== Geography ==
The Velliangiri hills form a major high in the Western Ghats in the Nilgiri Biosphere Reserve. The seven hills with altitudes ranging from 520 m – 1840 m are bordered by the plains of Coimbatore district to the east, the Palakad district of Kerala on the western boundary, the Nilgiri mountains to the north, and the Siruvani hills on the southern boundary. The annual rainfall is quite variable in the hills (500 mm – 7000 mm) with temperatures ranging from 15 °C during winter to 41 °C in the summer. Many seasonal rivers such as the Neelivaikal, Mayar or Andisunai traverse the hilly landscape. The Noyyal river originating from Velliangiri hills is one of the major tributaries of the Cauvery, which irrigates about 100,000 of hectares of agricultural land in the plains. The Velliangiri hills watershed feeds into the Siruvani dam, which is the main drinking water supply for 1,500,000 people in the urban centre of Coimbatore.
