= Nagorik (TV channel) =

Bangladeshi TV channel

- Country: Bangladesh
- Broadcast area: Nationwide
- Headquarters: Khilkhet, Dhaka

Programming
- Language: Bengali
- Picture format: 1080i HDTV (downscaled to 16:9 576i for SDTV sets)

Ownership
- Owner: Jadoo Media Limited
- Parent: Mohammadi Group
- Key people: Rubana Huq (chairman)

History
- Launched: 1 March 2018; 8 years ago
- Founder: Annisul Huq

Links
- Website: nagorik.com

Nagorik (Bengali: নাগরিক; lit. 'citizen') is a Bangladeshi Bengali-language privately owned satellite and cable television channel owned by Jadoo Media Limited, a subsidiary of the Mohammadi Group. It is based in Khilkhet, Dhaka, and began operations on 1 March 2018, with the slogan, "Television Noy, Somporko" (টেলিভিশন নয়, সম্পর্ক; lit. 'Not television, but a relationship'). Nagorik claims that they do not compete with local Bangladeshi television channels, and instead compete with foreign television channels by working with the local ones.

== History ==
=== Licensing and initiation ===
Nagorik was initially licensed to Jadoo Media Limited, which at the time was owned by businessman Annisul Huq, by the Bangladesh Telecommunication Regulatory Commission in 2013 as 'JadooTV'. During its initiation, Nagorik had produced several television series to be aired for later. Abdun Noor Tushar later joined the channel as its CEO. The channel received its frequency allocation in January 2015.

=== Launch ===
Nagorik began test transmissions on 6 February 2018, and later officially began broadcasting on 1 March of the same year at 19:00 (BST), with its debut program being "Swapno Simahin", being inaugurated at the Bangabandhu International Conference Center in Dhaka.

During its launch, Rubana Huq, the wife of Annisul Huq and the managing director of Nagorik, recalled the memory of her late husband. Tofail Ahmed, the Minister of Commerce, hoped that Nagorik "would care for the spirit of the Liberation War and highlight the development of Bangladesh." Minister of Information Hasanul Haq Inu also hoped that the channel would meet the demands of its audience. The channel's initial programming line consisted of four drama television series, a live music show Nagorik Café, an animated series Superman, a health-related series Deho Ghori, a cooking show Mariar Rannaghor, travel series Soleman Hazari, and many more.

=== Post-launch ===
Alongside Bangladesh Television and Maasranga Television, the channel was FIFA's official broadcast partner in Bangladesh for the 2018 World Cup. Another animated series, Batman: The Animated Series, premiered on Nagorik on 1 August 2018. On 27 October 2018, Nagorik began airing Chacha Bahinir Ajob Kahini, which is considered to be the first CGI animated television series to be produced in Bangladesh. The Indian historical drama series, Siyaasat, premiered on Nagorik on 3 November 2018. On 4 December 2018, the dance reality television series Bajlo Jhumur Tarar Nupur premiered on Nagorik. In February 2019, Nagorik premiered local drama series Bangi Television. On 17 March 2019, Turkish drama series Siyah İnci premiered on the channel under the name Maria. In December 2019, Nagorik, along with three other Bangladeshi television channels, signed an agreement with UNICEF to air programming regarding children's issues.

To celebrate Eid al-Fitr of 2020, Nagorik broadcast seven Hollywood films, including the ones from the Spider-Man, Terminator, and Charlie's Angels film franchises. Chander Hat, starring actor and director Salauddin Lavlu, premiered on Nagorik on 2 December 2020. On 1 March 2021, Turkish drama Binbir Gece, with its title being localized as Sahasra Ek Rajani, premiered on the channel. It was also made available for streaming on Bongo BD. In June 2021, two local dramas, Corporate Bhalobasha and Google Village, debuted on Nagorik.

On 5 April 2024, The International Cricket Council announced that it awarded ICC cricket rights in Bangladesh to TSM for two years, exploiting linear television rights via Nagorik, along with digital rights via Banglalink. During this time, Nagorik was the sole broadcaster of ICC cricket tournaments in Bangladesh. Nagorik began airing four series from Bongo BD in July 2026, namely Para+Cetamol 500mg, Musibot Reloaded, Sondeher Obokash, and Open Kitchen. On 2 August 2026, through a joint initiative by the channel and Bongo BD, Kudüs Fatihi Selahaddin Eyyubi premiered on both platforms under the localised title Sultan Salahuddin Ayyubi.

== Programming ==
Nagorik's programming line is diverse, consisting of dramas, music, health, cartoons, and many more. At its launch, four dramas have premiered on the channel.

=== List of programming ===
==== Drama ====
- Akash Meghe Dhaka
- Ami Tumi Se
- Bangi Television
- Candy Crush
- Chander Hat
- Corporate Bhalobasha
- Ek Pa Du Pa
- Google Village
- Josnamoyi
- Lipstick
- Shoshur Aloy Modhur Aloy

==== Acquired ====
- Binbir Gece (title localized as Sahasra Ek Rajani)
- Kudüs Fatihi Selahaddin Eyyubi (title localized as Sultan Salahuddin Ayyubi)
- Siyaasat (title localized as Samrat Jahangir)
- Siyah İnci (title localized as Maria)

==== Animated ====
- Batman: The Animated Series
- Chacha Bahinir Ajob Kahini
- Superman: The Animated Series

==== Cooking ====
- Mariar Rannaghor
- Rannar Expert

==== Health ====
- Deho Ghori
- Shustho Desh Shustho Mon

==== Infotainment ====
- Bizzcussion
- Bola Na Bola
- F.I.R.
- Fisfas
- Jogfol
- Nagorik Binodon
- Samadhan Jatra
- Soleman Hazari

==== Lifestyle ====
- Ghore Baire
- Pothe Prantore

==== Musical ====
- Bajlo Jhumur Tarar Nupur
- Banglabaul
- Gaan Baksho
- House Views
- Music Café
- Nagorik Café
