= Eeshna Gupta =

Indian politician and social worker

- Born: 2000 or 2001 (age 24–25)
- Education: Krea University
- Occupations: Politician, social worker
- Political party: Aam Aadmi Party

Eeshna Gupta is an Indian politician and social worker from Delhi. She is a member of the Aam Aadmi Party (AAP) and co-in-charge of the Delhi unit of the party's student wing, the Association of Students for Alternative Politics (ASAP).

Gupta graduated from Krea University and worked on civic issues in South Delhi before she ran for office. In 2025, aged 24, she contested the Greater Kailash ward in the Municipal Corporation of Delhi by-elections and lost to Anjum Mandal of the Bharatiya Janata Party. Through 2026, she ran an AAP help centre in Zamrudpur and took part in student protests in the capital.

== Early life and education ==
Gupta grew up in South Delhi in a family of doctors who had no political background. She graduated from Krea University after studying social studies. As a student, she joined the core team of Youth for Climate India.

== Career ==
Gupta started doing social work as a teenager. Before she entered electoral politics, she spent several years working on civic issues in South Delhi, where she volunteered with resident and market associations and organised cleanliness drives. Her work dealt with gender, education and social justice, and included marginalised communities such as slum residents. She also volunteered with the Centre for Gender and Politics, a South Asian organisation focused on women's participation in politics.

On 20 May 2025, AAP convenor Arvind Kejriwal launched ASAP as the party's student wing. Gupta is one of its core members. She announced its membership drive at a press conference that May. Gupta said that student politics had long ignored the unemployment and financial difficulties faced by students.

In September, she opposed a Delhi University rule that required candidates for the Delhi University Students' Union to submit a ₹1 lakh surety bond signed by a parent. The rule came after the Delhi High Court struck down an earlier bond. Gupta argued that the new condition would keep poorer students, women and students from marginalised backgrounds out of campus elections.

In November 2025, AAP named Gupta as its candidate for Greater Kailash (Ward 173), a seat reserved for women. It was one of twelve Municipal Corporation of Delhi wards where by-elections were held on 30 November, after their councillors left for the Delhi Legislative Assembly or Parliament. She ran against Anjum Mandal of the BJP and Garvit Singhvi of the Indian National Congress, and lost to Mandal. Her campaign proposed a complaints app for residents and door-to-door waste segregation, and she opposed plans to build a private hospital in a residential part of the ward.

In 2026, Gupta worked from an office in Zamrudpur that also served as an AAP seva kendra, where residents came for help with documents, school admissions and government services. ASAP also set up an admissions help desk for students outside the Arts Faculty of Delhi University. In July, she said the Cockroach Janta Party protests were a sign that Generation Z could influence national politics. The following month, she was appointed co-in-charge of ASAP's Delhi unit.

In August 2026, Gupta said that ASAP would contest the Delhi University Students' Union elections and that "money and muscle" would no longer persuade students. During the campaign, she asked the university to build hostels and to pay for paying-guest accommodation until they were built.

ASAP took part in protests against the Chief Election Commissioner, Gyanesh Kumar. According to Gupta, police detained her and other members on 2 and 3 October 2026 and held them at the Badarpur and Najafgarh police stations. On 6 October, she said that ASAP would join other student groups in a march to Jantar Mantar to demand Kumar's resignation and the withdrawal of the Special Intensive Revision of electoral rolls. The next day, the wing joined the Cockroach Janta Party, the All India Students' Association, the Students' Federation of India and the All India Students' Federation in calling for the march on 10 October. The New Indian Express reported that Gupta was put under house arrest the night before the march.

== Political views ==
Gupta has spoken about the low representation of women in India's legislatures. She has called for mentoring, leadership training and the selection of candidates on merit so that more women and first-time entrants take part in politics. She supports extending the reservation of seats for women in panchayats and municipalities to state assemblies and Parliament.

In May 2025, Gupta and Reena Gupta, a secretary of AAP's Delhi unit, co-wrote an opinion column for NDTV. They argued that the paperwork needed for narrowly targeted welfare schemes kept out eligible people, and that simpler, universal schemes would reach them better.
