= Mohammadi Group of Companies Limited =

- Formation: 1972
- Headquarters: Dhaka, Bangladesh
- Official language: Bengali
- Website: mohammadi-group.com

Mohammadi Group of Companies Limited (Bengali: মোহাম্মদী গ্রুপ অব কোম্পানিজ লিমিটেড) is a Bangladeshi diversified conglomerate based in Dhaka with a focus on the Garments industry. Mir Mosharref Hossain Pakbir is the chairman of the group.

Amin-Ud-Dowla, son of the founder Seraj-Ud-Dowla, is the managing director of Mohammadi Group of Companies Limited. Md. Harunur Rashid is a director of Mohammadi Group of Companies Limited.

== History ==
Mohammadi Group of Companies Limited was established in 1972 by the Seraj-Ud-Dowla. Annisul Huq served as the managing director and later left the group to establish his own company, Mohammadi Group. Dowla established the Subarna Sari Ghar in Gausia Super Market, Dhaka. He went to established Mohammadi Housing Society and Mohammadi Housing Limited. Mohammadi Housing Society is located in Mohammadpur, Dhaka and is home to 12 thousand residents. The residential area borders the PC Culture Housing Society.

Seraj-Ud-Dowla, chairman of Mohammadi Group of Companies Limited, established Mohammadi Apparels Limited, one of the first garments factory in Bangladesh after Desh Group established Desh Garments. M/s. Al-Amin Seatrans Ltd sued M/s. Loyal Shipping Pvt, Ltd, owner of M.V, Loyal Bird, after the ship was impounded in Kolkata after being seized in Haldia Port. Seraj-Ud-Dowla was chairman of both companies.

Mohammadi Group established Alamin Sea-Trans Limited, Loyal Shipping Limited, Ben Loyd Shipping Line Limited, and Mohammadi Sea Ways Limited to enter the shipping industry. Seraj-Ud-Dowla was a founding director of Islami Bank Bangladesh Limited. He served as a director of Al-Arafah Islami Bank Limited.

After the death of Seraj-Ud-Dowla in 2011, Mir Mosharref Hossain became chairman of the group. He is a director and writer of The Daily Observer (Bangladesh). He founded Mohammadi News Agency in 1996. He is a sponsor of Bangabandhu Shishu Kishore Mela. He is also the vice-chairman of the Democracy Research Centre. Md. Harunur Rashid is a director of Mohammadi Group of Companies Limited and the chairman of The National H.R. Laboratories Limited.

== Businesses ==
- Mohammadi News Agency
- Kishore Bangla
- Mohammadi Housing Society
- Fiftytwo Digital Ltd
- Mohammadi Housing Limited
- Mohammadi Apparels Limited
- Alamin Sea-Trans Limited
- Loyal Shipping Limited
- Ben Loyd Shipping Line Limited
- Mohammadi Sea Ways Limited
- Mohammadi Stock Market Limited
- Mohammadi Developers Limited
- Mohammadi Homes Limited
- Mohammadi Air Travels Limited
- TimeNow Limited
- Mohammadi Trade International
- Mohammadi Shipping Limited
- Mohammadi Lawyers Limited
- Mohammadi Farms Limited
- REBUS Media Limited
