= Tara Muzik =

Bengali entertainment TV channel

- Country: India
- Broadcast area: India; Bangladesh
- Headquarters: Kolkata, West Bengal, India

Programming
- Language: Bengali
- Picture format: 576i SDTV

Ownership
- Owner: Saradha Group
- Sister channels: Tara Newz; TV Southasia

History
- Launched: 21 February 2005; 21 years ago
- Closed: 12 May 2013; 13 years ago

Links
- Website: www.taratv.com

Tara Muzik was an Indian Bengali-language satellite and cable music-oriented television channel owned by the Saradha Group, a chit fund company. It was launched on 21 February 2005, as the first Bengali-language music-oriented channel in the world, after being split from Tara Bangla, which was launched on 28 April 2000. Tara Muzik was targeted to Bengali-speaking audiences in both India and Bangladesh. It is broadcast from Tara's headquarters in Salt Lake, Kolkata. Due to financial reasons, the channel was shut down on 12 May 2013.

== History ==
In 2000, Doordarshan and later Star TV's former head, Rathikant Basu, established TARA, which stood for Television Aimed at Regional Audiences. The network comprised four regional television channels in Bengali, Punjabi, Gujarati, and Marathi languages, all of which besides the Bengali one have shut down because of financial losses. On 21 February 2005, Tara exited the general entertainment genre due to stiff competition from its rivals, such as ETV Bangla and Alpha Bangla, and split Tara Bangla into two television channels, Tara Newz and Tara Muzik, devoted to news and music programming respectively. Within less than a month after its launch, Tara Muzik had the second-highest viewership among Bengali-language television channels in India, behind only ETV Bangla. In 2010, Saradha Group acquired the two channels from Broadcast Worldwide, which owned the Tara television network.

=== Financial crisis and shutdown ===
In early 2013, Tara Muzik suspended regular programming and began airing repeat telecasts due to financial reasons. On 14 April 2013, they, along with its sisters, Tara Newz and TV Southasia, were given a closure notice, leading to employees who refused to shut the channels down breaking down on live television. According to general manager Indrajit Roy, Saradha Group, the owners of the three channels, were no longer willing to fund them. However, Tara Muzik resumed broadcasting as there was a campaign to save the three channels from shutting down, until the channel itself ceased doing so on 12 May 2013. Later, West Bengal's then chief minister, Mamata Banerjee, announced to acquire both Tara Muzik and Tara Newz, but a TRAI order banning Indian state governments from acquiring television channels halted the acquisition.

== Programming ==
- Aaj Sakaler Amontrone
- Amar Rabindranath
- Amar Shahar
- Anya Durga
- Bhalo Achi, Bhalo Theko
- Doctor Online
- Ganbhashi Live
- Hanrir Khabar
- Live Mon Niye
- Sab Jane Janata
- Take a Break Live

== See also ==
- Tara Newz
- TV Southasia
