= Mohammadi Group =

Bangladeshi conglomerate company

- Formation: 1986
- Headquarters: Dhaka, Bangladesh
- Region served: Bangladesh
- Official language: Bengali
- Website: www.mohammadigroup.com

Mohammadi Group (Bengali: মোহাম্মদী গ্রুপ) is a Bangladeshi diversified conglomerate based in Dhaka with a focus on the garments industry. It was founded by Annisul Huq. Rubana Huq is the Chairperson of Mohammadi Group. Navidul Huq is a Managing Director of the Mohammadi Group.

== History ==
Mohammadi Group was established in 1986 by Annisul Huq. It started with a single factory that had 52 workers. Before that Huq was working as the managing director of the Mohammadi Group of Companies Limited. The other founders of the group were Faruk-Al-Nasir and Habibur Rahman.

Annisul Huq, Chairman of Mohammadi Group, contested the Bangladesh Garment Manufacturers and Exporters Association president election in 1998.

In 1999, Mohammadi Group established TechnoVista Limited. In 2000, Annisul Huq said that the garments industry was losing 2 billion taka a day due to strike (hartal) in Chittagong.

The Mohammadi Limited (Sample) was established as a sample making factory for the group in 2002. It also established Mohammadi Fashion Sweaters Limited in Khilkhet Kha para.

Mohammadi Group established a garment factory called Mohammadi Group Limited in 2003. Its clients include Costco, ECI New York, H&M, Haggar Clothing, Perry Ellis, Primark, Sears, Springfield, and Walmart. The Government of Denmark provided 26.5 million taka to Technovista Limited through the Danida Private Sector Development Programme. The ambassador of Denmark to Bangladesh, Niels Severin Munk, and chairman of Mohammadi Group Annisul Huq.

The Group established Desh Energy Limited in 2005. It owns Desh Cambridge Kumargaon Power Company Limited which operates a 10 megawatt powerplant at Kumargaon. It also owns Desh Energy Chandpur Power Company Limited which operates a 200 megawatt powerplant in Chandpur District. MG Knit Flair Limited was established in 2005 in Gazipur District. MG Sweater Sample was established in Khilkhet Kha para in 2005. Mohammadi Group established MG Shirtex Limited in 2005. It clients include Costco, H&M, Sears, and Walmart. From December 2005 to July 2006, Annisul Huq, Chairman of Mohammadi Group, was the president of the Bangladesh Garment Manufacturers and Exporters Association.

TechnoVista Limited created a joint venture called BordingVista Limited with Boarding group, a company of Denmark, in 2007 which was later renamed to Fiftytwo Digital Limited in 2019. In 2007, teams from project D-Youth visited the group in Nikunja. In 2007, Bangladesh Garment Manufacturers and Exporters Association nominated chairman of Mohammadi Group Annisul Huq to be president of Federation of Bangladesh Chambers of Commerce & Industries.

Students of Theatre Department of Jahangirnagar University performed at the factory of the group in May 2008.

Mohammadi Group established MG Niche Flair Limited in 2015. Its chairman, Annisul Huq, served as the president of Bangladesh Garment Manufacturers and Exporters Association and Federation of Bangladesh Chambers of Commerce & Industries. Rubana Huq received the Bangladesh Business Awards from DHL Express in 2015.

Mohammadi Group launched Jadoo Digital in April 2016 as a digital cable operator. MG Niche Flair Limited (Woven) was established in 2016. MG Niche Stitch Limited was established in 2016. The group signed an agreement with Asian University for Women to send employees, selected through tests, for higher education on scholarship. In December 2017, chairman, Annisul Huq died who was then Mayor of North Dhaka.

In 2018, it was exporting three million sweaters a year.

Chairperson Rubana Huq is a founding member of Bangladesh-Türkiye Business Forum. In 2019, its chairman Rubana Huq became the first female president of the Bangladesh Garment Manufacturers and Exporters Association. Navidul Huq was the managing director of the group. In 2021, Faruque Hassan, replaced her as president of the Bangladesh Garment Manufacturers and Exporters Association; Hasan was the managing director of Giant Group. She asked garment workers to not complain to foreigners. The group received 20 to 25 billion taka in subsidies from the government for electricity generation. It signed an agreement with Bangladesh Power Development Board to build a powerplant in Hatiya for 13.96 billion taka to be paid to Desh Energy over a 15-year period.

The group operates a subsidized store for its garment workers.

== Businesses ==
- Jadoo Media Limited (Nagorik TV)
- Digi Jadoo Broadband Limited - Jadoo Digital
- Desh Energy Limited
- Desh Cambridge Kumargaon Power Company Limited
- Desh Energy Chandpur Power Company Limited
- MG Properties Limited
- TechnoVista Limited
- Fiftytwo Digital Limited
- MG Shirtex Limited
- Mohammadi Group Limited
- Mohammadi Limited (Sample)
- Mohammadi Fashion Sweaters Limited
- MG Knit Flair Limited
- MG Sweater Sample
- MG Niche Flair Limited
- MG Niche Stitch Limited
- MG Niche Flair Limited (Woven)
