= Tara Thiagarajan =

Neuroscientist

Dr. Tara Thiagarajan
- Born: Tara Thiagarajan
- Occupation(s): Neuroscientist and Entrepreneur
- Years active: 2000–present

Tara Thiagarajan is the founder and Chief Scientist of Sapien Labs, which has developed the MHQ and the Mental Health Million and Human Brain Diversity Projects.

== Background ==
Thiagarajan leads scientific research work focused on the impact of environment on the brain and mind. This research has shown that aspects of brain dynamics change systematically with the stimulus environment including education, travel and cell phone use and has described the global decline in mental wellbeing across younger generations and uncovered various of its key drivers.

She was also the founder, Chairman and Managing Director of Madura Microfinance, a microfinance company operating across India which was known for its high cost efficiency and innovative thought leadership. Madura Microfinance was recently merged with Credit Access Grameen. While at Madura Microfinance she produced the film Shakti Rising (Shakti Pirakkudu) on the journey of a rural woman. In 2022, she joined the Governing Council of Krea University in India

== Early life and education ==
She holds a PhD in Neuroscience from Stanford University and also completed her undergraduate degree in Mathematics at Brandeis University.

== See also ==
- Mental health
- Prevalence of mental disorders
- Global mental health
- Prevalence of mental disorders
- Emotional resilience
- World Mental Health Day
- Mental health during the COVID-19 pandemic
- Social determinants of mental health
- Mental environment
