= Kamal Ahmad =

American educator and social entrepreneur (born 1965)

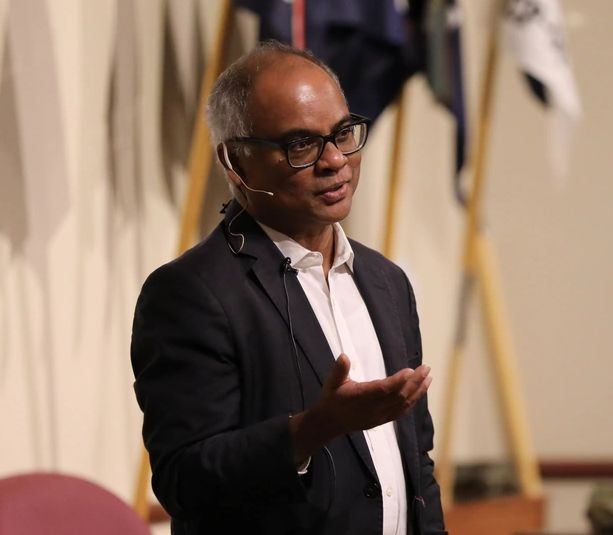
- Kamal Ahmad
- Born: 1965 (age 60–61); Dhaka
- Occupations: Educator and Social entrepreneur

Kamal Ahmad (born 1965) is a Bangladesh-born, now U.S. national, educator and social entrepreneur. He led the creation of the Asian University for Women located in Chittagong, Bangladesh in 2006.

== Early life ==
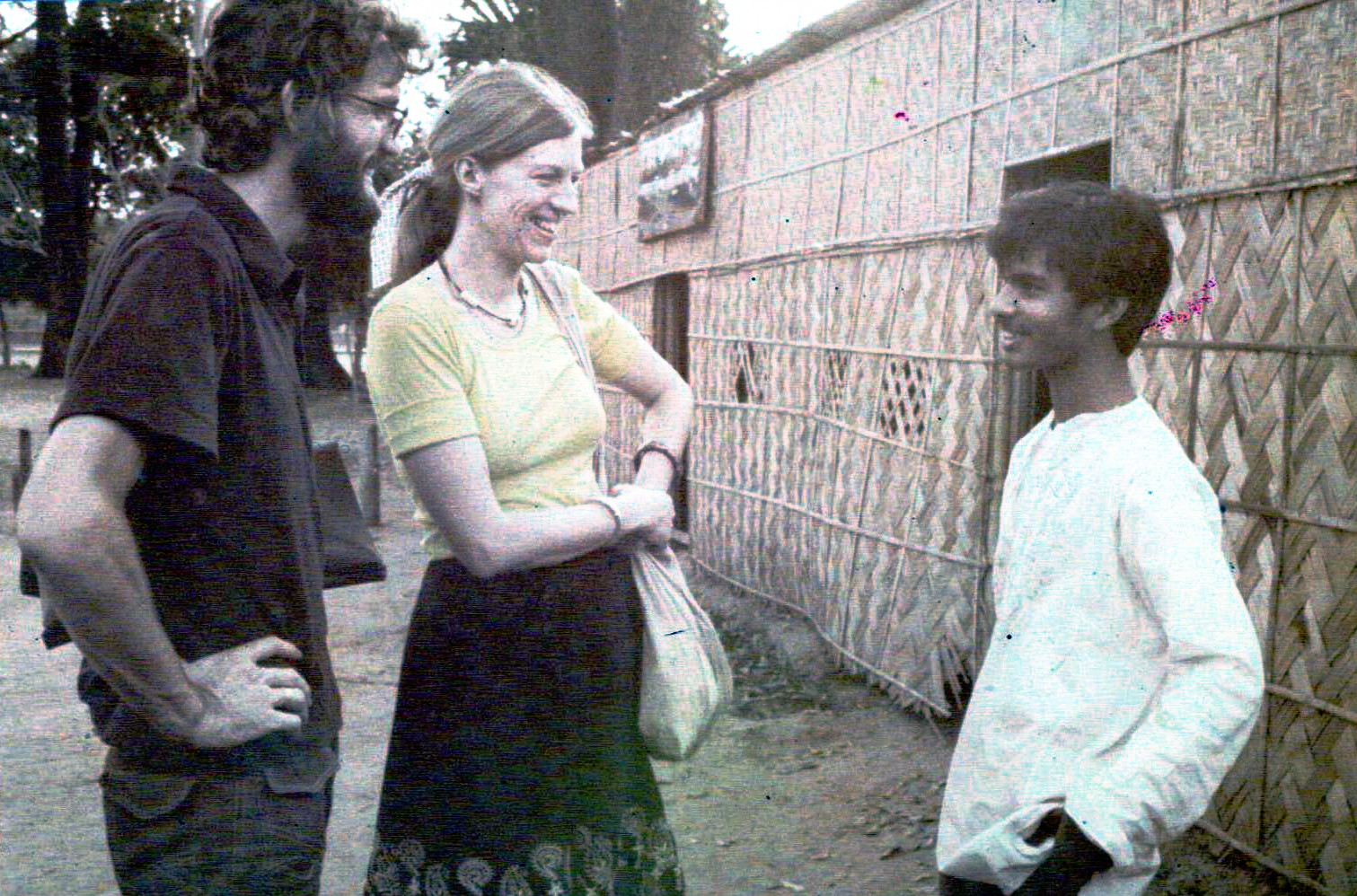
Kamal Ahmad with visitors from Terre des Hommes (France) in front of his first thatched bamboo school house, 1979

Ahmad was born in Dhaka, East Pakistan (now Bangladesh) to a family of educators.

At age 14, Ahmad established a series of internationally funded afternoon schools for adolescents who served as domestic workers in Dhaka.

Ahmad moved to the U.S. in 1980 to attend Phillips Exeter Academy. At Exeter, he led the Third World Society and the Student-Faculty Committee on Corporate Responsibility which focused on the question of corporate divestment from apartheid-era South Africa. Ahmad entered Harvard College in 1983. As a freshman, Ahmad founded and managed the Overseas Development Network, a consortium of 70 university student groups across the United States dedicated to the promotion of international development projects. In 1987, Ahmad won Time magazine's second annual College Achievement Award for "20 of the most outstanding juniors in America."

Dr. Derek Bok, then President of Harvard University, commented in his 1986 Commencement Address: “as one of those rare individuals who think, act, speak, and work with just one thing in mind: the welfare of the poor and the historically disenfranchised peoples of the world.”

== Family ==
Ahmad's father was Professor Kamaluddin Ahmad, a famed biochemist who pioneered the study of biochemistry and nutritional sciences in the Indian subcontinent.

Ahmad's grandfather, M.O. Ghani was one of the first Bengali-Indian Muslims to receive a Ph.D. in chemistry from the United Kingdom. He went on to become founder-vice chancellor of Bangladesh Agricultural University in Mymensingh, vice chancellor of the University of Dhaka, Pakistan's Ambassador to Tanzania and other East African countries, and an independent Member of Parliament in Bangladesh.

== Career ==
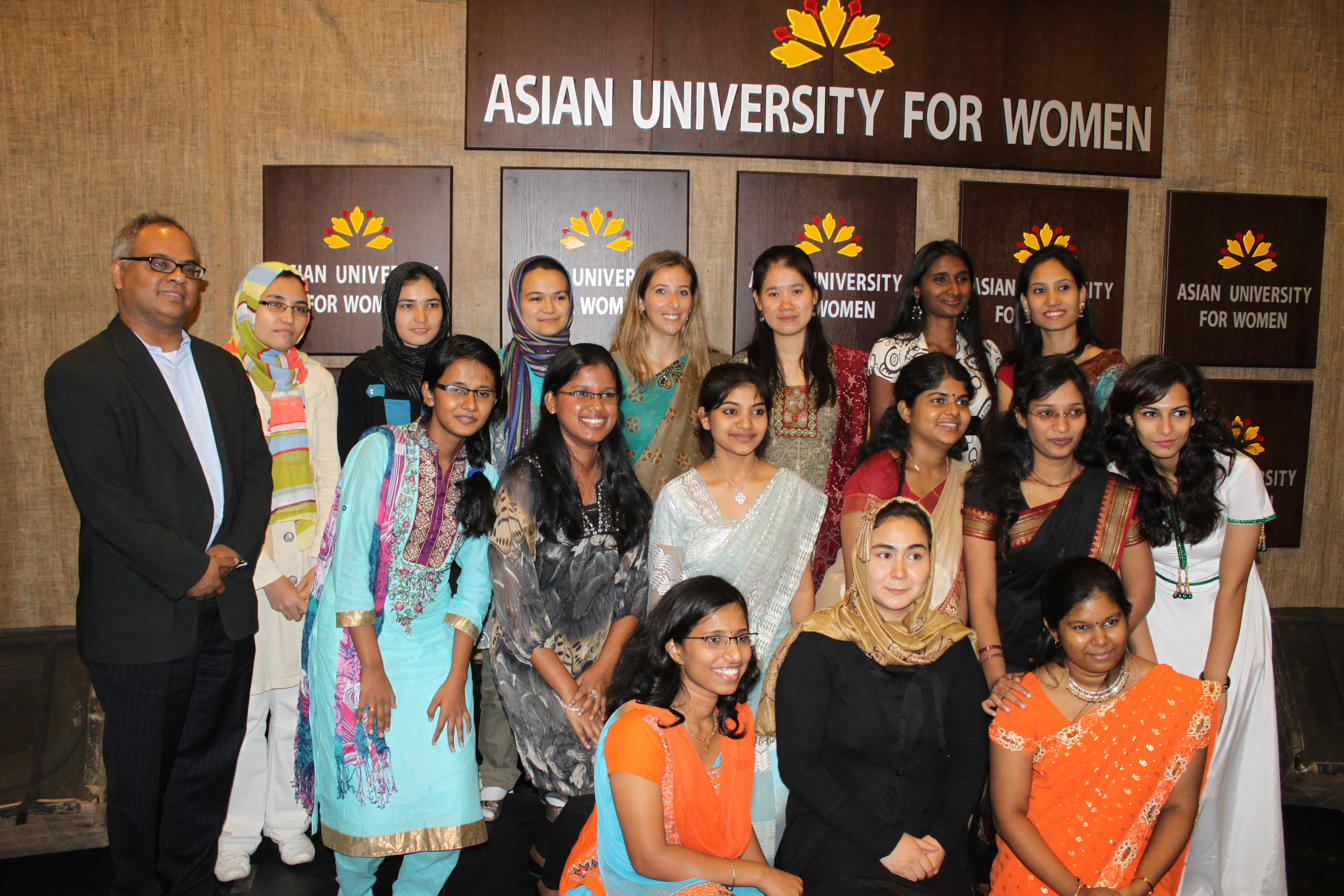
Kamal with AUW students.

In 1998, Ahmad conceived and co-directed the World Bank/UNESCO Task Force on Higher Education & Society.

In September 2006, the Parliament of Bangladesh ratified the landmark Charter of the Asian University for Women. The Charter endowed the university with institutional autonomy, academic freedom, and embedded it in the principle of non-discrimination. In 2005 and 2006, the Open Society Foundations and the Bill & Melinda Gates Foundation provided the start-up funds which enabled AUW to become operational in 2008.

In August 2021, Ahmad helped 148 AUW Afghan graduates and enrolled students who were in Aghanistan to be placed in the U.S. colleges and universities with full scholarships.

== Asian University for Women ==
AUW is chartered by the Parliament of Bangladesh as an independent international university. The Government of Bangladesh has granted 140 acres of land for a purpose-designed campus.

- Bloomberg: How These Women Barely Made It Out of Afghanistan (Podcast)
- Chronicle of Higher Education: I am Hopeful, and I am Heartbroken
- Harvard Magazine: The Taliban and Trauma
- New York Times: She’s at Brown. Her Heart’s Still in Kabul
- Sunday Times: Escape from Kabul: the female students who fled the Taliban

== Awards and affiliations ==
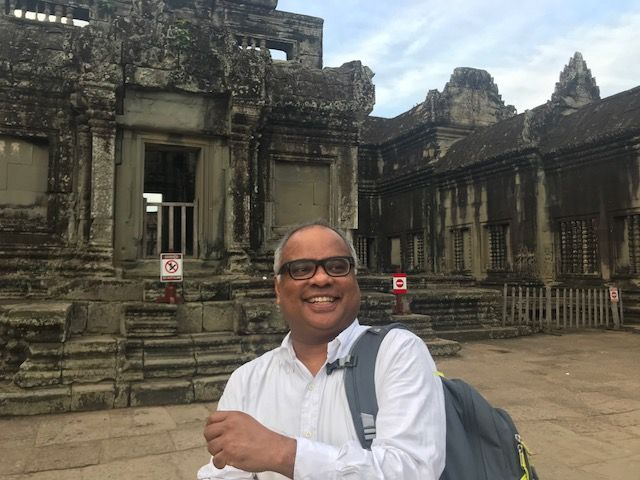
Kamal Ahmad at Angkor Wot, 2018

Ahmad is a recipient of a number of awards including the United Nations Gold Peace Medal & Citation Scroll, given by the Paul G. Hoffman Awards Fund for "outstanding contribution to national and international development." In 2002, Ahmad was elected as a "Global Leader for Tomorrow" by the World Economic Forum. Ahmad was also given the John Phillips Award from Phillips Exeter Academy, his alma mater. The award is given to "an alumnus or alumna of the academy, still living at the time of nomination, whose life demonstrates John Phillips' ideal of goodness and knowledge united in noble character and usefulness to mankind. It is the highest honor accorded by the academy to an alumnus.
