= Rubana Huq =

Bangladeshi businesswoman

Rubana Haque
- রুবানা হক
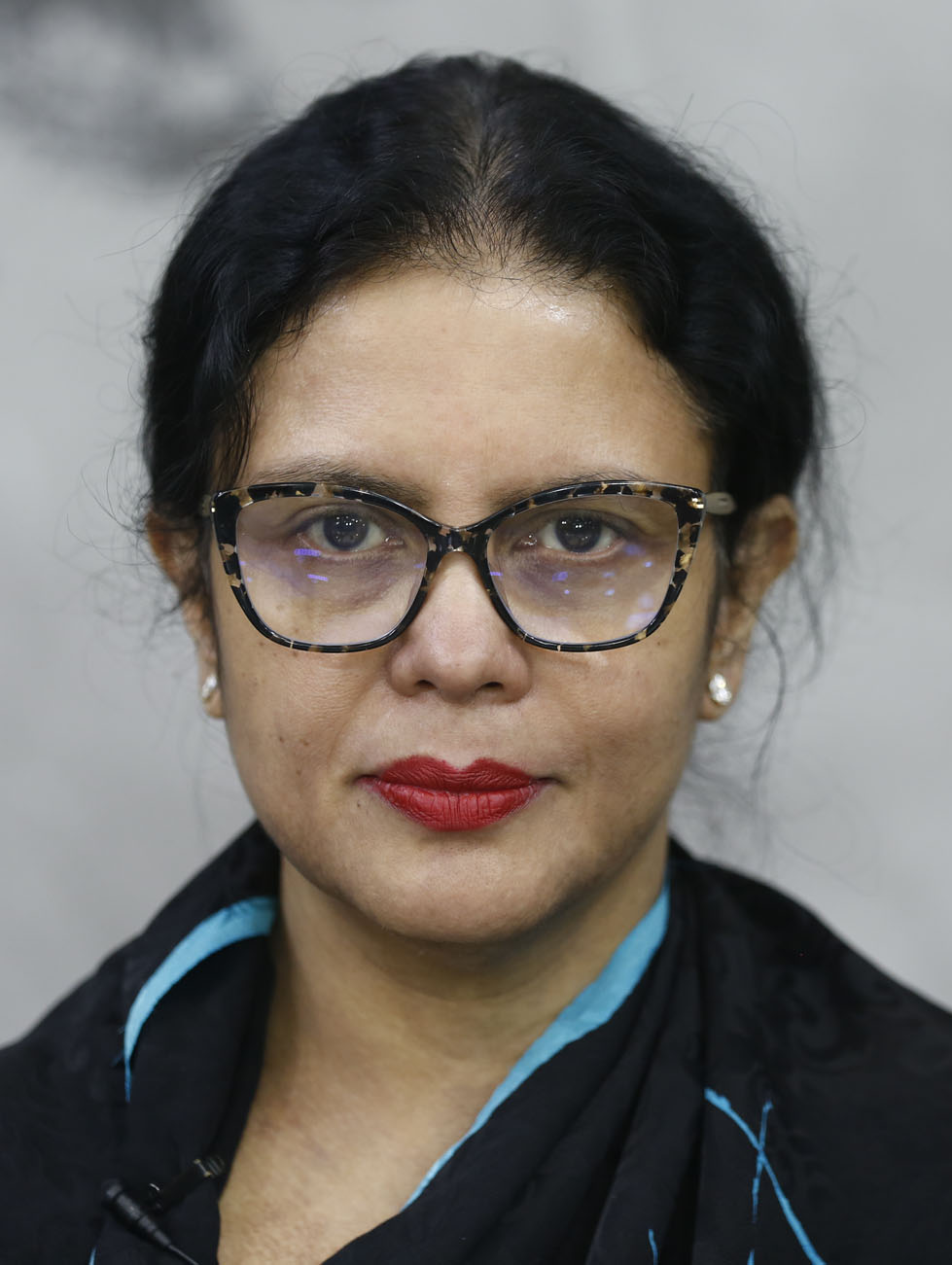
- Huq in April 2019

Vice-Chancellor of Asian University for Women
- Incumbent
- Assumed office 15 February 2022
- Chancellor: Cherie Blair
- Preceded by: Nirmala Rao

President of Bangladesh Garment Manufecturers and Exporters
- In office 12 April 2019 – 12 April 2021
- Preceded by: Siddiqur Rahman
- Succeeded by: Faruque Hassan

Personal details
- Born: 9 February 1964 (age 62) Dacca, East Pakistan, Pakistan (now Bangladesh)
- Spouse: Annisul Haque
- Education: East West University; Jadavpur University

Rubana Haque (Bengali: রুবানা হক; born 9 February 1964) is a Bangladeshi businesswoman, university academic and poet. She has been the Vice-chancellor of Asian University for Women (AUW) since February 2022.

Rubana is the chairperson of Mohammadi Group, a Bangladeshi conglomerate. She was featured in BBC 100 Women in 2013 and 2014. She was elected as the first female president of BGMEA served during 2019–2021.

== Early life and education ==
Rubana was born on 9 February in 1964 in Dhaka in the then East Pakistan (now Bangladesh). She was educated at Viqarunnisa Noon School and Holy Cross College. She completed her master's in English literature from East West University in 2008 and PhD from Jadavpur University in 2018.

== Career ==
From 1995 to 2017, Rubana served as managing director of the Mohammadi Group, a ready made garments conglomerate founded by her husband Annisul Haque. Rubana served as the chief executive officer of TV Southasia from 2006 to 2010.

In 2017, she became chairperson of the Mohammadi Group following Annisul's death.

In 2019, she became the first woman elected president of the Bangladesh Garment Manufacturers and Exporters Association (BGMEA). Rubana also serves on the boards of the BGMEA, the UNFCCC fashion charter, the Asian University for Women (AUW), and Gono Sahajjo Shangstha (GSS).

On 15 February 2022, Rubana became the Vice-chancellor of Asian University for Women and resigned as BGMEA President. She was replaced at the BGMEA by chairman of Crony Group, Neela Hosne Ara.

== Awards and recognitions ==
Rubana was recognized in the BBC 100 Women series in 2013 and 2014. In 2014, she was awarded the DHL-Daily Star Bangladesh Business Award for "Outstanding Business Women of The Year".

== Personal life ==
Rubana is widow of former Mayor of North Dhaka Anisul Haque. With him, she has three children.
