= Mahesh Rangarajan =

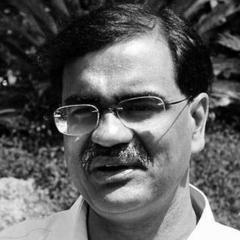
- Born: 22 April 1964 (age 62); New Delhi, India
- Education: St. Columba's School, Delhi, Hindu College, University of Delhi, Oxford University
- Scientific career
- Fields: Modern History, Environmental Studies, Environmental History
- Workplaces: Dean of Academic Affairs at Ashoka University, Nehru Memorial Museum and Library, Cornell University, Jadavpur university

Mahesh Rangarajan (born 22 April 1964) is a researcher, author and historian with a special interest in environmental history and colonial history of British and contemporary India. He has taught Environmental Studies and History at Ashoka University and Krea University, and served as the Vice Chancellor of Krea University. He appears frequently on Indian television as a political analyst. He is also a columnist in the print media writing on wildlife conservation, political and environmental issues. In 2010, he chaired the Elephant Task Force (Gajah) of the Indian Ministry of Environment and Forests. The Task Force was formed to formulate measures for the protection of elephants in India.

== Early life ==
Mahesh Rangarajan was born in New Delhi and finished his ICSE and ISC from St. Columba's School, Delhi. He then did a Bachelor of Arts in History (Honours) from Hindu College, University of Delhi. He received the Rhodes scholarship in 1986 to do a BA in Modern History from Balliol College at Oxford, which he finished in 1988. He graduated from Delhi university and then from Oxford each with First Class. He was awarded a doctorate (D.Phil.) in Modern History from Nuffield College, Oxford University in 1993, the subject being Forest policy in the Central Provinces. He was awarded a studentship at Nuffield and was also a Beit Senior Scholar, 1991–1992.

== Career ==
Mahesh Rangarajan studied at Hindu College, Delhi University (1982-1985) and at the University of Oxford (1986-1993) where he was a Rhodes Scholar. He worked as the assistant editor of The Telegraph (Kolkata) for a year during 1993–94. He taught at Cornell University, Ithaca, NY, USA from 2002 to 2004, and served as Professor, Department of History, University of Delhi, 2007-2011 and as Director, Nehru Memorial Museum and Library, New Delhi, 2011–2015. He was a Professor of Environmental Studies and History at Ashoka University. He was appointed as Vice-Chancellor of Krea University in July 2021 and stepped down from this position in less than a year citing personal reasons.

In 2000 he co-authored Towards Co-existence, and the following year a brief work, India's Wildlife History, An Introduction, Battles over Nature, a book he co-authored with Vasanth Saberwal analyses present-day conservation conflicts and finds their roots in India's colonial past and in the governance system that was adopted as an independent nation state. The book Making Conservation Work (2007) co-edited with Ghazala Shahabhuddin looks at ways of securing India's biodiversity in the new century. The same year 2007 he Co-edited a Reader Environmental Issues in India. He was a member of the founding team and corresponding editor of the Cambridge-based journal Environment and History (founded 1996) headed by Richard Grove and also of the journal Conservation and Society (founded 2003). He is a member of the executive board of the Association of South Asian Environmental Historians.

=== Political commentary ===
He is a columnist and essayist and writes frequently in the newspapers and magazines. He also appears on television as a political analyst during elections. He is known for his commentary on issues and writes analytical articles for Indian and international media.

== Awards ==
In 1988, he was awarded the Martin Wright Prize at Balliol College and the Charles Wallace Scholar and Beit Scholar at Nuffield College, Oxford University in 1991. He was a Junior fellow of the Nehru Memorial Museum & Library. He was awarded the TN Khooshoo Memorial Prize for Environment and Development in 2014.

== Books ==
- Fencing the Forest, Conservation and Ecological Change in India’s Central Provinces, 1860-1914, Oxford University Press, Delhi and Oxford, 1996; OUP Paperback, 1999.
- Ed., The Oxford Anthology of Indian Wildlife, Volume I, Hunting and Shooting, Oxford University Press, Delhi and Oxford.
- Ed., Volume II, Watching and Conserving, Oxford University Press, Delhi and Oxford.
- Co-authored with V.K. Saberwal and A. Kothari (2001), People, Parks and Wildlife: Towards Coexistence. New Delhi: Orient Longman.
- India's Wildlife History: An Introduction Permanent Black in association with the Ranthambhore Foundation, Delhi, 2001, Paperback, 2006.
- Vasant Kabir Saberwal and M Rangarajan, Ed. Battles over Nature, Science and the politics of conservation, Permanent Black, Delhi, 2003, Paperback, 2006.
- Edited, Environmental Issues in India: A Reader, Delhi: Pearson Longman, Published January 2007.
- Ghazala Shahabuddin and Mahesh Rangarajan edited, Making Conservation Work, Securing biodiversity in this new century (Delhi: Permanent Black, June 2007).
- William McNeill, Jose Padua and Mahesh Rangarajan Ed. Environmental History As if Nature Existed, (Delhi: OUP, 2010).
- ed., Bharat main paryavaran ke mudde, Hindi translation of the Reader by Rita Sridhar, (Delhi: Pearson, 2009).
- Mahesh Rangarajan and K. Sivaramakrishnan Ed., India's Environmental History Volume I, From Earliest times to the Colonial Era. Volume II: Colonialism, Modernity and the Nation, (April 2012, pp. 1200).
- Mahesh Rangarajan, N. Balakrishnan, Deepa Bhatnagar eds., Selected Works of C. Rajagopalachari, Vol. 1, 1907-1921 (Hyderabad: Blackswan Pvt Ltd., 2013).
- Mahesh Rangarajan, MD Madhusudan and Ghazala Shahabuddin edited, Nature Without Borders,( Hyderabad: Orient Black Swan, 2014)
- M Rangarajan and K. Sivaramakrishnan ed. Shifting Ground, People, animals and mobility in India's Environmental history, (Delhi: OUP, 2014).
- Mahesh Rangarajan, Nature and Nation, Essays in Environmental History, ( Ranikhet: Permanent Black, 2015).

== See also ==
- Ramachandra Guha
