= Tara Newz =

Indian Bengali-language television news channel

- Country: India
- Broadcast area: India; Bangladesh
- Headquarters: Kolkata, West Bengal, India

Programming
- Language: Bengali
- Picture format: 576i SDTV

Ownership
- Owner: Saradha Group
- Sister channels: TARA Muzik; TV Southasia

History
- Launched: 21 February 2005; 21 years ago
- Closed: 15 April 2013; 13 years ago
- Former names: TARA News

Links
- Website: www.taranews.in

Tara Newz was an Indian Bengali-language satellite and cable 24-hour news and current affairs television channel owned by the Saradha Group, a chit fund company. It was launched on 21 February 2005, airing regional news coverages, after being split from Tara Bangla, which was launched on 28 April 2000. Tara Newz was targeted to Bengali-speaking audiences in both India and Bangladesh. It is broadcast from Tara's headquarters in Salt Lake, Kolkata. Due to financial reasons, the channel was shut down in 2013.

== History ==
In 2000, Doordarshan and later Star TV's former head, Rathikant Basu, established TARA, which stood for Television Aimed at Regional Audiences. The network comprised four regional television channels in Bengali, Punjabi, Gujarati, and Marathi languages, all of which besides the Bengali one have shut down because of financial losses. On 21 February 2005, Tara exited the general entertainment genre due to stiff competition from its rivals, such as ETV Bangla and Alpha Bangla, and split Tara Bangla into two television channels, Tara Newz and Tara Muzik, devoted to news and music programming respectively. In 2010, Saradha Group acquired the two channels from Broadcast Worldwide, which owned the Tara television network.

== See also ==
- TV Southasia
