= TV Southasia =

Defunct television channel in South Asia

TV Southasia was a TV channel from Broadcast Worldwide, the makers of the popular Bengali news channel Tara Newz. It was a combined effort of the broadcasters present in the 5 countries of the South-Asian Region, viz. Bangladesh, Nepal, India, Sri Lanka and Pakistan. Broadcasts started on 19 April 2008 and consisted of programmes produced by its partner channels. Its motto was 'We are you and you are who we are'. At the time of launching, the channel lacked adequate programmes from the Maldives. Rubana Huq was the CEO of the channel from 2006 to 2010. In December 2008, the channel started producing its own talent show, South Asian Superstar, with participants from the five member countries.

The channel was shut down in 2013, at the same time as its sister channels Tara Newz and Tara Muzik.

== Partners ==
- AAJ TV – Pakistan
- Image Channel – Nepal
- Ekushey TV – Bangladesh
- MTV Channel – Sri Lanka
- Tara Newz – India

By 2012, the channel lost its Bangladeshi partner.
