= Nirmala Rao =

British political scientist and academic administrator

Nirmala Rao OBE FAcSS
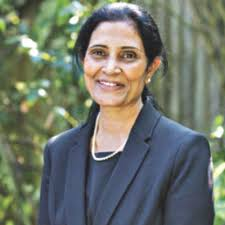
- Professor Nirmala Rao
- Born: 1959 (age 66–67); Hyderabad, India
- Occupations: Academic administrator, political scientist
- Title: Vice-Chancellor of Krea University
- Spouse: Dr Guduru Gopal Rao
- Awards: OBE (2011); FAcSS (2003)

Academic background
- Education: Delhi University; Jawaharlal Nehru University; Queen Mary University of London

Academic work
- Discipline: Political science
- Institutions: Krea University; University of Pennsylvania; Asian University for Women; SOAS, University of London; Goldsmiths, University of London; Queen Mary University of London; Policy Studies Institute; Runnymede Trust

Nirmala Rao, OBE, FAcSS (born 1959) is a British political scientist and academic administrator. She currently serves as the Vice-Chancellor of Krea University in Andhra Pradesh, India. She previously served as the Vice-Chancellor of the Asian University for Women (AUW) in Chittagong, Bangladesh (2017–2022), as Pro-Director of the School of Oriental and African Studies (SOAS), University of London (2008–2017), and as Professor of Politics and Pro-Warden for Academic Affairs at Goldsmiths, University of London (1994–2008). Her research focuses on local politics and comparative urban governance, and she has held several public advisory roles in the UK, including as an academic advisor to the Office of the Deputy Prime Minister (ODPM).

== Early life and education ==
Nirmala Rao was born in Hyderabad, India, in 1959. She completed her secondary education at Kendriya Vidyalaya, Chennai and attended Delhi University, graduating with a Bachelor of Arts (Honours) in Economics with Statistics in 1979. She subsequently gained an MA in 1981 and an MPhil in 1984 from Jawaharlal Nehru University (JNU), New Delhi.

Rao relocated to the United Kingdom in the late 1980s. She undertook doctoral studies at Queen Mary and Westfield College (University of London) between 1991 and 1993. Her PhD thesis, titled The Changing Role of the Councillor in British Local Government: An Empirical Analysis, was completed in 1993 under the supervision of Professor Ken Young. The thesis was an empirical analysis of the questions raised by the Widdicombe Committee's (1985–1986) inquiry into local authority business, for which Young had served as Director of Research.

== Academic career and leadership roles ==
Rao’s early career in the UK involved research and policy analysis. From 1987 to 1989, she served as a research fellow for the Runnymede Trust, where she authored the report Black Women in Public Housing (1990). She then held Research Fellowships at the Policy Studies Institute (1989–1991) and published several reports including The Changing Role of Local Housing Authorities (1990), Educational Change and Local Government: The Impact of the Education Reform Act (1990), and From Providing to Enabling: Local Authorities and Community Care Planning (1991).

Rao was subsequently appointed as a Senior Research Fellow at the Department of Political Studies at Queen Mary and Westfield College (1991–1994), University of London, during which time she published Managing Change: Councillors and the New Local Government (with Ken Young) and Competition, Contracts and Change: The Local Authority Experience of CCT (1995).

In 1994, Rao joined Goldsmiths, University of London as a Lecturer in Politics. She was promoted to Senior Lecturer in 1997 and Reader in 2000. In 2001, she established the Department of Politics and served as its founding Head. She was appointed Professor of Politics in 2002 and served as Pro-Warden (Academic Affairs) from 2006 to 2008.

In 2008, Rao was appointed Pro-Director (Learning and Teaching) at the School of Oriental and African Studies (SOAS). She also served as Acting Director of the School during two periods, from 2011 to 2012 and from 2014 to 2016. During her tenure, the institution underwent institutional trnasformation and was granted its own degree-awarding powers.

In February 2017, Rao became the Vice-Chancellor of the Asian University for Women (AUW) in Chittagong, Bangladesh, working on university governance, academic partnerships, and campus development. During her tenure, student recruitment expanded to countries including Myanmar, Timor-Leste, Laos, Cambodia, Bhutan, Sri Lanka, Syria and Palestine. The university also entered the initial phase of accreditation with the New England Commission of Higher Education (NECHE) and established academic partnerships with institutions including the University of Sussex and the University of Cambridge.

In July 2022, Rao assumed the office of Vice-Chancellor at the newly established Krea University in Sri City, Andhra Pradesh. In 2023, she was appointed Visiting Faculty at the School of Education, University of Pennsylvania.

== Public service ==
Rao has held various appointments on public bodies and regulatory boards in the United Kingdom and India:

- Architects Registration Board (ARB): Appointed Member (2003–2009).
- General Council of the Bar: Lay Member (1998–2004).
- Ealing Hospital NHS Trust: Non-Executive Director (2003–2005).
- Office of the Deputy Prime Minister (ODPM): Academic Advisor to the Minister for Housing and Local Government (1997–1998).
- Audit Commission: Academic Advisor.
- Government of Andhra Pradesh: Advisor.
- Trinity Laban Conservatoire of Music and Dance: Governor (2013–2024).
- United World Schools: Trustee (2019–2023).

== Scholarship ==
Her research focuses on urban governance, local democracy, and public administration. Her 1997 book, Local Government Since 1945, co-authored with Ken Young, examines post-war developments in British local government, with particular emphasis on the relationship between central and local authorities. In Governing London (2002), co-authored with Ben Pimlott, she examines the period between the abolition of the Greater London Council in 1986 and the establishment of the Greater London Authority in 2000, analysing the institutional reforms that reshaped London's municipal governance. Her later publications, including Cities in Transition (2007) and Reshaping City Governance (2015), adopt a comparative perspective on urban governance, examining governance structures and policy developments in metropolitan areas including London, Tokyo, Toronto, Atlanta, Hyderabad, Mumbai, and Kolkata.

== Honours and awards ==
- 2003: Fellow of the Academy of the Social Sciences (FAcSS).
- 2011: Officer of the Order of the British Empire (OBE) for services to scholarship.
- 2018: Honorary Fellow of Lucy Cavendish College, University of Cambridge.

== Personal life ==
Rao is married to Dr. Guduru Gopal Rao, a consultant microbiologist, who was appointed an Officer of the Order of the British Empire (OBE) in 2009 for services to medicine.

== Selected publications ==
- Reshaping City Governance: London, Mumbai, Kolkata, Hyderabad. Routledge. 2015. ISBN 978-0-415-67209-2.
- Cities in Transition: Growth, Change and Governance in Six Metropolitan Areas. Routledge. 2007. ISBN 978-0-415-32901-9.
- Transforming Local Political Leadership (Ed. with Rikke Berg). Palgrave Macmillan. 2005. ISBN 1403992835.
- Governing London (with Ben Pimlott). Oxford University Press. 2002. ISBN 019-924492-8.
- Reviving Local Democracy: New Labour, New Politics? Policy Press. 2000. ISBN 1-86134-218-7.
- Representation and Community in Western Democracies (Ed.). Macmillan. 2000. ISBN 0-333-77695-X.
- Local Government Since 1945 (with Ken Young). Blackwell. 1997.
- The Making and Unmaking of Local Self-Government. Dartmouth. 1994.
- Coming to Terms with Change: The Local Government Councillor in 1993 (with Ken Young). Joseph Rowntree Foundation. 1994.
- Black Women in Public Housing. Runnymede Trust. 1990.
