= Krea University =

Private university in Andhra Pradesh, India

Coordinates: 13°32′53.7″N 80°00′00.8″E

- క్రియా విశ్వవిద్యాలయ
- Type: Private liberal arts college and research university
- Established: 1970; 56 years ago (as IFMR); 2018; 8 years ago (as Krea University)
- Chancellor: Lakshmi Narayanan
- Vice-Chancellor: Nirmala Rao (OBE, FAcSS)
- Students: 1570
- Location: 5655, Central Expressway, Sri City, Andhra Pradesh, India
- Campus: 40 acres (16 ha); Rural
- Language: English
- Colors: Shades of blue
- Website: https://krea.edu.in

Krea University is an Indian private university located in Sri City, Andhra Pradesh focused on liberal arts, sciences and management. It was established in 2018 by a team of high-net-worth individuals and academicians including Raghuram Rajan, Sajjan Jindal, Anand Mahindra. The Institute for Financial Management and Research was incorporated under the aegis of university, which along with the School of Interwoven Arts and Sciences (SIAS) are the two schools housed in the campus.

== History ==
The university was established in 2018 under the Andhra Pradesh Private Universities (Establishment and Regulation) Amendment Act, 2018. It was temporarily housed in the IFMR campus, before shifting to its current campus in Sri City.

=== Roots in IFMR (1970s-2018) ===
The university was initially housed under the Sri City campus of Institute for Financial Management and Research, which was established in 1974 as a not-for-profit society focused financial and management research.

In 2021, Mahesh Rangarajan, from Ashoka University, took over as the vice-chancellor of the university. He then resigned from the position in less than a year citing personal circumstances. Professor Nirmala Rao, OBE, FAcSS is the current Vice-Chancellor of Krea University and took over the role in 2022..

== Campus ==
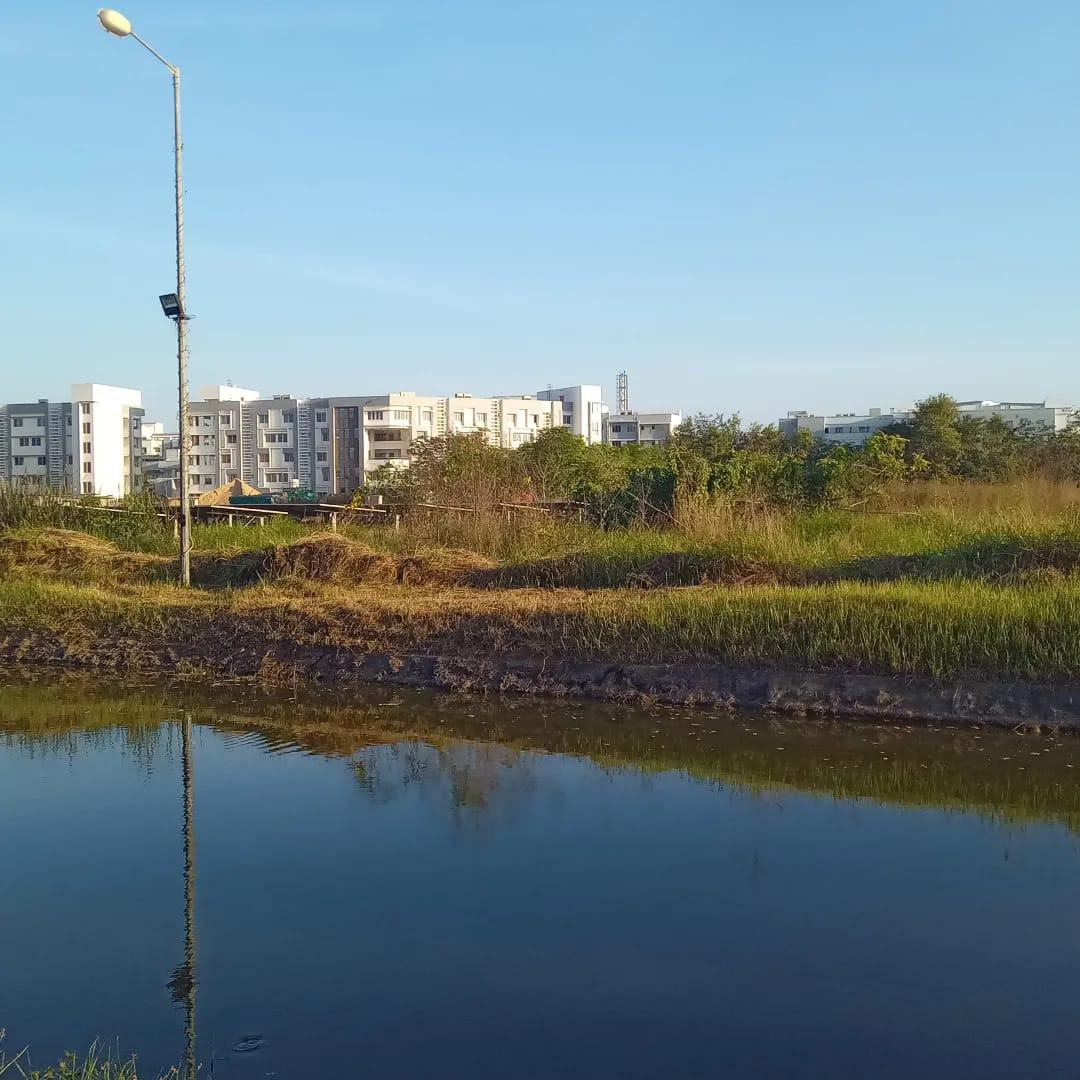
Krea University's Residence Halls view from the Perimeter Walk

Located 70 km north of Chennai, the Sri City campus was planned as a 'Circular Campus'. This forty-acre campus consists of two academic buildings where classes and research takes place: The JSW Academic Building, and the New Academic Block, which is connected to the university's main library.

The JSW Academic Building, is the main hub of learning in the campus. Established in 2023, it has a built up area of 110,000 sq ft. that houses various classrooms, laboratories and centers of administration and research. It contains Seminar Hall 1, Kothari Hall and Seminar Hall 3, and various workspaces.

HT Parekh Library, the university's main library, is a 10,000 sq ft library with over 30 thousand books. There are more than 50 Indian and international journals in print and over 60000+ e-journals under the library's catalog. The library is recognized as a World Bank Open Knowledge Repository.

The New Academic Block, inaugurated in 2022 consists of laboratories for physics, biological sciences and chemistry research. It also houses the faculty rooms and more workspaces.

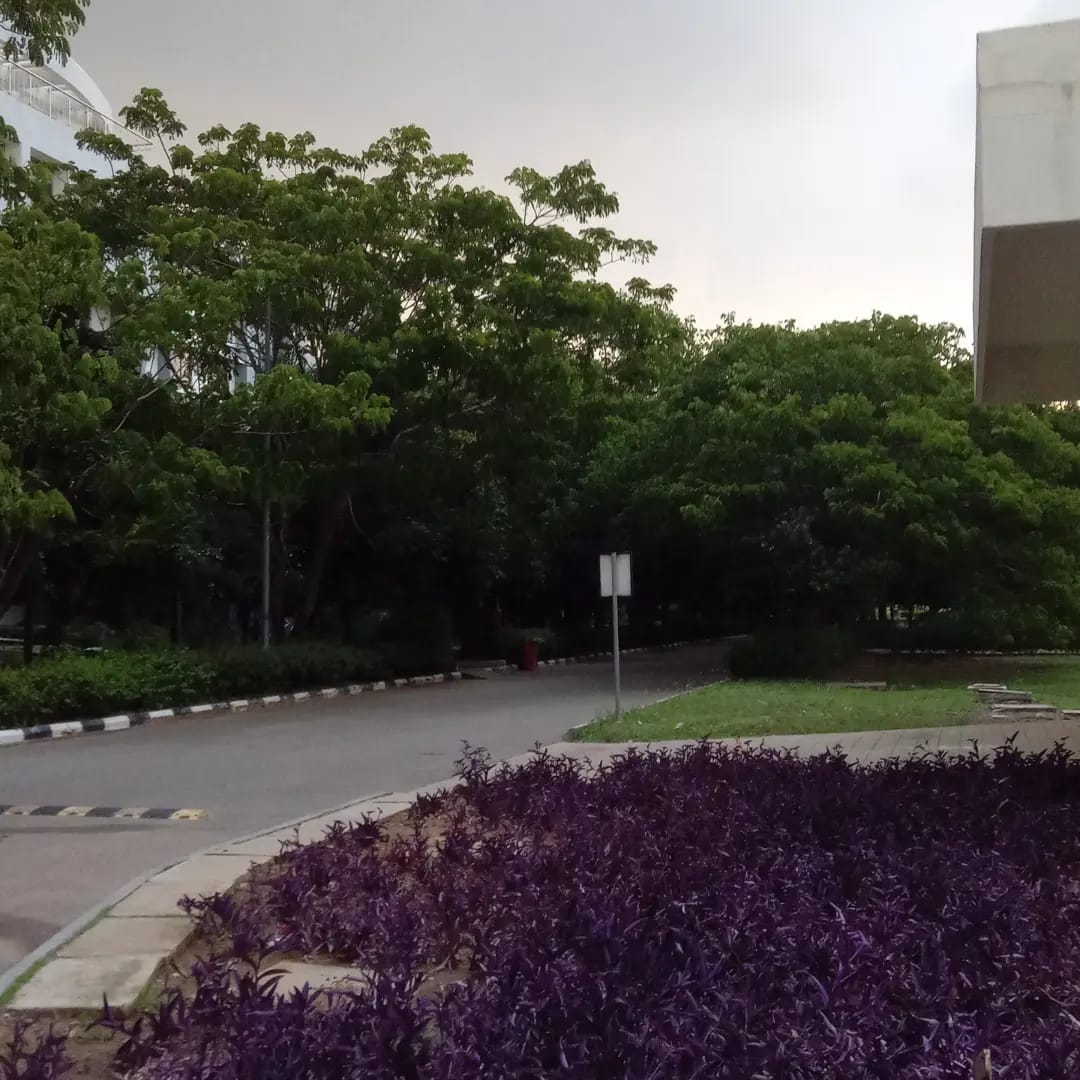
University during monsoon season, covering parts of Residence Halls 1 and 3

Students are housed under 9 residence halls across the campus, some of which are divided by gender and some are mixed-gendered. Campus encloses a dining hall and also includes various cafeterias and restaurants that are spread around campus.

At the centre of the campus is the Open-air Amphitheatre (OAT), where cultural and social events are hosted.

Facilities include fields and courts for sports such as badminton, basketball, cricket, and football.

== Organization and Administration ==
=== Leadership ===
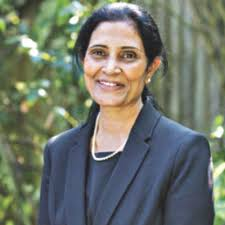
Nirmala Rao, the current Vice-chancellor of Krea University

Professor Nirmala Rao, OBE, FAcSS is the current Vice-Chancellor of Krea University. She was preceded by Dr. Mahesh Rangarajan (July 2021 to February 2022) and Sunder Ramaswamy (2017–2021). The current Chancellor of university is Lakshmi Narayanan, former CEO and vice-chairman of Cognizant. He was preceded by N Vaghul, who resigned from his tenure in 2023.

The Governing Council includes various high-net-worth individuals around the world like, Anand Mahindra, Kiran Mazumdar-Shaw, Kalpana Morparia, Dr Raghuram Rajan, Srinivasa Raju and academicians of all fields of study including Vishakha Desai, Dr Tara Thiagarajan and Nobel Prize laureate Esther Duflo.

== Academics ==
=== Undergraduate education ===
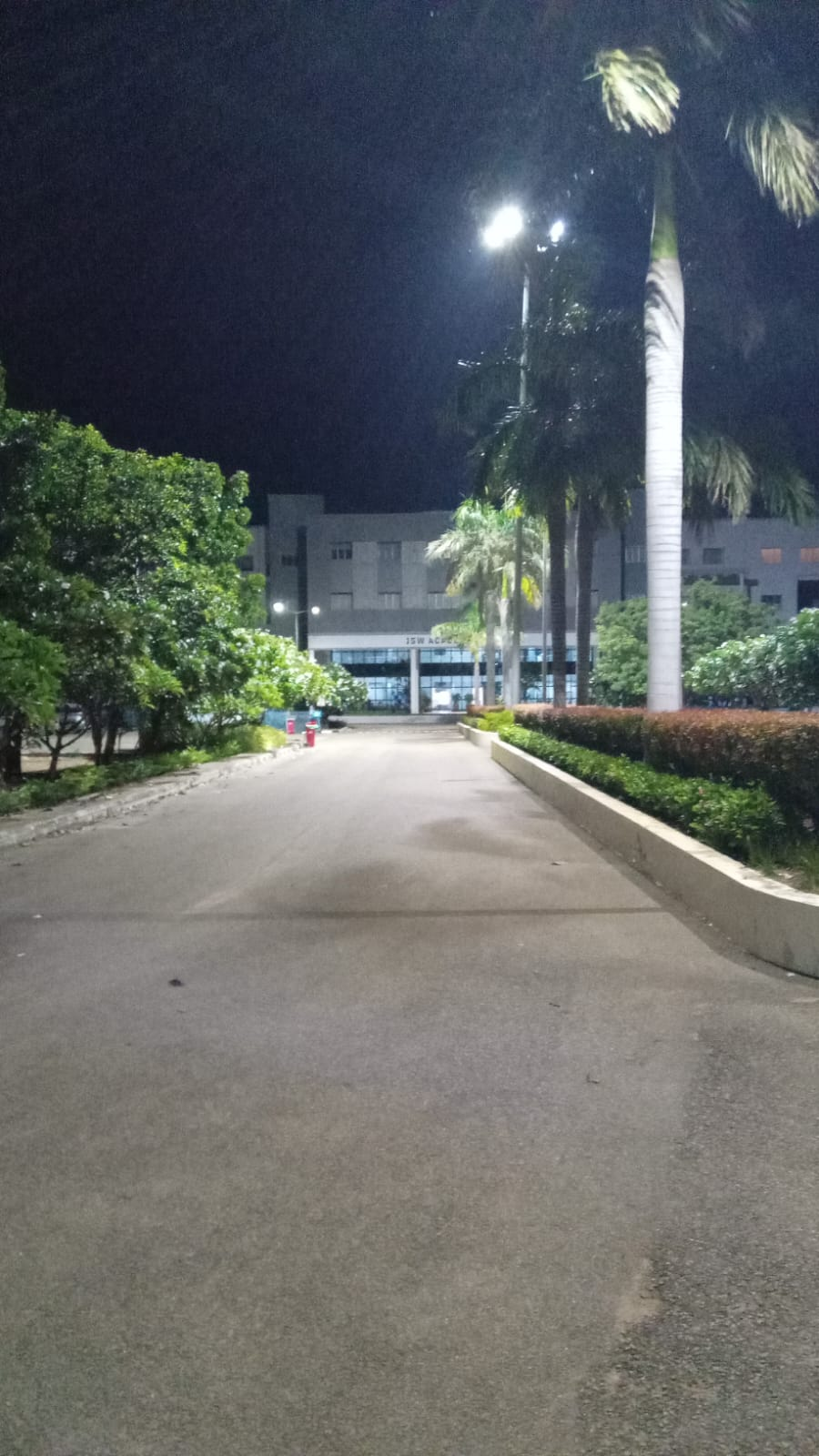
JSW Academic Building, the place that houses the undergraduate programs.

Krea University's School of Interwoven Arts and Sciences offers four-year residential undergraduate programs in the liberal arts and sciences leading to BA (Hons.) and BSc(Hons.) degrees, with an option to pursue a three-year BA and BSc course. The bachelor's program follows a trimester system, where each term is for 12 weeks. Apart from the first year general requirements, the program follows an open curriculum and currently offers over 500 course combinations across more than 20 disciplines. It enables students to choose any combination of major, minor and concentration. Student don't declare their majors until the middle of their sophomore year.

==== First Year Courses ====
At SIAS, students irrespective of their intended major are required to satisfy the general requirements of 12 core and skills courses that includes scientific reasoning, mathematical reasoning, social science, history, philosophy, data sciences and computation. They are of 3-credits each and are usually taken by students by their 4th trimester.

==== IFMR Integrated-MBA Program ====
Since 2023, the IFMR Graduate School of Business offers a five-year Integrated MBA program, where students have exit options at their junior and senior year to get a BBA or BBA(Hons.) degree. Cohort of 2025 consisted of 72 students from 15 states, 2 Union Territories and 34 cities.

=== Graduate and Doctorate education ===
The School of Interwoven Arts and Sciences, offers a MSc in Clinical Psychology and a PhD in a range of disciplines including Chemistry, Computer Science, Environmental Studies, History, Mathematics, Physics, Politics, Psychology and Sociology & Social Anthropology.

IFMR GSB offers graduate education in the form of master's and doctorate programs. IFMR GSB also provides an Executive MBA programs with specialization in finance, supply chain, human relations and industry relations for executives of L&T Construction. IFMR GSB offers PhD programs from Madras University, including Organizational Behavior & Human Resource Management, Strategic Management, Finance, Information Systems & Data Science, Economics, Marketing, Operations and Management.

=== Admissions and Tuition ===
In the School of Interwoven Arts and Sciences, the class of 2024 consisted of 260 students coming from 21 states in India and 5 countries around the world. Admissions are made based on an online application and aptitude test. Shortlisted students then go through personal interviews and Krea Immersive Case Analysis. The School follows a need-blind policy for admissions and meets the demonstrated need of all students. The tuition for students at SIAS in 2026 is ₹875,000 per year. Room & board and other fees are ₹225,000 per year.

The flagship program at IFMR Graduate School of Business, MBA consisted of 264 for the cohort of 2025. The tuition for students of the MBA program is ₹1,500,000. The program provides various need-based and merit-based scholarships for students along with named and endowed scholarships.

=== Reputation and Partnerships ===
The IFMR Graduate School of Business has ranked in the top 100 of NIRF Management rankings since its inception. Krea University received recognition as one of the institutions leading the wave of liberal arts education in India from Forbes.

Krea University has partnered with universities and academic institutions around the world. The partner universities include Northeastern University, University of Chicago, Case Western Reserve University, University of Bristol, Sussex University, Sciences Po and Macquarie University. Krea has partnered with the Dalai Lama Centre For Ethics and Transformative Values to introduce ethics as part of its undergraduate program's curriculum.

Corporate partnerships include WayCool Foods, which has partnered with IFMR GSB at Krea University to form the LEAP program and Kauvery Hospital to operate and maintain a health centre and pharmacy at the campus in Sri City.

== Research Centres ==
Krea University is home to various research centres in vast fields of study. Some of them are:

- LEAD: A non-profit research organization conducting high-quality scalable action research and outreach in development economics and finance. Programmes enabled include Initiative for What Works to Advance Women and Girls in the Economy (IWWAGE), Inclusive Cashless Payment Partnership (CATALYST) and Evidence for Policy Design (EPoD) India.
- Abdul Latif Jameel Poverty Action Lab (J-PAL): A global research centre working to reduce poverty by ensuring that policy is informed by scientific evidence. In South Asia, it has partnerships in Bangladesh, India, Nepal, Pakistan, and Sri Lanka. Much of Nobel Laureates Abhijit Banerjee and Esther Duflo's work on randomized control trials for shaping policy in India was done at J-PAL South Asia.
- Moturi Satyanarayana Centre for Advanced Study in the Humanities and Social Sciences: A Centre of excellence for advanced research in humanities and social sciences. The centre was inaugurated by vice president of India Venkaiah Naidu. It commemorates veteran freedom fighter, Member of the Constituent Assembly, the Provisional Parliament two-time Rajya Sabha member Moturi Satyanarayana.
- Sapien Lab Centre for Human Brain and Mind: The centre was inaugurated by K. Vijay Raghavan, former principal scientific adviser to the Government of India. It seeks to track and understand the impact of the changing environment on the human brain, and its consequences for the individual and society. The studies will be used to mitigate risks and enhance outcomes.
- Water, Environment, Land and Livelihoods Labs (WELL Labs): WELL Labs was started in April 2023 as an autonomous centre based in IFMR. Dr Veena Srinivasan, a water expert with 20 years of experience, is the founder. In collaboration with Krea University and other centres at IFMR, the lab will address challenges pertaining to land and water. Their priorities include translating research outputs to measurable societal impact.
- Centre for Writing and Pedagogy: Krea University is home to the Centre for Writing and Pedagogy. They have conducted various workshops over the years across India. During the COVID-19 pandemic, the Centre conducted various workshops on online writing and writing pedagogies during the pandemic, in academic institutions across the world.
- Centre for Digital Financial Inclusion (CDFI): A social enterprise developing and supporting digital innovations for social impact.
- Inclusion Economics India Centre: In 2022, IFMR and Inclusion Economics at Yale University signed a memorandum of understanding to conduct policy-engaged research that promotes inclusive economies and societies. The collaboration will focus on data collection, research, close engagement with policymakers, and communication of data-driven insights to inform and encourage evidence-based dialogues on economic and social inclusion. Krea University will provide strategic oversight.
- Deccan Centre for International Relations: A think tank dedicated to advancing policy, research and dialogue on Geopolitics, Business and Technology, with primary focus on South India's role in international engagement was launched in January 2026.

== Student Life ==
As a residential college in a rural setting, the student life at Krea University is confined to the campus premises. The college has 9 residence halls, and houses many facilities for the students' social life. Krea students run various newsletters, magazines and journals. Leher is a student-run independent newspaper in Krea.

=== Student Clubs ===
There are over 30 active student clubs at Krea University, with financial oversight of each club delegated by the Office of Student Life (OSL). Clubs are student-run and have their own charter and constitution governing them. There are a variety of clubs on campus, including various discipline-specific clubs, clubs that focus on social service, political advocacy and awareness, competitive athletics, professional development and networking, performing arts, academic debate. The most famous amongst them is Rangasthala, the theatre club of Krea. They host a student-led play every term. Students of the theatre club have won various competition across India. The university hosts their annual Club Rush early in the semester for all students interested in joining clubs or other student organizations.

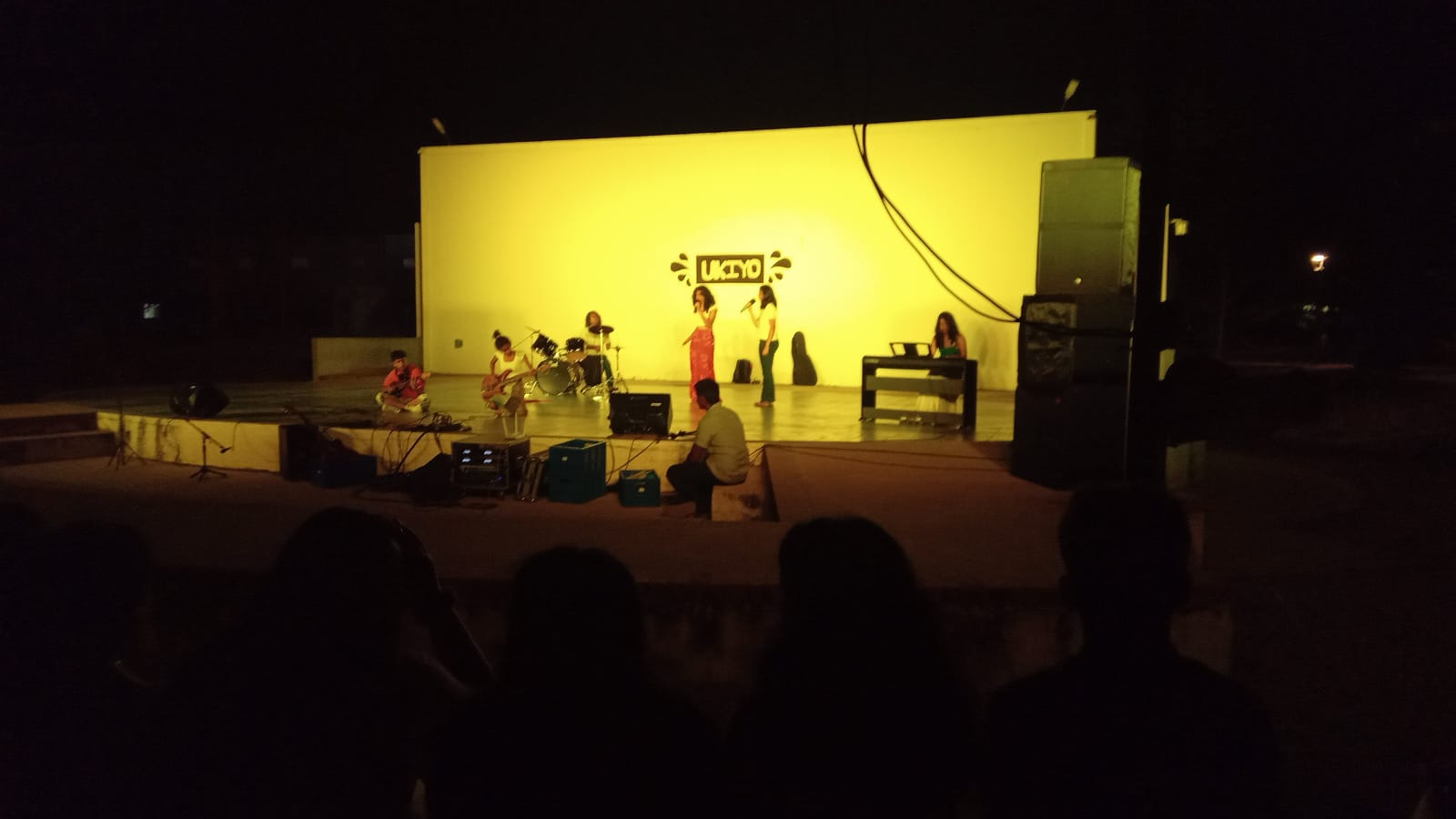
Ukiyo, 2023 student fest of IFMR iMBA at the amphitheater

=== Student Events ===
Events are a frequent occurrence across the campus, with religious festivals and college fests playing a significant role in the students' social life. In 2023, students at Krea University organised and hosted its first TEDx event on campus which included various eminent speakers and discussions.

== Notable Faculty and Alumni ==
Notable faculty at Krea University include:

- Prof S Sivakumar, Dean of Research and Professor of Physics.
- Professor Lakshmi Kumar, Dean, IFMR Graduate School of Business.
- Dr Prithvi Data Chandra Shobhi, Associate Dean and associate professor of history.
- Dr Kalyan Chakrabarti, Associate Dean (Students) and associate professor of Biological Sciences and Chemistry.
- Dr Panchali Ray, Associate Dean (Academic) and associate professor of Anthropology and Gender Studies.
- Ramachandra Guha, eminent historian and writer.
- Dr Vinod Kumar Saranathan, PhD Yale, BA Ohio Wesleyan University; Professor of Biological Sciences.
- Dr. Anannya Dasgupta, Director, Centre for Writing and Pedagogy.
- Sayantan Datta, award-winning queer and science journalist; Assistant Professor for Practice, Centre for Writing and Pedagogy.
- V Anantha Nageswaran, Incumbent Chief Economic Advisor to the Government of India; former Dean, IFMR GSB.
- Annu Jalais, PhD London School of Economics Professor of Anthropology.

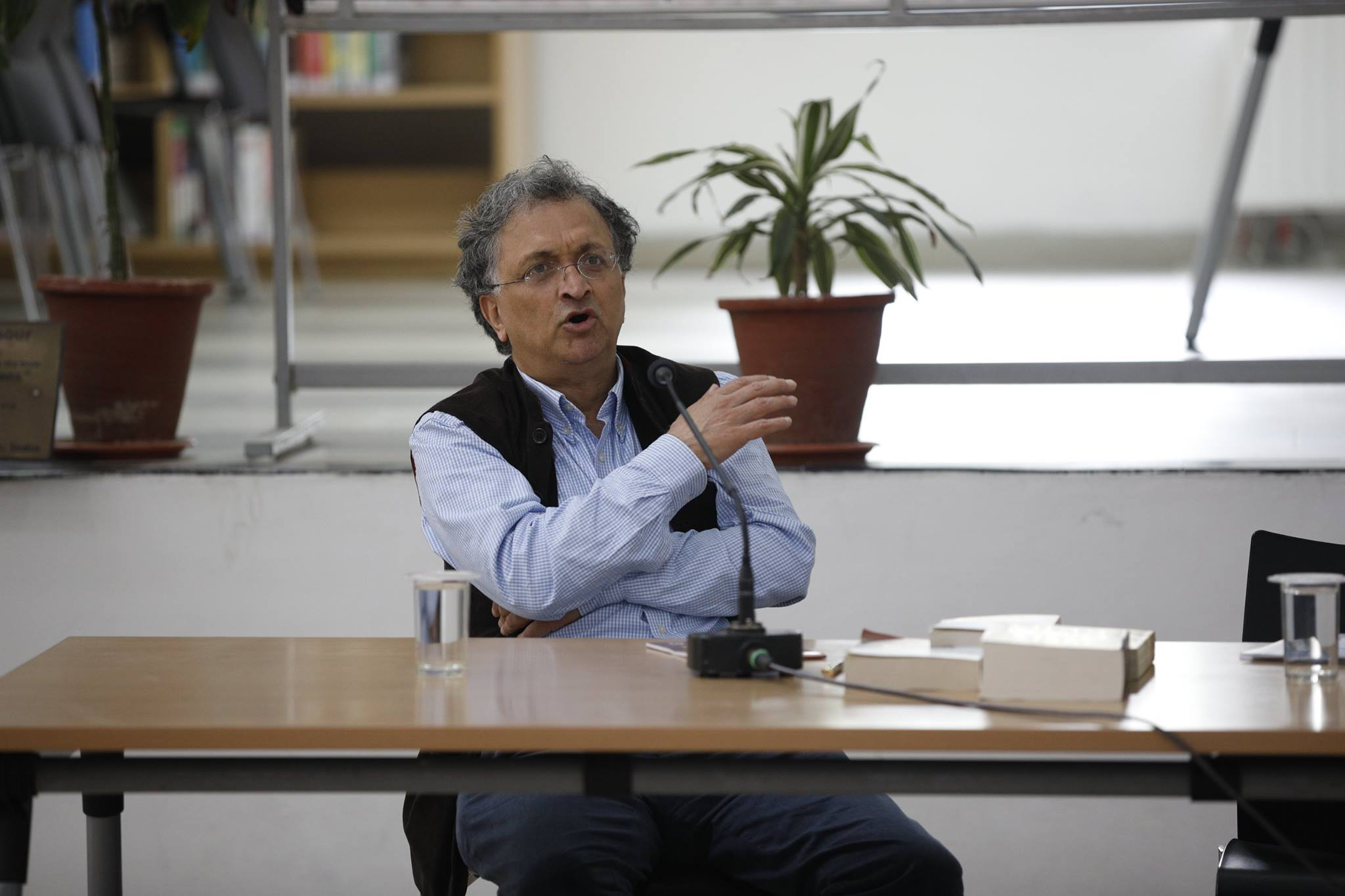
Ram Guha, a key authority in the history of Modern India, is a Distinguished University Professor at Krea
