= Asian University for Women =

University in Bangladesh

- Other name: AUW
- Type: Independent, international, liberal arts and sciences
- Established: 2008; 18 years ago
- Parent institution: The Asian University for Women Support Foundation (AUWSF), Cambridge, MA, USA
- Affiliations: University Grants Commission (UGC)
- Chairperson: Maithree Wickramasinghe
- Chancellor: Cherie Blair
- Vice-Chancellor: Rubana Huq
- Academic staff: 158
- Administrative staff: 197
- Students: 1724 (2025)
- Location: M M Ali Road, Chittagong, Bangladesh; 22.3580°N 91.8240°E
- Campus: 140; Urban
- Website: asian-university.org

University rankings

Regional – Overall
- QS Asia: 801-850 (2026)

Asian University for Women (AUW) is an independent, international university in Chittagong, Bangladesh. AUW admits students solely on the basis of merit, regardless of their family's income level. In 2026, over 90% of AUW students were on scholarship support with many being the first in their family to attend a university. AUW offers two pre-collegiate bridge programs called Access Academy and Pathways for Promise, as well as a three-year undergraduate program based on the liberal arts and sciences. As of 2026, AUW has over 2000 students enrolled from over 35 ethnicities across Asia and the Middle East.

== History ==
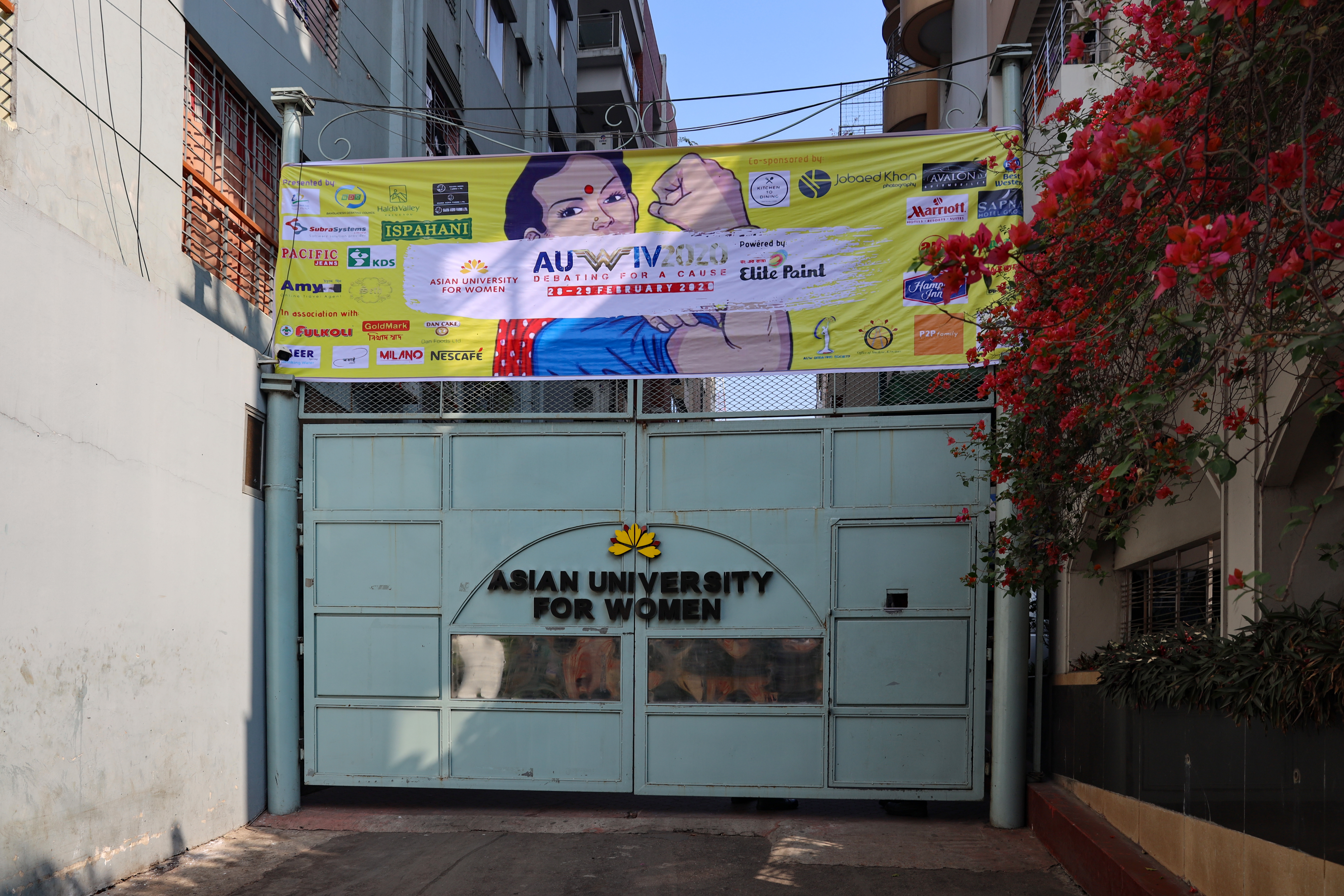
Entrance

The story of AUW began well before its inaugural class entered in 2008. The idea for the university grew out of the World Bank/UN Task Force on Higher Education and Society. In 2000, the Task Force, which included Kamal Ahmad, Harvard University's Dean Henry Rosovsky and the World Bank's former managing director Mamphela Ramphele, published its findings in a report titled "Higher Education in Developing Countries: Peril and Promise", which concluded that developing countries must improve the quality of their institutions of higher learning, in governance and pedagogy, to compete in today's increasingly globalised, knowledge-based economy.

=== 2001–2004 ===
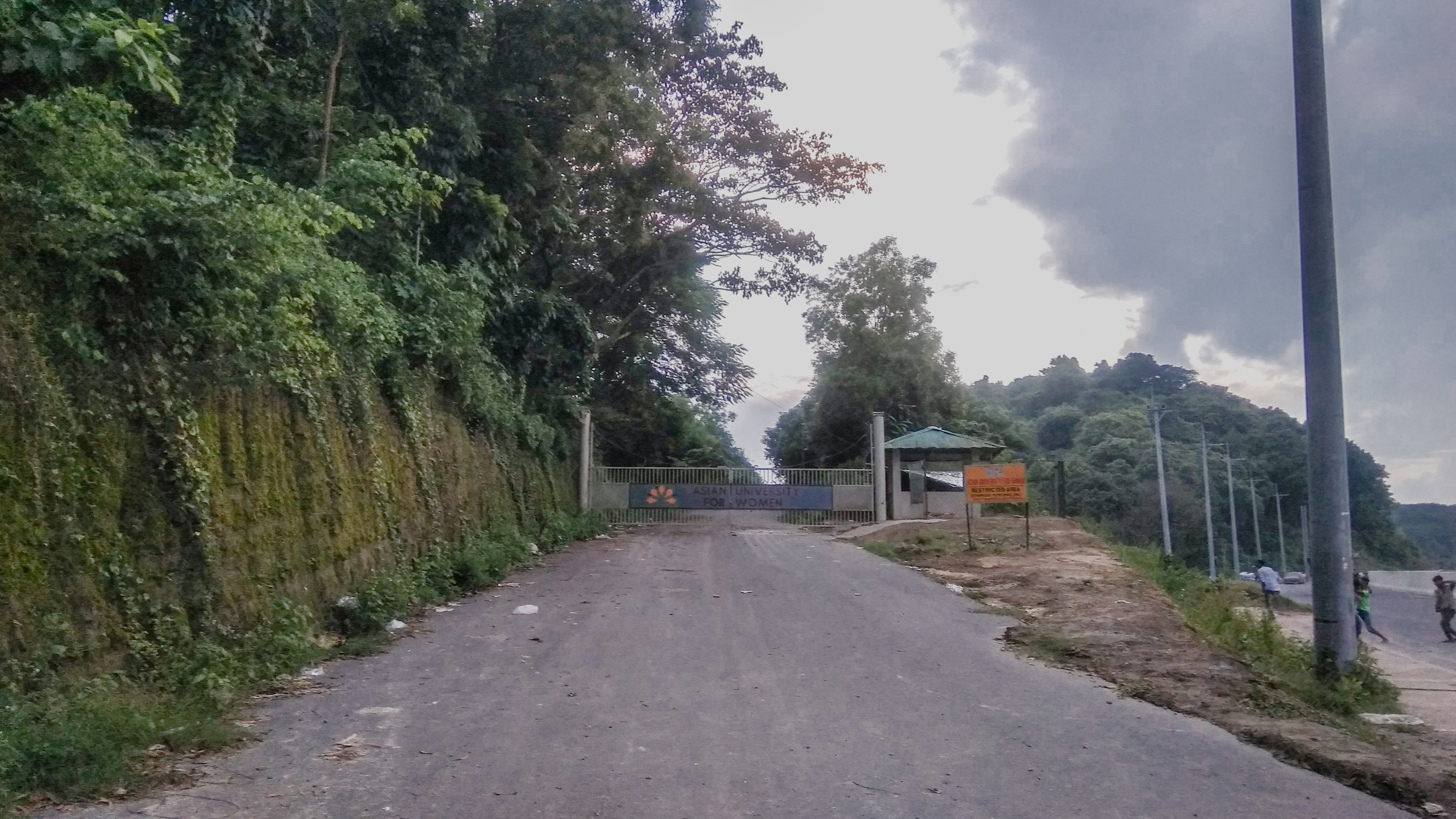
Entrance of the AUW campus in Chittagong Hill Tracts

In January 2004, the government of Bangladesh, whose foreign minister Dipu Moni was a trustee of the university, granted a large plot of land for the construction of AUW's permanent campus in the near Chittagong.

Fundraising and planning efforts for AUW officially began in November 2001, when AUW Support Foundation was incorporated as a non-profit institution under section 501(c)3 of the United States Internal Revenue Code. AUW's Support Foundation is governed by a board of directors, which was established upon the group's incorporation as a non-profit organisation.

AUWSF board of directors published a Plan of Operations in May 2005, laying out the basic plans for AUW's curriculum, target student population, and sustainability efforts.

=== 2005–2007 ===
Grants from the Goldman Sachs Foundation and the Bill & Melinda Gates Foundation in 2005 and 2006 provided the start-up funds that enabled AUW to become operational in 2008. Additional funding was provided by the Rockefeller Foundation, the U.S. State Department, and the IKEA Foundation, which promised sponsorship for 100 students for five years. In September 2006, the Parliament of Bangladesh ratified the university's charter, which guaranteed full autonomy and independence to AUW in its operations and academics - a unique arrangement in the region.

AUW began operations in Chittagong in March 2008. Its first cohort of students consisted of over 100 young women from six countries: Bangladesh, Cambodia, India, Nepal, Pakistan, and Sri Lanka. This inaugural class attended Access Academy, AUW's year-long bridge program designed to prepare underserved students for the rigors of university education. After completing the Access Academy program, 128 of them continued into the first year of their undergraduate studies and were joined by direct-entry students who began the undergraduate program in 2009.

=== 2008–2010 ===
In 2009, AUW's initial Board of Trustees was elected by the International Support Committee of Asian University for Women in accordance with the provisions of the charter of Asian University for Women.

The university appointed its first chancellor in January 2011: Cherie Blair, international human rights lawyer and wife of former British Prime Minister Tony Blair.

=== 2011–2012 ===
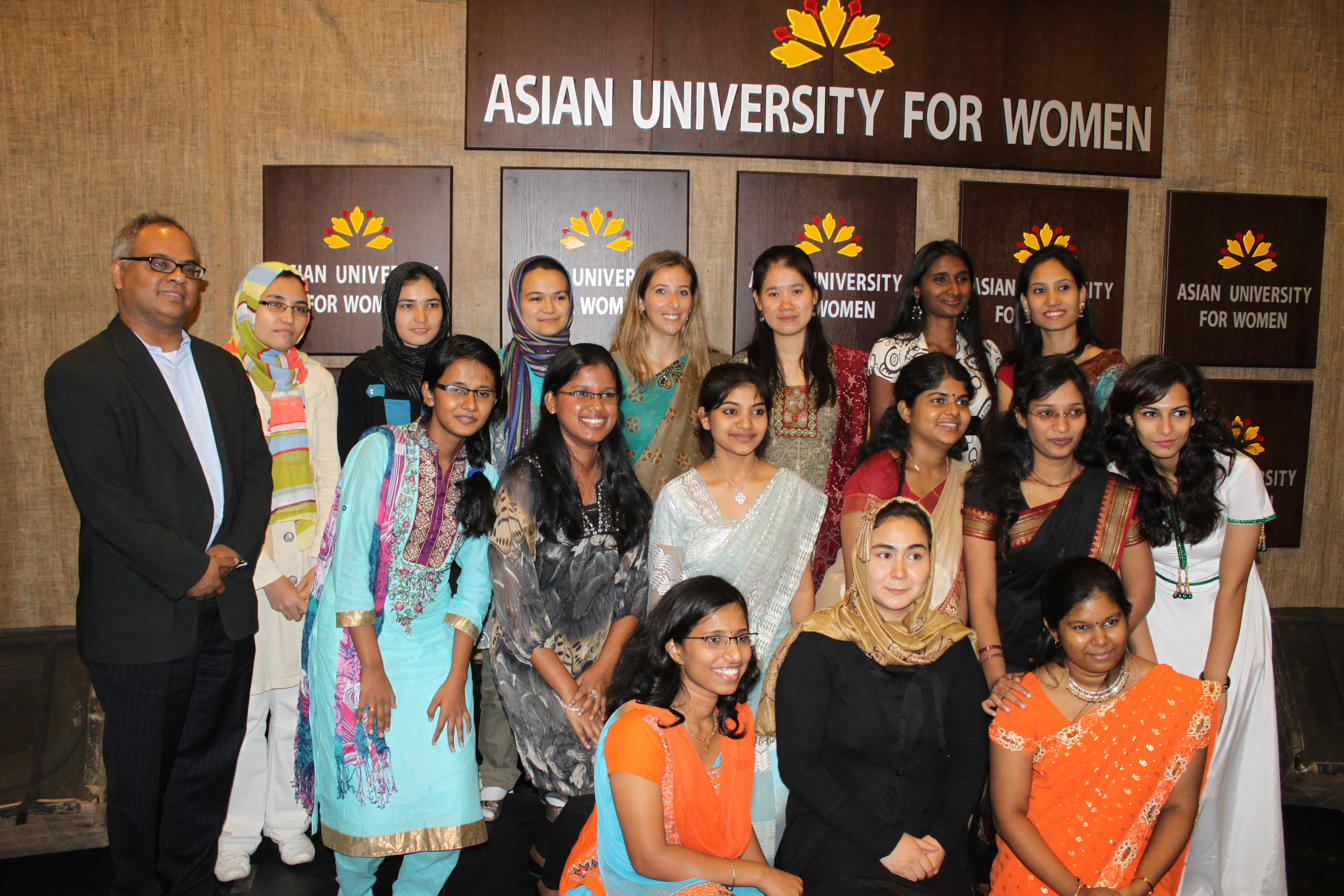
AUW students in 2012

In April 2011, AUW held a foundation stone laying ceremony at the site of its permanent campus in Pahartoli, with the Honorable Prime Minister Sheikh Hasina as the Chief Guest. The Government of Bangladesh granted over 140 acres for the university's campus, which has been designed by Israeli-American architect Moshe Safdie and Associates.

The summer of 2012 marked the university's first summer term, which offered 20 courses on campus taught by AUW professors and visiting faculty. During that summer, the university hosted two leadership training seminars co-sponsored by the United States Department of State: the Women in Public Service Institute (which was co-sponsored by the Seven Sisters Women's Colleges) took place in August; the Grassroots Women's Political Leadership Forum was held in September.

=== 2013–2016 ===
In May 2013, the university graduated its first class of 132 students. The 2012–13 academic year saw AUW's first full complement of classes - a total student body of 535, with cohorts in Access Academy and all four undergraduate years. They represent 15 countries: Afghanistan, Bangladesh, Bhutan, Cambodia, China, India, Indonesia, Malaysia, Nepal, Pakistan, Palestine, Sri Lanka, Syria, and Vietnam.

In January 2016, AUW launched Pathways for Promise to provide university education to female garment-factory workers and other women from vulnerable groups. Nearly 800 women responded and sat for the first round of admissions tests. Over 50 women qualified. In January 2016 they entered AUW's Pathways to Promise program - the pilot phase of which was supported by IKEA Foundation and George Soros's Open Society Foundations. When the 2016 autumn semester began, new Pathways students came to campus and the program grew by 50%.

As of May 2016, AUW had graduated over 440 alumnae, all of whom plan to go on to graduate studies or begin careers in the public sector, research, non-governmental organizations, and private enterprise.

=== 2017 ===
Professor Nirmala Rao joins AUW as vice-chancellor. Rao is a distinguished political scientist who most recently served for eight years as Pro Director of at the School of Oriental and African Studies (SOAS) at the University of London.

In May 2017, AUW graduated its fifth class of students, bringing the total alumnae count to more than 525.

=== 2019 ===
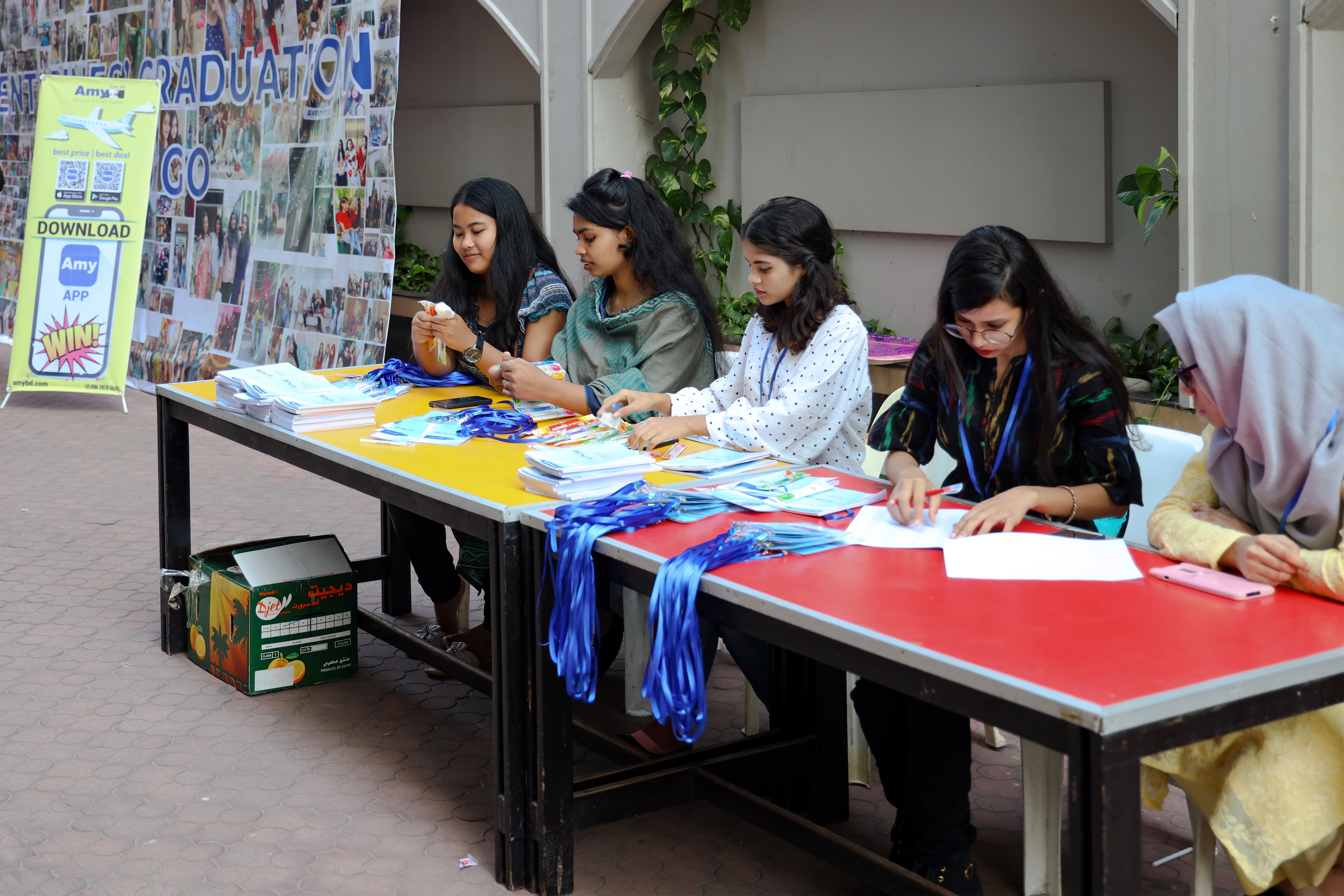
During AUW Inter-Versity Debate Championship 2020

As of 2019, AUW has graduated more than 800 students. The current student body is represented by almost 900 students from 19 countries: Afghanistan, Bangladesh, Bhutan, Cambodia, China, India, Indonesia, Lao PDR, Malaysia, Myanmar, Nepal, Pakistan, Palestine, Senegal, Sri Lanka, Syria, Timore Leste, Vietnam, and Yemen.

In 2019 AUW created a Community Learning Center where AUW students could volunteer to teach basic lessons to local children in Maths, Science and English.

=== 2021 ===
In 2021, AUW began recruiting students from Afghanistan. Between 2021 and 2024, five hundred Afghan women enrolled with AUW.

=== 2022 ===
Rubana Huq became the vice-chancellor of AUW.

=== 2024 ===
In 2024, the university had 1,345 students from seventeen countries. In 2024, work started on the new campus building which had been designed by Moshe Safdie.

=== 2025 ===
In 2025, AUW honoured Cherie Blair as a Doctor of Justice.

== Funding ==
AUW Support Foundation, a 501(c)(3)-registered nonprofit organization based in Cambridge, Massachusetts, is the primary source of funding mobilization for the university.

It is governed by its own board of directors (several of whom serve on the AUW Board of Trustees). Separately, a number of independent "support groups" have been created in different tax jurisdictions around the world to help mobilize financial resources for the university - such support groups currently exist in UK, Denmark, Hong Kong, and Japan.

In 2024, 85% of students at AUW benefited from scholarships funded by governments, foundations, corporate sponsors and individual donors.

== Academic programmes ==
=== Pre-undergraduate ===
AUW recruits underserved women, many of whom have not had adequate secondary school training due to their backgrounds. Therefore, AUW specially designed Access Academy, a one-year program which offers preparation in computer literacy, reading and writing in English, scientific thought, global history, and other subjects.

Given the lower standards of secondary school preparation in many of the communities from which AUW students come, the university has found that one year of Access Academy is not sufficient to prepare students from certain communities for AUW's rigorous undergraduate curriculum. AUW, therefore, offers Pathways for Promise to students who require a longer period of intensive preparation in English language, math, and computer literacy before enrolling in Access Academy.

=== Undergraduate ===
AUW students choose from the following majors: Applied Mathematics & Data Science (B.Sc.); Biological Sciences (B.Sc.); Economics (B.A.); Computer Sciences (B.Sc.); Environmental Sciences (B.Sc.); Humanities (B.Sc.); Chemical and Environmental Engineering (Integrated BSc + MSc); Philosophy, Politics & Economics (B.A.); and Public Health Studies (B.Sc.).

=== Graduate ===
AUW offers master's degrees in education (M.A.) and Apparel & Retail Management (MS)

=== Internships and careers ===
AUW offers opportunities for students to participate in applied research projects, study programs, and internships to prepare them for professional life after AUW.

== Accidents and injuries on campus ==
The death of one of AUW international students, Ms Zahra Hussaini, reported on 27 May 2022. Zahra had arrived from Afghanistan in February to join the pre-university program.

== See also ==
- List of universities in Bangladesh
