= Annisul Huq =

Bangladeshi businessman

- আনিসুল হক
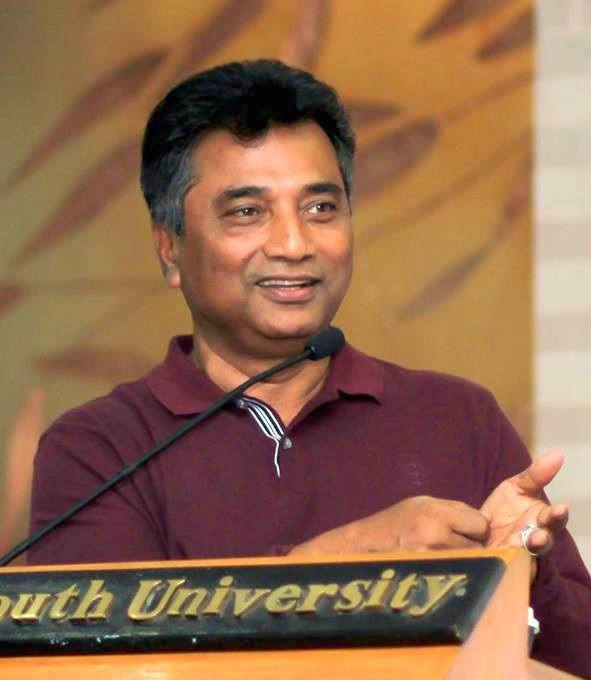
- Annisul Huq in 2016

1st Mayor of North Dhaka
- In office 7 May 2015 – 30 November 2017
- Preceded by: Post established
- Succeeded by: Osman Goni; as Acting Mayor

Personal details
- Born: 27 September 1952 Sonapur, Sonagazi, Feni, East Bengal, Dominion of Pakistan
- Died: 30 November 2017 (aged 65) London, England
- Resting place: Banani Graveyard, Dhaka
- Spouse: Rubana Huq
- Relations: Shafiul Huq (brother)
- Children: 3
- Education: B.S.S and M.S.S
- Alma mater: University of Chittagong; University of Rajshahi
- Occupation: Chairman and CEO, Mohammadi Group
- Awards: National ICT Award, (2017)
- Website: annisulhuq.com

Annisul Huq (27 September 1952 – 30 November 2017) was a Bangladeshi entrepreneur, television show host, and politician who served as the mayor of North Dhaka from 2015 until his death in 2017.

== Early life and education ==
He was born on 27 September 1952, Sonapur at Sonagazi in Feni to Shariful Huq and Rowshan Ara. His father was an official of the Bangladesh Ansar. He passed SSC from Dinajpur Zilla School in 1970 and intermediate from Govt Science College. He completed his bachelor's degree from the University of Rajshahi and had a master's in economics from the University of Chittagong.

== Career ==
=== Television ===
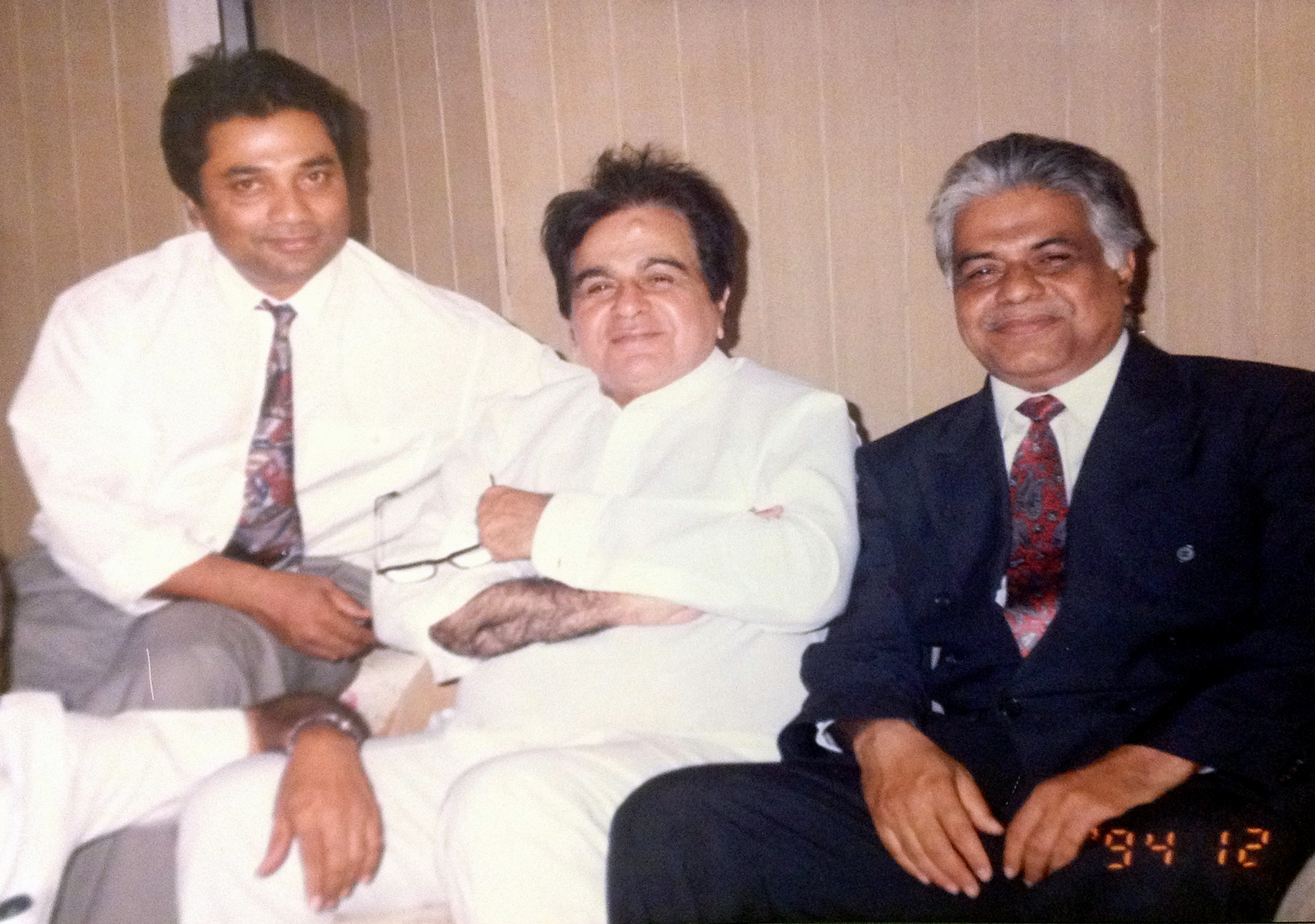
Annisul Huq with A. K. A. Firoze Noon at the home of actor Dilip Kumar in Bombay, India.

Annisul Huq was a regular host on Bangladesh Television in the early 1980s. He hosted interviews with politically significant personalities.

=== Business ===
Annisul Huq established his own business, Mohammadi Group in 1986, and was the chairperson of the company until his death. As of 2007, the group had 7,000 employees in the textile and garments sector. The conglomerate is also involved in real estate, IT, a power generation company that directly contributes to the national grid and a distribution company that represents multiple foreign television channels. The group has an independent TV channel named Nagorik.

Annisul Huq served as the president of several apex bodies including the South Asian Association for Regional Cooperation (SAARC) Chamber of Commerce and Industry, Garment Manufacturers and Exporters Association (BGMEA), Federation of the Bangladesh Chamber of Commerce and Industry (FBCCI) and Independent Power Producers Association.

=== Politics ===
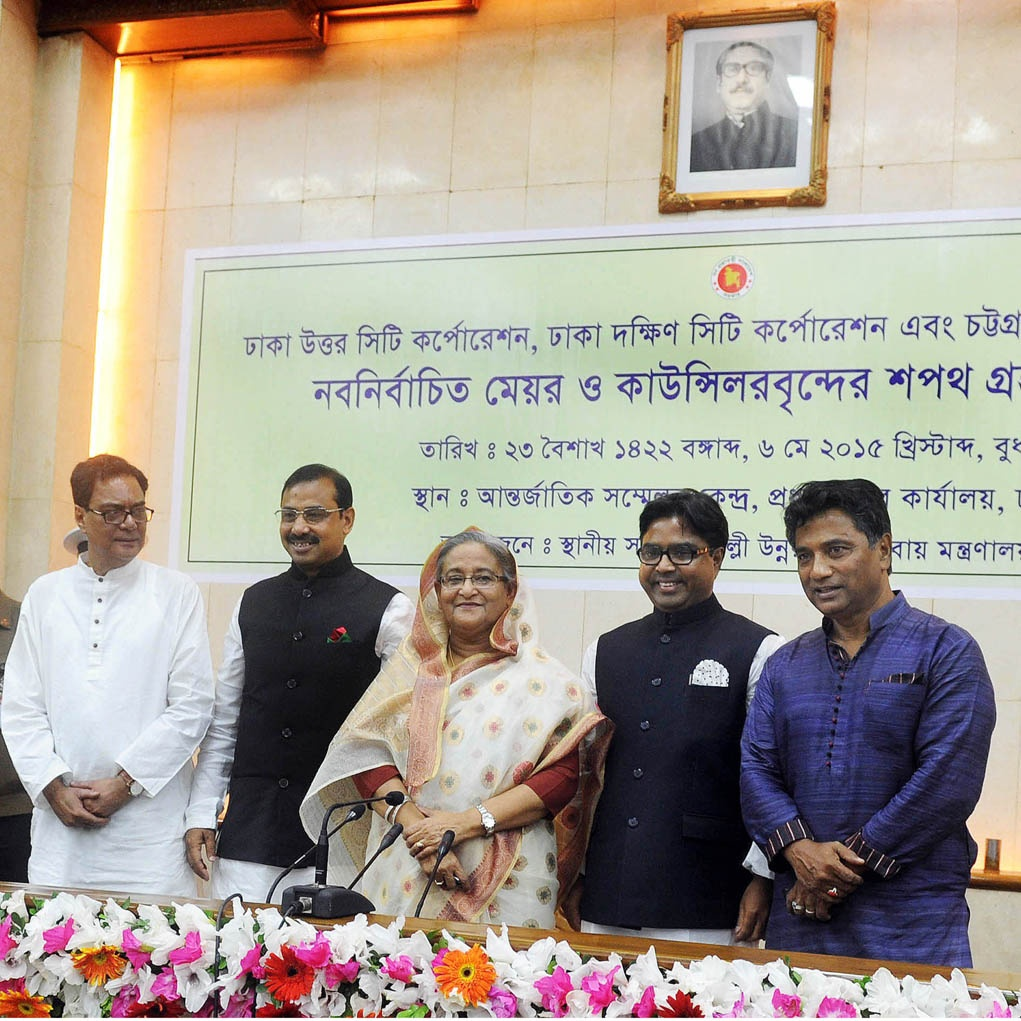
Huq with Sayeed Khokon, Rezaul Karim Chowdhury, Sayed Ashraful Islam and Sheikh Hasina at the oath taking ceremony of the newly appointed Mayors in 2015.

Annisul Huq was elected the mayor of Dhaka North City Corporation on ticket of Bangladesh Awami League in the city corporation election of 2015. He was a surprise pick by the Awami League as no other leaders of the party stood for the position. According to the affidavits submitted to the Election Commission in March 2015, he had amassed a net worth of US$3.25 million.

As mayor, Annisul Huq promised to build Dhaka into a clean, green and safe city, although he received some flak for his involvement of foreigners. 20,000 illegal billboards were removed as part of the clean-up project. Mayor Annisul Huq said he would not put up with resistance from vested interests in his clean-up efforts.

Annisul Huq also promised to reduce corruption among government employees.

== Personal life ==
Annisul Huq's younger brother General Abu Belal Mohammad Shafiul Huq was the 15th chief of the Bangladesh Army. Huq was married to Rubana Huq. They have three children.

== Death ==
In July 2017, Annisul Huq was admitted to a hospital in London. He was diagnosed with cerebral vasculitis. He died on 30 November 2017, after being in a sedative condition for more than three months. He was posthumously granted a National Information and Communication Technology Award.
