= 2026 Andhra Pradesh urban local bodies elections =

- 1 November 2026–26 November 2026

4,951 ward seats across 123 ULBs (Note: totals)
- Registered: 1,24,34,166 (Note: Phase 1 (99,36,014) + Phase 2 (24,98,152) = 1,24,34,166. Phase 1: Prior to the election 118 municipal corporation ward seats and 637 municipality/nagar panchayat ward seats were declared unanimous. Thus, a total of 755 ward seats were declared unanimous. 14 municipality chairpersons and 3 nagar panchayat chairpersons were elected unopposed. Thus, elections were held in the remaining wards. The total voters are 99,36,014 but due to unanimous seats, polls were held not held there making the total remaining registered voters count to be 96,89,061)
- Turnout: 62.16% (Phase 1)
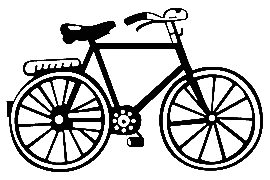

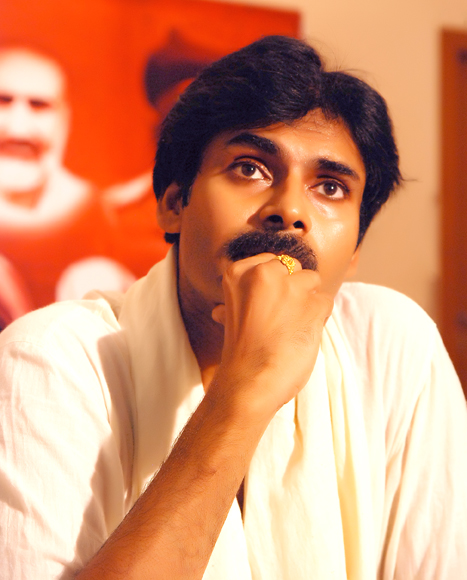

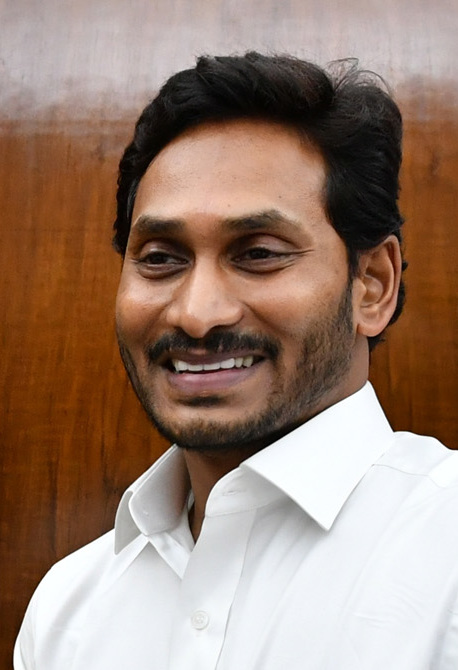

	First party	Second party	Third party
Leader	Palla Srinivasa Rao	Pawan Kalyan	Y. S. Jagan Mohan Reddy
Party	Telugu Desam Party	Janasena Party	YSR Congress Party
Alliance	Kutami	Kutami	None
Seats won	2,591	487	560
Mayor / Chairperson	71	19	4
	Fourth party
Leader	P. V. N. Madhav
Party	Bharatiya Janata Party
Alliance	Kutami
Seats won	153
Mayor / Chairperson	4

Elections were held to elect representatives to 100 urban local bodies (13 municipal corporations, 77 municipalities, and 10 nagara panchayats) in the Indian state of Andhra Pradesh. There were a total of 3,942 ward seats across the 100 urban local bodies, of which, 922 ward seats were in 13 municipal corporations, 2770 ward seats in 77 municipalities, and 250 ward seats in 10 nagara panchayats. Andhra Pradesh State Election Commission notified the election as the 2nd Ordinary elections to urban local bodies.

Repolling was held across 12 polling stations in six urban local bodies on 2 November 2026. Elections for the remaining 260 seats 4 municipal corporations, 652 seats in 16 municipalities and 97 seats in 3 nagara panchayats is scheduled on 26 November 2026.

== Background ==
The five-year tenure of the elected bodies of 86 Urban Local Bodies (ULBs) in Andhra Pradesh concluded on 17 March 2026. The term for an additional 13 ULBs is scheduled to end on 22 November 2026. Out of the 123 total ULBs in the state, elections for 23 have been pending due to earlier legal impediments.

Following the expiration of the terms in March 2026, the Government of Andhra Pradesh issued orders appointing Special Officers including District Collectors, Joint Collectors, and Revenue Divisional Officers to oversee municipal affairs for a period of six months or until new elections can be conducted. Chief Minister N. Chandrababu Naidu and the state government have initiated high-level reviews with ministers and alliance partners to prepare for the upcoming local body polls, which are expected to follow the conclusion of the state's assembly elections earlier in the year.

== Schedule ==
Election schedule for Municipal Corporations, Municipalities and Nagara Panchayats is released on 14th October 2026. The revised schedule was published on 22 October 2026.

=== Phase 1 ===
Event	Date
Date for Nominations	16 October 2026
Last Date for filing Nominations	18 October 2026 (Note: The State Election Commission, in compliance with the orders dt.21.10.2026 of the Hon'ble Supreme Court in SLA(C) No. 3747612026 and in exercise of powers conferred under Article 243K and Article 2432A of the Constitution of India and relevant provisions of the Municipal Acts had ordered to extend the nomination process in 4 Urban Local Bodies indicated in the Annexure for 48 hours i.e., on 23 October 2026 & 24 October 2026 from 11 AM to 3 PM at the places already specified by the Returning Officers / Election Officers on 16 October 2026. The ULBs where the extension was in place was Kadapa MC (11 wards), Rajampeta Municipality (11 wards), Mydukuru Municipality (All wards) and Tirupati MC (18 wards).)
Date for scrutiny of nominations	19 October 2026 (Note: Scrutiny of the fresh nominations received during the extended nomination process is on 25 October 2026)
Date for commencement of withdrawal of candidature	21 October 2026 (Note: Last date of Withdrawal of Candidatures for only those candidates who filed fresh nominations is 25 October 2026)
Publication of list of contesting candidates	25 October 2026
Date of poll	1 November 2026
Date of re-poll, if any	2 November 2026
Date of counting of votes	3 November 2026

=== Phase 2 ===
Event	Date
Date for Nominations	14 November 2026
Last Date for filing Nominations	16 November 2026
Date for scrutiny of nominations	17 November 2026
Date for commencement of withdrawal of candidature	19 November 2026
Publication of list of contesting candidates	19 November 2026
Date of poll	26 November 2026
Date of re-poll, if any	27 November 2026
Date of counting of votes	30 November 2026

== Parties and alliances ==
Alliance/Party		Flag	Symbol	Leader
Kutami	Telugu Desam Party			Palla Srinivasa Rao
Kutami	Janasena Party			Pawan Kalyan
Kutami	Bharatiya Janata Party			P. V. N. Madhav
YSR Congress Party				Y. S. Jagan Mohan Reddy
INDIA	Indian National Congress			Y. S. Sharmila
Communist Party of India (Marxist)				V. Srinivasa Rao
Communist Party of India				Gujjula Eshwarayya

== Turnout ==
Turnout
Phase	Phase 1	Phase 2	Totals
Total urban local bodies	100	23	123
Total wards	3,942 (Note: totalse)	1,009	4,951
Total electors	99,36,014 (Note: totalvo)	24,98,152	1,24,34,166
Total voters	60,22,411		
Total turnout (%)	62.16		

=== Municipal Corporations ===
Phase	Municipal Corporation	Total electors	Total voters	Total turnout (%)
Phase 1	Greater Visakhapatnam	18,37,901	10,35,154	56.32
Phase 1	Vijayawada	8,05,797	4,46,196	55.37
Phase 1	Guntur	6,18,714	3,47,438	56.15
Phase 1	Nellore	4,89,351	2,82,466	57.72
Phase 1	Kurnool	4,79,861	2,58,035	53.77
Phase 1	Kadapa	3,06,834	2,13,488	69.58
Phase 1	Tirupati	2,90,492	1,36,081	46.85
Phase 1	Ananthapuram	2,37,007	1,32,997	56.12
Phase 1	Eluru	2,37,256	1,41,506	59.64
Phase 1	Ongole	1,92,873	1,37,456	71.27
Phase 1	Vizianagaram	2,23,050	1,40,366	62.93
Phase 1	Chittoor	1,48,583	92,722	62.40
Phase 1	Machilipatnam	1,39,246	98,627	70.83
Phase 2	Srikakulam			
Phase 2	Kakinada			
Phase 2	Rajamahendravaram			
Phase 2	Mangalagiri – Tadepalli			

=== Municipalities ===
Phase	District	Municipality	Total electors	Total voters	Total turnout (%)
Phase 1	Srikakulam	Ichchapuram	31452	20616	65.55
Phase 1	Srikakulam	Palasa–Kasibugga	49420	34667	70.15
Phase 1	Vizianagaram	Bobbili	49284	35041	71.10
Phase 1	Parvathipuram Manyam	Parvathipuram	40765	28064	68.84
Phase 1	Parvathipuram Manyam	Salur	41934	27526	65.64
Phase 1	Anakapalli	Elamanchili	36526	27882	76.33
Phase 1	Anakapalli	Narsipatnam	49099	35775	72.86
Phase 1	East Godavari	Kovvur	34452	23575	68.43
Phase 1	East Godavari	Nidadavolu	35086	24315	69.30
Phase 1	East Godavari	Mandapeta	49059	38040	77.54
Phase 1	Kakinada	Gollaprolu	20846	16024	76.87
Phase 1	Kakinada	Peddapuram	41528	28032	67.50
Phase 1	Kakinada	Pithapuram	43307	32680	75.46
Phase 1	Kakinada	Samarlakota	43865	30990	70.65
Phase 1	Kakinada	Tuni	43036	28334	65.84
Phase 1	Kakinada	Yeleswaram	25472	18380	72.16
Phase 1	Konaseema	Amalapuram	41079	29525	71.87
Phase 1	Konaseema	Ramachandrapuram	35728	25270	70.73
Phase 1	West Godavari	Narasapuram	46996	33354	70.97
Phase 1	Eluru	Nuzvid	42952	31057	72.31
Phase 1	Eluru	Jangareddygudem	48463	29591	61.06
Phase 1	Krishna	Pedana	25373	20151	79.42
Phase 1	Krishna	Vuyyuru	32793	24979	76.17
Phase 1	NTR	Jaggayyapeta	43935	32073	73
Phase 1	NTR	Kondapalli	52530	37870	72.09
Phase 1	NTR	Nandigama	36641	26626	72.67
Phase 1	NTR	Tiruvuru	28357	20806	73.37
Phase 1	Guntur	Tenali	157089	91270	58.10
Phase 1	Palnadu	Chilakaluripet	86554	60741	70.18
Phase 1	Palnadu	Macherla	46520	32312	69.46
Phase 1	Palnadu	Piduguralla	Election not held (Note: All the wards were declared unanimous)		
Phase 1	Palnadu	Sattenapalle	48196	36813	76.38
Phase 1	Palnadu	Vinukonda	47186	36719	77.82
Phase 1	Bapatla	Chirala	69557	51025	73.36
Phase 1	Bapatla	Repalle	37008	25561	69.07
Phase 1	Prakasam	Addanki	31895	25492	79.92
Phase 1	Prakasam	Chimakurthy	22876	19298	84.36
Phase 1	Prakasam	Darsi	Election not held		
Phase 1	Markapuram	Giddaluru	30633	22546	73.60
Phase 1	Markapuram	Kanigiri	2429	2037	83.86
Phase 1	Markapuram	Markapuram	56113	41692	74.30
Phase 1	Nellore	Atmakur	26529	19535	73.64
Phase 1	Nellore	Buchireddypalem	36438	23373	64.14
Phase 1	Tirupati	Naidupeta	37100	27285	73.54
Phase 1	Tirupati	Puttur	40210	31657	78.73
Phase 1	Tirupati	Sullurpeta	35519	23150	65.18
Phase 1	Tirupati	Venkatagiri	44140	30568	69.25
Phase 1	Chittoor	Kuppam	40535	31245	77.08
Phase 1	Chittoor	Nagari	43247	34066	78.77
Phase 1	Chittoor	Palamaner	42500	30936	72.79
Phase 1	Annamayya	Madanapalle	116958	71924	61.50
Phase 1	Annamayya	Punganur	5073	3220	63.47
Phase 1	Annamayya	Rayachoty	Election not held		
Phase 1	Kadapa	Badvel	1643	1320	80.34
Phase 1	Kadapa	Jammalamadugu	38445	30206	78.57
Phase 1	Kadapa	Mydukur	17297	12491	72.21
Phase 1	Kadapa	Proddatur	Election not held		
Phase 1	Kadapa	Pulivendula	54466	38482	70.65
Phase 1	Kadapa	Rajampeta	18966	11065	58.34
Phase 1	Kadapa	Yerraguntla	958	706	73.70
Phase 1	Ananthapuram	Guntakal	113855	70373	61.81
Phase 1	Ananthapuram	Gooty	6171	3394	55.00
Phase 1	Ananthapuram	Kalyandurg	36622	26791	73.16
Phase 1	Ananthapuram	Rayadurgam	53696	40776	75.94
Phase 1	Ananthapuram	Tadipatri	87641	59895	68.34
Phase 1	Sri Sathya Sai	Dharmavaram	106250	82663	77.80
Phase 1	Sri Sathya Sai	Hindupur	131427	89392	68.02
Phase 1	Sri Sathya Sai	Kadiri	80937	55618	68.72
Phase 1	Sri Sathya Sai	Penukonda	22327	17991	80.58
Phase 1	Sri Sathya Sai	Puttaparthi	26890	20166	74.99
Phase 1	Kurnool	Adoni	176676	94697	53.60
Phase 1	Kurnool	Yemmiganur	84939	57673	67.90
Phase 1	Nandyal	Allagadda	Election not held		
Phase 1	Nandyal	Atmakur	4370	3200	73.23
Phase 1	Nandyal	Dhone	52176	35397	67.84
Phase 1	Nandyal	Nandyal	199238	124501	62.49
Phase 1	Nandyal	Nandikotkur	36332	29193	80.35
Phase 2	Srikakulam	Amudalavalasa			
Phase 2	Vizianagaram	Rajam			
Phase 2	West Godavari	Bhimavaram			
Phase 2	West Godavari	Palakollu			
Phase 2	West Godavari	Tadepalligudem			
Phase 2	West Godavari	Tanuku			
Phase 2	Krishna	Gudivada			
Phase 2	Krishna	Tadigadapa			
Phase 2	Guntur	Ponnur			
Phase 2	Palnadu	Narasaraopet			
Phase 2	Bapatla	Bapatla			
Phase 2	Prakasam	Kandukur			
Phase 2	Nellore	Gudur			
Phase 2	Nellore	Kavali			
Phase 2	Tirupati	Srikalahasti			

=== Nagara Panchayats ===
Phase	District	Nagara Panchayat	Total electors	Total voters	Total turnout (%)
Phase 1	Vizianagaram	Nellimarla	19,075	15,320	80.31
Phase 1	Parvathipuram Manyam	Palakonda	23,466	16,344	69.65
Phase 1	Konaseema	Mummidivaram	21,228	15,955	75.16
Phase 1	West Godavari	Akividu	26,435	19,686	74.47
Phase 1	Palnadu	Dachepalle	Election not held		
Phase 1	Palnadu	Gurazala	Election not held		
Phase 1	Kadapa	Kamalapuram	Election not held		
Phase 1	Sri Sathya Sai	Madakasira	17,337	13,515	77.95
Phase 1	Kurnool	Gudur	17,665	14,791	83.73
Phase 1	Nandyal	Bethamcherla	31,285	24,570	78.54
Phase 2	Eluru	Chintalapudi			
Phase 2	Markapuram	Podili			
Phase 2	Nellore	Allur			
Phase 2	Annamayya	B. Kothakota			

== Results by party ==
Alliance/Party		Popular vote			Seats		
Alliance/Party		Votes	%	±pp	Contested	Won	+/−
Kutami	Telugu Desam Party					2,591	
Kutami	Janasena Party					487	
Kutami	Bharatiya Janata Party					153	
Kutami	Total					3,231	
YSR Congress Party						560	
INDIA	Indian National Congress					10	
Communist Party of India (Marxist)						6	
Communist Party of India						6	
Other parties						3	
Independents						125	
NOTA							
Total							
Vote statistics
Valid votes							
Invalid votes							
Votes cast/Turnout		60,22,411					
Abstentions							
Registered voters		99,36,014					

== Results by ward ==
Urban local body	Wards					
Urban local body	Wards	Kutami			YSRCP	Others
Urban local body	Wards	TDP	JSP	BJP	YSRCP	Others
Municipal Corporations	922	595	135	42	112	38
Municipalities	2,770	1,839	316	106	405	103
Nagara Panchayats	250	157	36	5	43	9
Total	3,942 (Note: Election in the 20th ward of Atmakur, Nandyal district was postponed so the total wards would be 3,941)	2,591	487	153	560	150 (Note: Independents – 125; INC – 10; CPI – 6; – 6; – 1; Others – 2)

=== Municipal Corporations ===
Municipal Corporation	Divisions					
Municipal Corporation	Divisions	Kutami			YSRCP	Others
Municipal Corporation	Divisions	TDP	JSP	BJP	YSRCP	Others
Phase 1
Greater Visakhapatnam	120	64	26	8	13	9
Vijayawada	86	54	17	5	8	2
Guntur	76	48	13	3	11	1
Nellore	72	56	8	6	0	2
Kurnool	68	52	2	3	11	0
Kadapa	66	58	2	4	2	0
Tirupati	66	38	19	3	3	3
Ananthapuram	62	30	6	1	21	4
Eluru	62	34	14	3	3	8
Ongole	62	39	8	1	11	3
Vizianagaram	62	35	6	3	16	2
Chittoor	60	52	2	1	4	1
Machilipatnam	60	35	12	1	9	3
Phase 1 Total	922	595	135	42	112	38
Phase 2
Srikakulam	60					
Kakinada	66					
Rajamahendravaram	72					
Mangalagiri – Tadepalli	62					
Phase 2 Total	260					
Total	1,182					

=== Municipalities ===
District	Municipality	Wards					
District	Municipality	Wards	Kutami			YSRCP	Others
District	Municipality	Wards	TDP	JSP	BJP	YSRCP	Others
Phase 1
Srikakulam	Ichchapuram	28	15	4	0	7	2
Srikakulam	Palasa–Kasibugga	36	27	3	1	4	1
Vizianagaram	Bobbili	36	24	3	1	4	4
Parvathipuram Manyam	Parvathipuram	36	24	2	1	6	3
Parvathipuram Manyam	Salur	32	11	4	1	13	3
Anakapalli	Elamanchili	32	12	11	2	6	1
Anakapalli	Narsipatnam	40	35	3	0	1	1
East Godavari	Kovvur	28	20	6	2	0	0
East Godavari	Nidadavolu	32	13	14	1	3	1
East Godavari	Mandapeta	36	24	10	2	0	0
Kakinada	Gollaprolu	23	6	13	0	0	4
Kakinada	Peddapuram	32	19	11	1	1	0
Kakinada	Pithapuram	36	5	19	1	1	10
Kakinada	Samarlakota	36	20	12	0	4	0
Kakinada	Tuni	36	18	5	1	10	2
Kakinada	Yeleswaram	28	15	5	1	7	0
Konaseema	Amalapuram	36	18	11	1	6	0
Konaseema	Ramachandrapuram	32	14	12	1	5	0
West Godavari	Narasapuram	36	15	15	1	4	1
Eluru	Nuzvid	36	21	2	0	12	1
Eluru	Jangareddygudem	32	20	6	1	3	2
Krishna	Pedana	28	19	6	0	3	0
Krishna	Vuyyuru	32	22	7	0	2	1
NTR	Jaggayyapeta	36	26	7	1	2	0
NTR	Kondapalli	40	23	6	1	7	3
NTR	Nandigama	32	22	3	1	5	1
NTR	Tiruvuru	28	17	3	1	3	4
Guntur	Tenali	52	29	16	1	6	0
Palnadu	Chilakaluripet	48	39	6	1	2	0
Palnadu	Macherla	36	32	3	1	0	0
Palnadu	Piduguralla	40	36	2	2	0	0
Palnadu	Sattenapalle	36	23	4	1	8	0
Palnadu	Vinukonda	36	21	3	3	8	1
Bapatla	Chirala	44	22	2	1	8	11 (Note: INC – 10)
Bapatla	Repalle	36	28	3	1	3	1
Prakasam	Addanki	32	25	4	0	2	1
Prakasam	Chimakurthy	28	21	2	0	5	0
Prakasam	Darsi	28	24	3	1	0	0
Markapuram	Giddaluru	28	22	3	2	1	0
Markapuram	Kanigiri	32	29	1	2	0	0
Markapuram	Markapuram	40	31	6	2	1	0
Nellore	Atmakur	28	14	2	1	10	1
Nellore	Buchireddypalem	28	18	3	2	5	0
Tirupati	Naidupeta	32	15	0	4	12	1
Tirupati	Puttur	36	30	2	0	4	0
Tirupati	Sullurpeta	32	26	1	2	3	0
Tirupati	Venkatagiri	36	29	1	2	4	0
Chittoor	Kuppam	32	31	0	0	0	1
Chittoor	Nagari	40	31	1	0	8	0
Chittoor	Palamaner	36	26	2	0	8	0
Annamayya	Madanapalle	48	22	6	4	12	4
Annamayya	Punganur	36	30	2	2	0	2 (Note: CPI – 1)
Annamayya	Rayachoty	44	40	1	3	0	0
Kadapa	Badvel	40	36	2	0	0	2
Kadapa	Jammalamadugu	32	20	2	10	0	0
Kadapa	Mydukur	32	29	1	1	0	0
Kadapa	Proddatur	52	51	1	0	0	0
Kadapa	Pulivendula	40	34	1	2	3	0
Kadapa	Rajampeta	32	24	1	1	4	2
Kadapa	Yerraguntla	28	19	0	9	0	0
Ananthapuram	Guntakal	48	25	0	1	15	6 (Note: CPI – 1)
Ananthapuram	Gooty	32	29	2	1	0	0
Ananthapuram	Kalyandurg	32	27	0	1	4	0
Ananthapuram	Rayadurgam	40	32	3	2	2	1
Ananthapuram	Tadipatri	48	45	1	2	0	0
Sri Sathya Sai	Dharmavaram	48	29	4	7	7	1
Sri Sathya Sai	Hindupur	52	30	5	4	11	2
Sri Sathya Sai	Kadiri	44	27	0	0	17	0
Sri Sathya Sai	Penukonda	23	21	1	1	0	0
Sri Sathya Sai	Puttaparthi	28	22	1	0	5	0
Kurnool	Adoni	52	30	0	3	16	3
Kurnool	Yemmiganur	44	38	1	1	2	2
Nandyal	Allagadda	32	22	2	0	8	0
Nandyal	Atmakur	32	17	10	1	1	2 (Note: CPM – 1)
Nandyal	Dhone	36	15	2	0	16	3
Nandyal	Nandyal	52	25	0	1	26	0
Nandyal	Nandikotkur	32	9	0	0	23	0
Phase 1 Total		2,770	1,839	316	106	405	103
Phase 2
Srikakulam	Amudalavalasa	28					
Vizianagaram	Rajam	32					
West Godavari	Bhimavaram	58					
West Godavari	Palakollu	44					
West Godavari	Tadepalligudem	48					
West Godavari	Tanuku	44					
Krishna	Gudivada	48					
Krishna	Tadigadapa	48					
Guntur	Ponnur	40					
Palnadu	Narasaraopet	48					
Bapatla	Bapatla	44					
Prakasam	Kandukur	40					
Nellore	Gudur	48					
Nellore	Kavali	44					
Tirupati	Srikalahasti	44					
Phase 2 Total		652					
Total		3,422					

=== Nagara Panchayats ===
District	Nagara Panchayat	Wards					
District	Nagara Panchayat	Wards	Kutami			YSRCP	Others
District	Nagara Panchayat	Wards	TDP	JSP	BJP	YSRCP	Others
Phase 1
Vizianagaram	Nellimarla	23	10	5	0	2	6
Parvathipuram Manyam	Palakonda	28	9	13	1	4	1
Konaseema	Mummidivaram	23	14	3	0	6	0
West Godavari	Akividu	28	14	7	2	5	0
Palnadu	Dachepalle	28	24	4	0	0	0
Palnadu	Gurazala	23	21	2	0	0	0
Kadapa	Kamalapuram	23	22	0	1	0	0
Sri Sathya Sai	Madakasira	23	22	1	0	0	0
Kurnool	Gudur	23	11	1	1	8	2
Nandyal	Bethamcherla	28	10	0	0	18	0
Total		250	157	36	5	43	9
Phase 2
Eluru	Chintalapudi	23					
Markapuram	Podili	28					
Nellore	Allur	23					
Annamayya	B. Kothakota	23					
Phase 2 Total		97					
Total		347					

== Results by mayor/chairperson ==
YSR Congress declared 1st list with 7 mayor, 14,6 chairperson posts. TDP declared 1st list with 7 mayor, 26, 3 chairperson posts Janasena announced candidates for 2 municipal corporations and 12 municipalities.

Urban local body	Total					
Urban local body	Total	Kutami			YSRCP	Others
Urban local body	Total	TDP	JSP	BJP	YSRCP	Others
Municipal Corporations (Mayor)	13	10	2	0	1	0
Municipalities (Chairperson)	77	57	14	3	2	1
Nagara Panchayats (Chairperson)	10	4	3	1	1	1
Total	100	71	19	4	4	2

=== Municipal Corporations ===
Phase	Municipal Corporation	Winner				Runner Up				Margin
Phase	Municipal Corporation	Candidate	Party	Votes	%	Candidate	Party	Votes	%	Margin
Phase 1	Vizianagaram (UR-W)	Avanapu Bhargavi	TDP	76,074	54.20	Kolagatla Sravani	YSRCP	57,519	40.98	18,555
Phase 1	Visakhaptanam (UR-W)	Mukka Sravani	TDP	5,85,454	57.27	Varudu Kalyani	YSRCP	3,40,810	33.34	2,44,644
Phase 1	Eluru (BC)	Reddy Appala Naidu	JSP	77,078	54.47	Ganta Mohana Rao	YSRCP	37,929	26.80	44,661
Phase 1	Machilipatnam (BC-W)	Shaik Abdul Abida	TDP	62,930	64.02	Lanka Jyothi	YSRCP	30,273	30.80	32,657
Phase 1	Vijayawada (UR)	Vangaveeti Radha Krishna	JSP	2,65,968	59.61	Rayana Bhagya Lakshmi	YSRCP	1,35,056	30.27	1,30,872
Phase 1	Guntur (UR-W)	Kovelamudi Lakshmi Aparna	TDP	2,08,925	61.87	T. A. V. Naga Padma Sridevi	YSRCP	1,12,631	33.35	96,294
Phase 1	Ongole (UR)	Nallamalli Sri Shilpa	TDP	82,674	60.15	Kuppam Prasad	YSRCP	45,048	32.77	37,626
Phase 1	Nellore (UR)	Poluboina Roopkumar Yadav	TDP	1,70,440	60.34	Anam Vijayakumar Reddy	YSRCP	89,719	31.76	80,721
Phase 1	Tirupati (UR)	Manne Srinivasa Prasad	TDP	95,242	71.46	Y. Vasudeva Yadav	YSRCP	33,446	25.09	61,796
Phase 1	Chittoor (BC)	Katari Hemalatha	TDP	61,278	65.95	Ramaswamy Chandrasekhar	YSRCP	27,162	29.23	34,116
Phase 1	Kadapa (UR-W)	Matli Suvarna	TDP	1,31,615	61.65	Bandi Deepti Reddy	YSRCP	66,027	30.93	65,588
Phase 1	Kurnool (SC-W)	B. Vijaya Pratyusha	TDP	1,28,888	51.71	Uthakalla Suseela	YSRCP	1,01,855	40.87	27,033
Phase 1	Ananthapuram (BC)	B. C. Ramesh Goud	YSRCP	62,219	46.78	Kotla Ajesh Babu	BJP	56,238	42.28	5,981
Phase 2	Srikakulam (UR-W)									
Phase 2	Kakinada (BC-W)									
Phase 2	Rajamahendravaram (SC)									
Phase 2	Mangalagiri – Tadepalli (ST)									

=== Municipalities ===
Phase	District	Municipality	Winner				Runner Up				Margin
Phase	District	Municipality	Candidate	Party	Votes	%	Candidate	Party	Votes	%	Margin
Phase 1	Srikakulam	Ichchapuram (BC-W)	Aasi Leelarani	TDP	12,624	61.20	Pilaka Rajalakshmi	YSRCP	6,790	32.92	5,834
Phase 1	Srikakulam	Palasa–Kasibugga (UR-W)	Vajja Ganga Bhavani	TDP	19,541	56.41	Talasu Sripadma	YSRCP	10,716	30.90	8,845
Phase 1	Vizianagaram	Bobbili (UR-W)	Rambarki Renukadevi Swapna	TDP	19,460	54.20	Tumula Achyuthavalli	YSRCP	14,276	39.76	5,184
Phase 1	Parvathipuram Manyam	Parvathipuram (UR-W)	Belagam Karuna	TDP			Patnana Sai Sri	YSRCP			4,988
Phase 1	Parvathipuram Manyam	Salur (BC-W)	Gorle Vijayakumari	JSP	9,686	35.19	Bavireddy Ribika Rani	YSRCP	9,390	34.11	296
Phase 1	Anakapalli	Elamanchili (UR-W)	Pilla Ramakumari	BJP	12,949	46.60	Boddapu Tulasi	YSRCP	9,831	35.38	3,118
Phase 1	Anakapalli	Narsipatnam (BC-W)	Chintakayala Padmavathi	TDP	23,028	64.39	Chintakayala Anitha	YSRCP	11,573	32.36	11,455
Phase 1	East Godavari	Kovvur (UR-W)	Kanthamani Vijayalakshmi	TDP	16,173	68.48	Gandrothu Anjali Devi	YSRCP	6,505	27.54	9,668
Phase 1	East Godavari	Nidadavolu (SC-W)	Murala Jyothi	JSP	14,922	61.23	Vedala Vijaya Lakshmi	YSRCP	8,340	34.22	6,582
Phase 1	East Godavari	Mandapeta (UR)	Vegulla Ajay Kumar	TDP	27,187	71.40	Dr. Katravathu Ramu	YSRCP	9,192	24.14	17,995
Phase 1	Kakinada	Gollaprolu (UR)	Kadari Tammayya Naidu	JSP	11,757	73.36	Chakkapalli Nageswara Rao	YSRCP	3,320	20.72	8,437
Phase 1	Kakinada	Peddapuram (UR)	Raja Suribabu Raju	TDP	20,142	71.85	Kapaganti Soundarya Laxmi	YSRCP	6,264	22.35	13,878
Phase 1	Kakinada	Pithapuram (SC)	Danam Lazar Babu	JSP	20,052	61.41	Pedapati Rajesh Kumar	YSRCP	10,817	33.13	9,235
Phase 1	Kakinada	Samarlakota (SC)	Pitta Janaki Ramarao	JSP	19,995	64.51	Ooba John Moses	YSRCP	9,021	29.10	10,970
Phase 1	Kakinada	Tuni (BC-W)	Sarakanam Srilatha	JSP	15,470	54.60	Pitla Rama Tulasi	YSRCP	11,408	40.26	4,062
Phase 1	Kakinada	Yeleswaram (SC-W)	Yarlagadda Akshitha	TDP	8,984	48.88	Badireddy Aashalatha	YSRCP	8,730	47.50	254
Phase 1	Konaseema	Amalapuram (UR)	Nalla Sridhar	JSP	20,174	68.33	Dudala Veeritha Devi	YSRCP	8,195	27.76	11,979
Phase 1	Konaseema	Ramachandrapuram (BC)	Medisetti Sesharao	TDP	16,121	63.79	Chinthapalli Nageswara Rao	YSRCP	8,281	32.77	7,840
Phase 1	West Godavari	Narasapuram (UR-W)	Kothapalli Sailaja	JSP	24,580	73.71	Kavali Ramaseetha	YSRCP	7,511	22.52	17,069
Phase 1	Eluru	Nuzvid (SC)	Barre Ilaiaraja	TDP	16,701	53.44	Kancharla Lavakumar	YSRCP	12,686	40.59	4,015
Phase 1	Eluru	Jangareddygudem (BC-W)	Rongala Anusha	TDP	18,088	60.82	Meka Satyavathi	YSRCP	10,516	35.56	7,572
Phase 1	Krishna	Pedana (UR-W)	Nagalinga Jyosthna Rani	JSP	11,042	54.80	Katakam Nagakumari	YSRCP	7,633	37.88	3,409
Phase 1	Krishna	Vuyyuru (SC)	Chedurthipati Praveen Kumar	TDP	14,316	57.31	Paidimukkala Divya	YSRCP	9,523	38.12	4,793
Phase 1	NTR	Jaggayyapeta (UR-W)	Narendrula Vineetha	TDP	22,975	71.08	Shaik Hafeezunnisa	YSRCP	7,765	24.02	15,210
Phase 1	NTR	Kondapalli (SC-W)	Kanneganti Amulya	TDP	22,334	58.79	Nallamothu Tejaswi	YSRCP	12,836	33.79	9,498
Phase 1	NTR	Nandigama (UR)	Sakhamuru Vamsidhar	TDP	15,901	58.76	Challa Brahmeswara Rao	YSRCP	10,239	37.84	5,662
Phase 1	NTR	Tiruvuru (BC)	Pasupuleti Madhavi	JSP	11,141	52.91	Parasa Srinivasa Rao	YSRCP	8,264	39.25	2,877
Phase 1	Guntur	Tenali (UR)	Thotakura Venkataramana Rao	JSP	51,020	56.89	Maddali Seshachalam	YSRCP	33,927	37.83	17,093
Phase 1	Palnadu	Chilakaluripet (UR-W)	Thota Rajarajeswari	JSP	41,282	69.17	Shaik Kareemun	YSRCP	12,088	20.26	29,194
Phase 1	Palnadu	Macherla (UR-W)	Yenumula Sushma	TDP	26,722	82.56	Shaik Sulthana	YSRCP	3,531	10.91	23,191
Phase 1	Palnadu	Piduguralla (BC)	Shaik Baba Vali	TDP	Unanimous						
Phase 1	Palnadu	Sattenapalle (BC)	Marella Ramanjaneyulu	TDP			Shaik Nagur Meeran	YSRCP			9,852
Phase 1	Palnadu	Vinukonda (UR)	Cherukupalem Shamim Khan	TDP	19,746	53.72	Pathan Saleha Khan	YSRCP	14,301	38.91	5,445
Phase 1	Bapatla	Chirala (SC-W)	Yericharla Honey Spandana	TDP	21,883	42.81	Dr. Isterla Sherli	YSRCP	15,415	30.16	6,468
Phase 1	Bapatla	Repalle (UR-W)	Kurra Aparna	TDP	19,643	76.85	Chimata Lakshmi	YSRCP	5,272	20.63	14,371
Phase 1	Prakasam	Addanki (UR)	Kakani Ashok	TDP	16,008	62.84	Udathu Suresh	YSRCP	8,515	33.42	7,473
Phase 1	Prakasam	Chimakurthy (UR)	Siddha Sudhakar	TDP	11,069	57	Medagam Sridevi	YSRCP	7,991	41.15	3,078
Phase 1	Prakasam	Darsi (UR)	Daram Subbarao	TDP	Unanimous						
Phase 1	Markapuram	Giddaluru (UR)	Jaadi Venkatanarayana	BJP	11,007	48.76	Bhuma Balanarasimha Reddy	YSRCP	10,115	44.81	892
Phase 1	Markapuram	Kanigiri (UR-W)	Atchala Tirupatamma	TDP	Unanimous						
Phase 1	Markapuram	Markapuram (UR)	V. S. V. Mallikarjuna Rao	TDP	27,345	65.59	Cheppalli Kanakadurga	YSRCP	11,052	26.51	16,293
Phase 1	Nellore	Atmakur (UR-W)	Dr. Bommireddi Shakeela	TDP	10,581	54.16	Allareddy Indumathi	YSRCP	8,375	42.87	2,206
Phase 1	Nellore	Buchireddypalem (UR-W)	Dodla Vijayalakshmi	TDP	15,315	65.52	Shaik Shakeela Begum	YSRCP	7,011	29.99	8,304
Phase 1	Tirupati	Naidupeta (UR-W)	Tambireddy Rajeswaramma	YSRCP	13,787	51.53	Shakira	TDP	12,600	47.10	1,187
Phase 1	Tirupati	Puttur (BC)	D. N. Elumalai	JSP	20,306	64.14	Jayaprakash	YSRCP	10,132	32.14	10,174
Phase 1	Tirupati	Sullurpeta (SC-W)	Pitla Suhasini	TDP	15,468	66.82	M. Vimala Kumari	YSRCP	6,740	29.11	8,728
Phase 1	Tirupati	Venkatagiri (UR-W)	Donthu Sarada	TDP	20,256	45.89	B. Deevena	YSRCP	9,620	21.79	10,636
Phase 1	Chittoor	Kuppam (SC)	S. Rajkumar	TDP	22,622	72.22	B. Vijayakumar	YSRCP	7,086	22.62	15,536
Phase 1	Chittoor	Nagari (UR)	E. N. Srinivasan	TDP	Unanimous						
Phase 1	Chittoor	Palamaner (UR-W)	Rajyalakshmi	TDP	16,728	54.07	Srilakshmi	YSRCP	13,253	42.84	3,475
Phase 1	Annamayya	Madanapalle (BC)	Gundlapalli Sriram Chinababu	TDP	37,832	53.07	Chalapathi	YSRCP	28,199	39.55	9,633
Phase 1	Annamayya	Punganur (BC-W)	Nayeem Taj	TDP	Unanimous						
Phase 1	Annamayya	Rayachoty (BC)	Shaik Khadar Vali	TDP	Unanimous						
Phase 1	Kadapa	Badvel (UR)	Somesula Divyateja	TDP	Unanimous						
Phase 1	Kadapa	Jammalamadugu (UR-W)	Chadipiralla Jyothi	TDP	25,066	82.84	N. Haimavathi	YSRCP	4,829	15.96	20,237
Phase 1	Kadapa	Mydukur (UR)	Dhanapala Jaganmohan	TDP	Unanimous						
Phase 1	Kadapa	Proddatur (UR)	Nandyala Raghava Reddy	TDP	Unanimous						
Phase 1	Kadapa	Pulivendula (UR-W)	Thugutla Geetha Kumari	TDP	25,434	66.95	Y. S. Prameela	YSRCP	11,559	30.42	13,875
Phase 1	Kadapa	Rajampeta (BC-W)	Dontham Gayathri	TDP	Unanimous						
Phase 1	Kadapa	Yerraguntla (BC-W)	Gorla Madhulatha	BJP	Unanimous						
Phase 1	Ananthapuram	Guntakal (BC-W)	Yashodha	TDP	36,127	51.33	Venkata Lakhsmi	YSRCP	29,570	42.01	6,657
Phase 1	Ananthapuram	Gooty (SC-W)	Tamil Selvi	TDP	Unanimous						
Phase 1	Ananthapuram	Kalyandurg (UR-W)	Butna Lakshmi	TDP	18,752	69.99	Mounika	YSRCP	7,176	26.79	11,576
Phase 1	Ananthapuram	Rayadurgam (UR)	Tankasala Hanumanthu	TDP	27,385	67.15	Poralla Sivakumar	YSRCP	11,788	28.91	15,597
Phase 1	Ananthapuram	Tadipatri (BC)	Yerragudi Reshma Parveen	TDP	41,261	68.94	Fayaz Basha	YSRCP	16,400	27.40	24,861
Phase 1	Sri Sathya Sai	Dharmavaram (UR)	Parise Sudhakar	TDP	49,662	60.99	Kacharla Anjaneyulu	YSRCP	28,603	35.13	21,059
Phase 1	Sri Sathya Sai	Hindupur (BC)	P. S. Manjunath	TDP	52,524	62.38	Shajia	YSRCP	31,564	37.49	20,960
Phase 1	Sri Sathya Sai	Kadiri (BC-W)	Shaik Arishiabhanu	TDP	27,206	48.92	Attar Parveen	YSRCP	26,301	47.29	905
Phase 1	Sri Sathya Sai	Penukonda (BC)	A. Trivendramurthy	TDP	11,300	62.55	Srinivasulu	YSRCP	4,947	27.38	6,353
Phase 1	Sri Sathya Sai	Puttaparthi (BC)	M. Eeshwar	JSP	10,319	51.17	Boya Vanam Avinash	YSRCP	8,742	43.35	1,577
Phase 1	Kurnool	Adoni (UR-W)	Swapna Nayakar	IND	36,293	38.33	T. Mani	TDP	30,510	32.22	2,062
Phase 1	Kurnool	Yemmiganur (UR)	Machani Sunitha	TDP	36,293	62.70	K. S. Raghu	YSRCP	13,417	23.18	22,777
Phase 1	Nandyal	Allagadda (BC-W)	Shaik Aneesha	TDP	Unanimous						
Phase 1	Nandyal	Atmakur (ST)	Dr. Govindarajulu	TDP	Unanimous						
Phase 1	Nandyal	Dhone (UR-W)	Kotla Sujathamma	TDP	17,071	48.23	Boya Chaitanya	YSRCP	16,696	47.17	375
Phase 1	Nandyal	Nandyal (BC)	Pothuganti Baban	TDP	61,502	49.40	Dalmeel Ameer	YSRCP	53,095	42.65	8,407
Phase 1	Nandyal	Nandikotkur (BC-W)	Shaik Fathimabi	YSRCP	14,619	50.03	Saberunni	TDP	11,999	41.06	2,620
Phase 2	Srikakulam	Amudalavalasa (UR-W)									
Phase 2	Vizianagaram	Rajam (BC-W)									
Phase 2	West Godavari	Bhimavaram (UR-W)									
Phase 2	West Godavari	Palakollu (BC-W)									
Phase 2	West Godavari	Tadepalligudem (UR-W)									
Phase 2	West Godavari	Tanuku (UR-W)									
Phase 2	Krishna	Gudivada (BC-W)									
Phase 2	Krishna	Tadigadapa (BC)									
Phase 2	Guntur	Ponnur (UR-W)									
Phase 2	Palnadu	Narasaraopet (UR)									
Phase 2	Bapatla	Bapatla (SC)									
Phase 2	Prakasam	Kandukur (UR)									
Phase 2	Nellore	Gudur (ST-W)									
Phase 2	Nellore	Kavali (UR)									
Phase 2	Tirupati	Srikalahasti (BC)									

=== Nagara Panchayats ===
Phase	District	Nagara Panchayat	Winner				Runner Up				Margin
Phase	District	Nagara Panchayat	Candidate	Party	Votes	%	Candidate	Party	Votes	%	Margin
Phase	Vizianagaram	Nellimarla (BC)	Lenka Appalanaidu	IND	7,605	49.32	Maipada Prasad	BJP	4,007	25.98	3,598
Phase	Parvathipuram Manyam	Palakonda (BC-W)	Palla Vijaya Nirmala	JSP	10,859	66.44	Palavalasa Indumathi	YSRCP	4,230	25.88	6,629
Phase	Konaseema	Mummidivaram (BC-W)	Gubbala Ganga Ratnabhavani	JSP	8,733	54.60	Sanaboina Suniladevi	YSRCP	6,431	40.21	2,299
Phase	West Godavari	Akividu (UR-W)	Shaik Nilofer	TDP	14,477	73.53	Manne Lalitha Devi	YSRCP	4,720	23.97	9,757
Phase	Palnadu	Dachepalle (UR)	Tangella Srinivasa Rao	TDP	Unanimous						
Phase	Palnadu	Gurazala (UR)	Nelavelli Bollayya	TDP	Unanimous						
Phase	Kadapa	Kamalapuram (UR-W)	G. Swapna Divakar Reddy	TDP	Unanimous						
Phase	Sri Sathya Sai	Madakasira (BC)	Gundumala Sarada	JSP	7,459	55.19	Om Kumar	YSRCP	3,616	26.76	3,843
Phase	Kurnool	Gudur (BC-W)	Damam Sunithabai	BJP	7,797	52.71	Padmavathi	YSRCP	6,334	42.82	1,463
Phase	Nandyal	Bethamcherla (BC)	Dudekula Dasthagiri	YSRCP	12,290	50.02	Lokesh Goud	TDP	10,584	43.08	1,492
Phase 2	Eluru	Chintalapudi (SC-W)									
Phase 2	Markapuram	Podili (SC)									
Phase 2	Nellore	Allur (ST)									
Phase 2	Annamayya	B. Kothakota (BC)									

== See also ==
- Elections in Andhra Pradesh
- 2026 elections in India
- List of urban local bodies in Andhra Pradesh
