= Bhimavaram Municipality =

Local self government in Andhra Pradesh, India

- Formation: 1948
- Merger of: Municipal Corporation
- Type: Governmental organization
- Legal status: Local government
- Purpose: Civic administration
- Headquarters: Bhimavaram
- Location: Bhimavaram, West Godavari district, Andhra Pradesh, India
- Official language: Telugu
- Chairman: Kotikalapudi Govinda Rao
- Municipal Commissioner: B.R.Satyanarayana
- Main organ: Committee

Bhimavaram Municipality is the local self-government in Bhimavaram of the Indian state of Andhra Pradesh. It is classified as a Selection Grade Municipality.

== Administration ==
The municipality was formed in April 1948 as Grade–III municipality. Over the years, it got upgraded and was constituted finally as Special Grade Municipality in September 2011, with the first ever elected council was formed in August 1949.

The municipality is spread over an area of 25.64 km^{2} (9.90 sq mi) and has 39 election wards. each represented by a ward member and the wards committee is headed by a chairperson. The present municipal commissioner of the city is B.R.Satyanarayana and the present chairman is Kotikalapudi Govinda Rao.

Timeline

Date	Classification
April 1948	Grade–III
August 1963	Grade–II
October 1967	Grade–I
April 1980	Special Grade
September 2011	Selection Grade

== Civic infrastructure and services ==
The municipality takes certain measures such as, prevent spreading of diseases, motor pumping of stagnant flood water during heavy rains, improving drainage channels and pipelines etc.

== Awards and achievements ==
The city is one among the 31 cities in the state to be a part of water supply and sewerage services mission known as Atal Mission for Rejuvenation and Urban Transformation (AMRUT). In 2015, as per the Swachh Bharat Abhiyan of the Ministry of Urban Development, Bhimavaram Municipality was ranked 342nd in the country.

== See also ==
- List of municipalities in Andhra Pradesh
