= Atmakur Municipal Council =

Type
- Type: Municipal council of the Atmakur
- Established: 2012; 14 years ago

Leadership
- Chairman: Goparam Venkata Ramanamma
- Deputy Chairman: Shaik Sardar
- Municipal commissioner: M Ramesh Babu
- Seats: 23

Elections
- Voting system: First-past-the-post

Website
- cdma.ap.gov.in/en/Atmakur-municipality

Atmakur Municipal Council is the local self-government in Atmakur, Nellore district, a town in the Indian state of Andhra Pradesh. It is classified as a first grade municipality.

== Jurisdiction ==
The council is spread over an area of 48.39 km^{2} (18.68 sq mi).

== Administration ==
The municipality was constituted on 27 January 2012. It is spread over an area of 58.68 km^{2} (22.66 mi^{2}) and has 23 wards. The Elected Wing of the municipality consists of a municipal council, which has elected members and is headed by a Chairperson. Whereas, the Executive Wing is headed by a municipal commissioner. The present municipal commissioner of the town is M Ramesh Babu.

== List of Municipal Chairmen ==
| No. | Name | Term | Party |
|---|---|---|---|
| 1 | Ragi Vanamma | 2014-2019 | Indian National Congress |
| 2 | Goparam Venkata Ramanamma | 2021-2026 | YSR Congress Party |

== See also ==
- List of municipalities in Andhra Pradesh
