= Chilakaluripet Municipality =

Local self government in Andhra Pradesh, India

- Formation: 1964
- Merger of: Municipal Corporation
- Type: Governmental organization
- Legal status: Local government
- Purpose: Civic administration
- Headquarters: Chilakaluripet
- Location: Chilakaluripet, Guntur district, Andhra Pradesh, India
- Official language: Telugu
- Chairman: SK.Raffani
- Municipal Commissioner: GOVINDA RAO
- Main organ: Committee

Chilakaluripet Municipality is the local self government in Chilakaluripet of the Indian state of Andhra Pradesh. It is classified as a first grade municipality.

== Administration ==
The municipality was constituted in 1964, which covers an area of 18.13 km^{2} (7.00 mi^{2}) and has 34 election wards. The present chairperson of the city is SHAIK RAFANI and the present municipal commissioner is D.RAVINDRA.

== Civic works and services ==
The municipality works on improving civic needs such as, sewerage, storm water drains, solid waste management etc. It also provides the city with water supply to the residents, by means of storage tanks. State government also provide funds for the developmental activities of the municipality.

Projects

Chilakaluripet is one of the seven municipalities, along with Vijayawada and Guntur Municipal Corporations to be a part of a 15 MW waste-to-energy plant project. It is planned to be set up with the collaboration of the JITF Urban Infrastructure Limited.

== Awards and achievements ==
The city is one among the 31 cities in the state to be a part of water supply and sewerage services mission known as Atal Mission for Rejuvenation and Urban Transformation (AMRUT). In 2015, as per the Swachh Bharat Abhiyan of the Ministry of Urban Development, Chilakaluripet Municipality was ranked 187th in the country.

== See also ==
- List of municipalities in Andhra Pradesh
