= Ichhapur (disambiguation) =

Ichapore, or Ichhapur (archaic spelling Ishapore), is a neighbourhood in North Barrackpur municipality in Barrackpore subdivision, North 24 Parganas district, West Bengal, India

Ichhapur, Ichapore or Ishapore, may also refer to the following:

- Ichhapur railway station, in Ichapore
- Rifle Factory Ishapore, arms manufacturing unit in Ichapore
  - Ishapore 2A1 rifle, bolt-action rifle
  - Ishapore 1A1, battle rifle
- Ichhapur Defence Estate, a census town in Barrackpore I CD Block in Barrackpore subdivision, North 24 Parganas district, West Bengal, India
- Ichhapur, Paschim Bardhaman, a census town in Durgapur subdivision, Paschim Bardhaman district, West Bengal, India

== See also ==
- Ichhapuran, a 1970 Indian Bengali-language film
- Ichchapuram, a town in Andhra Pradesh, India
  - Ichchapuram Assembly constituency, Andhra Pradesh Legislative Assembly
  - Ichchapuram railway station
  - Ichchapuram Municipality, municipal corporation of the town
