= Adoni Municipality =

Local self-government in Adoni, India

- Formation: 1865
- Merger of: Municipal Corporation
- Type: Governmental organisation
- Legal status: Local government
- Purpose: Civic administration
- Headquarters: Adoni
- Location: Adoni, Kurnool district, Andhra Pradesh, India
- Coordinates: 15°37′17″N 77°16′26″E
- Official language: Telugu
- Chairman: Kuruba Sarojamma
- Municipal Commissioner: B.sreekanth
- Website: https://adoni.cdma.ap.gov.in/

Adoni Municipality is the local self-government in Adoni, a city in the Indian state of Andhra Pradesh. It is classified as a special grade municipality.

== Administration ==
The municipality was formed in the year 1865. It is spread over an area of 37.12 km^{2} (14.33 mi^{2}) and has 41 municipal wards. The Elected Wing of the municipality consists of a municipal council, which has elected members and is headed by a Chairman. Whereas, the Executive Wing is headed by a municipal commissioner. The present municipal commissioner of the city is B.Sreekanth and the chairperson is Kuruba Sarojamma.

The municipality has approximately, 32,856–33,071 households. In 2013–14, the total income generated by the municipality was ₹ 15.808 crore and the expenditure spent was ₹ 13.0373 crore.

== Awards and achievements ==
The city is one among the 31 cities in the state to be a part of water supply and sewerage services mission known as Atal Mission for Rejuvenation and Urban Transformation (AMRUT). In 2015, as per the Swachh Bharat Abhiyan of the Ministry of Urban Development, Adoni Municipality was ranked 148th in the country.

== See also ==
- List of municipalities in Andhra Pradesh
