= Atmakur =

Atmakur or Athmakur may refer to the following places in India:

== Andhra Pradesh ==
- Atmakur mandal, Anantapur district
- Atmakur, Anantapur district, a village in Anantapur district
- Atmakur, Durgi, Guntur district, a village in Durgi mandal, Guntur district
- Atmakur, Nandyal district, a town
- Atmakur, Nellore district, a city
  - Atmakur mandal, subdistrict
  - Atmakur revenue division, Nellore district
  - Atmakur Assembly constituency, an assembly constituency of Nellore district
- Atmakur, Mangalagiri, Guntur district, village in Mangalagiri mandal

== Telangana ==
- Atmakur, Medak district, a village
- Atmakur, Hanamkonda district, a village
- Atmakur (M), Yadadri Bhuvanagiri district, a village
- Atmakur, Wanaparthy, a town
