= Narasaraopet Municipality =

Local government in Andhra Pradesh, India

- Formation: 1915
- Merger of: Municipal Corporation
- Type: Governmental organization
- Legal status: Local government
- Purpose: Civic administration
- Headquarters: Narasaraopet
- Location: Narasaraopet, Palnadu district, Andhra Pradesh, India
- Official language: Telugu
- Chairman: Vacant
- Main organ: Committee

Narasaraopet Municipality is the local self government in Narasaraopet of the Indian state of Andhra Pradesh. It is classified as a Selection Grade Municipality.

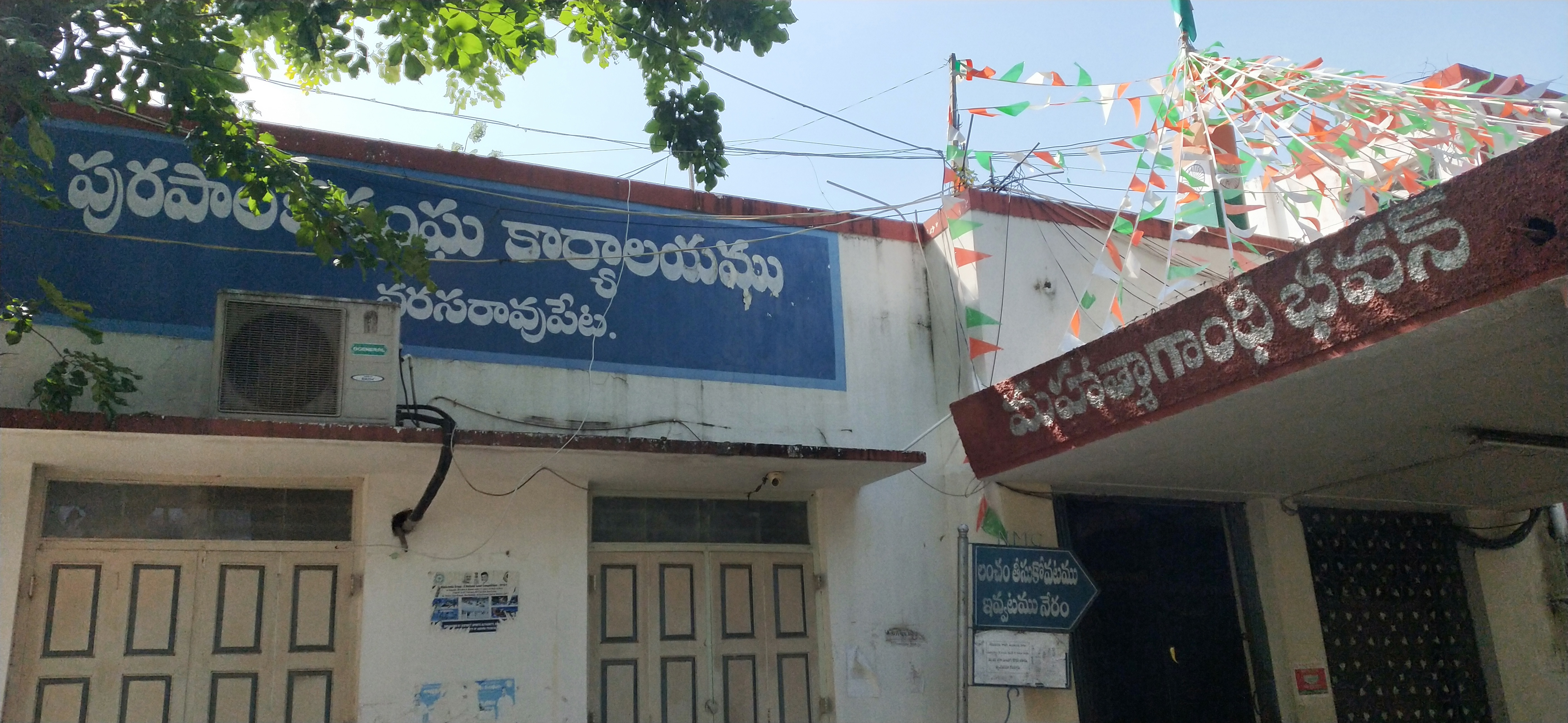
Narasaraopet municipal office

== History ==
The municipality is as old as a century, with its formation dating back to 18 May 1915. It got upgraded to first grade municipality on 28 April 1980 and Promoted to Selection Grade Municipality on 29 May 2025.

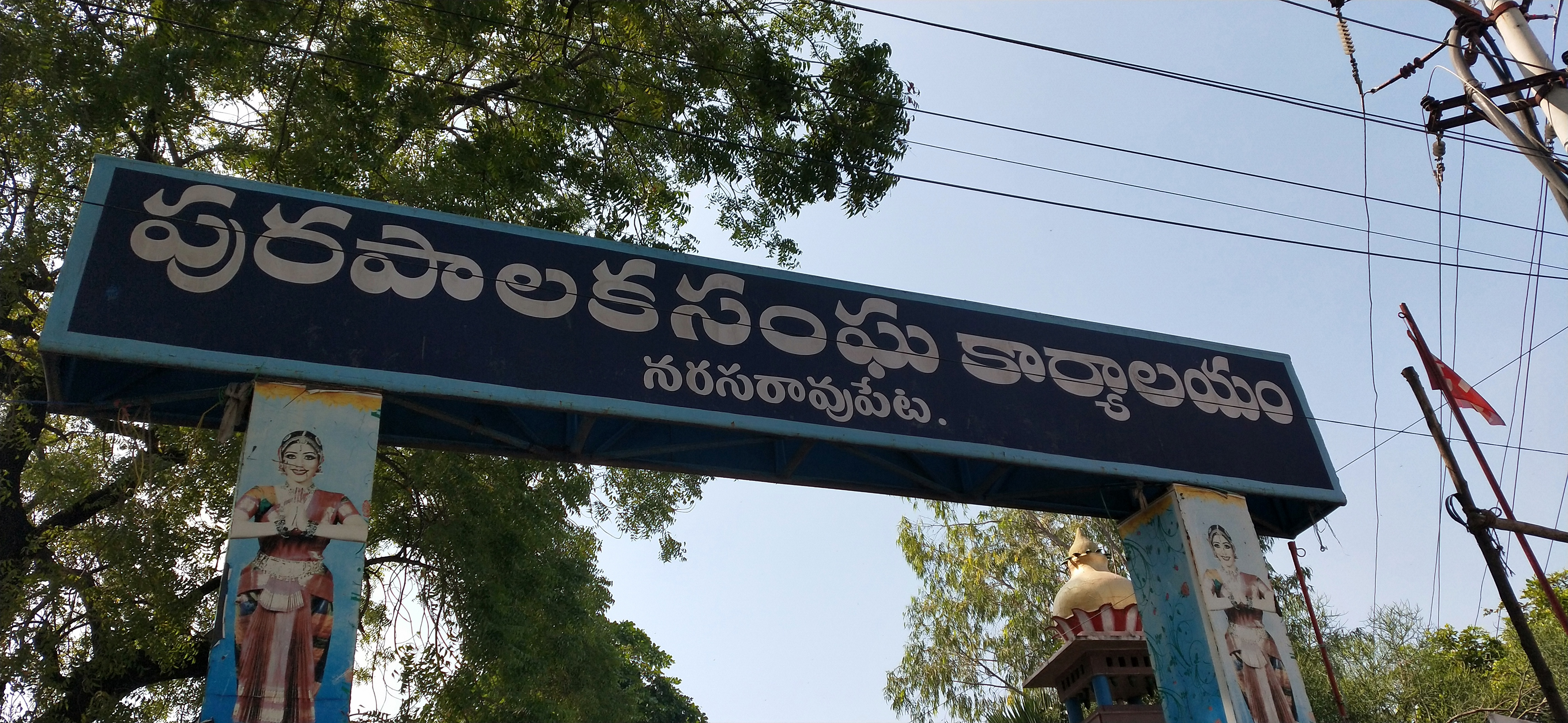
Narasaraopet municipal office exterior

Timeline

Date	Classification
18 May 1915	Formation
28 April 1980	Grade–I
29 May 2025	Selection Grade

== Administration ==
The municipality is spread over an area of 7.65 km^{2} (2.95 sq mi) and has 34 election wards. Narasaraopet municipality is also a part of Narasaraopet urban agglomeration.

The Elected Wing of the municipality consists of a municipal council, which has elected members and is headed by a Chairperson. Whereas, the Executive Wing is headed by a municipal commissioner. The present municipal commissioner of the city is J.Siva Ram Krishna and the present chairman is N.Subbaraya Guptha.

== Civic works and services ==
The municipality oversees works such as, road widening, underground drainage, street lights, public and private toilets etc., and also a forefront in implementing the Swachh Bharat Abhiyan. Construction of houses for poor, providing cooking gas connections etc., are also some of the other initiatives of the municipality.

Projects

Narasaraopet is one of the seven municipalities, along with Vijayawada and Guntur Municipal Corporations to be a part of a 15 MW waste-to-energy plant project. It is planned to be set up with the collaboration of the JITF Urban Infrastructure Limited.

== Awards and achievements ==
The municipality completed its centenary fete, as it completed hundred years of its formation. The city is one among the 31 cities in the state to be a part of water supply and sewerage services mission known as Atal Mission for Rejuvenation and Urban Transformation (AMRUT). In 2015, as per the Swachh Bharat Abhiyan of the Ministry of Urban Development, Narasaraopet Municipality was ranked 59th in the country.

== See also ==
- List of municipalities in Andhra Pradesh
