= Jarugu Narasimha Moorthy =

Indian organic photochemist

- Born: 1964 (age 61–62); B. Kothakota, Chittoor district, Andhra Pradesh, India
- Education: Bangalore University; Indian Institute of Science; University of Houston; University of Würzburg; University of Victoria
- Known for: Studies on organic photochemistry, supramolecular chemistry, organic materials and mechanistic organic chemistry
- Awards: 2003 CRSI Young Chemist Award; 2008 Shanti Swarup Bhatnagar Prize; 2009 CRSI Bronze Medal; 2016 ISCA Millennium Plaque of Honor
- Scientific career
- Fields: Physical organic chemistry
- Workplaces: Indian Institute of Technology, Kharagpur; IIT Kanpur; IISER Thiruvananthapuram; University of Bremen; Jacobs University Bremen; University of Strasburg; Osaka University
- Doctoral advisor: Jay Kochi; Waldemar Adam; Cornelia Bohne

Jarugu Narasimha Moorthy (born 1964) is an Indian organic photochemist and former Director of Indian Institute of Science Education and Research, Thiruvananthapuram. He was a Dr. Jag Mohan Garg Chair Professor at the Indian Institute of Technology, Kanpur. He is known for his studies on organic photochemistry and supramolecular chemistry. He is an elected fellow of the Royal Society of Chemistry and the Indian Academy of Sciences. The Council of Scientific and Industrial Research, the apex agency of the Government of India for scientific research, awarded him the Shanti Swarup Bhatnagar Prize for Science and Technology, one of the highest Indian science awards, in 2008, for his contributions to chemical sciences.

== Biography ==
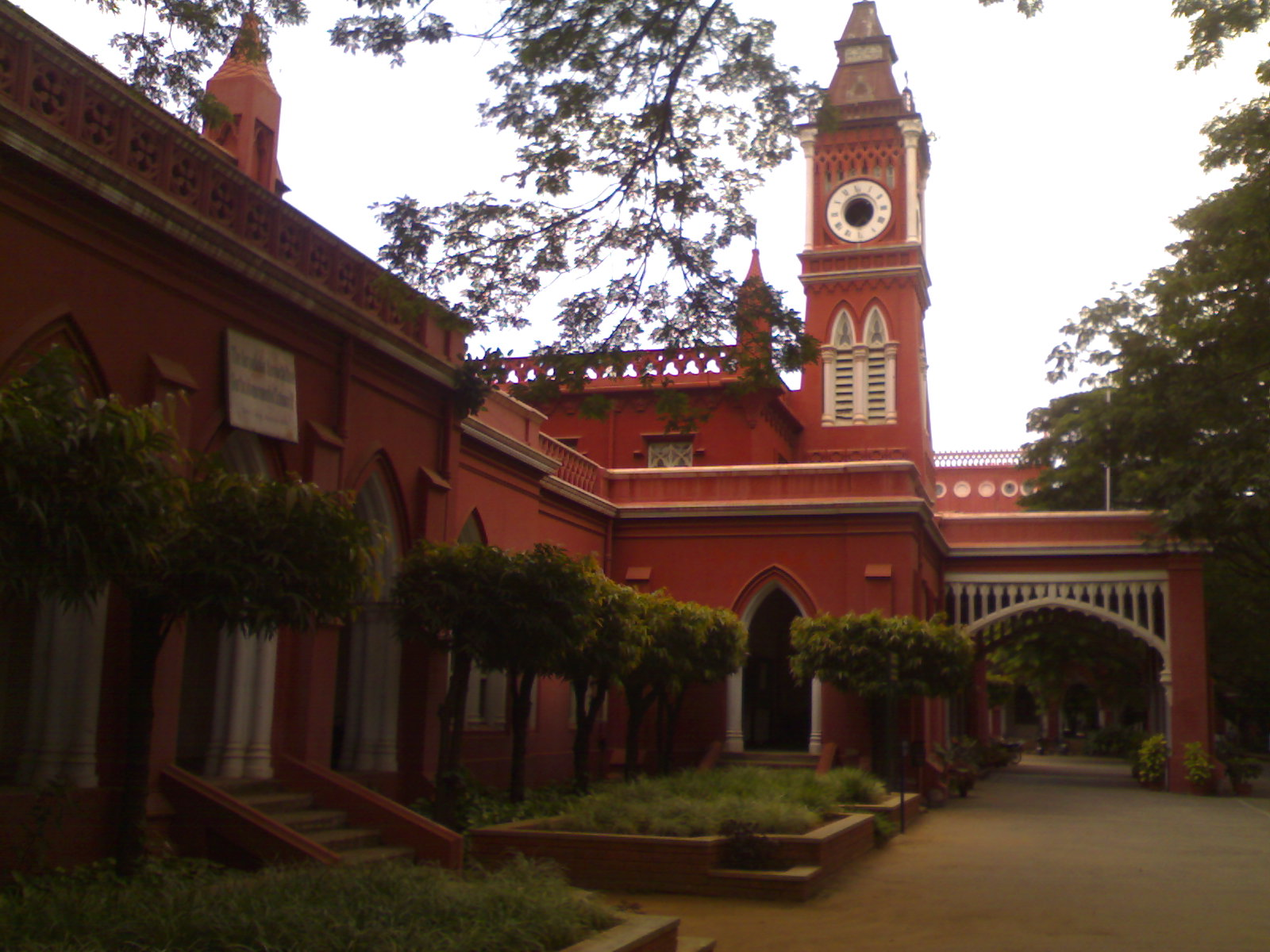
Bangalore University

J. N. Moorthy, Born in B. Kothakota, a border town in Chittoor district of the south Indian state of Andhra Pradesh, graduated in chemistry from Bangalore University in 1985 and completed his master's degree from the same university in 1988. Subsequently, he joined the Indian Institute of Science from where he secured his Phd, under the supervision of Prof. K. Venkatesan, in 1994 and went to the US to pursue his post-doctoral studies under the guidance of Jay Kochi of the University of Houston. In 1995, after obtaining an Alexander von Humboldt fellowship, he moved to the laboratory of Waldemar Adam at the University of Würzburg where he stayed for one and half years. He subsequently moved to the University of Victoria in 1996 to work with Cornelia Bohne. In 1998, he returned to India to join the Indian Institute of Technology, Kharagpur in June 1998 as an assistant professor but stayed there only for a few months and relocated to the Indian Institute of Technology, Kanpur where he served as an associate professor from December 2003 before becoming a professor of the department of chemistry in 2008. After holding the Lalit M. Kapoor Chair Professorship during 2011–14, he also served as the Dr. Jag Mohan Garg Chair Professor at the institute. In between, he has had various stints abroad as a visiting professor at institutions such as University of Bremen (Alexander von Humboldt fellow 2004-05), Jacobs University Bremen (Royal Society of Chemistry grants 2007), University of Strasburg (2010) and Osaka University (2010). On 1 April 2019, Professor J. N. Moorthy was appointed the Director of the Indian Institute of Science Education and Research, Thiruvananthapuram (IISER-Thiruvananthapuram), where he served till 8 July 2026.

== Legacy ==
Moorthy received the junior and senior research fellowships (1989–93) of the Council of Scientific and Industrial Research, offered in association with the University Grants Commission of India and his research have been focused on the organization of organic molecules and their photoreactivity. His contributions encompass several themes that fall into the broad ambit of ‘physical organic chemistry’. The thesis of his research has been ‘structure is an embodiment of reactivity and self-assembly’. With a diligent design of molecules and by exploiting sterics rationally, he has demonstrated control of both thermal and photochemical reactivity. He has documented his researches in several peer-reviewed articles; ResearchGate and Google Scholar, two online repositories of scientific articles have listed >180 of them. He was on the editorial board of the International Journal of Photoenergy from 2012 to 2015 and was also been associated with the New Journal of Chemistry of the Royal Society of Chemistry as a member of its editorial board from 2011 to 2013.

== Awards and honors ==
Moorthy received the Young Chemist Award of the Chemical Research Society of India (CRSI) in 2003; CRSI honoured him again with the Bronze Medal in 2009. In between, the Council of Scientific and Industrial Research awarded him the Shanti Swarup Bhatnagar Prize, one of the highest Indian science awards, in 2008. He was elected as a fellow by the Indian Academy of Sciences in 2010, Indian National Science Academy in 2018 and by the Royal Society of Chemistry in 2014. The Indian Science Congress Association selected him for the Millennium Plaque of Honor in 2016. He has held several research fellowships including the Alexander von Humboldt Fellowship (1995–96) and the Ramanna Fellowship (2007–10), International Centre of Trans-Disciplinary Studies (CIRET) fellowship (2008) and J. C. Bose National Fellowship of the Department of Science and Technology (2015-2025).

== See also ==
- K. Venkatesan
