= Palakollu Municipality =

Palakollu Municipal Council
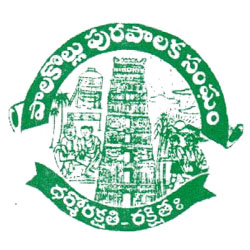

Type
- Type: Municipal Council (India)

History
- Founded: 1 April 1919

Leadership
- Chairman: Vallabhu Narayana Murthy (TDP)
- Vice Chairman: Karineni Roja Ramani (TDP)
- Municipal commissioner: Buddha Rama Satya Seshadri

Structure
- Seats: 31
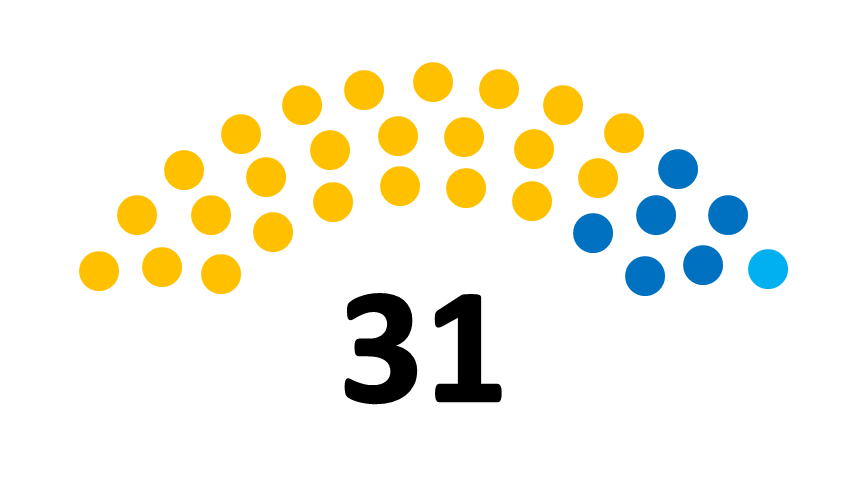
- Political groups: TDP (24); YSRCP (6); INC (1)

Motto
- Dharmo Rakshathi Rakshithaha

Meeting place
- PMC building

Website
- palakol.cdma.ap.gov.in

Palakollu Municipality is the local self-government in Palakollu of the Indian state of Andhra Pradesh. Palakollu Municipality merged five Grama panchayats of Seven village's (Kontheru, Adavipalem, Palakollu Rural, Bhaggeswaram, Poolapalli, Varidhanam And Ullamparru) on dated 7 January 2020. the Seven Village's population of 42,932 (as 2011 Census) It around occupies 20.08 square kilometres (7.75 sq mi) and after merged palakollu municipality It around occupies 24.68 square kilometres (9.53 sq mi) with 35 election wards it is total population of 1,04,216 (as 2011 Census) and making it the fourth most populous city in West Godavari District in Andhra Pradesh. It is classified as a Selection Grade Municipality.

1 January 2019, under Andhra Pradesh Metropolitan Region and Urban Development Authority Act, 2016, Palakollu Municipality became a part of Eluru Urban Development Authority.

== Administration ==
The municipality was formed in April 1919 as a Grade–III municipality. Over the years, it was upgraded and was constituted finally as a First Grade Municipality in September 1965. The first ever elected council was formed in August 1919.

The municipality is spread over an area of 19.49 km^{2} (7.53 sq mi) and has 31 election wards. Each is represented by a ward member and the wards committee is headed by a chairperson. The present municipal commissioner of the city is Sri Buddha Rama Satya Seshadri.

Timeline

| Date | Classification |
|---|---|
| April 1919 | Grade–III |
| August 1965 | Grade–I |
| 1 January 2019 | Part of EUDA |
| 7 January 2020 | Selection Grade |

== Civic infrastructure and services ==
The municipality takes certain measures such as prevent spreading of diseases, motor pumping of stagnant flood water during heavy rains, and improving drainage channels and pipelines.

== Responsibilities ==
PMC is responsible for administering and providing basic infrastructure to the city.

- Building and maintenance of roads, streets and flyovers
- Public municipal schools
- Street lighting
- Maintenance of parks and open spaces
- Garbage disposal and street cleanliness
- Urban development and city planning of new areas
- Registering of births and deaths
- Health and sanitation

PMC co-ordinates with various other government organizations like EUDA, APSRTC and Palakollu Traffic Police, to deliver these basic urban services.

== Palakollu municipal election 2014 ==
| S.no. | Party | Flag | Alliance | Number of councilors | Change |
|---|---|---|---|---|---|
| 01 | Telugu Desam Party (TDP) | | - | 24 | ▲85 |
| 02 | YSR Congress Party (YSRCP) | | - | 06 | ▲10 |
| 03 | Indian National Congress (INC) | | UPA | 01 | ▼99 |

== Awards and achievements ==
In 2018, as per the Swachh Bharat Mission of the Ministry of Urban Development, Under Swachh Survekshan - 2018 Palakollu Municipality was ranked 43rd in the South Zone out of 1113 with Zonal average marks 1438.96 and state rank 20th out of 79 with state average marks 1916.2 Palakollu ULB Census Coad 802966.

== See also ==
- List of municipalities in Andhra Pradesh
