= Tanuku bus station =

Bus station in Andhra Pradesh, India

Tanuku Town Bus Station

General information
- Location: Tanuku, West Godavari district, Andhra Pradesh; India
- Owner: Government of India
- Operator: APSRTC

Construction
- Structure type: Standard (On ground)
- Parking: Yes

Other information
- Station code: TNK
- Fare zone: WestZone
- Website: www.apsrtc.com

Tanuku Town bus station is a bus station located in the Tanuku Town in the Indian state of Andhra Pradesh. It is owned and operated by Andhra Pradesh State Road Transport Corporation. The station is also equipped with a bus depot for storage and maintenance of buses. It operates buses to all parts of the district and also to the nearby cities like Eluru, Vijayawada, Rajahmundry and Tadepalligudem.
