= Anantapur Municipal Corporation =

Local civic body in Anantapur, Andhra Pradesh, India

Anantapuram Municipal Corporation Anantapuramu nagara pālaka Sanstha అనంతపురము నగర పాలక సంస్థ
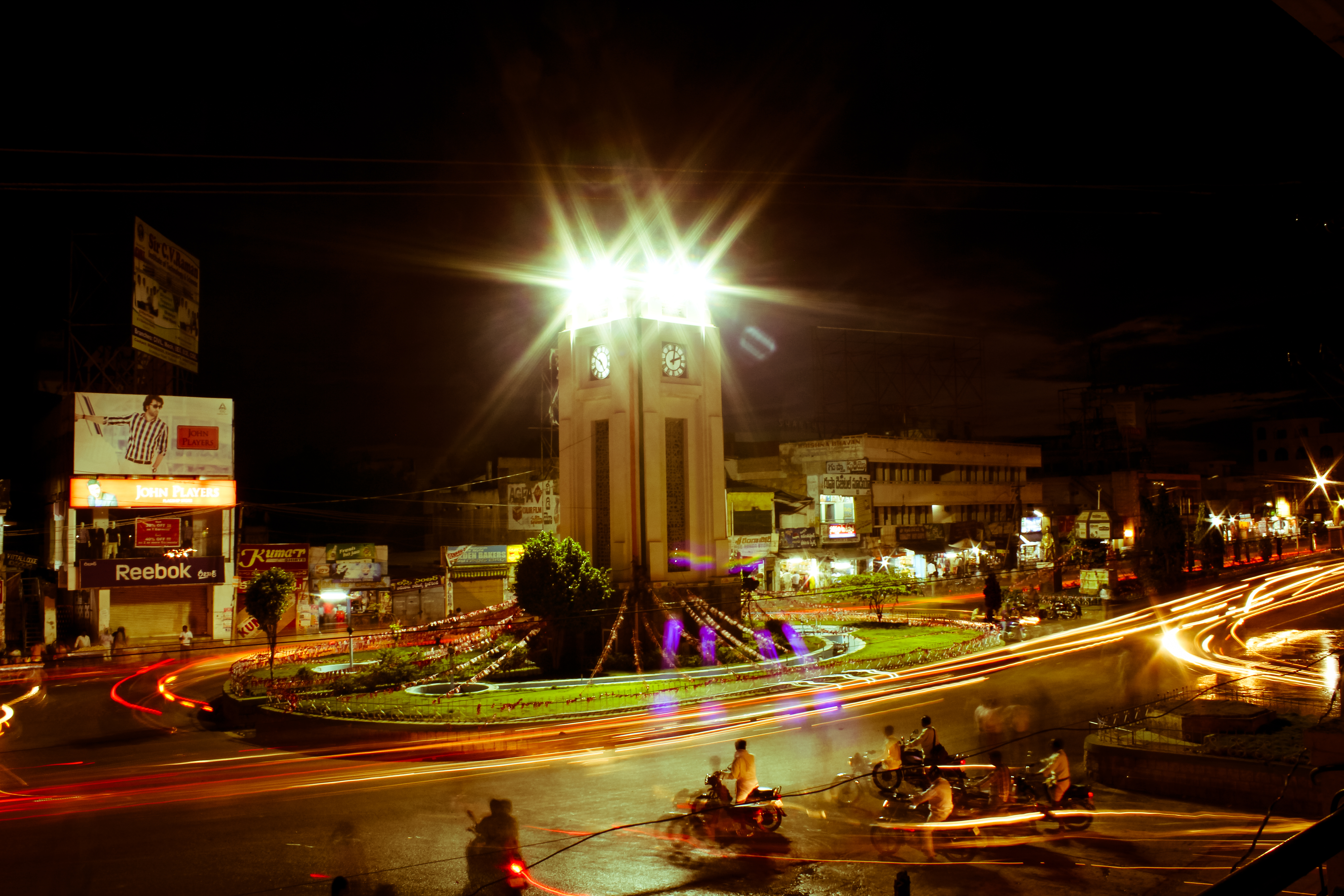

Type
- Type: Municipal Corporation of the Anantapur

History
- Founded: 2006

Leadership
- Mayor: B.C. Ramesh Goud, YSRCP since 3 November 2026
- Deputy Mayor: TBA, YSRCP since 3 November 2026
- Corporation Commissioner: Gowthami, M.I.A.S

Structure
- Seats: 62
- Political groups: Government (21): YSRCP (21); Opposition (41) Kutami (37): TDP (30); JSP (6); BJP (1); Other (4): IND (4)

Elections
- Last election: 1 November 2026
- Next election: 2031

Meeting place
- Anantapur, Andhra Pradesh

Website
- Anantapur Municipal Corporation

Anantapur Municipal Corporation, officially Anantapuramu Municipal Corporation, is a civic body of Anantapuram in the Indian state of Andhra Pradesh. It was constituted as a municipality in the year 1869 and upgraded to corporation in the year 1950. In 2004 Anantapur Municipality is upgraded to Anantapuram Municipal Corporation. Municipal Corporation mechanism in India was introduced during British Rule with formation of municipal corporation in Madras (Chennai) in 1688, later followed by municipal corporations in Bombay (Mumbai) and Calcutta (Kolkata) by 1762. Anantapur Municipal Corporation is headed by Mayor of city and governed by Commissioner.

== Jurisdiction ==
The corporation is spread over an area of 15.98 km^{2} (6.17 sq mi) with 50 election wards.

== List of Mayors ==
Anantapur Municipal Corporation (AMC)
No.	Mayor	Deputy Mayor	Term start	Term end	Party
1.	R. Parshuram	Bandi Sreeramulu	2005	2010	Indian National Congress
2.	M. Swaroopa	S. Gampanna	2015	2020	Telugu Desam Party
3.	Waseem Saleem	V. Sahithya; K. Vijaybhaskarreddy	2021	2026	YSR Congress Party
4.	B.C. Ramesh Goud	TBA	2026	2031	YSR Congress Party

=== 2021 elections ===
S.No.	Party name	Symbol	Won	Change
1	YSR Congress Party		48	Steady
2	Independents		2	Steady

== Administration ==
The corporation is administered by an elected body, headed by the mayor. The present commissioner of the corporation is Smt.Gowthami.M.I.A.S and the mayor is Mohammed Waseem Saleem.

== Functions ==
Anantapur Municipal Corporation is created for the following functions:

- Planning for the town including its surroundings which are covered under its Department's Urban Planning Authority .
- Approving construction of new buildings and authorising use of land for various purposes.
- Improvement of the town's economic and Social status.
- Arrangements of water supply towards commercial, residential and industrial purposes.
- Planning for fire contingencies through Fire Service Departments.
- Creation of solid waste management, public health system and sanitary services.
- Working for the development of ecological aspect like development of Urban Forestry and making guidelines for environmental protection.
- Working for the development of weaker sections of the society like mentally and physically handicapped, old age and gender biased people.
- Making efforts for improvement of slums and poverty removal in the town.

== Revenue sources ==
The following are the Income sources for the Corporation from the Central and State Government.

=== Revenue from taxes ===
Following is the Tax related revenue for the corporation.

- Property tax.
- Profession tax.
- Entertainment tax.
- Grants from Central and State Government like Goods and Services Tax.
- Advertisement tax.

=== Revenue from non-tax sources ===
Following is the Non Tax related revenue for the corporation.

- Water usage charges.
- Fees from Documentation services.
- Rent received from municipal property.
- Funds from municipal bonds.

== See also ==
- List of municipal corporations in India
