= Gudivada Municipality =

- Gudivada Municipality Office (old building)
- Formation: 1937
- Type: Governmental organisation
- Purpose: Civic Administration
- Headquarters: Gudivada
- Location: Gudivada, Krishna district, Andhra Pradesh, India
- Official language: Telugu
- Municipal Commissioner: S Manohar

Gudivada Municipality is the local self government in Gudivada of the Indian state of Andhra Pradesh. It is classified as a special grade municipality, spread over an area of 12.67 km^{2} (4.89 sq mi) with 48 election wards.

== History ==
The municipality was constituted in the year 1927.

== Governance ==
The municipality consists of a chairperson and its wards committee. YSR Congress Party won the Gudivada municipal elections in 2014. Vacant is the present chairman of the municipality and the vice-chairman is Vacant. The present municipal commissioner is S Manohar.

== Civic infrastructure and services ==
The city residents rely on hand pumps and motors for water. The shortage of water made the municipality to take certain measures like, providing new pipelines, construction of two summer storage tanks with a capacity of 1,686 million litres and 634 million litres etc. The municipality provides 87 litres of water per head every day. The other works such as, sewage, internal drainage system and road margins are also taken by the authorities.

Sri Kodali Venkateswara Rao (Nani) Park (or Rajendra Nagar Park) was constructed by the Public Works Department in 2005 and is maintained by the municipality.

== Awards and achievements ==
The city is one among the 31 cities in the state to be a part of water supply and sewerage services mission known as Atal Mission for Rejuvenation and Urban Transformation (AMRUT). In 2015, as per the Swachh Bharat Abhiyan of the Ministry of Urban Development, Gudivada Municipality was ranked 450th in the country.
