= Chirala Municipality =

Local self-government in India

- Formation: 1948
- Merger of: Municipal Corporation
- Type: Governmental organisation
- Legal status: Local government
- Purpose: Civic administration
- Headquarters: Chirala
- Location: Chirala, Prakasam district, Andhra Pradesh, India
- Official language: Telugu
- Municipal Commissioner: Ch.Malleswara Rao

Chirala Municipality is the local self-government in Chirala, a city in the Indian state of Andhra Pradesh. It is classified as a first grade municipality.

== Administration ==
The municipality was constituted on 1 April 1948. It is spread over an area of 13.30 km^{2} (5.14 mi^{2}) and has 33 wards. The Elected Wing of the municipality consists of a municipal council, which has elected members and is headed by a Chairperson. Whereas, the Executive Wing is headed by a municipal commissioner. The present municipal commissioner of the city is Ch.Malleswara Rao

== Civic works and services ==
Most of the city residents rely on public taps for water. A total of 6 MLD (million liters per day) of drinking water is supplied every day. There are 136.50 km (84.82 mi) of roads and 134.40 km (83.51 mi) of drains and 30.00 km (18.64 mi) of storm water drains.

The infrastructure maintained by the municipality covers, street lights, public markets, shopping complexes and community halls etc., and recreational areas like, public parks, playgrounds etc. There are educational institutions like elementary and secondary schools imparting for primary and secondary. including junior colleges. For public health, the municipality has dispensaries, maternity and child health centers.

== See also ==
- List of municipalities in Andhra Pradesh
