= Parvathipuram Municipality =

- Formation: 1959
- Type: Governmental organisation
- Legal status: Local government
- Headquarters: Parvathipuram
- Location: Parvathipuram, Vizianagaram district, Andhra Pradesh, India
- Official language: Telugu
- Municipal Commissioner: PVVD Prasada Rao

Parvathipuram Municipality is the local self-government in Parvathipuram, a city in the Indian state of Andhra Pradesh. It is classified as a First grade municipality.

== Administration ==
The municipality was constituted in 1959 and is spread over an area of 11.24 km^{2} (4.34 mi^{2}) with 30 election wards. The present municipal commissioner of the town is D.Narasinga Rao.

== See also ==
- List of municipalities in Andhra Pradesh
