= Tanuku Municipality =

Tanuku Town Municipality Tanuku Municipal Commissioner = N Vasu babu
- Tarakapuri
- Formation: 1979
- Merger of: Municipal Corporation
- Type: Governmental organisation
- Legal status: Local government
- Headquarters: Tanuku
- Location: West Godavari district, Andhra Pradesh, India
- Official language: Telugu

Tanuku Municipality is the local self government in Tanuku, a Town in the Indian state of Andhra Pradesh. It is classified as a first grade municipality.

== History ==
Mullapudi Harischandra Prasad was the first chairman of Tanuku. After So Many Municipal Chairman'S Of Tanuku Was Going Generation. Tanuku Town Municipality.

Last Term Municipal Chairman Was

( Parimi Venkatesulu )

Son/Of ( Parimi Krupavaram)

== Administration ==
The municipality was constituted in 1979 and the urban local body is classified as a first grade municipality. The jurisdictional area of the municipality is spread over an area of 24.83 km^{2} (9.59 mi^{2}), with 34 municipal wards. The present municipal commissioner of the city is Mr.Gorantla Sambasiva Rao and the chairperson is SS REDDY GARU.

Tanuku Municipal Chairman - Ss Reddy Ysrcp

== Civic works and services ==
Tanuku is one of the municipality to be a part of energy conservation project, in coordination with Energy Efficiency Services Limited (EESL), under Union Ministry of Power.

== See also ==
- List of municipalities in Andhra Pradesh
