= Chilakaluripet =

Chilakaluripet Chilakaluripeta
- Town
- Location in Andhra Pradesh, India
- Coordinates: 16.08917°N 80.16722°E
- Country: India
- State: Andhra Pradesh
- District: Palnadu

Area
  - Total: 15 km^{2} (5.8 sq mi)
- Elevation: 25 m (82 ft)

Population (2011)
  - Total: 150,000
  - Density: 10,000/km^{2} (26,000/sq mi)

Languages
  - Official: Telugu
- Time zone: UTC+5:30 (IST)
- PIN: 522 616
- Vehicle registration: AP-07
- Website: chilakaluripet.cdma.ap.gov.in/en

Chilakaluripet, natively known as Chilakaluripeta, is a town in Palnadu district of the Indian state of Andhra Pradesh. It is the Mandal headquarters of Chilakaluripet Mandal in Narasaraopet Revenue Division.

== Geography ==
It is located in the Coastal Andhra region of the state at 16.10°N 80.16°E on the Eastern coastal plains. Chilakaluripeta is located 27 km (17 mi) south-east of the district headquarters Palnadu district, and 75 kilometres (46 mi) south-west of Amaravati (state capital). The Town is located in zone 3 as per Earthquake zones of India. Krishna River water from the Nagarjuna Sagar Right Canal is the main source of water for the residents.

== Demographics ==
As of 2011 Census of India, the town had a population of 101,550. The total population constitute, 50,201 males and 51,349 females. Average sex ratio is 1023 females per 1000 males, higher than the national average of 940 per 1000. 9,525 children are in the age group of 0–6 years, of which 4,916 are boys and 4,609 are girls with a sex ratio of 938 per 1000. The average literacy rate stands at 72.08% with 52,106 literates, lower than the national average of 73.00%.

== Civic administration ==
Chilakaluripet Municipality was constituted in 1964 as a third grade municipality, It was upgraded to second grade in 1980 and to first grade in 2001. The jurisdiction of the municipality is spread over an area of 18.13 km (11.27 mi) with 38 wards.

== Politics ==
Chilakaluripet is a part of Chilakaluripet (Assembly constituency) for Andhra Pradesh Legislative Assembly. Prathipati Pulla Rao is the present MLA of the constituency from TDP. It comes under Narasaraopet (Lok Sabha constituency) which was won by Lavu Srikrishna Devarayala of TDP Party.

== Economy ==
Chilakaluripet is a part of Vijayawada–Chilakaluripet growth corridor. The municipality, along with Vijayawada and Guntur Municipal Corporations are a part of a 15 MW waste-to-energy plant project, planned to be set up with the collaboration of the JITF Urban Infrastructure Limited.

== Transport ==
The town has no rail network and mostly depends on road connectivity. The nearby railway stations are Guntur Jn Railway Station (40 km), Narasaraopet Railway station (21 km), Satuluru Railway station (25 km) and Chirala Railway station (40 km). National Highway 16 (India), a part of Golden Quadrilateral, passes through the city. It has a total NH16 length of in the City 5 km (3.1 mi), and total length of Roads in the City 116.20 km (72.20 mi) APSRTC operates buses from Chilakaluripet bus station. The National Highway 16, which connects Metropolitan cities Kolkata and Chennai. A part of Golden Quadrilateral highway network, an intersecting part of the Asian Highway 45, and State Highway 45 from Piduguralla to Chirala passes through the city.

== Education ==
The primary and secondary school education is imparted by government, aided and private schools, under the School Education Department of the state. A Private English Medium School which was established long back at Chilakaluripet, Guntur in Andhra Pradesh, Recognised by Government of Andhra Pradesh. Chilakaluripeta is surrounded by many Degree, PG, Pharmacy And Engineering Colleges, Sadineni Chowdaraiah College of Arts Science PG Center (Maddirala), Modern Degree College (Modern Educational Institutions), DRNSCVS Degree College, AMG Degree College, Nikhila Degree College, Sharada College of Pharmaceutical Sciences (Kotappakonda), CR Engineering College (Ganapavaram).

== See also ==
- List of cities in Andhra Pradesh
