= List of AMRUT Smart cities in Tamil Nadu =

Atal Mission for Rejuvenation and Urban Transformation (AMRUT) is a program undertaken by Ministry of Housing and Urban Affairs of Government of India. The scheme was launched on 25 June 2015 and aims to develop infrastructure in important cities and municipalities across the country. In Tamil Nadu, infrastructure development work under various categories such as water supply, underground drainage systems, public health facilities and transportation services are undertaken in the identified cities under the scheme.

For the year 2024 and 2025, the state government is planning to undertake the development works of 40 towns along with the listed cities.

== List of cities and municipalities ==
33 cities and towns in Tamil Nadu have been listed under the scheme:

| City | District |
|---|---|
| Alandur | Chennai |
| Ambattur | Chennai |
| Ambur | Tirupathur |
| Avadi | Thiruvallur |
| Chennai | Chennai |
| Coimbatore | Coimbatore |
| Cuddalore | Cuddalore |
| Dindigul | Dindigul |
| Erode | Erode |
| Hosur | Krishnagiri |
| Kancheepuram | Kancheepuram |
| Karaikudi | Sivaganga |
| Kumbakonam | Thanjavur |
| Kurichi | Coimbatore |
| Madavaram | Chennai |
| Madurai | Madurai |
| Nagapattinam | Nagapattinam |
| Nagercoil | Kanniyakumari |
| Pallavaram | Chengalpattu |
| Pudukkottai | Pudukkottai |
| Rajapalayam | Virudhunagar |
| Rameshwaram | Ramanathapuram |
| Salem | Salem |
| Tambaram | Chengalpattu |
| Thanjavur | Thanjavur |
| Thoothukkudi | Thoothukkudi |
| Tiruchirappalli | Tiruchirappalli |
| Tirunelveli | Tirunelveli |
| Tiruppur | Tiruppur |
| Tiruvannamalai | Tiruvannamalai |
| Tiruvottiyur | Chennai |
| Velankanni | Nagapattinam |
| Vellore | Vellore |
