= Dachepalle Nagar Panchayat =

Local self-government in Dachepalle, Andhra Pradesh

Dachepalle Nagar panchayat

Type
- Type: Nagar panchayat of the Dachepalle
- Established: 2020; 6 years ago

Elections
- Voting system: First-past-the-post
- Last election: 2014
- Next election: 2026

Website
- cdma.ap.gov.in/en/kavali-municipality

Dachepalle is the local self-government in Dachepalle, a town in the Indian state of Andhra Pradesh. It is classified as a first grade municipality.

Dachepalle Nagar Panchayat is one of the nagar panchayats in SPSR Palnadu district.

== History ==
It was created in 2020. It has 20 wards.

== Jurisdiction ==
The council is spread over an area of 48.39 km^{2} (18.68 sq mi).

== Administration ==
The municipality was constituted on 1 April 1967. It is spread over an area of 60.09 km^{2} (23.20 mi^{2}) and has 40 wards. The Elected Wing of the municipality consists of a municipal council, which has elected members and is headed by a Chairperson. Whereas, the Executive Wing is headed by a municipal commissioner. The present municipal commissioner of the town is B.Siva Reddy.

== See also ==
- List of Nagar Panchayats in Andhra Pradesh
