= Eluru Urban Development Authority =

Agency overview
- Formed: 1 January 2019
- Type: Urban Planning Agency
- Jurisdiction: Government of Andhra Pradesh
- Headquarters: Eluru, Eluru district, Andhra Pradesh

The Eluru Urban Development Authority (EUDA) is an urban planning agency in Eluru district of the Indian state of Andhra Pradesh. It was constituted on 1 January 2019, under Andhra Pradesh Metropolitan Region and Urban Development Authority Act, 2016 with the headquarters located at Eluru.

== Jurisdiction ==
The jurisdictional area of EUDA is spread over an area of 3,327.99 km^{2} (1,284.94 sq mi). It covers 463 villages in 35 mandals of West Godavari district. The below table lists the urban areas of EUDA.

Jurisdiction
Settlement Type	Name	Total
Municipal Corporations	Eluru	1
Municipalities	Bhimavaram, Kovvur, Narasapuram, Nidadavole, Palakollu, Tadepalligudem, Tanuku	7
Nagar Panchayat	Jangareddigudem	1
