= Dharmavaram Municipality =

Local self government in Andhra Pradesh, India

- Formation: 1964
- Merger of: Municipal Corporation
- Type: Governmental organization
- Legal status: Local government
- Purpose: Civic administration
- Headquarters: Dharmavaram
- Location: Dharmavaram, Anantapur district, Andhra Pradesh, India
- Official language: Telugu
- Municipal Commissioner: Pramod Kumar
- Main organ: Committee

Dharmavaram Municipality is the local self-government of the city of Dharmavaram, located in the Indian state of Andhra Pradesh. It is classified as a selection grade municipality.

== History ==
The municipality was formed in 1964, along with the Kadiri Municipality in Anantapur District.

== Administration ==
The municipality is spread over an area of 40.45 km^{2} (15.62 mi^{2}) and has 40 election wards. The present chairperson of the municipality is Lingam Nirmala and the commissioner is B.Rama Mohan.

== Awards and achievements ==
In 2015, it is one among the 31 cities in the state to be a part of water supply and sewerage services mission known as Atal Mission for Rejuvenation and Urban Transformation (AMRUT). In 2015, as per the Swachh Bharat Abhiyan of the Ministry of Urban Development, Dharmavaram Municipality was ranked 224th in the country.

== See also ==
- List of municipalities in Andhra Pradesh
