= Tirupati Municipal Corporation =

Local civic body in Tirupati, Andhra Pradesh, India

Tirupati Municipal Corporation Tirupati nagara pālaka Samstha

Type
- Type: Municipal Corporation of the Tirupati

History
- Founded: 1886 (140 years ago)

Leadership
- Mayor: Manne Srinivasa Prasad, TDP
- Deputy Mayor: Vacant
- Corporation Commissioner: M.Jayakrishna IAS (2026)

Structure
- Seats: 66
- Political groups: Government (60) Kutami (60): TDP (38); JSP (19); BJP (03); Opposition (06): YSRCP (03); IND (03)

Elections
- Last election: 1 November 2026
- Next election: 2031

Meeting place
- Alipiri Road, Opposite to Nehru Municipal Grounds, Tirupati, Andhra Pradesh 517501

Website
- TMC website

The Tirupati Municipal Corporation (TMC) is the civic body that governs the city of Tirupati in the Indian state of Andhra Pradesh. It is one of the three corporations in the state, alongside Kakinada and Visakhapatnam to feature in Smart City project. Established in the year 2007, the executive power of the TMC is vested in the Municipal Commissioner, an Indian Administrative Service (IAS) officer appointed by the Government of Andhra Pradesh.Municipal Corporation mechanism in India was introduced during British Rule with formation of municipal corporation in Madras (Chennai) in 1688, later followed by municipal corporations in Bombay (Mumbai) and Calcutta (Kolkata) by 1762.

== Timeline ==
The Tirupati Municipality was formed on 1 April 1886. The municipality saw many gradations over the years and formed as municipal corporation on 2 March 2007. The following table shows the timeline of the municipality:

Type of municipality	Upgraded
Municipality	1 April 1886
First grade	12 January 1965
Second grade	1 October 1962
Special grade	13 February 1970
Selection Grade	7 October 1998
Municipal Corporation	2 March 2007
Greater Municipal Corporation(Proposal)	25 October 2025

== List of Mayors ==
Tirupati Municipal Corporation (TMC)
Sno.	Mayor	DY Mayor	Term start	Term end	Party	Notes
1.	Dr.R.Sireesha Yadav	M.Narayana; B.Abhinay Reddy	2021	2024	YSR Congress Party	First Mayor of TMC
1.	Dr.R.Sireesha Yadav	R.C.Munikrishna	2024	2026	Telugu Desam Party	First Mayor of TMC
2.	Manne Srinivasa Prasad		2026	2029	Telugu Desam Party	

S.No.	Party name	Symbol	Won	Change
1	YSR Congress Party		48	Steady
2	Telugu Desam Party		1	Steady

== Civic administration ==
The area of Tirupati Municipal Corporation was 16.59 km^{2} (6.41 mi^{2}), when it was formed as a corporation. The present area after expansion is 27.44 km^{2} (10.59 mi^{2}). The corporation population as per the 2011 census was 374,260. the present commissioner of the corporation is Mrs. N Mourya IAS.

== Functions ==
Tirupati Municipal Corporation is created for the following functions:

- Planning for the town including its surroundings which are covered under its Department's Urban Planning Authority .
- Approving construction of new buildings and authorising use of land for various purposes.
- Improvement of the town's economic and Social status.
- Arrangements of water supply towards commercial, residential and industrial purposes.
- Planning for fire contingencies through Fire Service Departments.
- Creation of solid waste management, public health system and sanitary services.
- Working for the development of ecological aspect like development of Urban Forestry and making guidelines for environmental protection.
- Working for the development of weaker sections of the society like mentally and physically handicapped, old age and gender biased people.
- Making efforts for improvement of slums and poverty removal in the town.

== Revenue sources ==
The following are the Income sources for the Corporation from the Central and State Government.

=== Revenue from taxes ===
Following is the Tax related revenue for the corporation.

- Property tax.
- Profession tax.
- Entertainment tax.
- Grants from Central and State Government like Goods and Services Tax.
- Advertisement tax.

=== Revenue from non-tax sources ===
Following is the Non Tax related revenue for the corporation.

- Water usage charges.
- Fees from Documentation services.
- Rent received from municipal property.
- Funds from municipal bonds.

=== Revenue from taxes ===
Following is the Tax related revenue for the corporation.

- Property tax.
- Profession tax.
- Entertainment tax.
- Grants from Central and State Government like Goods and Services Tax.
- Advertisement tax.

=== Revenue from non-tax sources ===
Following is the Non Tax related revenue for the corporation.

- Water usage charges.
- Fees from Documentation services.
- Rent received from municipal property.
- Funds from municipal bonds.

== Municipal elections ==
=== 2021 ordinary elections ===
Political party	Symbol	Won	Change
YSR Congress Party		48	Steady
Telugu Desam Party		1	Steady
Jana Sena Party		0	Steady
Bharatiya Janata Party		0	Steady

== Expansion Proposal ==
In October 2025, the Tirupati Municipal Council approved a major proposal to expand the limits of the corporation from 30.17 square kilometres to 238.8 square kilometres, bringing 63 surrounding villages under its jurisdiction. The newly included areas are drawn from the Tirupati Rural, Renigunta, Chandragiri, and Yerpedu mandals. The proposal has been submitted to the Government of Andhra Pradesh (GoAP) for final approval.

The expansion aims to strengthen urban governance, enhance infrastructure planning, and ensure better coordination in public service delivery across the extended region. Officials have stated that the move will help address issues related to rapid urbanisation, such as traffic management, sanitation, and housing needs.

Once approved, the expansion will make Tirupati one of the largest municipal corporations in the Rayalaseema region, covering nearly eight times its previous area and serving as a model for integrated urban development in Andhra Pradesh.
