= Ichchapuram Municipality =

- Formation: 1986
- Merger of: Municipal Corporation
- Type: Governmental organization
- Legal status: Local government
- Purpose: Civic administration
- Headquarters: Ichchapuram
- Location: Ichchapuram, Srikakulam district, Andhra Pradesh, India
- Official language: Telugu
- Municipal Commissioner: CH.Satyanarayana
- Main organ: Committee

Ichchapuram Municipality is the local self government in Ichchapuram of the Indian state of Andhra Pradesh. It is classified as a 3rd Grade Municipality. It constitutes total population of 36,493.

== Administration ==
Ichchapuram municipality was formed in the year 1986. The municipality is spread over an area of 25.28 km^{2} (9.76 sq mi) and has 23 election wards. each represented by a ward member and the wards committee is headed by a chairperson. The present municipal commissioner of the town is CH.Satyanarayana.

== See also ==
- List of municipalities in Andhra Pradesh
