= Atmakur, Nellore district =

Atmakur Atmakuru
- Town
- Location in Andhra Pradesh, India
- Coordinates: 14°37′0.157″N 79°37′28.392″E
- Country: India
- State: Andhra Pradesh
- District: Nellore district
- Mandal: Atmakur

Government
  - Body: Atmakur Municipal Council
  - MLA: Anam Ramanarayana Reddy
  - MP: Vemireddy Prabhakar Reddy

Area
  - Total: 58.68 km^{2} (22.66 sq mi)
- Elevation: 15 m (49 ft)

Population (2011)
  - Total: 30,556
  - Density: 520.7/km^{2} (1,349/sq mi)

Languages
  - Official: Telugu
- Time zone: UTC+5:30 (IST)
- Postal code: 524322
- Vehicle registration: AP26

Atmakur, natively known as Atmakuru, is a town in the Nellore district of the Indian state of Andhra Pradesh. It functions as a municipality within the Atmakur mandal and serves as the administrative headquarters for both the mandal and the Atmakur Assembly Constituency. The town plays a key role in local governance and administration, acting as a central hub for surrounding villages and regions within the Nellore district.

== Governance ==
Civic administration

Atmakur Municipal Council is the seat of local government which administers atmakur town.

Politics

Atmakur (Assembly constituency) is an assembly constituency of Andhra Pradesh. Present Member of the Legislative Assembly Anam Ramanarayana Reddy from Telugu Desam Party and Member of Parliament, Lok Sabha Vemireddy Prabhakar Reddy from Telugu Desam party (TDP)

== Prominent people ==
Sri Abhinava Ranganatha Parakala Swami (1884–1966), renowned philosopher of Vedanta and scholar of Sanskrit, head of the Mysore Parakala Matha for 41 years. He was known earlier as Atmakur Rangacharya.

Ganga China Kondaiah, freedom fighter and communist party leader, first MLA of Atmakur in Madras and Andhra joint state.

Motapothula Sankar Reddy, freedom fighter and communist party leader served as a President Atmakur Grama Panchayat for 22 years. He was the founder and president of Cooperative Marketing society, Coperative Urban bank and Cooperative house building society. He also established Land Mortagage Bank (LMB), Leather society, Fisherman society and Labor Contract society etc.

Atmakur Venkata Subbaiah Naidu served as a Head Village Administrative Officer for 25 years.

== Education ==
Atmakur, located in the Nellore district of Andhra Pradesh (PIN: 524322), is a regional educational hub for students from nearby villages and towns. The town offers a variety of educational institutions, catering to all levels of learning, from early childhood to higher education.

Schools: Atmakur has around 50 schools, including Anganwadi centers, primary schools, upper primary schools, and high schools. These schools serve both residential and non-residential students, ensuring access to quality education for children in the surrounding areas.

Colleges: The town is home to multiple institutions of higher learning, including:

10 Junior Colleges: Offering intermediate education across a range of streams (arts, science, commerce).

3 Degree Colleges: Providing undergraduate programs in arts, science, and commerce.

1 Government Polytechnic College: Offering diploma courses in various technical fields.

1 B.Ed College: Specializing in teacher training programs for those pursuing a career in education.

1 Engineering College: Providing undergraduate and graduate programs in engineering and technology disciplines.

Vocational Training: Atmakur also hosts 1 Industrial Training Center (ITC), which offers vocational education and hands-on training in trades.

These institutions make Atmakur an important educational center, attracting students from neighboring regions who seek quality education and professional training.

The primary and secondary school education is imparted by government, aided and private schools, under the School Education Department of the state. The medium of instruction followed by different schools are English, Telugu.

== Transport ==
The town is connected by multiple modes of transport, including bus, train, and air travel. Below are the details on how to reach Atmakur.

=== Roadways (BUS) ===
Atmakur is connected to Nellore and other parts of Andhra Pradesh through an extensive road network. The Andhra Pradesh State Road Transport Corporation (APSRTC) runs regular buses to and from Atmakur to major cities like Nellore, Tirupati, Chennai, Vijayawada, and Hyderabad.

Nellore to Atmakur: Buses run frequently (every 20 minutes), with a travel time of approximately 1 to 1.5 hours.

Chennai to Atmakur: Buses are available, taking about 5 to 6 hours.Buses operate regularly and are available throughout the day, offering both air-conditioned and non-air-conditioned options.

Hyderabad to Atmakur: Long-distance buses connect the two cities, and the journey takes around 9 to 11 hours.Buses operate regularly and are available throughout the day, offering both air-conditioned and non-air-conditioned options.

Bangalore to Atmakur: Direct buses are available from Bangalore, and the travel time is approximately 7 to 9 hours. Buses operate regularly and are available throughout the day, offering both air-conditioned and non-air-conditioned options

=== Railways ===
Though Atmakur itself does not have a railway station, the nearest major railway station is Nellore Railway Station, which is approximately 60 km away.

Nellore Railway Station: Serves as a hub for trains coming from Chennai, Hyderabad, Tirupati, Vijayawada, and other parts of India. From Nellore, buses and taxis are available to reach Atmakur.

Atmakur Railway Station - Work in Progress The Atmakur Railway Station is currently under development as part of the Nadikudi–Srikalahasti railway line, a new railway line that will significantly enhance rail connectivity in the region. Once completed, the Atmakur station will serve as an important stop along this line, connecting Atmakur to major cities in Andhra Pradesh and beyond.

The Nadikudi–Srikalahasti railway line is a new project aimed at improving transportation across Andhra Pradesh. It will connect Nadikudi in the Guntur district to Srikalahasti in the Chittoor district, passing through Atmakur in Nellore district. This line is expected to boost the local economy by facilitating easier movement of goods and passengers. Once completed, trains on this route will reduce travel time and improve accessibility to Atmakur.

=== Air ===
The nearest airports to Atmakur are:

Tirupati International Airport (150 km): The closest major airport with domestic flights to cities like Hyderabad, Chennai, and Bangalore.

Chennai International Airport (200 km): The nearest international airport, offering flights to various domestic and international destinations.

Nellore Airport (Proposed): A new airport is under construction near Nellore, which will provide better air connectivity to Atmakur once operational. From these airports, you can reach Atmakur by hiring taxis or taking buses.

== See also ==
- List of towns in Andhra Pradesh
- List of municipalities in Andhra Pradesh
