= Narasapuram Municipality =

- Formation: 1956
- Merger of: Municipal Corporation
- Type: Governmental organization
- Legal status: Local government
- Purpose: Civic administration
- Headquarters: Narasapuram
- Location: Narasapuram, West Godavari district, Andhra Pradesh, India
- Official language: Telugu
- Website: https://narasapur.cdma.ap.gov.in/

Narasapuram Municipality is the local self government in Narasapuram, a town in the Indian state of Andhra Pradesh. It is classified as a first grade municipality.

== Administration ==
The municipality was constituted in 1956 and is spread over an area of 11.32 km^{2} (4.37 mi^{2}) with 31 wards.

== Civic works and services ==
The city municipality implements the use of local language, Telugu in civic services and also publishes Narsapur Times.

== See also ==
- List of municipalities in Andhra Pradesh
