= Chittoor Municipal Corporation =

Local civic body in Andhra Pradesh, India

Chittoor Municipal Corporation Cittūru nagara pālaka saṅghamu చిత్తూరు నగర పాలక సంఘము
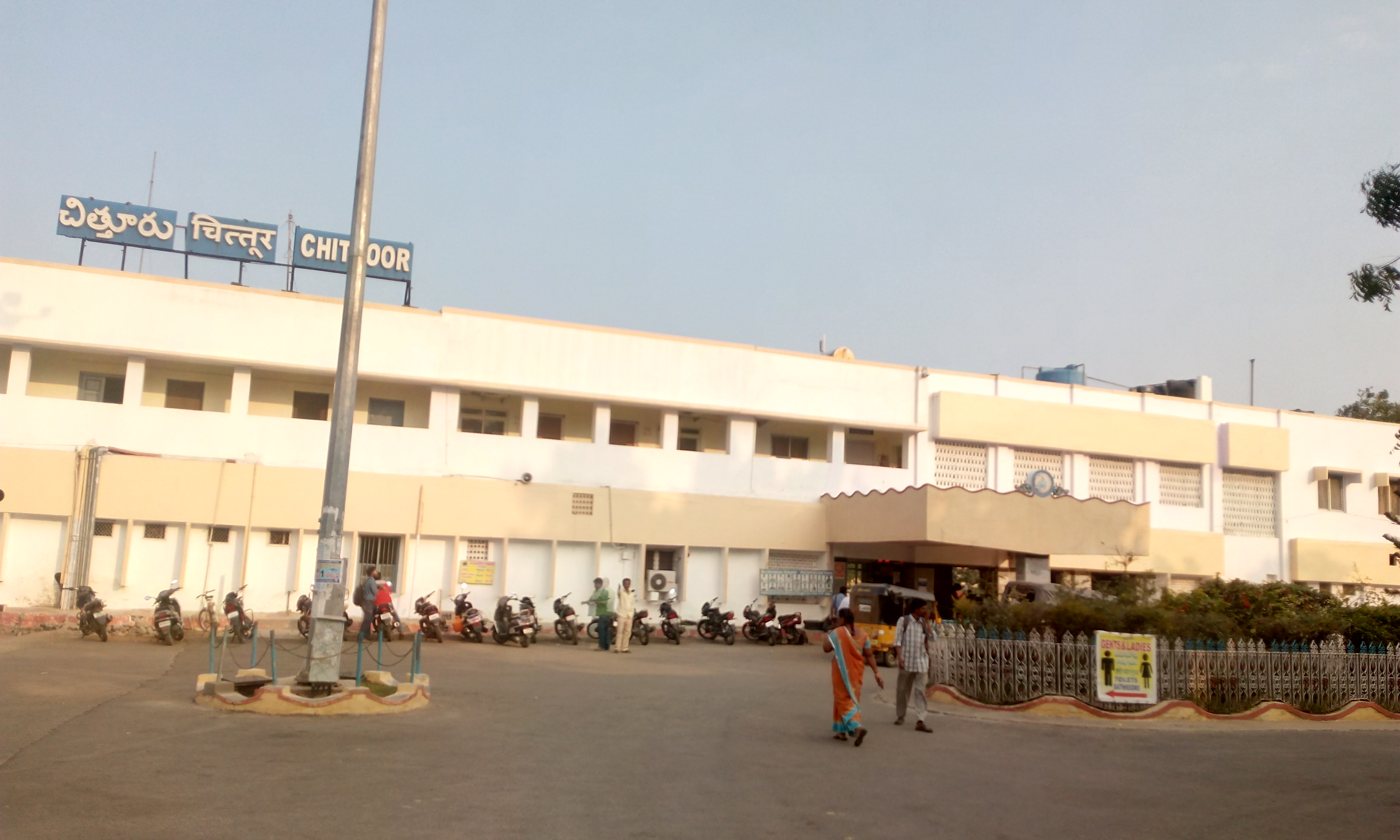

Type
- Type: Municipal Corporation of the Chittoor

History
- Founded: 2012

Leadership
- Mayor: Vacant (since 18 March 2026)
- Deputy Mayor: Vacant (since 18 March 2026)
- Corporation Commissioner: P Narasimha Prasadh
- Seats: 50

Elections
- Last election: 10th March 2021
- Next election: TBH

Meeting place
- NTR Council meeting hall at Chittoor municipal corporation office.

Website
- Chittoor Municipal corporation

Chittoor Municipal Corporation is a civic body of Chittoor in the Indian state of Andhra Pradesh. In 2012 Chittoor Municipality is upgraded to Chittoor Municipal Corporation. Municipal Corporation mechanism in India was introduced during British Rule with formation of municipal corporation in Madras (Chennai) in 1688, later followed by municipal corporations in Bombay (Mumbai) and Calcutta (Kolkata) by 1762. Chittoor Municipal Corporation is headed by Mayor of city and governed by Commissioner.

== History ==
The municipality of Chittoor was constituted as a III–Grade in the year 1917. It was then upgraded to II–Grade in 1950, I–Grade in 1965, Special Grade in 1980 and then to Selection Grade in 2000. It was upgraded to corporation on 7 September 2012.

== Jurisdiction ==
The corporation is spread over an area of 95.97 km^{2} (37.05 sq mi) with 51 election wards. It also includes fourteen villages namely, Obanapalli, Mangasamudram, Santhapet, Anupalli, Bandapalle, Doddipalle, Kukkalapalli, Mapakshi, Murakambattu, Muthirevula, Narigapalle, Ramapuram, Thenebanda, Thimmsanipalle and Varigapalle which were merged into the corporation.

== List of Mayors ==
Chittoor Municipal Corporation (CMC)
| Sno. | Mayor | DY Mayor | Term start | Term end | Party | Notes |
|---|---|---|---|---|---|---|
| 1. | K. Anuradha | R. Subramanyam | 2014 | 2015 | Telugu Desam Party | First Women Mayor of CMC |
| 2. | K. Hemalatha | R. Subramanyam | 2015 | 2019 | Telugu Desam Party | |
| 3. | S. Amudha | R. Chandrasekhar; N. Rajesh Kumar Reddy | 2021 | 2024 | YSR Congress Party | |
| 3. | S. Amudha | R. Chandrasekhar | 2024 | 2026 | Telugu Desam Party | |

=== 2021 ordinary elections ===
| S.No. | Party name | Symbol | Won | Change |
|---|---|---|---|---|
| 1 | YSR Congress Party | | 46 | Steady |
| 2 | Telugu Desam Party | | 3 | Steady |
| 3 | Independents | | 1 | Steady |

== Administration ==
The corporation is administered by an elected body, headed by a mayor. The corporation population as per the 2011 Census of India was 153,756. The present commissioner of the corporation is P Narasimha prasadh and the mayor is S Amudha.

== Functions ==
Chittoor Municipal Corporation is created for the following functions:

- Planning for the town including its surroundings which are covered under its Department's Urban Planning Authority .
- Approving construction of new buildings and authorising use of land for various purposes.
- Improvement of the town's economic and Social status.
- Arrangements of water supply towards commercial, residential and industrial purposes.
- Planning for fire contingencies through Fire Service Departments.
- Creation of solid waste management, public health system and sanitary services.
- Working for the development of ecological aspect like development of Urban Forestry and making guidelines for environmental protection.
- Working for the development of weaker sections of the society like mentally and physically handicapped, old age and gender biased people.
- Making efforts for improvement of slums and poverty removal in the town.

== Revenue sources ==
The following are the Income sources for the Corporation from the Central and State Government.

=== Revenue from taxes ===
Following is the Tax related revenue for the corporation.

- Property tax.
- Profession tax.
- Entertainment tax.
- Grants from Central and State Government like Goods and Services Tax.
- Advertisement tax.

=== Revenue from non-tax sources ===
Following is the Non Tax related revenue for the corporation.

- Water usage charges.
- Fees from Documentation services.
- Rent received from municipal property.
- Funds from municipal bonds.
