= Gudur, Kurnool =

Gudur Guduru
- Town
- Location in Andhra Pradesh, India
- Coordinates: 15.775°N 77.807°E
- Country: India
- State: Andhra Pradesh
- District: Kurnool
- Established: 2011
- Talukas: Kodumur, Kurnool district

Government
  - Type: Municipality
  - Body: Nagar Palika

Area
  - Total: 47.35 km^{2} (18.28 sq mi)

Languages
  - Official: Telugu, తెలుగు
- Time zone: UTC+5:30 (IST)
- PIN: 518466
- Vehicle registration: AP
- Website: No website

Gudur, natively known as Guduru, is a Nagar Panchayath and a Mandal HQ of Gudur Mandal in Kurnool district in the state of Andhra Pradesh in India.

It comes under Kodumur assembly constituency and Kurnool Parliament Constituency.

- Gudur is Situated on Yemmiganur - Kurnool Road.
- Nearest Railway Station is Kurnool City Railway Station.
- Nearest Airport is Kurnool Airport.

== Demographics ==
According to 2011 Census Gudur Town has a population of 22,270.

== Governance ==
The town was upgraded from Gram panchayat to Nagar panchayat on 23 June 2011. Gudur is 27 km away from Kurnool.
