= B. Kothakota =

Town in Andhra Pradesh, India

- Town
- Beerangi Kothakota
- Interactive map of B. Kothakota
- Location within Andhra Pradesh
- Coordinates: 13°39′34″N 78°15′47″E
- Country: India
- State: Andhra Pradesh
- District: Annamayya
- Mandal: B. Kothakota

Government
  - Type: Nagar Panchayat

Area
  - Total: 30 km^{2} (12 sq mi)
- Elevation: 716 m (2,349 ft)

Population (2011)
  - Total: 26,191
  - Density: 870/km^{2} (2,300/sq mi)

Languages
  - Official: Telugu
- Time zone: UTC+5:30 (IST)
- PIN: 517370
- STD code: 08582
- Vehicle registration: AP-39

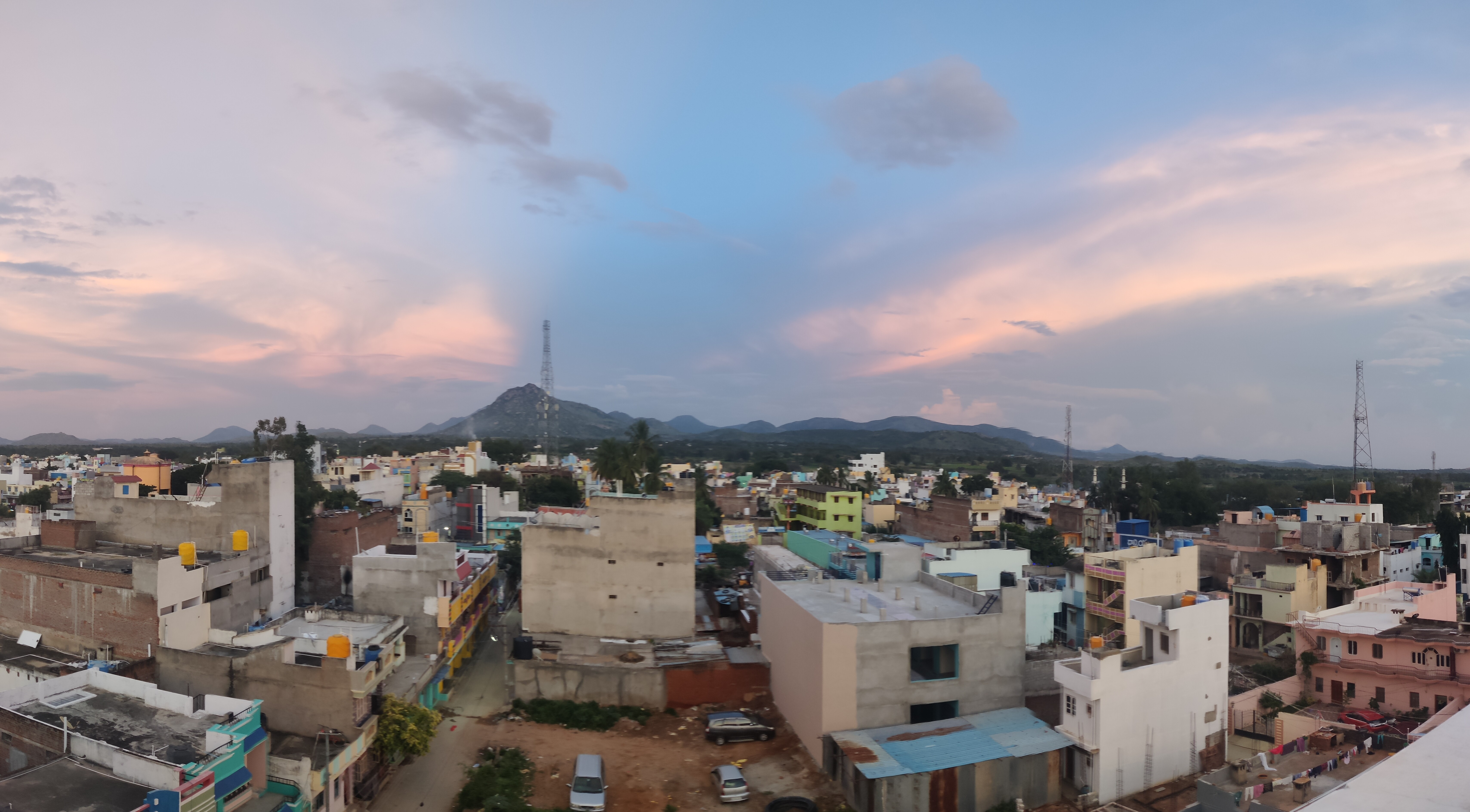
B. Kothakota town view towards east

Beerangi Kothakota is a town and nagar panchayat in Thamballapalle assembly constituency, Annamayya district, Andhra Pradesh, India. Beerangi Kottakota is known as B.Kothakota. It is located near the state border with Karnataka, approximately 37 kilometres southwest of the district capital Madanapalle. In the year 2011, the town has a total population of 26,191. In the year 2020 Andhrapradesh state government declared B. Kothakota as Nagar Panchayat. Horsley hills is located near to B. Kothakota.

== Geography ==
B. Kothakota is located on the southern part of Annamayya District. Kotha Kota Cheruvu is in the southeast of the town. Its average elevation is 716 metres above the sea level.

== Demographics ==
According to the 2011 Indian Census, B. Kothakota has 6,250 households. Among the 26,191 residents, 13,586 are male and 12,605 are female. The overall literacy rate is 62.62%, with 9,478 of the male population and 6,924 of the female population being literate.
