= Atmakur, Nandyal district =

Atmakur
- Town
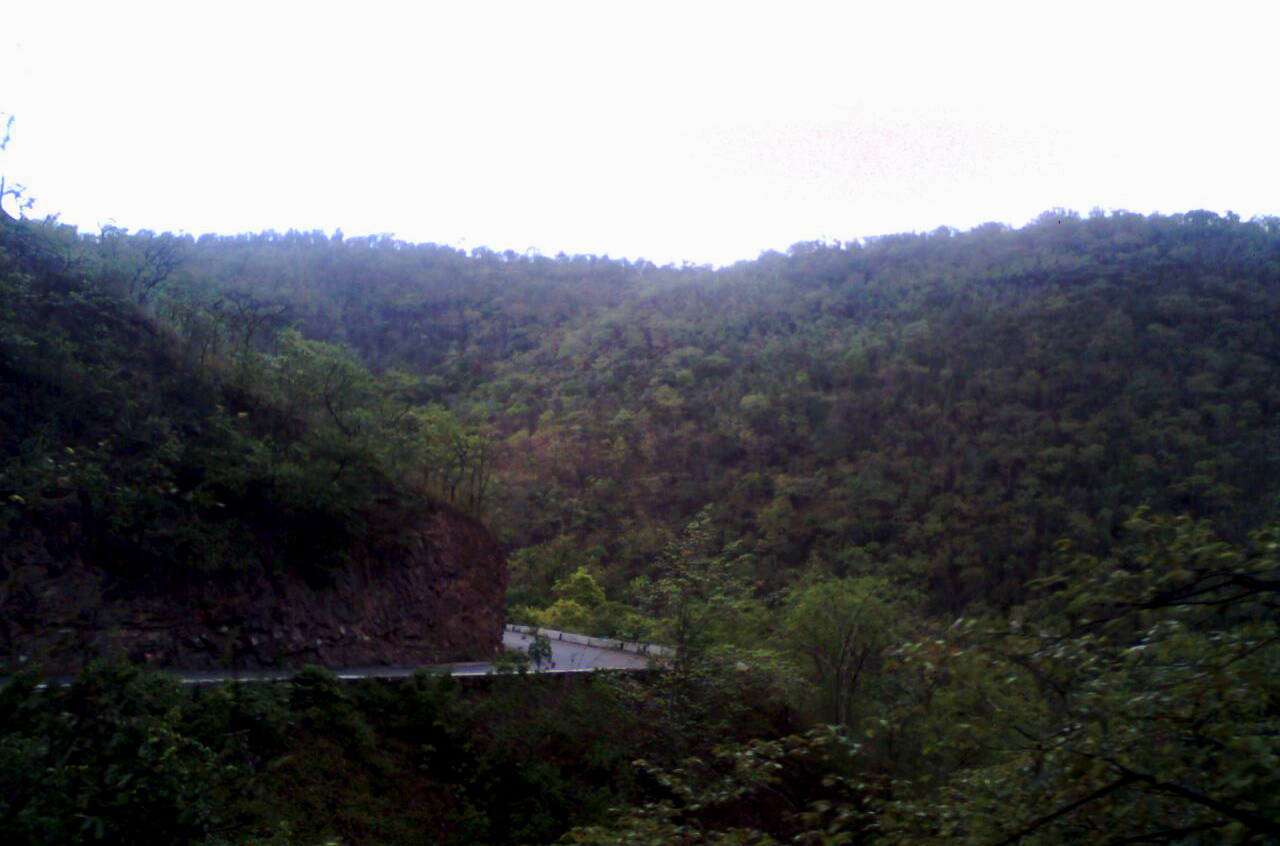
- Nallamalla hills near Atmakur

- Location in Andhra Pradesh, India
- Coordinates: 15°52′44.432″N 78°35′1.723″E
- Country: India
- State: Andhra Pradesh
- District: Nandyal

Government
  - Type: Municipality

Area
  - Total: 43.72 km^{2} (16.88 sq mi)

Population (2011)
  - Total: 45,703
  - Density: 1,045/km^{2} (2,707/sq mi)

Languages
  - Official: Telugu
- Time zone: UTC+5:30 (IST)
- PIN: 518422
- Telephone code: +91–8517
- Vehicle registration: AP

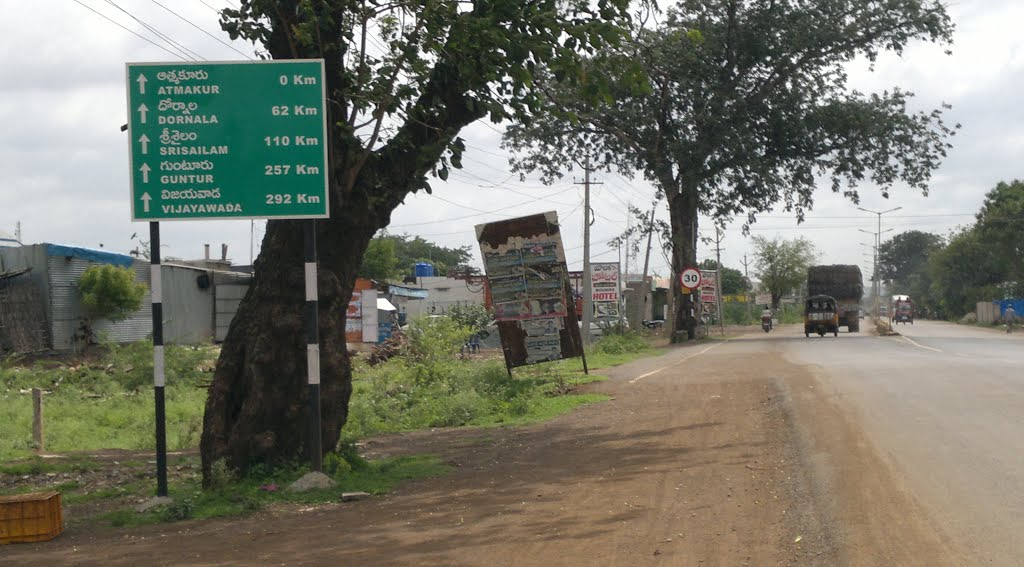
Atmakur Entrance

Atmakur, natively known as Atmakuru, is a town and revenue division in the Nandyal district of Andhra Pradesh, India.

== Geography ==
Atmakur is a Municipality and Revenue Division HQ, located 67 km from Kurnool district in Andhra Pradesh. It serves as a major transit point connecting important cities including Kurnool and Guntur. The route to Srisailam from Kurnool and Nandyal also traverses through Atmakur. The geography says that Atmakur is surrounded by Nallamalla Forest. Srisailam Right Main Canal which provides irrigation water to Kurnool, Anantapur, Kadapa and Chittoor districts and Chennai City starts near Atmakur only. Sangamaheshwaram the place where seven rivers meet is located around 30 km from Atmakur. The population of Atmakur according to 2011 Census is 45,703.

== Governance ==
Atmakur is a Municipality of Grade - 2 Category. According to 2011 Census, the town has population of 45,703.

== Transport ==
The Andhra Pradesh State Road Transport Corporation operates bus services from Atmakur-K bus station.

== Entertainment ==
=== Movies ===
1. Ranga Mahal 70mm
2. Lakshmi Ranga 7Omm
