= Tanuku =

Tanuku తణుకు
- Town
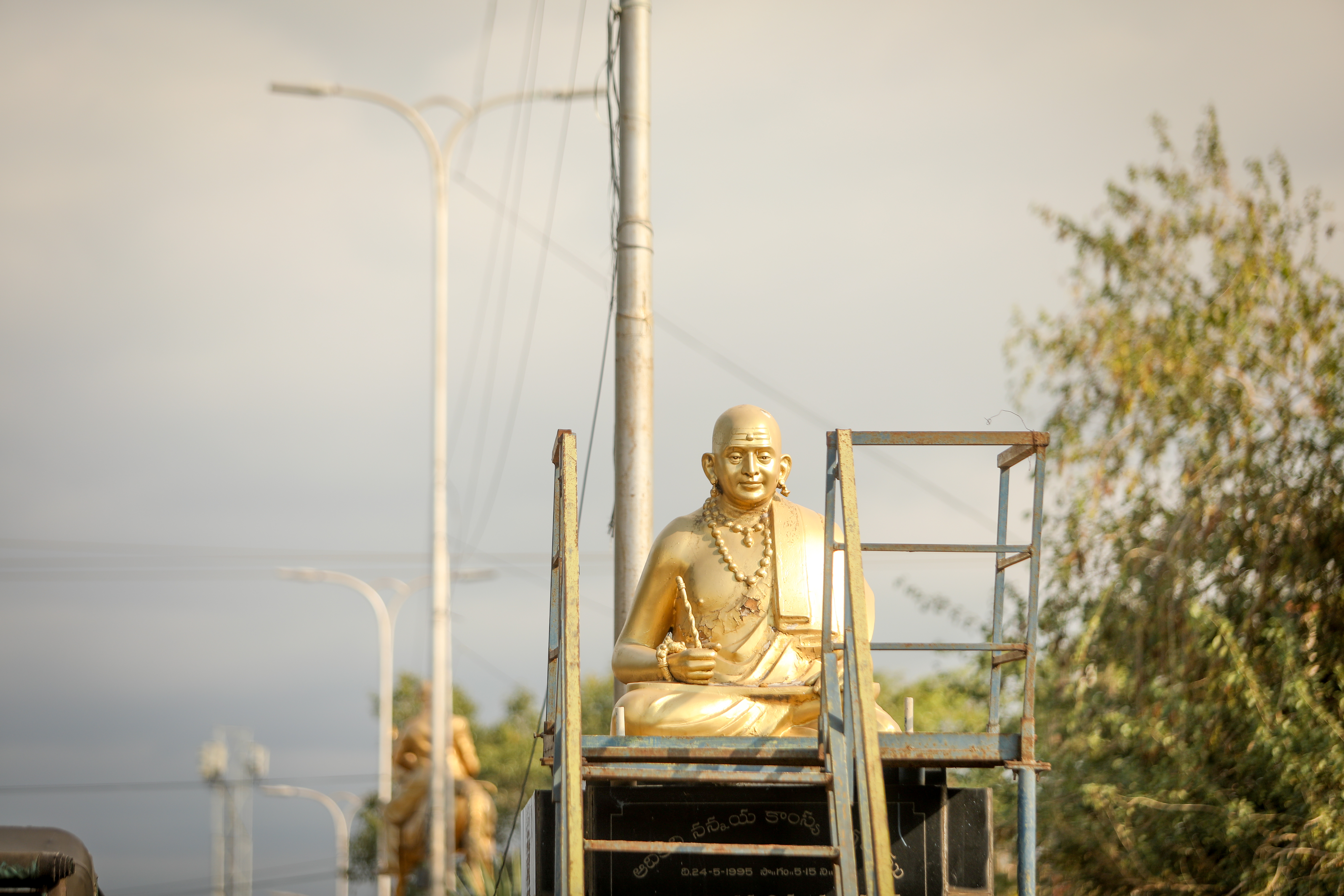

- Location in Andhra Pradesh
- Coordinates: 16.7566°N 81.6770°E
- Country: India
- State: Andhra Pradesh
- District: West Godavari
- Mandal: Tanuku mandal

Government
  - Type: Selection Grade Municipality
  - Body: Tanuku Municipality
  - MLA: Arimilli Radha Krishna

Area
  - Land: 24.83 km^{2} (9.59 sq mi)
- Elevation: 14.84 m (48.7 ft)

Population (2011)
  - Town: 90,430
  - Density: 3,642/km^{2} (9,433/sq mi)
  - Metro: 116,000

Languages
  - Official: Telugu
- Time zone: UTC+5:30 (IST)
- PIN: 534 211, 534 215, 534 216, 534 218, 534 222
- Area code: 08819
- Vehicle registration: AP 37
- Website: tanuku.cdma.ap.gov.in

Tanuku is a town in West Godavari district of the Indian state of Andhra Pradesh. It is known for its historical administrative role, early educational institutions, and regional commercial significance. Tanuku functioned as a taluk headquarters during the Madras Presidency in Godavari district under British rule in 1850's. The town developed as a local administrative and commercial center in the late 19th and early 20th centuries.

Educational development in Tanuku dates back to the early 1900s, with the establishment of institutions such as the Zilla Parishad Boys High School in 1902, contributing to literacy and regional education. It is the mandal headquarters of Tanuku mandal . Tanuku is the Third largest in the West Godavari District after Bhimavaram, and Tadepalligudem in terms of population. Tanuku is the Textile Hub of both West Godavari district and East Godavari district. There are a Significant number of Large scale and Small scale Spinning Mills

Tanuku serves as a regional service center for surrounding mandals. Its historical administrative role, combined with its educational institutions and judicial presence, contribute to its importance in the district.

Tanuku has a historical association with judicial administration dating back to the British colonial period, when it functioned as a taluk headquarters under the Madras Presidency. During this period, taluk headquarters typically hosted subordinate courts such as Munsif or Magistrate courts, serving local civil and criminal jurisdiction.

Following Indian independence, the judicial system in Tanuku was reorganized under the state judiciary framework, leading to the establishment and expansion of civil and criminal courts to cater to the growing population and administrative needs of the region. In the present day, Tanuku hosts a court complex comprising multiple levels of judiciary, including courts functioning under the jurisdiction of the Andhra Pradesh High Court. These include district-level and subordinate courts that serve Tanuku and surrounding mandals.

== History ==
Right from the ancient times Tanuku has got its own importance and significance in every aspect. Tanuku has its special identification as it is the political origin for the West Godavari District. Tanuku is a feather ones cap as it occupied an eminient position on the world map as a producer and supplier of the Rocket Fuel UDMH-MMD. The historical River "Gosthani" is flowing on the three parts of the town and given an impression to viewers as a peninsula. And it has a spiritual power that anyone who have a bath from this River their sins will be floated away. The surrounding villages have a great historical significance as they stand for a fabulous historical monuments. Today Tanuku town has its own recognition throughout the world. It has a historical evidence behind the origin of its Tanuku . According to the records of the history its was the capital of the king of gaint Tarakasura's kingdom Tarakapuri. The name of the familiar by their own names. This evidence strengthens the historical records. The following historical evidences proves ther records of the various villages that are surrounded Tanuku . In those days the present Palangi is known as Pulangi(Stall of Flowers) and the Chivatam is known as Srivatam (The Financial Centre). In those days the paddy go down of Tarakapuri was today's Vadluru those days Swarnagaram( Place of gold) today's Paidiparru. Those days Ratnala Angi (Stall of Crystals) todays Relangi. After the wedding of Lord Parameswara with Parvati, they hava born a son Kumara Swamy and the happend to be the son-in-law of Devendra. In that time the Tarakasura was negletted by Devendra as a result Tarakasura greq anger and derocioulsy invaded over devendra. Then Kumara Swamy decended to earth to rescue his father-in-law. The place where kumara Swamy landed is today known as Komaravaram. The place where Indra resided is now called Illindra Parru. The place where all the Angels are stayed is now known as Velpuru ( Place of Angels). The place where Veerabhadrapuram. the place where Uraga Raju resided is known as Undrajavaram. The place where Goddess Vijayalakshmi resided is known as Mahalashmi Cheruvu. The residents of the three words the holy priests are resided a place which is today called as "Vipparru". These are the different evidences that proves that Tanuku has historical significance. Tanuku is the birth place of the greatest poet in Telugu and the first poet in Telugu language Adikavi Nannayya. He conducted an Yagna under "Jammi" tree and translated Mahabaratha from Sanskrit to Telugu. In the modern world the technology has been developing but Tanuku is no where least in the world as it successes in a remarkable achievement of manufacturing of Rocket Fuel UDMH-MMD. The remarkable achievement of Andhra Sugars of manufacturing Rocket Fuel has been given a ground on the world map for India as the fifth country in the world.

== Geography ==
Tanuku is a located at 16.75°N 81.7°E. It has a tropical climate and an annual rainfall of 313.4 millimetres (31.34 cm). The Gosthani River flows through the town.

== Demographics ==
As of 2011 census of India, the town had a population 90430 and Tanuku urban agglomeration metro region has a population 116000.

== Civic administration and politics ==
Tanuku Municipality was constituted in 1979 as a second grade municipality. It was upgraded to first grade in 2002 and has 34 election wards and later upgraded to selection grade municipality in 2025 and has 44 election wards. Its jurisdiction is spread over an area of 24.83 km^{2} (9.59 mi^{2}). The municipal commissioner is M. Sambasivarao.

Tanuku assembly constituency is a constituency of the Andhra Pradesh Legislative Assembly. It is one of the assembly segments that make up the Narasapuram Lok Sabha constituency.

== Economy ==
Andhra Sugars Limited supplies liquid hydrogen to the ISRO, for using it as a rocket propellant in satellite launch vehicles. The other byproducts are also used in liquor, paper and power industries.

Tanuku has historically been associated with rice mills, oil mills, textile-related, Cardboard, Paper, Hair Industry, Bulk Durg, Aquaculture and poultry activities, along with other small and medium enterprises. These industries contribute to local employment and support the regional economy.

== Culture ==
Tanuku is the birthplace of Adikavi Nannaya, regarded as the first poet of Telugu language. He is credited with translation of the Mahabharata from Sanskrit to Telugu. Javvadi Yamini Narasambika in dance, AJS Ramareddy in literature and poetry and Dampuri Narayanarao in folk arts have won the Ugadi Purasakarams, a cultural event organized on April 8, 2016, at YMHA hall, Eluru . The Youth Cultural Celebrations is one such example of promoting cultural activities. It is associated with notable literary figures such as Devarakonda Balagangadhara Tilak, a prominent Telugu poet and writer.

== Transport ==
The town has a total road length of 148.6 km (92.3 mi). The Andhra Pradesh State Road Transport Corporation operates bus services from Tanuku bus station. Tanuku railway station is categorized as a Non-Suburban Grade-5 (NSG-5) station in the Vijayawada railway division. Rajahmundry Airport is situated about 65 km (40 mi) from the town. The nearest international airport, Vijaywada Airport is located about 118 km (73 mi) from the town.

== Education ==
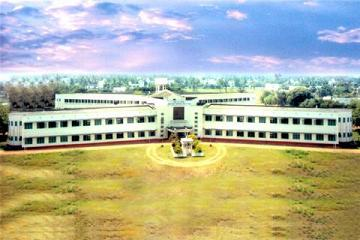
SMVM Polytechnic College

The primary and secondary school education is imparted by government, aided and private schools, under the School Education Department of the state. The medium of instruction followed by different schools are English, Telugu. Higher education institutions include the SMVM Polytechnic College which provides technical courses. SKSD Mahila Kalasala which offers under graduate and post graduate courses.S.C.I.M Government Degree and P.G. College which offers under graduate and post graduate courses.

== Healthcare ==
Tanuku functions as a regional healthcare center with a combination of government and private medical facilities. The town has a District Government Hospital along with several private hospitals, clinics, and diagnostic centers providing primary and secondary healthcare services.

Residents of nearby mandals depend on Tanuku for routine medical care, while advanced treatments are referred to larger cities.

== Sports ==
Chitturi Subba Rao – Gopichand Badminton Academy is the badminton academy under the Chitturi Subba Rao Trust for training the under 13 badminton players. The academy hosted the COSCO A.P. State Open Mini Badminton Championship 2016. The Tanuku Football Club is one of the teams in the Football League of West Godavari tournament, promoting the football.

Sports personalities from the town include Rella Sanjeeva Rao, an under-14 badminton player, top ranker for U-13 level, and gold medalist at national level championship.

== See also ==
- List of municipalities in Andhra Pradesh
