= Atal Mission for Rejuvenation and Urban Transformation =

Indian government urban renewal scheme

Atal Mission for Rejuvenation and Urban Transformation (AMRUT)
- AMRUT scheme logo
- Country: India
- Prime Minister(s): Narendra Modi
- Ministry: Ministry of Housing and Urban Affairs
- Key people: Hardeep Singh Puri
- Launched: 25 June 2015; 11 years ago
- Status: Active
- Website: AMRUT Yojana

Atal Mission for Rejuvenation and Urban Transformation (AMRUT) is a development mission launched by Prime Minister of India Narendra Modi in June 2015 with the focus to establish infrastructure that could ensure adequate robust sewage networks and water supply for urban transformation by implementing urban revival projects. Rajasthan was the first state in the country to submit State Annual Action Plan under Atal Mission for Rejuvenation and Urban Transformation (AMRUT). The scheme Housing for All by 2022 and Atal Mission for Rejuvenation and Urban Transformation (AMRUT) were launched on the same day. The scheme is dependent with public–private partnership (PPP) model. If required, various other schemes like Swachh Bharat Mission, Housing for All 2022, along with the local state schemes like that related to water supply and sewerage and other infrastructure related schemes can be linked to AMRUT.

== Mission ==
The purpose of Atal Mission for Rejuvenation and Urban Transformation (AMRUT) is to (i) ensure that every household has access to a tap with assured supply of water and a sewerage connection; (ii) increase the amenity value of cities by developing greenery and well maintained open spaces (e.g. parks); and (iii) reduce pollution by switching to public transport or constructing facilities for non-motorized transport (e.g.walking and cycling).

== Finance ==
About ₹1 lakh crore (US$10 billion) investment on urban development under Smart Cities Mission and the Atal Mission for Rejuvenation and Urban Transformation of 500 cities has already been approved by the government.

== Eligibility ==
SAAP(State Annual Action Plans) is a consolidated plan of all the city level SLIPs(Service Level Improvement Plan) of all proposed AMRUT cities in the respective states. A formulation on City level SLIP is done based on diligent estimation of ambiguities in the availability of infrastructure like water supply, sewerage network, draining system, transportation facilities, available digital and internet facilities, industrial facilities etc. 135litres per capita per day is another factor in the process including water supply and sewerage connections to all urban households.

== Targets ==
Some of the broad targets of AMRUT scheme are ascertaining that every one has access to tap water and sewerage facilities, greenery like parks and open spaces are well maintained, digital and smart facilities like weather prediction, internet and WiFi facilities, pollution reduction by encouraging the public for using cheaper but secure public transport etc.

== Implementation ==
=== First Phase Implementation ===
90 cities in Andhra Pradesh, Gujarat and Rajasthan have been allocated funds under the first phase of the mission. A huge allocation of fund has been done for them by the Apex Committee of AMRUT under the State Annual Action Plans (SAAP) for these states for period of 2015-16. At each city level a City Mission Management Units (CMMUs) is proposed to be set up which will assist the Urban Local Body (ULB) in terms of staff and technology.

=== Later Phase ===
The flagship program has already invited a huge fund and participation of big companies. In later stage the rest of the cities out of 500 will be finalized and implemented for the next phase.

== State Progress ==
=== West Bengal ===
Jangipur (Lok Sabha constituency) is a parliamentary constituency in Murshidabad district in the Indian state of West Bengal. The city is approved as for AMRUT project recently.

=== Andhra Pradesh ===
Amaravati, the new capital of the state, has been included under the AMRUT scheme. The work for planning was started to fulfill the different criteria like sewerage system, 135 litres per capita per day etc.

=== Haryana ===
Under the AMRUT the state government has announced to provide with the cities and 18 ULBs(Urban Local Bodies), facilities including water supply, sewerage connection and development of greenery. The scheme has also been linked with the flagship program Swachh Bharat Mission.

=== Jammu and Kashmir ===
Srinagar Municipal Corporation (SMC) is working with professionals sent from the center under AMRUT mission and workshops are being organized regarding the management and funding of the scheme.

=== Maharashtra ===
The state government has announced 44 cities in the state which are aimed at urban transformation and will be undertaken for 5 years.

=== Madhya Pradesh ===
The state government has submitted SAAP Plan to improve the infrastructure including water connections and sewerage network in 34 mission cities under AMRUT. This includes urban local bodies with over ten lakhs population will have more of the project costs than those with a population of less than 10 lakhs as per information provided to the Ministry of Urban Development.

=== Tamil Nadu ===
Tamil Nadu state government has submitted a plan to enhance underground drainage systems, uninterrupted water supplies, basic public health facilities, improvisation of transport systems connecting historically important places in the state for 26 Cities and Municipalities in the state List of AMRUT Smart cities in Tamil Nadu.

=== Telangana ===
The state government has submitted a plan to enhance water supply in 12 AMRUT cities in the state during the fiscal year 2015-16.

== See also ==
- Housing for All scheme in India
- Housing in India
