= Municipal commissioner =

Local government official in various countries

In many countries, a municipal commissioner is an official in a municipal government such as that of a city or a town.

== India ==
In India, every Municipal Corporation is administratively headed by a Municipal Commissioner (also known as Corporation Secretary), who is the de facto head of the municipal corporation, the form of government which is usually granted to a city of more than one million in population.

== Sri Lanka ==
In Sri Lanka, under the Municipal Council Ordinance there is a municipal commissioner of each municipal council. The commissioner is the chief administrative officer and is the highest ranking non-elected officer of the municipality and in most cases be an officer of the Sri Lanka Administrative Service on secondment. In the absence of the mayor, the municipal commissioner serves as the chief executive of the municipality and between the end of term of a mayor and election of a new mayor, the municipal commissioner would serve as the officer implementing the powers and function of the municipal council. The common seal of the council is retained by the municipal commissioner. The municipal council may appoint a Charity Commissioner of the Council.

== Sweden ==
Swedish municipalities generally employ one or more politicians as municipal commissioners (Swedish: kommunalråd) one of which is usually the chairman of the executive committee.

In Sweden, the municipal commissioners for finance of Stockholm Municipality (finansborgarråd) is often translated as Mayor of Stockholm, because the municipal commissioner for finance has become the top politician of Stockholm Municipality since the Stockholm municipal reform 1940.
