= Mellempudi =

- Village
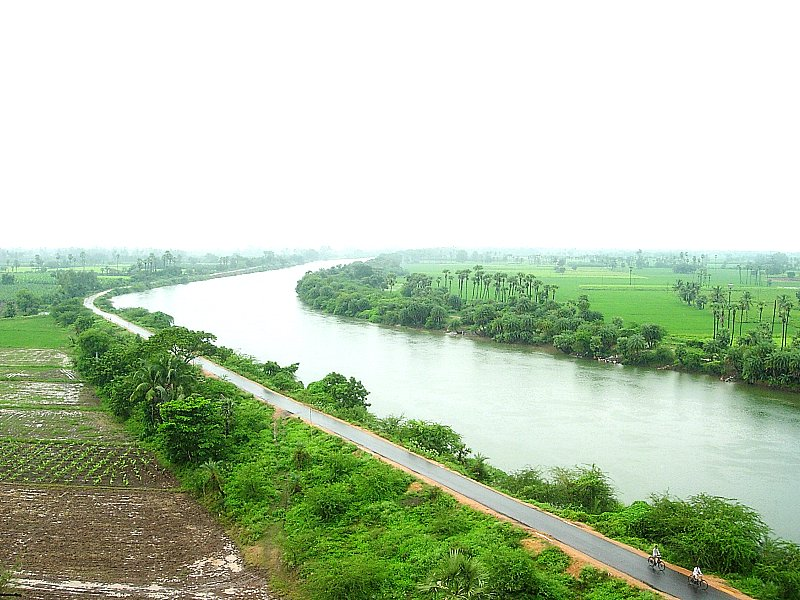
- Mellempudi village

- Location in Andhra Pradesh, India Mellempudi (India)
- Country: India
- State: Andhra Pradesh
- District: Guntur
- Founder: Government of Andhra Pradesh
- Named for: Agriculture

Government
  - Type: Parliamentary System
  - Body: Government of Andhra Pradesh

Languages
  - Official: Telugu
- Time zone: UTC+5:30 (IST)
- Postal code: 522303

Mellempudi is a village or gram panchayat in Tadepalle mandal, Guntur district, Andhra Pradesh, India which is part of Mangalagiri Tadepalle Municipal Corporation with the postal identification number 522303. The nearest landmarks of this village includes the KL University.

== History ==
Initially, this village is merged into Tadepalle Municipality along with other eight-gram panchayats — Undavalli, Penumaka, Prathuru, Vaddeswaram, Ippatam, Mellempudi, Chirravuru, and Gundemeda. Government of Andhra Pradesh has issued an order MS 97 issued on 6 February 2020 by Municipal Administration and Urban Development Department, Andhra Pradesh (MUDA).

Tadepalli Municipality was formed in 2009. In January 2021, the Municipal Administration and Urban Development Department issued an order notifying the merger of ten-gram panchayats — Undavalli, Penumaka, Prathuru, Vaddeswaram, Ippatam, Mellempudi, Chirravuru, Kunchanapalli, Kolanukonda and Gundemeda of Tadepalli mandal with Tadepalli Municipality.

In line to develop the Mangalagiri and Tadepalli as model towns, on 23 March 2021, Government of Andhra Pradesh merged Mangalagiri Municipality and Tadepalli Municipality to form Mangalagiri Tadepalli Municipal Corporation.
