= List of cities in Andhra Pradesh by population =

This article is about the list of most populated cities in Andhra Pradesh state of India as per the 2011 Census of India, conducted by the Office of the Registrar General and Census Commissioner, under Ministry of Home Affairs, Government of India.

== Cities statistics ==
As per the 2011 Census of India, towns with population of 100,000 and above are called "cities".

Visakhapatnam is the most populated city, with a population of 2,278,000 after the merger of surrounding towns into Visakhapatnam Municipal Corporation (VMC) and it being upgraded to Greater Visakhapatnam Municipal Corporation (GVMC). There have been proposals to merge some nearby villages to Vijayawada, Kakinada, and Rajamahendravaram Municipal Corporations.

Visakhapatnam, Kakinada, and Tirupati are being developed as smart cities by Government of India under Smart Cities Mission.

In 2021 Managaliri and Tadepalli Municipalities and villages in mandals were merged to form Mangalagiri-Tadepalli.

The cities written in bold are the headquarters of their respective district.

S.no.	City	District	Population 2011 Census	Population 2001 Census	Municipality formation	Number of wards
1	**Visakhapatnam**	**Visakhapatnam**	1,728,128	1,345,938	1865	98
2	**Vijayawada**	**NTR**	1,034,358	900,061	1888	64
3	**Guntur**	**Guntur**	743,354	514,461	1866	57
4	**Nellore**	**SPSR Nellore**	547,621	404,775	1866	54
5	**Kurnool**	**Kurnool**	457,633	269,122	1866	52
6	**Kakinada**	**Kakinada**	384,128	335,299	1866	50
7	**Rajamahendravaram**	**East Godavari**	376,333	374,721	1865	50
8	**Kadapa**	**YSR**	344,893	148,039	1868	50
9	Mangalagiri-Tadepalli	Guntur	315,323	244,990	2021	50
10	**Tirupati**	**Tirupati**	295,323	244,990	1886	50
11	**Anantapuram**	**Anantapuram**	267,161	243,143	1869	50
12	**Vizianagaram**	**Vizianagaram**	228,720	176,023	1888	50
13	**Ongole**	**Prakasam**	228,629	153,829	1876	50
14	**Eluru**	**Eluru**	218,020	215,804	1866	50
15	Proddatur	YSR	217,895	150,309	1915	41
16	**Nandyal**	**Nandyal**	211,424	154,324	1899	42
17	Adoni	Kurnool	184,625	146,458	1865	42
18	Madanapalle	Annamayya	180,180	107,449	1961	35
19	**Machilipatnam**	**Krishna**	169,892	179,353	1866	50
20	Tenali	Guntur	164,937	153,756	1912	40
21	**Chittoor**	**Chittoor**	160,722	152,654	1917	50
22	Hindupur	Sri Sathya Sai	151,677	125,074	1920	38
23	**Srikakulam**	**Srikakulam**	147,372	117,320	1856	50
24	**Bhimavaram**	**West Godavari**	146,961	142,064	1948	39
25	Tadepalligudem	West Godavari	130,348	102,622	1958	40
26	Guntakal	Anantapuram	126,270	117,103	1948	37
27	Dharmavaram	Sri Sathya Sai	121,874	103,357	1964	40
28	Gudivada	Krishna	118,167	113,054	1937	39
29	**Narasaraopet**	**Palnadu**	117,489	95,349	1915	38
30	Kadiri	Sri Sathya Sai	110,512	89,235	1963	36
31	Tadipatri	Anantapuram	108,421	86,843	1920	36
32	Chilakaluripet	Palnadu	101,398	91,656	1964	38

This is a 2011 population census of M / M.Corp + O.G.of cities. (M - Municipality, M.Corp - Municipal corporation, O.G. - Out growth)

- Kurnool includes Kallur Village which was merged into Kurnool Municipal Corporation.
- Guntur includes ten villages, namely Adavitakkellapadu, Ankireddypalem, Gorantla, Chowdavaram, Etukuru, Nallapadu, Pedakakani, Pedapalakaluru, and Pothuru, which were merged into Guntur Municipal Corporation.

== See also ==
- List of urban agglomerations in Andhra Pradesh
- List of cities in India by population
- List of municipalities in Andhra Pradesh
