= Rachavetivaripalle =

Coordinates: 13.55°N 78.50°E

- Village
- Interactive map of Rachavetivaripalle
- Country: India
- State: Andhra Pradesh
- District: Annamayya
- Mandal: Nimmanapalle

Population (2011)
  - Total: 1,139

Languages
  - Official: Telugu
- Time zone: UTC+5:30 (IST)
- ISO 3166 code: ISO 3166-2:IN
- Vehicle registration: AP-03
- Headquarters: Annamayya
- Website: http://www.chittoor.ap.gov.in/

Rachavetivaripalle is a village in Nimmanapalle mandal, Annamayya district, in the Indian state of Andhra Pradesh.

== Geography ==
It is located at an average elevation of 695 m (2,280 ft) above mean sea level.

=== Climate ===
Climate data for Rachavetivaripalle
Month	Jan	Feb	Mar	Apr	May	Jun	Jul	Aug	Sep	Oct	Nov	Dec	Year
Mean daily maximum °C (°F)	27.3 (81.1)	30.2 (86.4)	33.4 (92.1)	34.9 (94.8)	35 (95)	32.1 (89.8)	30.2 (86.4)	30.1 (86.2)	29.9 (85.8)	28.6 (83.5)	26.8 (80.2)	25.7 (78.3)	30.4 (86.6)
Mean daily minimum °C (°F)	15.5 (59.9)	16.8 (62.2)	19.4 (66.9)	22.2 (72.0)	23.6 (74.5)	22.8 (73.0)	21.8 (71.2)	21.8 (71.2)	21.2 (70.2)	20.2 (68.4)	17.8 (64.0)	15.6 (60.1)	19.9 (67.8)
Average precipitation mm (inches)	4 (0.2)	2 (0.1)	3 (0.1)	28 (1.1)	61 (2.4)	51 (2.0)	81 (3.2)	73 (2.9)	111 (4.4)	143 (5.6)	54 (2.1)	32 (1.3)	643 (25.4)

== See also ==
- List of cities in Andhra Pradesh by population
- List of municipalities in Andhra Pradesh
