= Academy of Medical Sciences (disambiguation) =

Academy of Medical Sciences may refer to:

- Academy of Medical Sciences (United Kingdom)
- Chinese Academy of Medical Sciences, Beijing, China
- Iranian Academy of Medical Sciences, Iran
- NRI Academy of Medical Sciences, Andhra Pradesh, India
- SUT Academy of Medical Sciences, Thiruvananthapuram, Kerala, India
- USSR Academy of Medical Sciences
- University of Medical Sciences and Technology, Khartoum, Sudan; also known as the Academy of Medical Sciences and Technology
