= Tadepalli mandal, Guntur district =

Tadepalli mandal
- Mandal
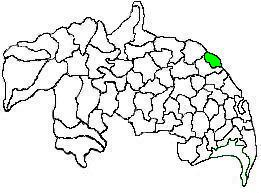
- Mandal map of Guntur district showing Tadepalli mandal (in green)
- Interactive Map Outlining mandal
- Location in Andhra Pradesh, India
- Coordinates: 16°28′49″N 80°37′07″E
- Country: India
- State: Andhra Pradesh
- District: Guntur
- Headquarters: Tadepalli

Government
  - Body: Mandal Parishad
  - Tehsildar: M.Sivaramakrishna

Area
  - Total: 61.76 km^{2} (23.85 sq mi)

Population (2011)
  - Total: 99,428
  - Density: 1,610/km^{2} (4,170/sq mi)

Languages
  - Official: Telugu
- Time zone: UTC+5:30 (IST)
- Vehicle registration: AP

Tadepalli mandal is one of the 18 mandals in Guntur district of the Indian state of Andhra Pradesh. It is under the administration of Tenali revenue division and the headquarters are located at Tadepalli town. The mandal is situated on the banks of Krishna River, bounded by Thullur and Mangalagiri mandals. from the mandal are under the jurisdiction of Andhra Pradesh Capital City.

== Demographics ==
As of 2011 census, the mandal had a population of 99,428. The total population constitute, 49,662 males and 49,766 females —a sex ratio of 1002 females per 1000 males. 10,456 children are in the age group of 0–6 years, of which 5,336 are boys and 5,120 are girls. The average literacy rate stands at 75.06% with 66,781 literates.

== Administration ==
The three villages namely, Undavalli, Penumaka, a portion of Tadepalli municipality covering Nulakapet, Dolas Nagar etc. forms part of the new Amaravati and the mandal is a part of Andhra Pradesh capital region, under the jurisdiction of APCRDA. The mandal is under the control of a tahsildar and the present tahsildar is M.Sivaramakrishna. Tadepalli mandals one of the 3 mandals under Mangalagiri (Assembly constituency), which in turn represents Guntur (Lok Sabha constituency) of Andhra Pradesh.

== Villages Lists ==
As of 2011 census, the mandal has 9 settlements, which includes 2 towns, 1 out growth and 6 villages. Tadepalli (M) and Vaddeswaram (CT) are the two towns and Undavalli (OG) is the out growth to Tadepalli (M). Tadepalli (OG) is fully included in Tadepalli (M), while Vaddeswaram village is included in Vaddeswaram (CT). Undavalli (Rural) is fully included in Undavalli (OG).

The settlements in the mandal are listed below:

1. Chirravuru
2. Gundimeda
3. Ippatam
4. Praturu
5. Kolanukonda
6. Kunchanapalli
7. Penumaka
8. Mellempudi
9. Mangalagiri Tadepalli Municipal Corporation (Corp)
10. Undavalli (OG)
11. Vaddeswaram (CT)

Notes
(M) denotes a Municipality
(CT) denotes a Census town
(Corp) denotes a Municipal Corporation
(OG) denotes an Out Growth

== Education ==
The mandal plays a major role in education for the rural students of the nearby villages. The primary and secondary school education is imparted by government, aided and private schools, under the School Education Department of the state. As per the school information report for the academic year 2015–16, the mandal has more than 11,466 students enrolled in over 71 schools.

== See also ==
- List of mandals in Andhra Pradesh
- Villages in Tadepalli mandal
