= Kunchanapalli =

Kunchanapalli, Guntur
- Interactive map of Kunchanapalli, Guntur
- Location in Andhra Pradesh, India
- Coordinates: 16°27′46″N 80°37′05″E
- Country: India
- State: Andhra Pradesh
- District: Guntur
- Mandal: Tadepalle

Government
  - Body: Mangalagiri Tadepalli Municipal Corporation

Area
  - Total: 319 ha (790 acres)

Population (2011)
  - Total: 5,673
  - Density: 1,780/km^{2} (4,610/sq mi)

Languages
  - Official: Telugu
- Time zone: UTC+5:30 (IST)
- PIN: 522xxx
- Area code: +91–8640
- Vehicle registration: AP

Kunchanapalli is a Southern suburb of Vijayawada in the Indian state of Andhra Pradesh. part of Mangalagiri Tadepalle Municipal Corporation part of Guntur revenue division.

== Geography ==
Kunchanapalli is located at 16.4500°N 80.6167°E. It has an average elevation of 5 meters (19 feet).

== Government and politics ==
Kunchanapalli gram panchayat is the local self-government of the village. It is divided into wards and each ward is represented by a ward member. The ward members are headed by a Sarpanch. The village forms a part of Andhra Pradesh Capital Region and is under the jurisdiction of APCRDA.

== See also ==
- List of villages in Guntur district
