= Kavali =

Kavali Kanakapatnam
- Town
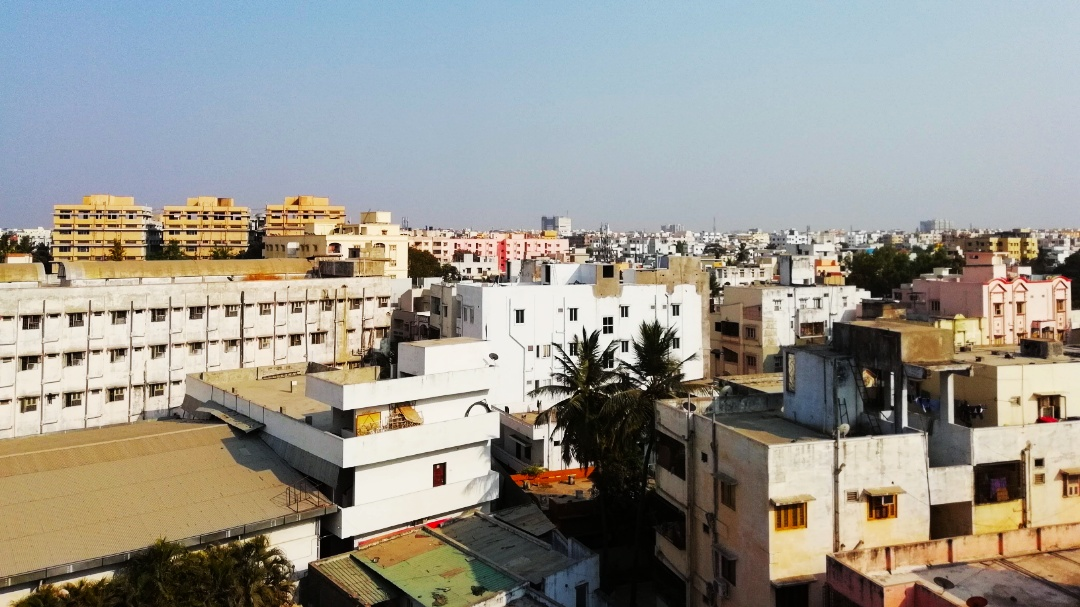
- Kavali aerial view

- Location in Andhra Pradesh, India
- Coordinates: 14.913001°N 79.992921°E
- Country: India
- State: Andhra Pradesh
- District: Nellore district

Government
  - Type: Municipal Council
  - Body: Kavali Municipal Council
  - Chairman: Vacant
  - Deputy Chairman: Vacant
  - MLA: DAGUMATI VENKATA KRISHNA REDDY (TDP)
  - MP: PRABHAKAR REDDY VEMIREDDY

Area
  - Total: 22.95 km^{2} (8.86 sq mi)
- Elevation: 20 m (66 ft)

Population (2011)
  - Total: 90,099
  - Rank: 4th (Towns in AP)
  - Density: 3,926/km^{2} (10,170/sq mi)

Languages
  - Official: Telugu
- Time zone: UTC+5:30 (IST)
- PIN: 524201,02,03
- Vehicle registration: AP-39
- Website: https://cdma.ap.gov.in/en/kavali-municipality

Kavali is a town in Nellore district of Andhra Pradesh of India. It also serves as headquarters of Kavali mandal and Kavali revenue division.It is one of the few cities from Andhra Pradesh which were selected for Atal Mission for Rejuvenation and Urban Transformation (AMRUT) Scheme. and the distance from Nellore is 54 km.

== Etymology ==
In Telugu, kāvali means protection/security. The name arises from the fact that in 1515, the king of Udayagiri, Harihara Rayulu stationed his army at this town.

== Geography ==
Kavali is located at 14.913001°N 79.992921°E. It has an average elevation of 17 metres (56 ft). The town is at a distance of 8 km from the Bay of Bengal.

== Demographics ==
As of the 2011 Census of India, the town had a population of 90,099. The total population is 75,206 males, 75,127 females and children (in the age group of 0–6 years). The average literacy rate stands at 81.09% with 60,497 literates, significantly higher than the national average of 73.00%.

== Governance ==
Civic administration

Kavali Municipal Council is the seat of local government which administers Kavali town.

== Education ==
As per the school information report for the academic year 2018–19, the town has a total of 57 schools. These include 34 private, 2 ZPHS and 21 municipal schools.

VSU PG Study Centre and Jawahar Bharati College is located in Kavali. 3 engineering colleges are present in the town.

== Climate ==
Climate data for Kavali (1995–2020, extremes 1995–2020)
Month	Jan	Feb	Mar	Apr	May	Jun	Jul	Aug	Sep	Oct	Nov	Dec	Year
Record high °C (°F)	34.5 (94.1)	38.2 (100.8)	40.8 (105.4)	44.3 (111.7)	47.2 (117.0)	45.2 (113.4)	41.0 (105.8)	39.5 (103.1)	40.1 (104.2)	38.6 (101.5)	36.3 (97.3)	34.0 (93.2)	47.2 (117.0)
Mean daily maximum °C (°F)	29.8 (85.6)	31.6 (88.9)	34.2 (93.6)	36.5 (97.7)	39.4 (102.9)	37.8 (100.0)	35.6 (96.1)	34.9 (94.8)	34.5 (94.1)	32.7 (90.9)	30.7 (87.3)	29.5 (85.1)	33.9 (93.0)
Mean daily minimum °C (°F)	20.5 (68.9)	21.7 (71.1)	23.9 (75.0)	26.3 (79.3)	28.4 (83.1)	28.3 (82.9)	27.0 (80.6)	26.5 (79.7)	26.0 (78.8)	25.0 (77.0)	23.1 (73.6)	21.2 (70.2)	24.8 (76.6)
Record low °C (°F)	16.2 (61.2)	16.6 (61.9)	19.0 (66.2)	20.4 (68.7)	21.6 (70.9)	21.3 (70.3)	21.3 (70.3)	22.3 (72.1)	21.8 (71.2)	19.5 (67.1)	18.0 (64.4)	17.0 (62.6)	16.2 (61.2)
Average rainfall mm (inches)	34.9 (1.37)	21.1 (0.83)	6.2 (0.24)	13.4 (0.53)	56.1 (2.21)	56.0 (2.20)	77.0 (3.03)	100.0 (3.94)	113.1 (4.45)	300.0 (11.81)	284.2 (11.19)	82.3 (3.24)	1,144.2 (45.05)
Average rainy days	1.0	0.9	0.3	0.7	1.6	3.8	5.3	6.6	6.4	8.8	8.3	3.5	47.1
Average relative humidity (%) (at 17:30 IST)	68	65	66	68	56	48	53	55	62	70	72	71	63
Source: India Meteorological Department

== Transport ==
=== Roadways ===
National Highway 16, a part of Golden Quadrilateral highway network, bypasses the town. National Highway 167BG which starts at National Highway 167B near Seetharamapuram village in Nellore district ends at kavali.

=== Railways ===
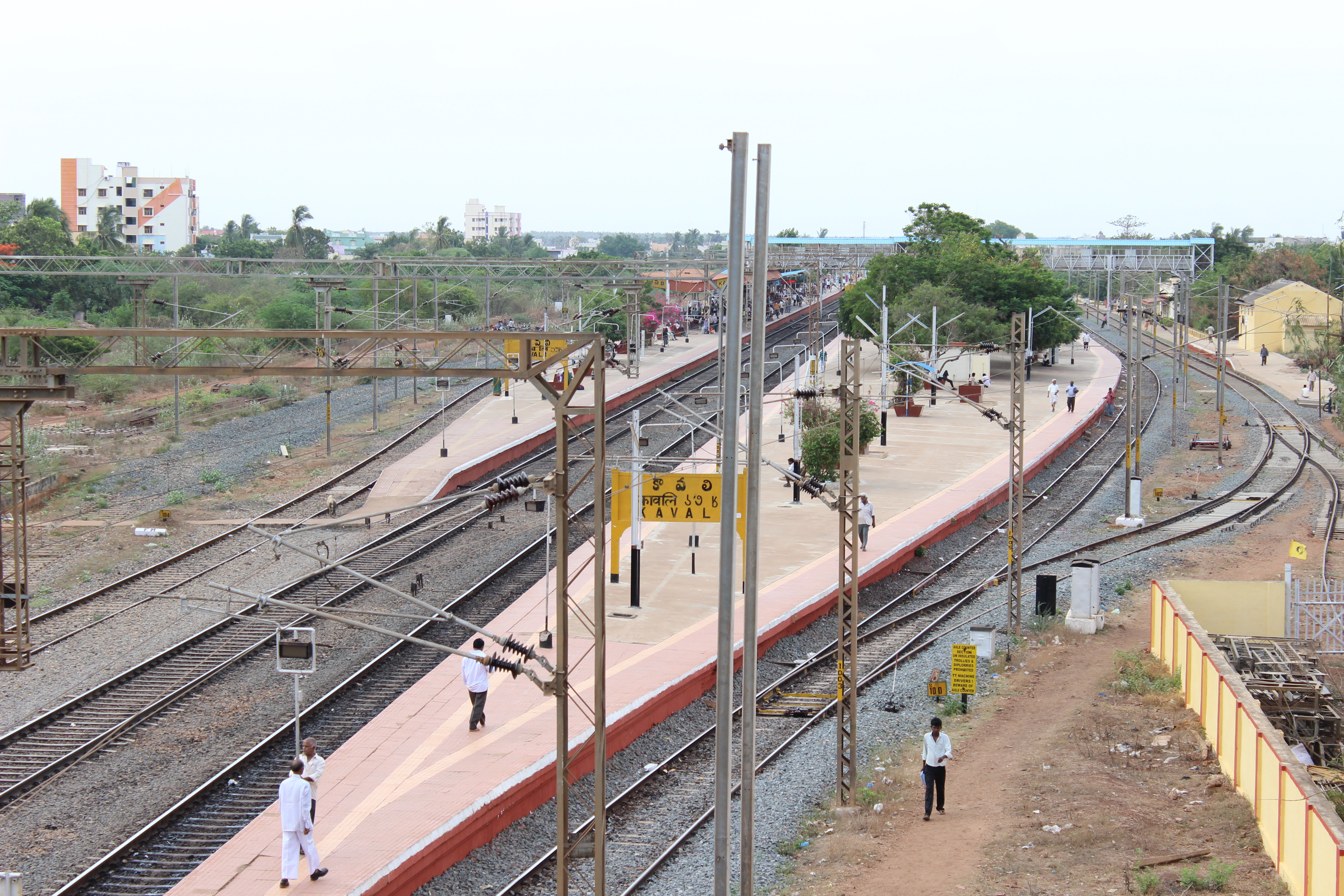
Kavali railway station

Kavali railway station is located on the Howrah–Chennai main line. It is classified as a B–category station in the Vijayawada railway division of South Central Railway zone. The Andhra Pradesh State Road Transport Corporation operates bus services from Kavali bus station. The nearest planned upcoming sea port is Ramayapatnam port which is at a distance of 20 km from the town.

=== Air ===
The nearest airport is under construction at Damavaram which is 30 km from the town.

== See also ==
- List of towns in Andhra Pradesh
- List of municipalities in Andhra Pradesh
