= KAQ =

KAQ or kaq may refer to:

- Kolanukonda railway station (Station code: KAQ), a railway station in Andhra Pradesh, India
- Tapiche Capanahua language (ISO 639-3: kaq), a Panoan language spoken in Peru and Brazil
