= Penumaka =

- Village
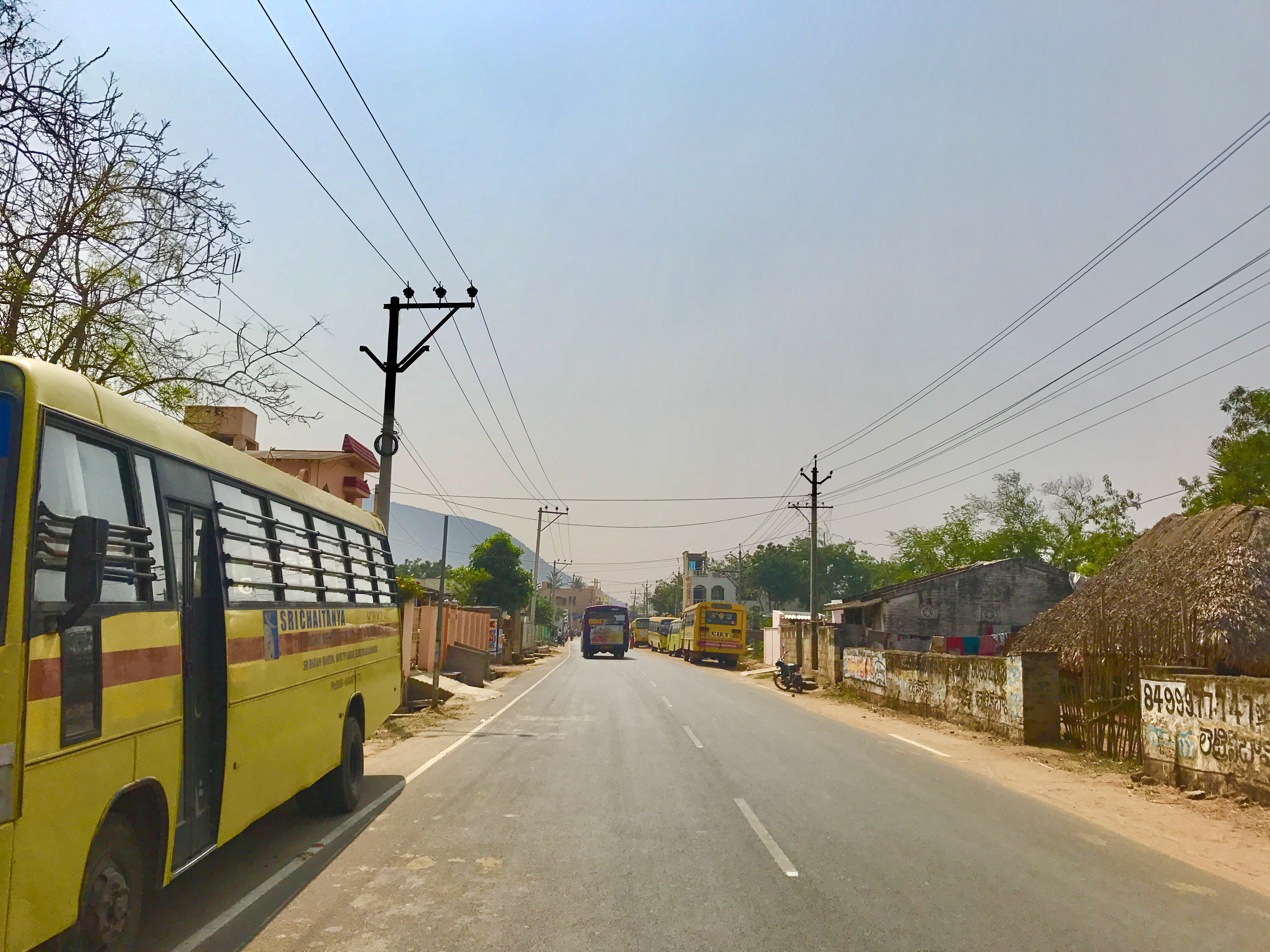
- Penumaka main road

- Location in Andhra Pradesh, India
- Coordinates: 16.4832°N 80.5749°E
- Country: India
- State: Andhra Pradesh
- District: Guntur
- Mandal: Tadepalle

Government
  - Type: Panchayati raj
  - Body: Penumaka gram panchayat

Area
  - Total: 884 ha (2,180 acres)

Population (2011)
  - Total: 7,918
  - Density: 896/km^{2} (2,320/sq mi)

Languages
  - Official: Telugu
- Time zone: UTC+5:30 (IST)
- PIN: 522xxx
- Area code: +91–8640
- Vehicle registration: AP

Penumaka is a part of Mangalagiri Tadepalle Municipal Corporation part of Guntur district which is part of Andhra Pradesh. It was a village in Tadepalle mandal of Guntur district, prior to its de–notification as gram panchayat.

== Demographics ==
At the 2011 Census of India, the town had a population of 7,918 (3,997 males and 3,921 females). The population under 6 years of age was 790. The average literacy rate was 71.11%.

== Government and politics ==
Penumaka gram panchayat is the local self-government of the village. It is divided into wards and each ward is represented by a ward member. The ward members are headed by a Sarpanch. The village forms a part of capital city, Andhra Pradesh Capital Region and is under the jurisdiction of APCRDA.

== Transport ==
Penumaka is located on the Vijayawada-Amaravati road. APSRTC operates buses on this route from Pandit Nehru bus station in Vijayawada.

== See also ==
- List of villages in Guntur district
