= Kolanukonda =

- Village
- Interactive map of Kolanukonda
- Location in Andhra Pradesh, India
- Coordinates: 16.4500°N 80.6000°E
- Country: India
- State: Andhra Pradesh
- District: Guntur
- Mandal: Tadepalle

Government
  - Type: Panchayati raj
  - Body: Kolanukonda gram panchayat

Area
  - Total: 290 ha (720 acres)

Population (2011)
  - Total: 4,264
  - Density: 1,500/km^{2} (3,800/sq mi)

Languages
  - Official: Telugu
- Time zone: UTC+5:30 (IST)
- PIN: 522502
- Area code: +91–8645
- Vehicle registration: AP

Kolanukonda is a suburb of Vijayawada in Guntur district of the Indian state of Andhra Pradesh. It is located in Tadepalle mandal part of Mangalagiri Tadepalle Municipal Corporation part of Guntur revenue division. There is a historical temple on the hill here. It is a Shiva temple and kodanda ramalayam and malchaamma and Zenda chettu and Peerla panja

== Geography ==
Kolanukonda is located at 16.4500°N 80.6000°E.

== Demographics ==
As of 2011 Census of India, Kolanukonda had a population of 3,164. The total population constitute, 1,580 males and 1,584 females —a sex ratio of 1003 females per 1000 males. 427 children are in the age group of 0–6 years, of which 205 are boys and 222 are girls —a ratio of 979 per 1000. The average literacy rate stands at 67.96% with 1,860 literates, approximately equal to the state average of 67.41%.

== Government and politics ==
Kolanukonda gram panchayat is the local self-government of the village. It is divided into wards and each ward is represented by a ward member. The ward members are headed by a Sarpanch. The village forms a part of Andhra Pradesh Capital Region and is under the jurisdiction of APCRDA.

== Transport ==
Kolanukonda railway station is located on Howrah-Chennai main line and administered under Vijayawada railway division of South Central Railways.

== See also ==
- List of villages in Guntur district
