= Board of Intermediate Education, Andhra Pradesh =

Educational organisation in India

- Formation: 1971
- Type: Board of Intermediate Education
- Headquarters: Tadepalli, Guntur, Andhra Pradesh, India
- Official language: Telugu, English, Hindi and Urdu
- Website: Andhra Pradesh Board of Intermediate Education

The Board of Intermediate Education, Andhra Pradesh (BIEAP) is a board of education in Andhra Pradesh, India. Established in 1971, it was located in Hyderabad, situated in the composite Andhra Pradesh state. The board is now located in Tadepalli after state reorganization in 2014. The board offers two-year courses in 85 streams and courses and conducts examinations.

== Academics ==
The Intermediate Education, also known as Higher Secondary Classes (HSC)/11th & 12th class is a two-year course conducted by the Andhra Pradesh Board of Intermediate Education. Is one of State secondary education boards of India. The board currently offers 85 streams and courses.

BIEAP offers general and vocational groups. General groups include Science, Humanities, and Commerce studies. In these groups, students learn theory and practice. That helps them to choose and pursue higher studies at the graduate level in both professional and general courses. Vocational groups are meant to educate students and train skills related to their branch of study. It will help them to get immediate self-employment or continue higher education.

Every student in BIE studies their subjects and receives practical training. They are also working towards environmental improvement, learning ethics and moral values to become a responsible, committed, and patriotic citizen of their country. The aim is to make them the "Nation's Potential Human Resource".

== Examinations ==
Intermediate public examinations in Andhra Pradesh include three different phases:

1. Examinations of social and environmental responsibility: taken by every Intermediate student. Along with project works, these tests are mandatory for every student to get qualified. They include the following subject areas: Ethics and Human Values, Environmental Education.
2. Practical examinations: for Science and Vocational group students.
3. Theory examinations" for all students in their related subjects.

BIEAP conducts examinations for the 1st and 2nd year in March annually. Each year more than a million students appear for both Intermediate Junior and Senior Exams. The results are announced in April.

APBIE uses a 1000 mark strategy which means it is divided into two exams

1st year 500 marks. And 2nd year 500 marks which fully combined at the end of 2nd year
