= Vaddeswaram =

- Census Town
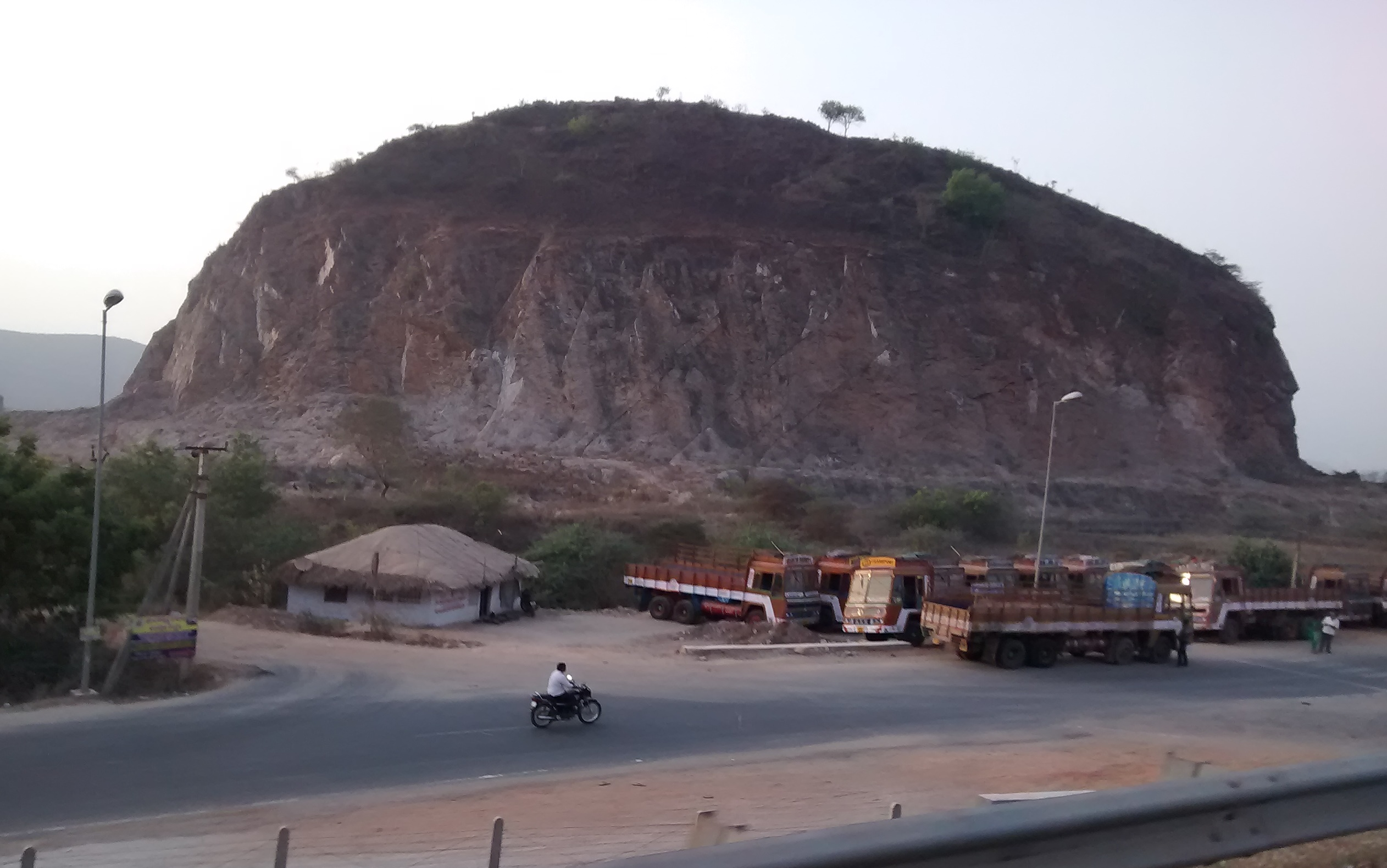
- Vaddeswaram Quary

- Location within Andhra Pradesh Location within India
- Coordinates: 16°26′50″N 80°36′42″E
- Country: India
- State: Andhra Pradesh
- District: Guntur
- Mandal: Tadepalli

Government
  - Body: Mangalagiri Tadepalli Municipal Corporation

Area
  - Total: 3.30 km^{2} (1.27 sq mi)
- Elevation: 21 m (69 ft)

Population (2011)
  - Total: 6,275
  - Density: 1,900/km^{2} (4,920/sq mi)
- Time zone: UTC+5:30 (IST)
- Telephone code: +91-
- Vehicle registration: AP
- Official language: Telugu

Vaddeswaram is a Suburb of Vijayawada in Guntur district of the Indian state of Andhra Pradesh. It is located at a distance of 5 km (3.1 mi) from Krishna River, in Tadepalle mandal part of Mangalagiri Tadepalle Municipal Corporation part of Guntur revenue division.

== Demographics ==
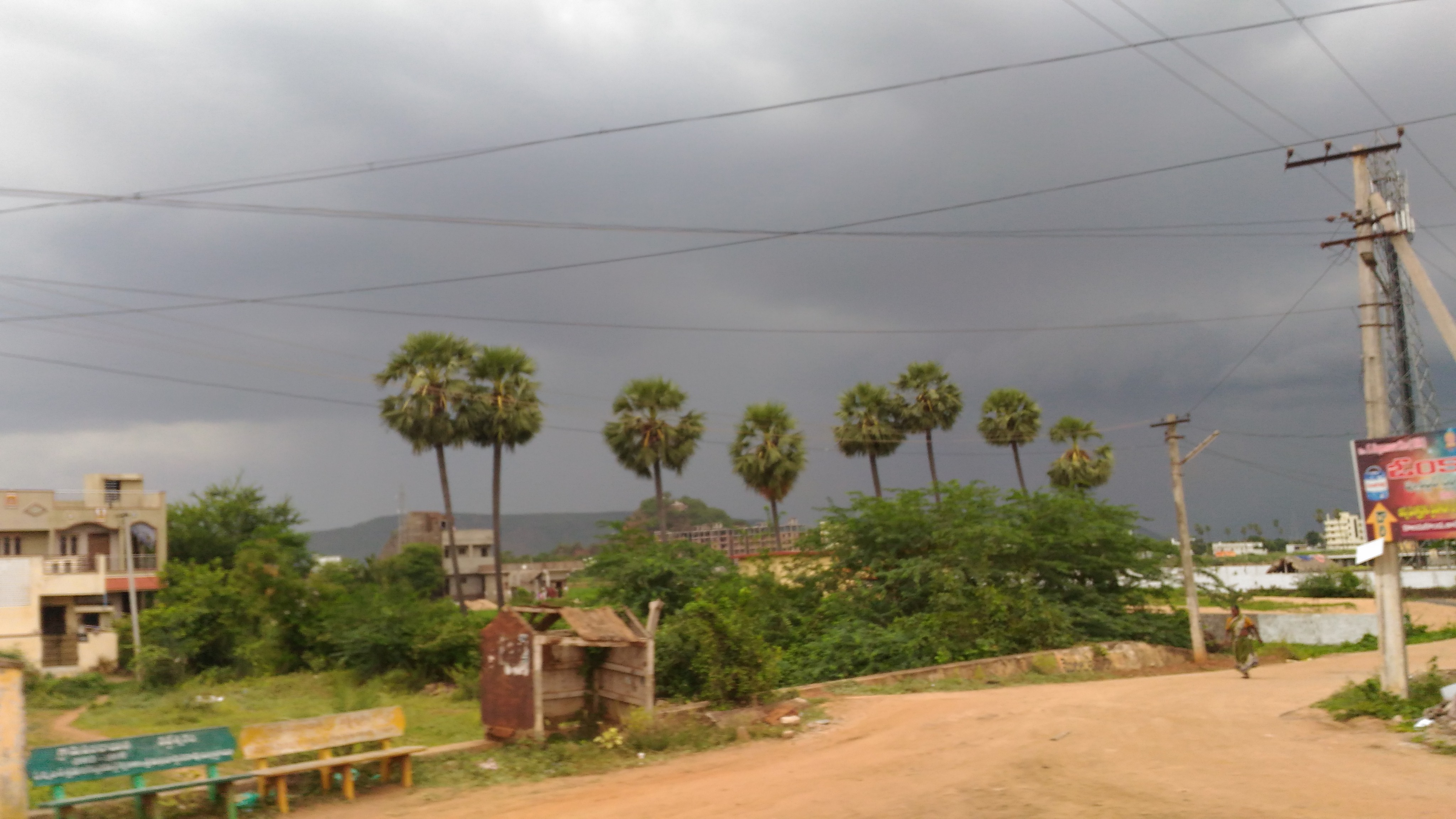
Vaddeswaram village entrance

As of 2011 census, the town had a population of 6,275. The total population consists of 3,087 males and 3,188 females —a sex ratio of 1033 females per 1000 males. 598 children are in the age group of 0–6 years, of which 287 are boys and 311 are girls. The average literacy rate stands at 70.32% with 3,992 literates, relatively higher than the state average of 67.41%.

== Transport ==
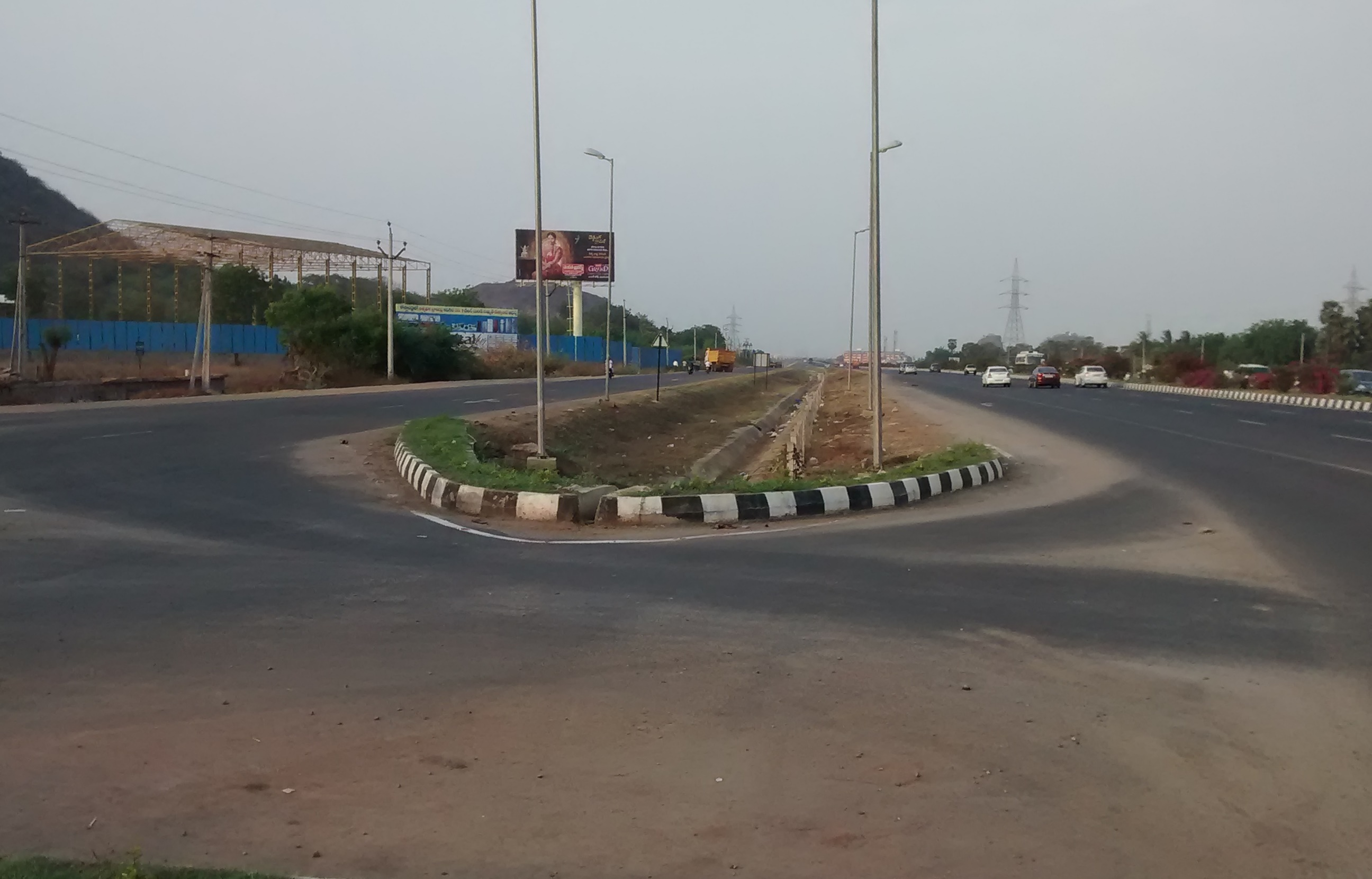
National Highway 16 at Vaddeswaram

Kolanukonda railway station serves Vaddeswaram with rail facility. It is situated on Howrah-Chennai main line and is administered under Vijayawada railway division of South Central Railways.

== Education ==
The primary and secondary school education is imparted by government, aided and private schools, under the School Education Department of the state. KL University is a deemed university located in this town.

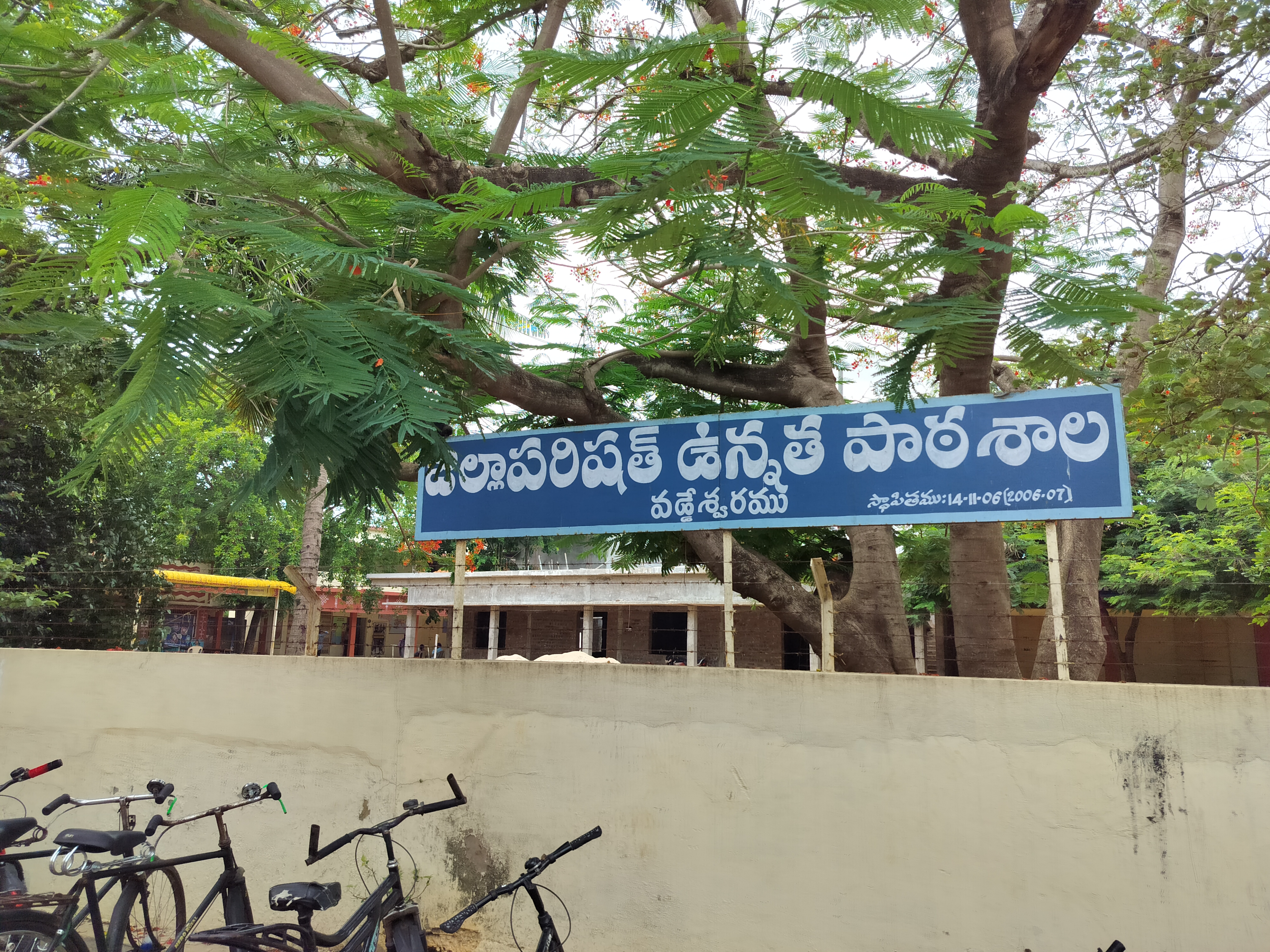
Board of Zilla Parishad high school

== Government Buildings ==
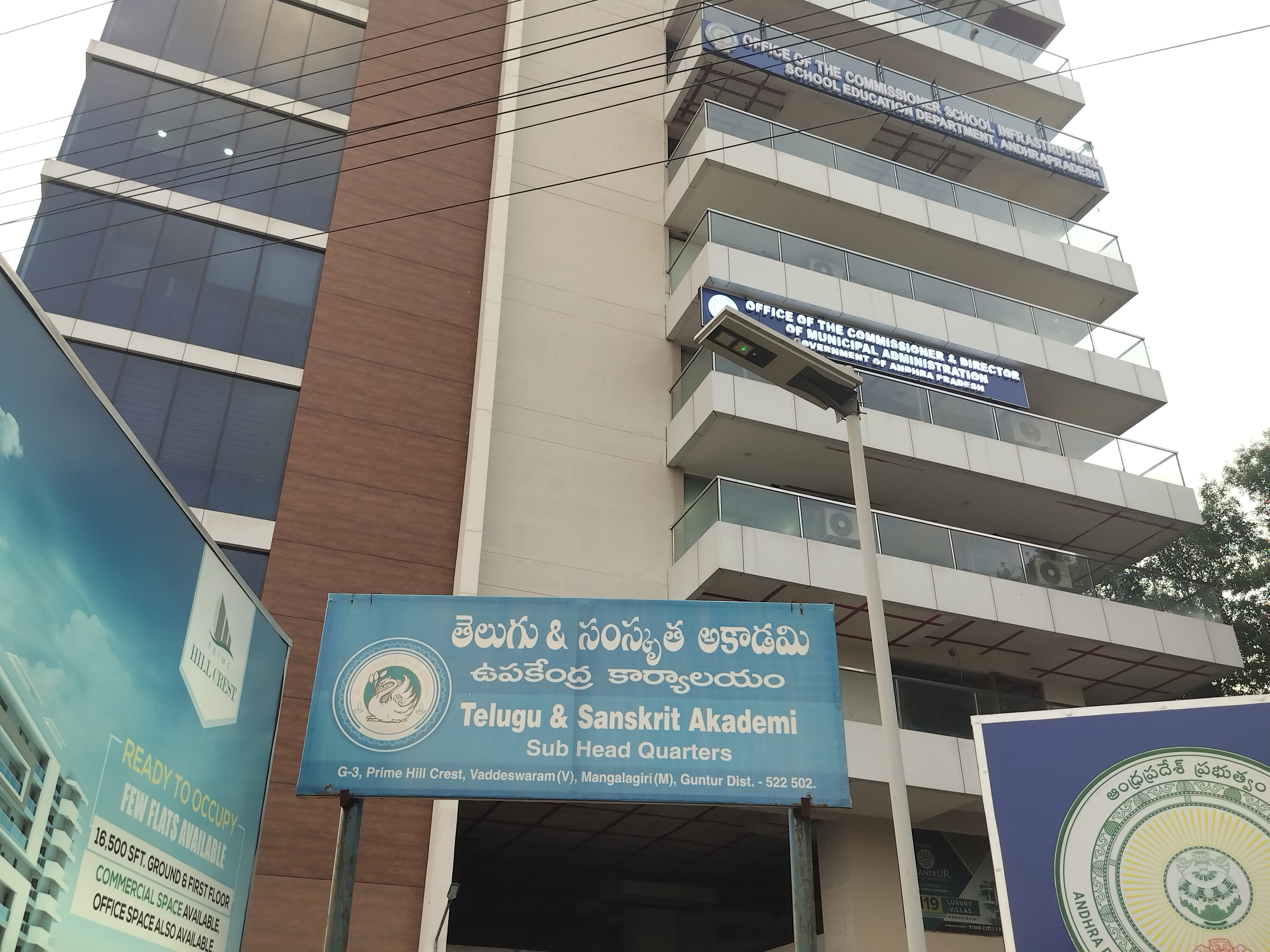
Board of Telugu& Sanskrit Akademi Sub headquarters

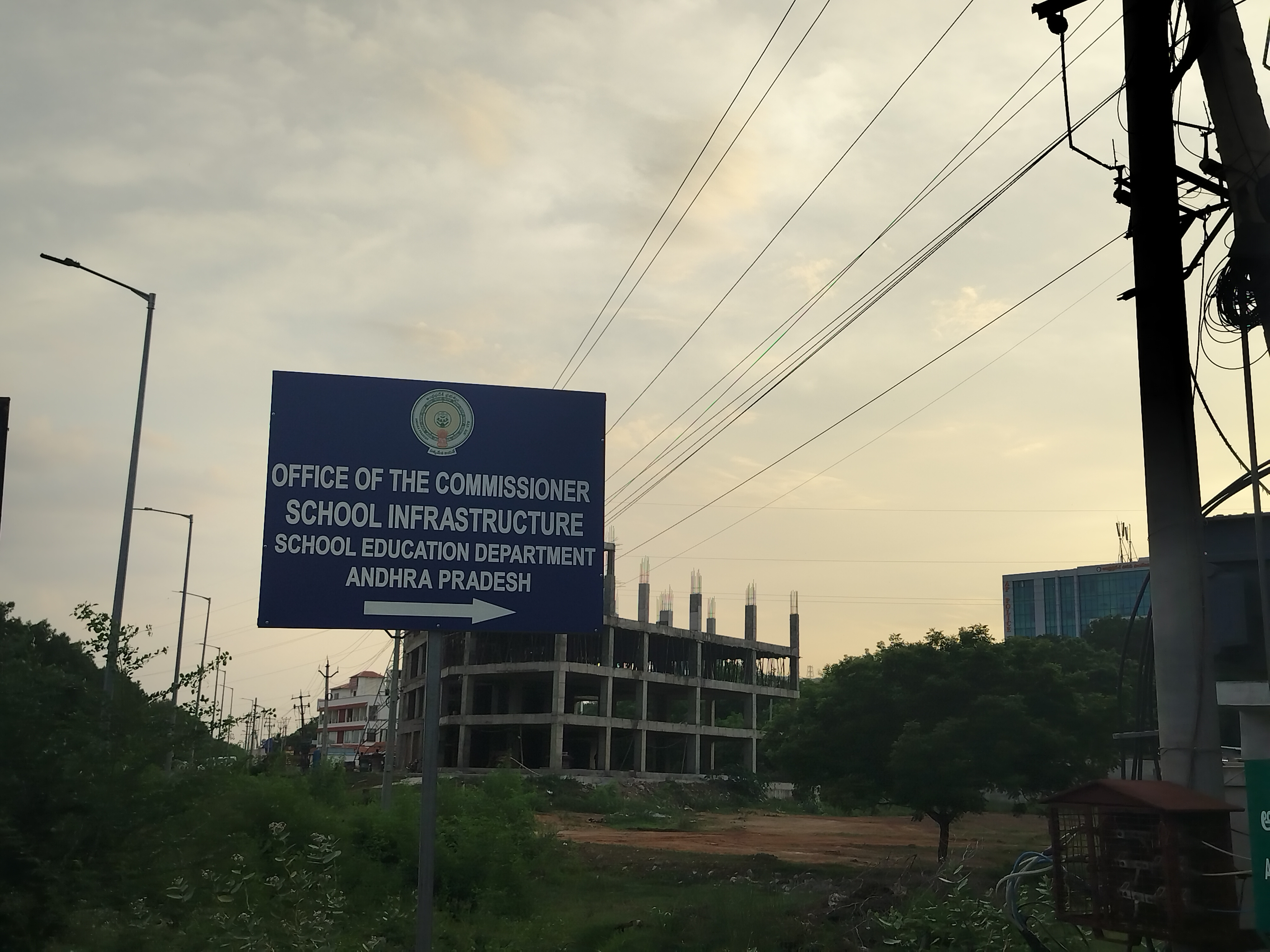
Board of office of the commissioner school infrastructure school education department

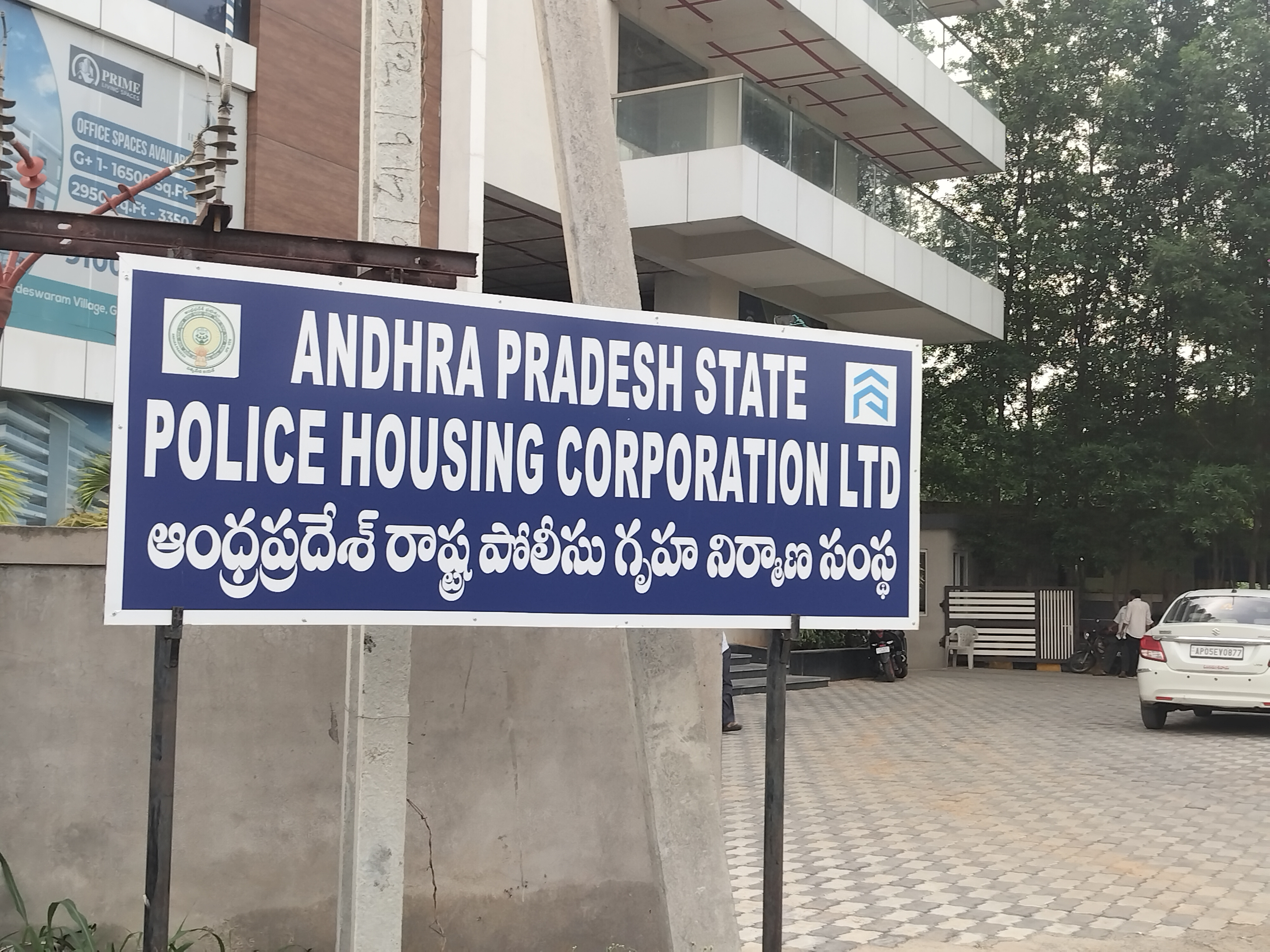
Board of Andhrapradesh state police housing corporation ltd

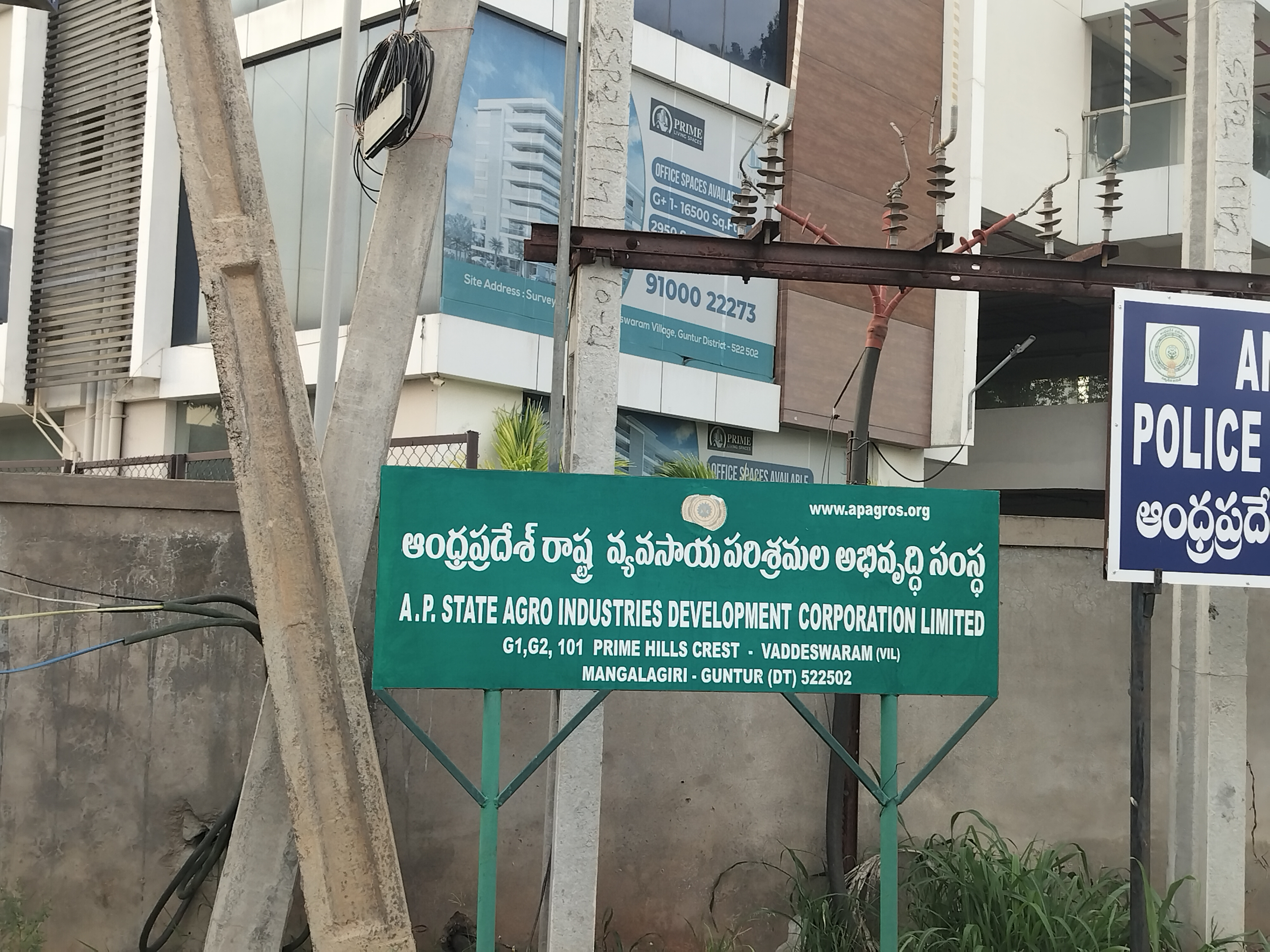
Board of A.P. state agro industries development corporation limited

== See also ==
- List of census towns in Andhra Pradesh
