= Mangalagiri Municipality =

- Formation: 1969
- Dissolved: 2021
- Merger of: Municipal Corporation
- Purpose: Civic administration
- Headquarters: Mangalagiri
- Location: Mangalagiri, Guntur district, Andhra Pradesh, India
- Official language: Telugu
- Main organ: Committee
- Website: cdma.ap.gov.in/MANGALAGIRI/

Mangalagiri Municipality is a former municipality in Guntur district of the Indian state of Andhra Pradesh. A new corporation called Mangalagiri Tadepalli Municipal Corporation was formed for both Mangalagiri, Tadepalle towns as a new city on 23 March 2021.

== Administration ==
The municipality was established in the year 1969 and has an extent of 17.53 km^{2} (6.77 mi^{2}). Mangalagiri municipality and its outgrowths of Navuluru and Atmakur are a part of Vijayawada urban agglomeration. In March 2021 Mangalagiri Municipality and Tadepalli Municipality are merged and formed Mangalagiri Tadepalli Municipal Corporation.

The Elected Wing of the municipality consists of a municipal council, which has elected members and is headed by a Chairperson. Whereas, the Executive Wing is headed by a municipal commissioner.

Mangalagiri municipality has a total of 32 election wards. The below table shows the composition of municipal wards with unreserved and reserved (women, SC's, ST's and BC's) categories. AP government introduced new GO to merge Atmakuru, Nowluru, Bethapudi, Yerrabalem and Chinakakani in Mangalagiri Municipality.

== Civic works and services ==
The municipality works on improving civic needs such as, sewerage, storm water drains, solid waste management, and it even takes care of laying cement roads, providing drinking water, internal road widening etc. The municipality also takes up the process of beautification, which certain works like, tree plantations, maintaining parks, laying dividers and pavements.

The town has a water pumping station, which draws water from the nearby Prakasam Barrage and is supplied to the filtration plants for water supply.

Projects

Mangalagiri is one of the seven municipalities, along with Vijayawada and Guntur Municipal Corporations to be a part of a 15 MW waste-to-energy plant project. It is planned to be set up with the collaboration of the JITF Urban Infrastructure Limited.

== Awards and achievements ==
In 2015, the municipality received Green Leaf Awards 2015 in the category of Best Municipality, which was organised by NGO Sukuki Exnora. The city is one among the 31 cities in the state to be a part of water supply and sewerage services mission known as Atal Mission for Rejuvenation and Urban Transformation (AMRUT).

== See also ==
- List of municipalities in Andhra Pradesh
