= National Assessment and Accreditation Council =

Organization that assesses and accredits institutions of higher education in India

- NAAC logo

Agency overview
- Formed: 1994; 32 years ago
- Jurisdiction: India
- Headquarters: Bengaluru, Karnataka, India
- Motto: Excellence • Credibility • Relevance
- Agency executive: Anil Sahasrabudhe, Director
- Parent department: Ministry of Education
- Parent agency: UGC
- Website: www.naac.gov.in

The National Assessment and Accreditation Council (NAAC) is a public autonomous body of the government of India that assesses and accredits higher education institutions (HEIs) in India. It is funded by the University Grants Commission and headquartered in Bengaluru.

== History ==
NAAC was established in 1994 in response to recommendations of National Policy on Education (1986). This policy was to "address the issues of deterioration in quality of education", and the Programme of Action (POA-1992) laid out strategic plans for the policies including the establishment of an independent national accreditation body. Consequently, the NAAC was established in 1994 with its headquarters at Bengaluru.

== Grading ==
The NAAC assesses institutes on an eight-grade scale based on the scores of cumulative grade point average (CGPA):

Range of institutional CGPA	Letter Grade	Performance Descriptor
3.51 – 4.00	A++	Accredited
3.26 – 3.50	A+	Accredited
3.01 – 3.25	A	Accredited
2.76 – 3.00	B++	Accredited
2.51 – 2.75	B+	Accredited
2.01 – 2.50	B	Accredited
1.51 – 2.00	C	Accredited
≤ 1.50	D	Not Accredited

== Accreditations ==
As of June 2023, 820 universities and 15501 colleges were accredited by NAAC. The process of NAAC is done by colleges and universities with the help of internal quality assurance cell. In 2023, the NAAC announced plans to overhaul its accreditation framework by introducing a more data-driven approach, emphasizing institutional outcomes and global benchmarking. As of 2024, NAAC has accredited over 450 universities and 8,500 colleges across India.

=== Results ===
NAAC published a consolidated list of higher education institutions with valid accreditation as of 11 March 2020. The outcome of the recent cycles of accreditation process is tabulated below.

Accredited Universities—Top Ranked
University	State	CGPA	Accreditation Valid up to
Tata Institute of Social Sciences	Maharashtra	3.89	18/02/2023
Lakshmibai National Institute of Physical Education	Madhya Pradesh	3.79	27/03/2022
Institute of Chemical Technology	Maharashtra	3.77	26/11/2022
Amrita Vishwa Vidyapeetham	Tamil Nadu	3.70	16/08/2028
Indian Institute of Science	Karnataka	3.67	25/09/2023
Ramakrishna Mission Vivekananda Educational and Research Institute	West Bengal	3.66	27/03/2024
Mumbai University	Maharashtra	3.65	27/03/2024
Alagappa University	Tamil Nadu	3.64	01/05/2024
Banasthali Vidyapith	Rajasthan	3.63	10/03/2022
Jamia Millia Islamia	Delhi	3.61	13/12/2026
Andhra University	Andhra Pradesh	3.6	18/02/2023
Savitribai Phule Pune University	Maharashtra	3.6	21/02/2024
University of Madras	Tamil Nadu	3.59	21/08/2028
Kristu Jayanti (Deemed to be ) University	Karnataka	3.78	20/12/2028

Accredited Colleges—Top Ranked
University	State	CGPA	Accreditation valid up to
Government Mohindra College	Punjab	3.86	18/02/2021
B.M.S. College of Engineering	Karnataka	3.83	27/03/2024
Subodh College	Rajasthan	3.82	29/10/2024
Sri Ramakrishna Mission Vidyalaya College of Education	Tamil Nadu	3.82	11/09/2022
New Arts, Commerce and Science College, Ahmednagar	Maharashtra	3.79	29/10/2022
KTHM College, Nashik	Maharashtra	3.79	29/10/2024
St. Joseph's College, Bengaluru	Karnataka	3.79	29/10/2024
St. Xavier's College, Kolkata	West Bengal	3.77	22/01/2024
Cotton College, Guwahati	Assam	3.76	04/11/2021
St. Joseph's College, Devagiri	Kerala	3.76	15/09/2023
Holy Cross College, Tiruchirappalli	Tamil Nadu	3.75	13/02/2027
Deogiri College, Aurangabad	Maharashtra	3.75	16/03/2021
VNR Vignana Jyothi Institute of Engineering and Technology	Telangana	3.73	15/08/2023
Loyola College of Social Sciences	Kerala	3.72	09/12/2021
Marian College Kuttikkanam Autonomous	Kerala	3.71	31/12/2030
St. Ann’s College of Education, Mangaluru	Karnataka	3.71	09/12/2021

== Controversies ==
In February 2025, the Central Bureau of Investigation arrested the chairman and six other members of a NAAC inspection committee, along with individuals from the Guntur‑based Koneru Lakshmaiah Education Foundation, after uncovering a bribery scheme in which assessors allegedly received cash, gold, laptops, and mobile phones in exchange for favorable A++ accreditation ratings for multiple higher‑education institutions. Raids conducted across 20 locations including Chennai, Bengaluru, Sambalpur, and New Delhi; led to seizures of approximately ₹3,700,000 (US$38,000) and electronic items. In response, NAAC debarred the accused assessors, suspended KLEF from applying for accreditation for five years, and initiated reviews of hundreds of recent assessments.
