= Kavali Municipality =

Local self-government in Kavali, Andhra Pradesh

Kavali Municipal Council

Type
- Type: Municipal council of the Kavali
- Established: 2012; 14 years ago

Leadership
- Municipal commissioner: B.Siva Reddy
- Seats: 40

Elections
- Voting system: First-past-the-post
- Last election: 2014
- Next election: 2022

Website
- cdma.ap.gov.in/en/kavali-municipality

Kavali Municipal Council is the local self-government in Kavali, a town in the Indian state of Andhra Pradesh. It is classified as a first grade municipality.

== Jurisdiction ==
The council is spread over an area of 48.39 km^{2} (18.68 sq mi).

== Administration ==
The municipality was constituted on 1 April 1967. It is spread over an area of 60.09 km^{2} (23.20 mi^{2}) and has 40 wards. The Elected Wing of the municipality consists of a municipal council, which has elected members and is headed by a Chairperson. Whereas, the Executive Wing is headed by a municipal commissioner. The present municipal commissioner of the town is B.Siva Reddy.

== List of Municipal Chairmans ==
No.	Name	Term	Party
1	N. Srinivas Kiran	2005-2010	Indian National Congress
2	P. Alekhya	2014-2019	YSR Congress Party

== See also ==
- List of municipalities in Andhra Pradesh
