= NAAC rating bribery case =

Indian bribery scandal

NAAC rating bribery case is the investigation and arrests of the chairman and six members of a National Assessment and Accreditation Council Inspection Committee, who were accused of accepting bribes in return for favorable accreditation ratings for various Indian universities and higher education institutions.

== Overview ==
On 1 February 2025, the Central Bureau of Investigation arrested the chairman and six members of a National Assessment and Accreditation Council (NAAC) Inspection Committee, over allegations of bribery for a favorable NAAC rating. The agency conducted raids across 20 locations in India, including Chennai, Bangalore, and New Delhi, recovering ₹37 lakh (US$44,000) in cash, gold, mobile phones, and laptops. The bribes were allegedly given by office bearers of a Guntur-based educational foundation which operates KL University.

== Investigation ==
According to the first information report filed by the CBI, arrests were made involving academicians from KL University, Jawaharlal Nehru University, Jagran Lakecity University, Davangere University, and Sambalpur University.
