= Urban agglomerations in Andhra Pradesh =

In the 2011 Census of India, an urban agglomeration was defined as "An urban agglomeration is a continuous urban spread constituting a town and its adjoining outgrowths, or two or more physically contiguous towns together with or without outgrowths of such towns. An Urban Agglomeration must consist of at least a statutory town and its total population (i.e. all the constituents put together) should not be less than 20,000 as per the 2001 Census."

Top 10 largest urban agglomerations in Andhra Pradesh

Urban agglomerations in the state of Andhra Pradesh with a population of 100,000 and above based on the Census of India of 2011
| S.No | Name | District | Population (2011) | Estimated Population (2024) |
|---|---|---|---|---|
| 1 | Visakhapatnam | Visakhapatnam | 1,730,320 | 2,385,110 |
| 2 | Vijayawada | NTR | 1,476,931 | 2,290,780 |
| 3 | Guntur | Guntur | 743,354 | 1,028,667 |
| 4 | Nellore | SPSR Nellore | 558,548 | 837,660 |
| 5 | Kurnool | Kurnool | 484,327 | 745,946 |
| 6 | Rajamahendravaram | East Godavari | 476,873 | 581,376 |
| 7 | Tirupati | Tirupati | 461,900 | 775,455 |
| 8 | Kakinada | Kakinada | 443,028 | 552,000 |
| 9 | Kadapa | Kadapa | 344,893 | 489,000 |
| 10 | Anantapuramu | Anantapuramu | 340,613 | 498,089 |
| 11 | Eluru | Eluru | 250,834 | 355,000 |
| 12 | Vizianagaram | Vizianagaram | 239,909 | 338,000 |
| 13 | Proddatur | Kadapa | 217,895 | 307,000 |
| 14 | Nandyal | Nandyal | 211,424 | 298,000 |
| 15 | Ongole | Prakasam | 208,344 | 294,000 |
| 16 | Adoni | Kurnool | 184,625 | 261,000 |
| 17 | Madanapalle | Annamayya | 180,180 | 255,000 |
| 18 | Chittoor | Chittoor | 175,647 | 248,000 |
| 19 | Machilipatnam | Krishna | 169,892 | 238,000 |
| 20 | Tenali | Guntur | 164,937 | 232,000 |
| 21 | Chirala | Bapatla | 162,471 | 229,000 |
| 22 | Hindupuram | Sri Sathya Sai | 151,677 | 214,000 |
| 23 | Srikakulam | Srikakulam | 147,015 | 207,000 |
| 24 | Bhimavaram | West Godavari | 146,961 | 207,000 |
| 25 | Tadepalligudem | West Godavari | 135,032 | 147,000 |
| 26 | Guntakal | Anantapuramu | 126,270 | 178,000 |
| 27 | Dharmavaram | Sri Sathya Sai | 121,874 | 170,000 |
| 28 | Gudivada | Krishna | 118,167 | 165,000 |
| 29 | Narasaraopeta | Palnadu | 117,489 | 163,000 |
| 30 | Kadiri | Sri Sathya Sai | 112,489 | 125,000 |
| 31 | Tadipatri | Anantapuramu | 108,171 | 152,000 |
| 32 | Chilakaluripeta | Palnadu | 101,398 | 142,000 |

== See also ==
- List of districts of Andhra Pradesh
- List of most populous metropolitan areas in India
- List of states and union territories of India by population
- Demographics of India
- List of cities in Andhra Pradesh by population
- List of million-plus urban agglomerations in India
