= Kallur, Kurnool district =

Kallur
- Municipal Corporation
- Nickname: Kallur
- Interactive map of Kallur
- Location in Andhra Pradesh, India
- Coordinates: 15°50′04″N 78°01′45″E
- Country: India
- State: Andhra Pradesh
- District: Kurnool
- Talukas: Kurnool

Government
  - Type: Municipal Corporation
  - Body: Kurnool Municipal Corporation

Languages
  - Official: Telugu
- Time zone: UTC+5:30 (IST)
- PIN: 518003

Kallur is an Urban Area in Kurnool Municipal Corporation located in Kurnool district of the Indian state of Andhra Pradesh. Western part of Kurnool city is called Kallur. Some main areas in Kurnool city like, Ballari Chowrasta, Chennamma Circle, Birla Compound, APSRTC Main Bus stand comes under Kallur mandal.

== Demographics ==
According to 2011 Census Kallur mandal has total population of 196,268, in which 144,798 comes under Kurnool Municipal Corporation and remaining 51,470 comes under Rural area.

Kallur Urban Area has sex ratio of 996. Kallur Rural area has sex ratio of 980.

Kallur urban area was merged with Kurnool Municipal Corporation in 2002. Kallur is industrially well developed. Industrial area in Kallur is called Kallur estate.

Kallur Mandal comes under Panyam Assembly Segment.
