= NRI Academy of Medical Sciences =

Medical college in Andhra Pradesh, India

Coordinates: 16°24′52.25″N 80°33′22.78″E

NRI Academy of Sciences
- Type: Private Medical College
- Established: 2003
- Academic affiliations: Dr. YSR University of Health Sciences, Vijayawada
- Superintendent: Dr. G. Srinivas
- Principal: Dr. V. Siva Prabodh
- Dean: Dr. N. Lakshmi
- Location: Mangalagiri, Guntur, AP, India
- Campus: Suburban
- Website: http://www.nrias.net

NRI Academy of Sciences, commonly known as NRI Medical College, is a private medical college and teaching hospital located in Chinakakani, Andhra Pradesh, India. Established in 2003, it was founded by a group of Non-Resident Indian (NRI) doctors from Andhra Pradesh to offer medical education and teritary healthcare in the Guntur-Vijaywada region.

The institution is recognized by the National Medical Commission (NMC) and is affiliated with Dr. YSR University of Health Sciences, Vijayawada.

== History ==
The college was set up in 2003 after the Government of Andhra Pradesh encouraged private participation in medical education. A group of Indian physicians living abroad bought 50 acres of land along National Highway 16 in Chinakakani, between Guntur and Vijayawada, to build the college and an attached general hospital.

One of its notable founders was Dr. Apparao Mukkamala, a prominent Indian-American radiologist who served as Chairman Emeritus of Radiology at Hurley Medical Center in Flint, Michigan, and Clinical Professor of Radiology at Michigan State University.

== Campus and infrastructure ==
The college sits on a 50-acre campus in Chinakakani, which falls under the Mangalagiri Tadepalli Municipal Corporation. The campus houses academic blocks, administrative offices, multi-story hostels for students and resident doctors, a central library, and staff quarters. The library holds over 10,000 books and printed medical journals, along with a digital learning room.

In addition to the medical college, the campus houses sister institutions providing super-specialised tertiary care and allied health education, including the NRI Cancer Centre, NRI College of Nursing, NRI College of Physiotherapy, and the NRI College of Medical Lab Technology.

== Academics ==
The institution offers medical programs at the undergraduate, postgraduate, and super-specialty levels:

- Undergraduate: The college admits 200 students annually for the Bachelor of Medicine, Bachelor of Surgery (MBBS) degree based on the NEET-UG exam.
- Postgraduate: It offers Doctor of Medicine (MD) and Master of Surgery (MS) degrees across broad specialties such as General Medicine, Surgery, Pediatrics, Orthopedics, and Obstetrics and Gynaecology.
- Super-specialty: Higher research degrees (DM and MCh) are offered in disciplines like Cardiology, Neurology, Nephrology, Medical Oncology, and Surgical Gastroenterology.

== Specialized centers and research ==
The hospital campus includes several dedicated clinical and research facilities:

- NRI Heart Centre: Provides interventional cardiology services, including a cardiac catheterization lab and cardiovascular device implant therapy.
- Oncology Wing: A dedicated unit providing medical, surgical, and radiation oncology care.
- Community Health & Welfare: The hospital participates in state-run healthcare schemes like Dr. YSR Aarogyasri to provide free or subsidized treatment to low-income populations, and conducts community health outreach camps in surrounding rural districts.

== Associated hospital ==
The campus includes a multi-specialty teaching facility known as NRI General Hospital, which is among the largest private hospitals in Andhra Pradesh. The hospital has over 1,000 beds and handles more than 2,000 outpatient visits daily. It provides free or subsidized treatment to rural patients in Guntur and Krishna districts.

Specialized facilities at the hospital include:

- A 24-hour emergency department and trauma center.
- Intensive Care Units (ICUs) for neonatal, pediatric, cardiac, and surgical care.
- Advanced super-specialty units for oncology, radiotherapy, nephrology with dialysis services, and neurosurgery.
