= SUT Academy of Medical Sciences =

Medical school in Thiruvananthapuram, Kerala, India

Sree Uthradon Thiurnal Academy of Medical Sciences
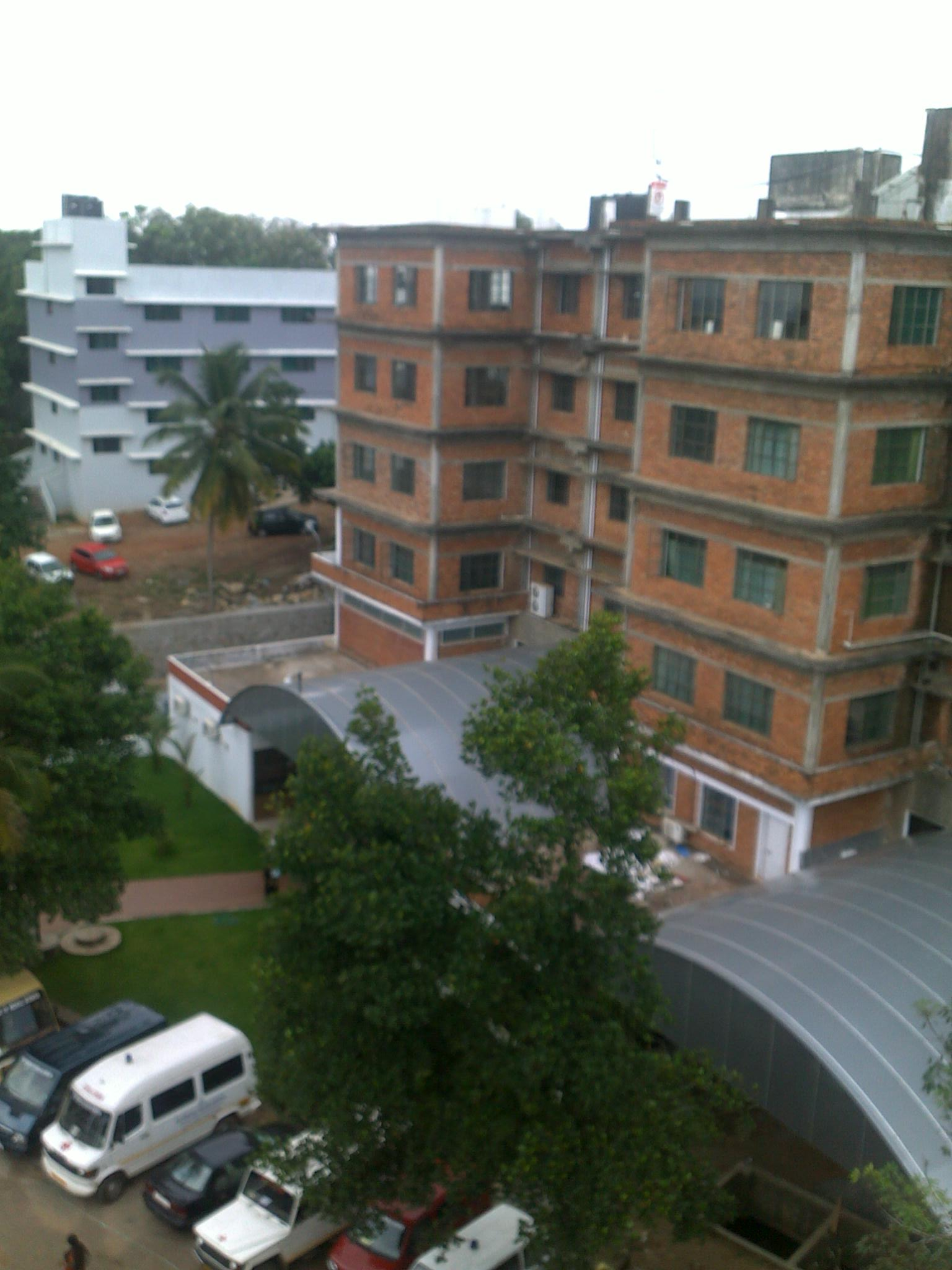
- Main Hospital Block
- Type: Exams are held by University of Kerala, Thiruvananthapuram, Kerala, India
- Established: 2006
- Affiliations: Kerala University of Health Sciences, NMC
- Principal: Dr. Ambili Remesh
- Location: SUT Academy of Medical Sciences, Vencode, Vattappara, Thiruvananthapuram, Kerala PIN - 695 028, Thiruvananthapuram, Kerala, India; 8°35′58″N 76°58′10″E
- Nickname: SUTAMS
- Website: https://sutams.edu.in

Sree Uthradom Thiurnal Academy of Medical Sciences is located in Thiruvananthapuram, the capital of Kerala state, India. It was founded in 2006 and is managed under the Sri. Moogambigai Charitable Trust.

== Location ==
SUT Academy of Medical Sciences is in the capital city of Kerala, Thiruvananthapuram — just 13 kilometers from Thiruvananthapuram city. The college campus and the hospital lie on Vattappara to Nedumangad road, at Vencod Junction.

== History of the SUT Group of Hospitals ==
Sree Uthradom Thirunal Hospital was inaugurated by E. K. Nayanar, then chief minister of Kerala, in 1987, at a time when tertiary care facilities were extremely inadequate in this part of the country. The main aim of the hospital was to establish such advanced medical and surgical facilities one by one.

The hospital was started with full facilities for Interventional Cardiology and Open Heart Surgery. The first coronary artery bypass surgery on beating heart in Kerala was done here. The first Mitral valvuloplasty was done here as well in 1988, three years after its introduction.

SUT Group started its second hospital, SUT Mother & Baby Hospital, at Pattom in 2001. It is devoted to high standards of care in Obstetrics, Gynecology and Neonatology.

The Academy was started in 2006 based in 30 acres of grounds.

A new SUT Royal Hospital was started near Ulloor in 2010.

SUT Group, under the Dr. K.N. Pai Heart Foundation had established a SUT Rural General Hospital at Vattappara, Nedumangad Municipality, to provide medical care at affordable costs. This hospital became the choice for the establishment of the new medical college, which is now being expanded to make it a center for the learning and practice of medicine. Currently, the hospital and campus is run by Sri.Moogambigai Charitable and educational Trust.

== Campus ==
The campus contains separate hostels for men and women, each complete with a study room, entertainment and indoor games room and an in-house gymnasium.

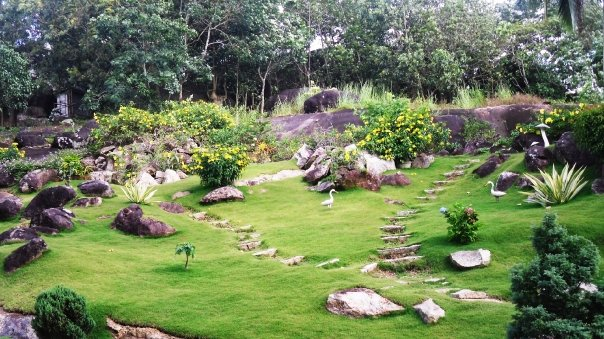

== Administration ==
The college is headed by principal Dr. Ambili Remesh and governed by Sri. Moogambigai Charitable and Education Trust.

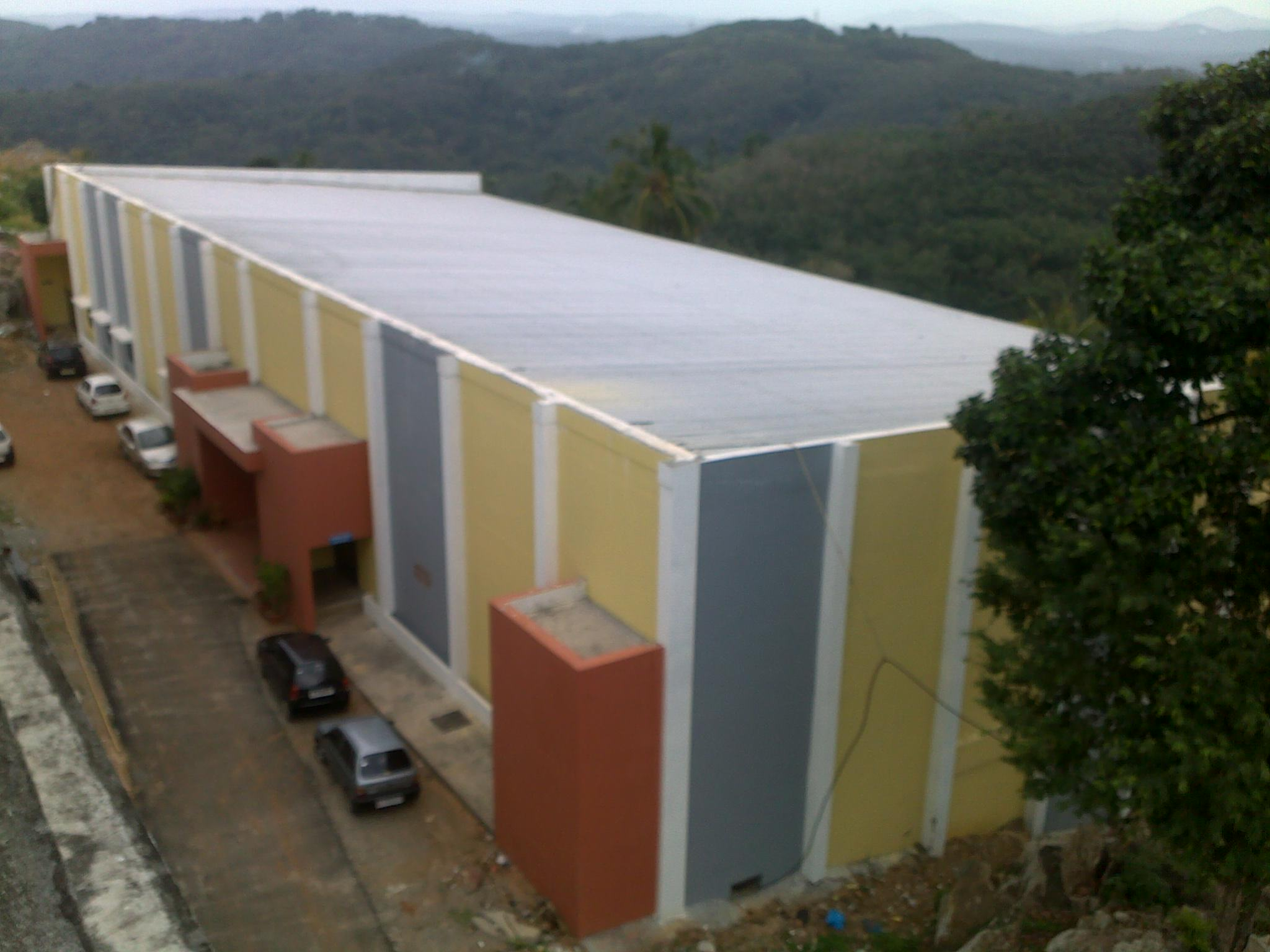
The New Block

== Academics ==
The first batch of students was admitted in October 2006. The annual admission is 150 students.

The four-and-a-half-year course offered by the institution is M.B.B.S. and it has to precede a one-year period serving as an intern.

The hospital also have MD/MS courses in various department as per the NMC norms.

== Academic departments ==
Pre-Clinical (two semesters)

- Anatomy
- Physiology
- Biochemistry

Para-Clinical (three semesters)

- Pharmacology
- Microbiology
- Pathology
- Forensic Medicine

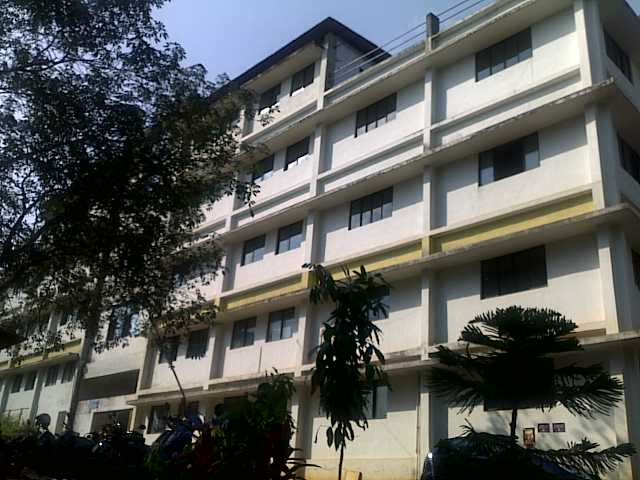
The Paraclinical Block

Clinical (four semesters)

- Community Medicine
- General Medicine
- General Surgery
- Obstetrics & Gynaecology
- Paediatrics
- Ophthalmology
- ENT

Each semester consists of roughly six months.

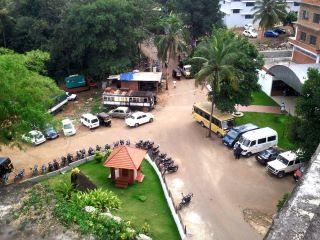

== See also ==
- Colleges in Thiruvananthapuram district
- Vattappara
- University of Kerala
