= Kolanukonda railway station =

Railway station in Andhra Pradesh, India

General information
- Location: National Highway 5, Andhra Pradesh; India
- Coordinates: 16.4481°N 80.6047°E
- Operator: Indian Railways
- Line: Vijayawada–Gudur section
- Platforms: 2
- Tracks: 2

Construction
- Structure type: Standard (On ground)
- Accessible: Disabled access

Other information
- Status: Active
- Station code: KAQ
- Zone(s): South Central Railway
- Division(s): Vijayawada

Services
Preceding station	Indian Railways	Following station
Krishna Canal towards ?	Vijayawada–Gudur section	Pedavadlapudi towards ?
Location
- Location within Andhra Pradesh Location within India
- Interactive map

Kolanukonda railway station (station code:KAQ), is an Indian railway station in Kolanukonda of Andhra Pradesh. It lies on the Vijayawada–Gudur section of Howrah–Chennai main line and is administered under Vijayawada railway division of South Central Railway zone.

== Classification ==
In terms of earnings and outward passengers handled, Chiluvur is categorized as a Halt Grade-3 (HG-3) railway station. Based on the re–categorization of Indian Railway stations for the period of 2017–18 and 2022–23, an HG–2 category station earns nearly ₹5 lakh and handles close to 1 lakh passengers.
