= KL University =

University in Andhra Pradesh, India

- Other name: K L Deemed to be University
- Former name: Koneru Lakshmaiah University
- Type: Deemed to be University
- Established: 1980
- Chancellor: Koneru Satyanarayana
- President: Koneru Satyanarayana
- Vice-Chancellor: G. Pardha Saradhi Varma
- Location: Green Fields, Vijayawada, Andhra Pradesh; Hyderabad, Telangana, 522502, India; 16°26′32″N 80°37′21″E
- Campus: KLEF Vijayawada: 0.404686 km^{2} (100 acres) KLEF Hyderabad (temporary campus): 0.09290304 km^{2} (23 acres)
- Language: English
- Colours: Red
- Website: kluniversity.in

K L University, formerly Koneru Lakshmaiah Educational Foundation, is an Indian private Deemed University, located in Vijayawada, Andhra Pradesh, and Hyderabad, Telangana, India. Founded in 1980 as Koneru Lakshmaiah College of Engineering, it consists of eight schools, offering academic programs at UG, PG, doctoral, and post-doctoral industry-focused courses.

As of 2025, the university has been barred from NAAC accreditation for 5 years after reports of bribing the assessor team to receive favourable ranking. Despite that, it is somehow ranked 35th among engineering colleges, 46th among overall universities, and 70th in Management by the NIRF 2025 Rankings.

== History ==
KLEF was established in 1980 at Vaddeswaram as K L College of Engineering (KLCE). It became autonomous in 2006 and was recognized as deemed to be university in 2009, known as K L University. Following the University Grants Commission's warning to 123 deemed institutes, not to use "university" in the name it was renamed Koneru Lakshmaiah Education Foundation (KLEF). In 2019, it was renamed K L Deemed to be University.

== Location ==
Koneru Lakshmaiah Deemed to be University is situated in a 100-acre (40 ha) site adjacent to Buckingham Canal, and is about 8 kilometres (5.0 mi) from Vijayawada in Krishna district and 33 kilometres (21 mi) from Guntur. The university is in Guntur district.

== Schools ==
KLEF includes the following schools:

- K L College of Engineering
- K L School of Science & Humanities
- K L School of Architecture
- K L School of Management
- K L School of Fine Arts
- K L School of Commerce
- K L School of Pharmacy
- K L School of Law
- K L School of Agriculture
- Center for Distance and Online Education

== Rankings ==
In the National Institutional Ranking Framework (NIRF) 2024, Koneru Lakshmaiah Education Foundation has been ranked 40th overall in India, 22nd among universities, 79th in the management category, and 35th in engineering.

University rankings

Engineering – India
- NIRF (2024): 35

== Controversies ==
=== NAAC rating bribery case ===
KL University became the center of a bribery investigation after the Central Bureau of Investigation arrested the chairman and six members of a National Assessment and Accreditation Council Inspection Committee on 1 February 2025. The arrests were made over allegations that bribes were paid to secure a favorable NAAC accreditation rating. The CBI conducted raids across 20 locations in India, including Chennai, Bangalore, and New Delhi, recovering ₹3,700,000 (US$40,000) in cash, gold, mobile phones, and laptops.

The alleged bribery was traced back to office bearers of KL University, leading to the arrest of several key individuals linked to the institution, including:

- G P Saradhi Varma – Vice-Chancellor, Koneru Lakshmaiah Education Foundation (KLEF), Guntur
- Koneru Raja Hareen – Vice-President, KLEF
- A Ramakrishna – Director, KL University, Hyderabad campus

=== Land fraud case ===
In February 2025, a complaint was registered against University Chairman Koneru Satyanarayana and his relative Nagalingeswara Rao for fraudulently registering an individual's 1.10-acre land in their name. They were summoned by the police in connection with the case. A court directed the police to investigate.

=== Incident involving fake degrees ===
In June 2025, Indian authorities at Rajiv Gandhi International Airport intercepted individuals using fake Bachelor of Technology degrees purportedly from Koneru Lakshmaiah Education Foundation (among other institutions). One case involved a student from Guntur who allegedly paid ₹40,000 (US$430) to an agent for a fabricated KL University degree to support a US visa application. While this points more to a broader fake certificate racket using the university's name, it has been associated with KL University in media reports.

=== Campus deaths ===
In December 2025, a first-year engineering student, Vari Suresh Reddy was found dead in a university hostel in mysterious circumstances. This incident prompted protests and demands for a thorough investigation. Also, this incident follows a previous, separate case on the KLU campus in February 2024, where a third-year engineering student, Vamshi Sai Krishna, was found dead.
