= List of urban local bodies in Andhra Pradesh =

This article lists all the urban local bodies in the Indian state of Andhra Pradesh, including municipal corporations, municipalities and Nagar panchayats. According to the Directorate of Town and Country Planning under the Government of Andhra Pradesh, the state comprises 123 urban local bodies across its 28 districts. These include 17 municipal corporations, 90 municipalities, and 16 Nagar panchayats.

Based on available data, Bheemunipatnam is the oldest municipality in Andhra Pradesh and the second oldest in India, after Chennapatnam (modern-day Chennai). Currently, Bheemunipatnam is part of the Greater Visakhapatnam Municipal Corporation (GVMC). In the Rayalaseema region, Adoni, located in the Kurnool district, holds the distinction of being the oldest municipality, followed by Kurnool.

The hierarchy of Urban Local Bodies

1. Urban Development Authority
2. Municipal Corporation
3. Municipality
  - Selection Grade Municipality
  - Special Grade Municipality
  - First Grade Municipality
  - Second Grade Municipality
  - Third Grade Municipality
4. Nagar Panchayat

== Municipal corporations ==
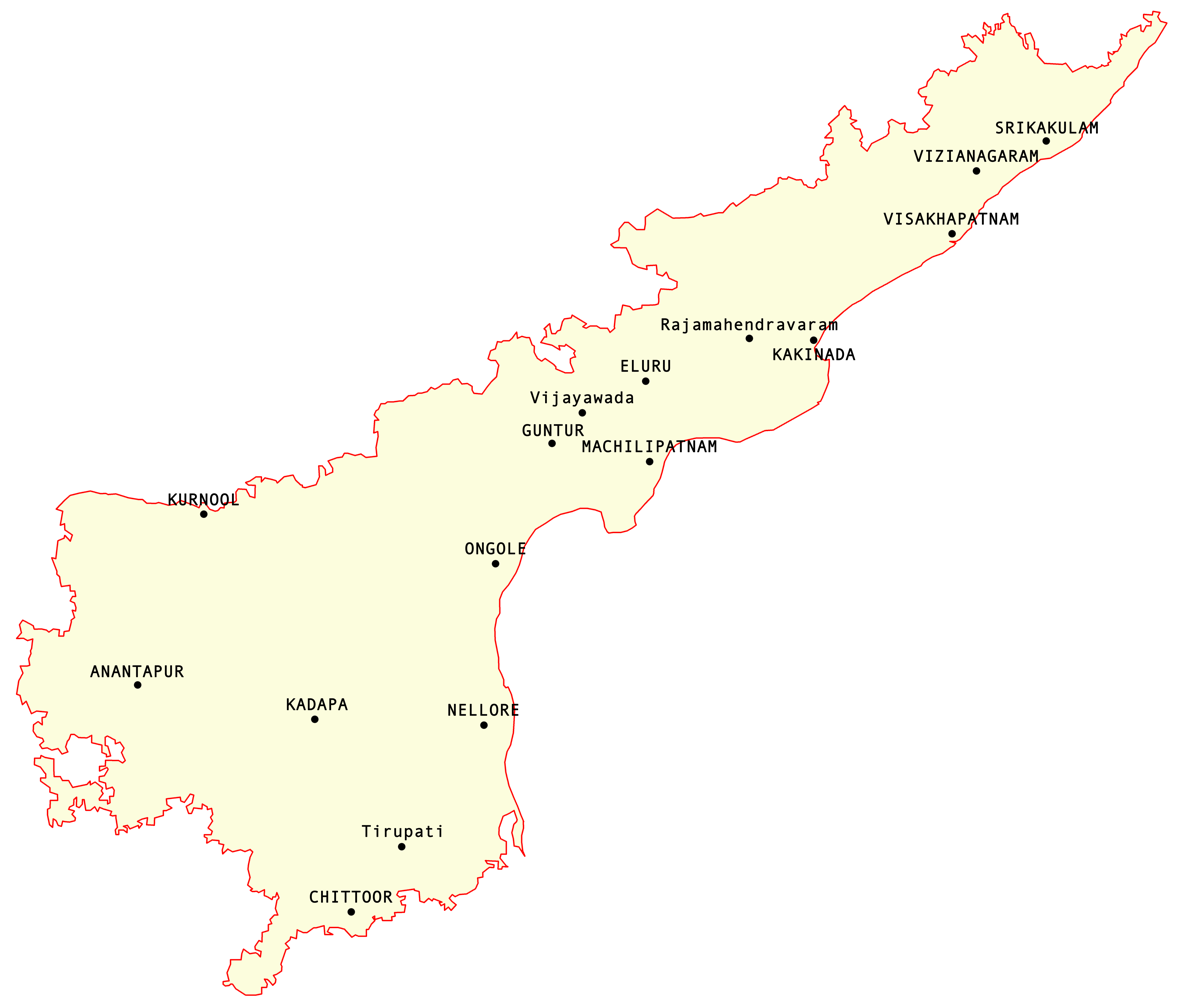
Municipal Corporations in Andhra Pradesh (before 2021)

The state of Andhra Pradesh comprises 17 municipal corporations across its 28 districts. The Guntur district has two municipal corporations whereas all other districts have one each. Of the 17 corporations, 16 serve as district headquarters; the exception is the Mangalagiri-Tadepalli corporation.

The cities of Vizianagaram, Machilipatnam and Srikakulam were upgraded to municipal corporations on 9 December 2015. In March 2021 former municipalities of the Guntur district, Mangalagiri Municipality and Tadepalli Municipality, were merged into the Mangalagiri Tadepalli Municipal Corporation.

#	District	Municipal Corporation	Year of Upgradation
1	Anantapur	Anantapur Municipal Corporation (AMC)	2005
2	Chittoor	Chittoor Municipal Corporation (CMC)	2012
3	East Godavari	Rajamahendravaram Municipal Corporation (RMC)	1994
4	Eluru	Eluru Municipal Corporation (EMC)	2005
5	Guntur	Guntur Municipal Corporation (GMC)	1994
6	Guntur	Mangalagiri–Tadepalli Municipal Corporation (MTMC)	2021
7	Kadapa	Kadapa Municipal Corporation (KMC)	2005
8	Kakinada	Kakinada Municipal Corporation (KMC)	2007
9	Krishna	Machilipatnam Municipal Corporation (MMC)	2015
10	Kurnool	Kurnool Municipal Corporation (KMC)	1994
11	Nellore	Nellore Municipal Corporation (NMC)	2004
12	NTR	Vijayawada Municipal Corporation (VMC)	1981
13	Prakasam	Ongole Municipal Corporation (OMC)	2012
14	Srikakulam	Srikakulam Municipal Corporation (SMC)	2015
15	Tirupati	Tirupati Municipal Corporation (TMC)	2007
16	Visakhapatnam, Anakapalli	Greater Visakhapatnam Municipal Corporation (GVMC)	1979
17	Vizianagaram	Vizianagaram Municipal Corporation (VMC)	2015

Source: Statistical Information of ULBs and UDAs

== Municipalities ==
Municipalities in the state of Andhra Pradesh are categorised into five types. They are in the following hierarchy

1. Selection Grade Municipality - 12
2. Special Grade Municipality - 9
3. First Grade Municipality - 15
4. Second Grade Municipality - 33
5. Third Grade Municipality - 18

Kadapa district and Palnadu district have the most municipalities of 6 among each.

District	Selection Grade	Special Grade	First Grade	Second Grade	Third Grade	Total
Alluri Sitarama Raju						0
Anakapalli					Narsipatnam, Elamanchili	2
Anantapur	Guntakal	Tadipatri	Rayadurgam		Gooty, Kalyandurg	5
Annamayya	Madanapalle	Rayachoty		Punganur		3
Bapatla			Bapatla, Chirala	Repalle		3
Chittoor					Palamaner, Nagari, Kuppam	3
East Godavari			Nidadavolu,Kovvur			2
Eluru			Jangareddygudem	Nuzvid		2
Guntur	Tenali			Ponnur		2
Kadapa		Proddatur	Pulivendula	Badvel, Rajampet, Yerraguntla	Mydukur	6
Kakinada	Pithapuram	Peddapuram		Samalkota, Tuni	Gollaprolu	5
Konaseema	Amalapuram			Mandapeta, Ramachandrapuram		3
Krishna		Gudivada	Tadigadapa	Vuyyuru	Pedana	4
Kurnool		Adoni, Yemmiganur				2
Markapuram				Markapuram, Kanigiri		2
Nandyal		Nandyal		Dhone, Nandikotkur, Allagadda	Atmakur	5
Nellore			Gudur, Kavali	Buchireddypalem, Kandukur	Atmakur	5
NTR				Jaggayyapeta, Nandigama	Kondapalli	3
Palnadu	Narasaraopet		Chilakaluripet	Macherla, Piduguralla, Sattenapalle, Vinukonda		6
Parvathipuram Manyam			Parvathipuram	Salur		2
Prakasam			Addanki	Chimakurthy, Darsi, Giddaluru		4
Polavaram						0
Sri Satyasai	Dharmavaram, Hindupur, Kadiri			Puttaparthi		4
Srikakulam				Amudalavalasa, Palasa–Kasibugga	Ichchapuram	3
Tirupati			Srikalahasti		Sullurpeta, Puttur, Venkatagiri, Naidupeta	5
Visakhapatnam						0
Vizianagaram				Bobbili	Rajam	2
West Godavari	Bhimavaram, Tadepalligudem	Palakollu, Tanuku	Narasapuram			5
Total	11	10	15	33	19	88

Source: Statistical Information of ULBs and UDAs

== Nagar panchayats ==
The state of Andhra Pradesh has a total of 16 nagar panchayats.

Palnadu district and Sri Sathya Sai district have the most nagar panchayats of 2 among each.

District	Nagar panchayats	Total
Ambedkar Konaseema	Mummidivaram	1
Annamayya	B.Kothakota	1
Kakinada	Yeleswaram	1
West Godavari	Akividu	1
Eluru	Chinthalapudi	1
Krishna		0
NTR		0
Palnadu	Dachepalle, Gurajala	2
Prakasam		0
Markapuram	Podili	1
Nellore	Allur	1
Kurnool	Gudur	1
Nandyal	Bethamcherla	1
Anantapur		0
Sri Satyasai	Madakasira, Penukonda	2
Kadapa	Kamalapuram	1
Parvathipuram Manyam	Palakonda	1
Vizianagaram	Nellimarla	1
Total		16

== Municipalities formation year ==
S.No.	Municipality Name	District	Year of constitution
1	Srikakulam	Srikakulam	1856
2	Bheemunipatnam Merged with GVMC	Visakhapatnam	1861

S.No	Municipality Name	District	Year of constitution
1	Adoni	Kurnool	1865
2	Rajamahendravaram	East Godavari	1865
3	Visakhapatnam	Visakhapatnam	1865

S.No	Municipality Name	District	Year of constitution
1	Guntur	Guntur	1866
2	Kurnool	Kurnnol	1866
3	Nellore	Nellore	1866
4	Machilipatnam	Krishna	1866
5	Kakinada	Kakinada	1866
6	Eluru	Eluru	1866

S.No.	Municipality Name	District	Year of Constitution
1	Kadapa	Kadapa	1868
2	Anantapuram	Anantapuram	1869
3	Ongole	Prakasam	1876
4	Tirupati	Tirupati	1886
5	Vizianagaram	Vizianagaram	1888
6	Vijayawada	NTR	1888
7	Nandyal	Nandyal	2000

S.No.	Municipality Name	District	Year of Constitution
1	Tenali	Guntur	1912
2	Proddatur	Kadapa	1915
3	Peddapuram	Kakinada	1915
4	Pithapuram	Kakinada	1915
5	Narasaraopet	Palnadu	1915
6	Chittoor	Chittoor	1915
7	Palakollu	West Godavari	1919
8	Hindupuram	Sri Sathya Sai	1920
9	Tadipatri	Anantapuram	1920
10	Gudivada	Krishna	1937

Above 28 are the municipalities formed before Independence.

S.No.	Municipality Name	District	Year of Constitution
1	Guntakal	Anantapuram	1948
2	Amalapuram	Konaseema	1948
3	Bhimavaram	West Godavari	1948
4	Chirala	Bapatla	1948
5	Saluru	Parvathipuram Manyam	1950
6	Bapatla	Bapatla	1951
7	Gudur	Nellore	1951
8	Bobbili	Vizianagaram	1956
9	Narsapur	West Godavari	1956
10	Repalle	Bapatla	1956
11	Mandapeta	Konaseema	1958
12	Samalkota	Kakinada	1958
13	Tadepalligudem	West Godavari	1958
14	Srikalahasti	Tirupati	1958
15	Parvathipuram	Parvathipuram Manyam	1959
16	Ramachandrapuram	Konaseema	1959
17	Tuni	Kakinada	1959
18	Madanapalli	Annamayya	1961
19	Rayadurgam	Anantapuram	1963
20	Nidadavole	East Godavari	1964
21	Chilakaluripet	Palnadu	1964
22	Ponnur	Guntur	1964
23	Markapuram	Markapuram	1964
24	Dharmavaram	Sri Sathya Sai	1964
25	Kadiri	Sri Sathya Sai	1964
26	Kovvur	East Godavari	1965
27	Yemmiganur	Kurnool	1965
28	Kavali	Nellore	1967
29	Mangalagiri [Merged with MTMC]	Guntur	1969
30	Tanuku	West Godavari	1979
31	Nuzvid	Eluru	1983
32	Macherla	Palnadu	1983
33	Sattenapalle	Palnadu	1984
34	Pedana	Krishna	1985
35	Punganur	Annamayya	1985
36	Ichapuram	Srikakulam	1986
37	Amadalavalasa	Srikakulam	1987
38	Kandukur	Prakasam	1987
39	Jaggaiahpeta	NTR	1988
40	Palasa - Kasibugga	Srikakulam	2000

In 2005, the government of Andhra Pradesh upgraded 12 areas as municipalities.

S.No.	Municipality Name	District	Year of Constitution
1	Rajam	Vizianagaram	2005
2	Piduguralla	Palnadu	2005
3	Vinukonda	Palnadu	2005
4	Dhone	Nandyal	2005
5	Jammalamadugu	Kadapa	2005
6	Pulivendula	Kadapa	2005
7	Rajampeta	Kadapa	2005
8	Rayachoty	Annamayya	2005
9	Palamaneru	Chittoor	2005
10	Nagari	Chittoor	2005
11	Puttur	Tirupati	2005
12	Venkatagiri	Tirupati	2005

S.No.	Municipality Name	District	Year of Constitution
1	Badvel	Kadapa	2006
2	Tadepalle [Merged with MTMC]	Guntur	2009

In 2011, the government of Andhra Pradesh upgraded 21 areas as municipalities.

S.No.	Municipality Name	District	Year of Constitution
1	Narsipatnam	Anakapalli	2011
2	Yelamanchili	Anakapalli	2011
3	Gollaprolu	Kakinada	2011
4	Mummidivaram	Konaseema	2011
5	Yeleswaram	Kakinada	2011
6	Janga reddy gudem	Eluru	2011
7	Nandigama	NTR	2011
8	Tiruvuru	NTR	2011
9	Vuyyuru	Krishna	2011
10	Addanki	Bapatla	2011
11	Chimakurthy	Prakasam	2011
12	Giddalur	Markapuram	2011
13	Kanigiri	Markapuram	2011
14	Gooty	Anantapur	2011
15	Madakasira	Sri Satya Sai	2011
16	Puttaparthi	Sri Sathya Sai	2011
17	Allagadda	Nandyal	2011
18	Atmakur - N	Nandyal	2011
19	Gudur - K	Kurnool	2011
20	Nandikotkur	Nandyal	2011
21	Mydukur	Kadapa	2011

In 2012, 6 more Towns were upgraded as Municipal Bodies

S.No.	Municipality Name	District	Year of Constitution
1	Kalyanadurgam	Anantapur	2012
2	Pamidi	Anantapur	2012
3	Yerraguntla	Kadapa	2012
4	Sullurupeta	Tirupati	2012
5	Naidupeta	Tirupati	2012
6	Atmakur - N	Nellore	2012

S.No.	Municipality Name	District	Year of Constitution
1	Palakonda	Parvathipuram Manyam	2013
2	Nellimarla	Vizianagaram	2013

As of 2020, the government of Andhra Pradesh has upgraded 10 areas as Municipal Bodies.

S.No.	Municipality Name	District	Year of Constitution
1	Kamalapuram	Kadapa	2020
2	Bethamcherla	Nandyal	2020
3	Kuppam	Chittoor	2020
4	Penukonda	Sri Sathya Sai	2020
5	Buchireddy Palem	Nellore	2020
6	Darsi	Prakasam	2020
7	Dachepalle	Palnadu	2020
8	Guruzala	Palnadu	2020
9	Kondapalli	NTR	2020
10	Akiveedu	West Godavari	2020

In 2021, the government of Andhra Pradesh created 1 municipal corporation and 1 Municipality.

S.No.	Municipality Name	District	Year of Constitution	Notes
1	MTMC	Guntur	2021	Merged Mangalagiri & Tadepalli to form MTMC
2	Tadigadapa	Krishna	2021	Renamed from YSRTadigadapa to Tadigadapa in 2025

Source of Formation Year

http://dtcp.ap.gov.in/dtcpweb/ulbs/List%20of%20ULBs-27-2-2019.pdf

http://dtcp.ap.gov.in/dtcpweb/ULBS.html

Directorate of Town and Country Planning website.
