= Tadepalli, Guntur district =

Neighbourhood of Mangalagiri - Tadepalli city, Andhra Pradesh, India

Tadepalli
- Neighbourhood
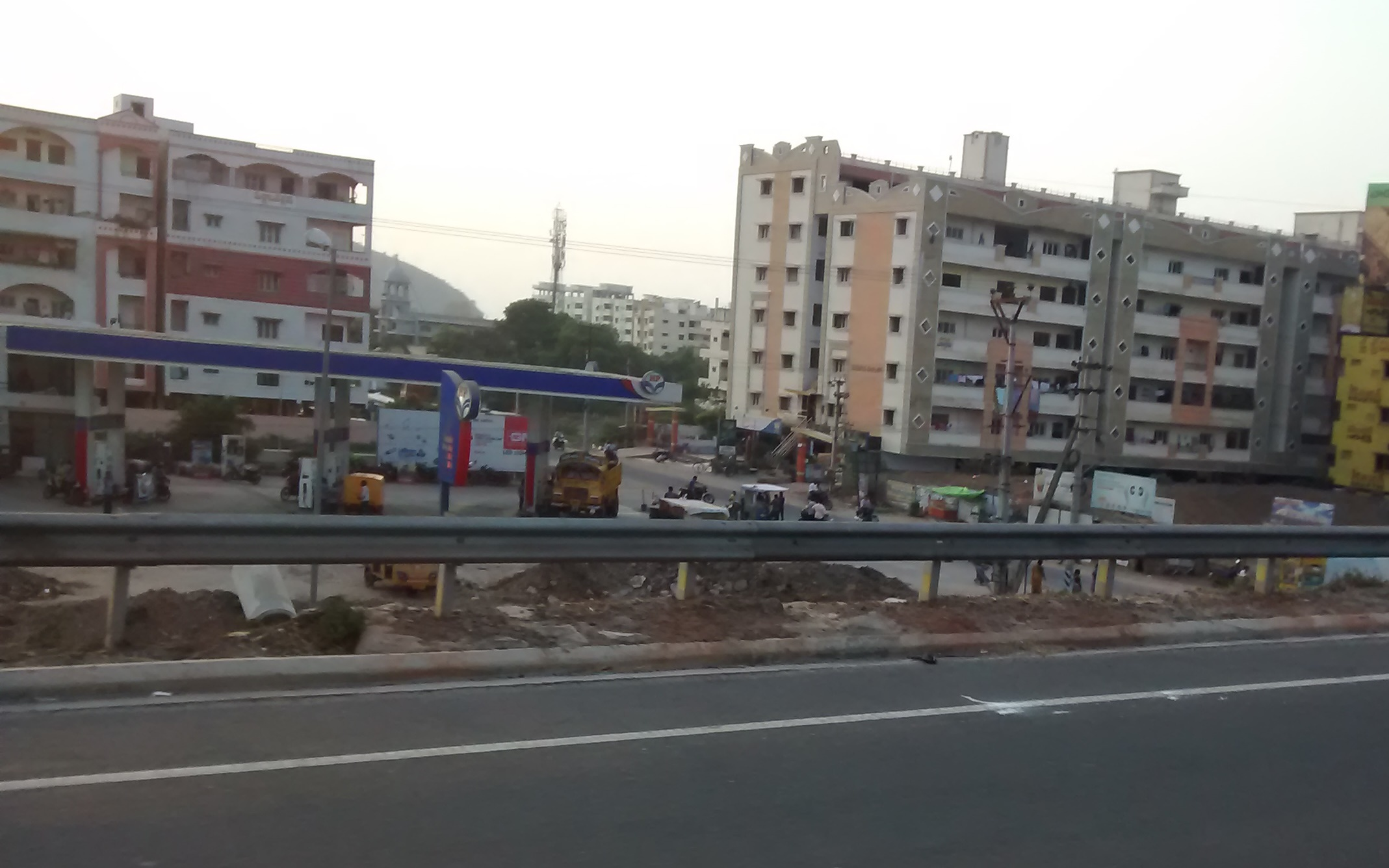
- Residential area in Tadepalle near National Highway 16

- Location in Andhra Pradesh, India
- Coordinates: 16°28′49″N 80°37′07″E
- Country: India
- State: Andhra Pradesh
- District: Guntur
- City: Mangalagiri - Tadepalli

Government
  - Type: Municipal Corporation
  - Body: Mangalagiri Tadepalli Municipal Corporation(MTMC)

Area
  - Total: 25.45 km^{2} (9.83 sq mi)
- Elevation: 19 m (62 ft)

Population
  - Total: 64,149
  - Density: 2,521/km^{2} (6,528/sq mi)

Languages
  - Official: Telugu
- Time zone: UTC+5:30 (IST)
- PIN: 522 501
- Vehicle registration: AP-07, AP–39
- Website: mangalagiri.cdma.ap.gov.in

Tadepalli is a neighborhood of Mangalagiri - Tadepalli city in Guntur district, Andhra Pradesh, India. It is a major residential and IT hub. It is situated on National Highway 16 and north of district headquarter Guntur. It is adjacent to Vijayawada.

== Etymology ==
The origin of the name is believed to be related to the Palm tree 'Thati' and 'palle' meaning village. Tadepalli is on the southern bank of the Krishna river in Guntur district. The canal flowing through the town is named as Madras Kaluva (Buckingham Canal) – as it goes until Madras (Chennai). Tadepalli, along with Tenali was an 'Agraharam' – or endowed land to Sanskrit Scholars during the classical Sri Krishnadevaraya period.

== History ==
Tadepalli Municipality was constituted in the year 2009. It was classified as a First Grade municipality and had 34 municipal wards. With the merger of all the 10 villages of the Tadepalli mandal in Tadepalli, the town had a population of 99,248 according to the Census 2011. It was spread over an area of 61.76 km^{2} (23.85 sq mi). From March 2021 the town has become part of Mangalagiri - Tadepalli city

== Geography ==
Tadepalli is located at 16.4667°N 80.6000°E. It has an average elevation of 6 m (20 ft). Total municipality contains hill area and agricultural lands. Buckingham canal flows from north to south in the region. The municipality contains old industrial lands, belongs to EID parry company and cement factory which are not being used for any purpose.

== Demographics ==
As of 2011 census of India, Tadepalli had a population of 54,406, with number of households accounting to 14392. The total population constitutes 27,149 males, 27,257 females and 6,078 under 6 years of age. The sex ratio stands at 1004 females per 1000 males. There are 36,694 literates with an average literacy rate of 75.93%, significantly higher than the state average of 67.41%. The urban agglomeration population of the town stands at 64,149.

== Transport ==
The town has a total road length of 107.41 km (66.74 mi). APSRTC runs buses from Guntur, Amaravathi and Vijayawada through this town. The railway station is named as Krishna Canal. It is a junction for Guntur and the Vijayawada divisions.

== Education ==
The primary education in the town is imparted by means of elementary schools and for secondary education is offered by schools like, Zilla Parishad High School and Ramakrishna Mission High School.

== Notable people ==
- Kallam Anji Reddy, the founder of Dr. Reddy's Laboratories

== See also ==
- List of municipalities in Andhra Pradesh
