= Kurnool Municipal Corporation =

Local civic body in Kurnool, Andhra Pradesh, India

Kurnool Municipal Corporation Karnūlu nagara pālaka Sanstha కర్నూలు నగర పాలక సంస్థ
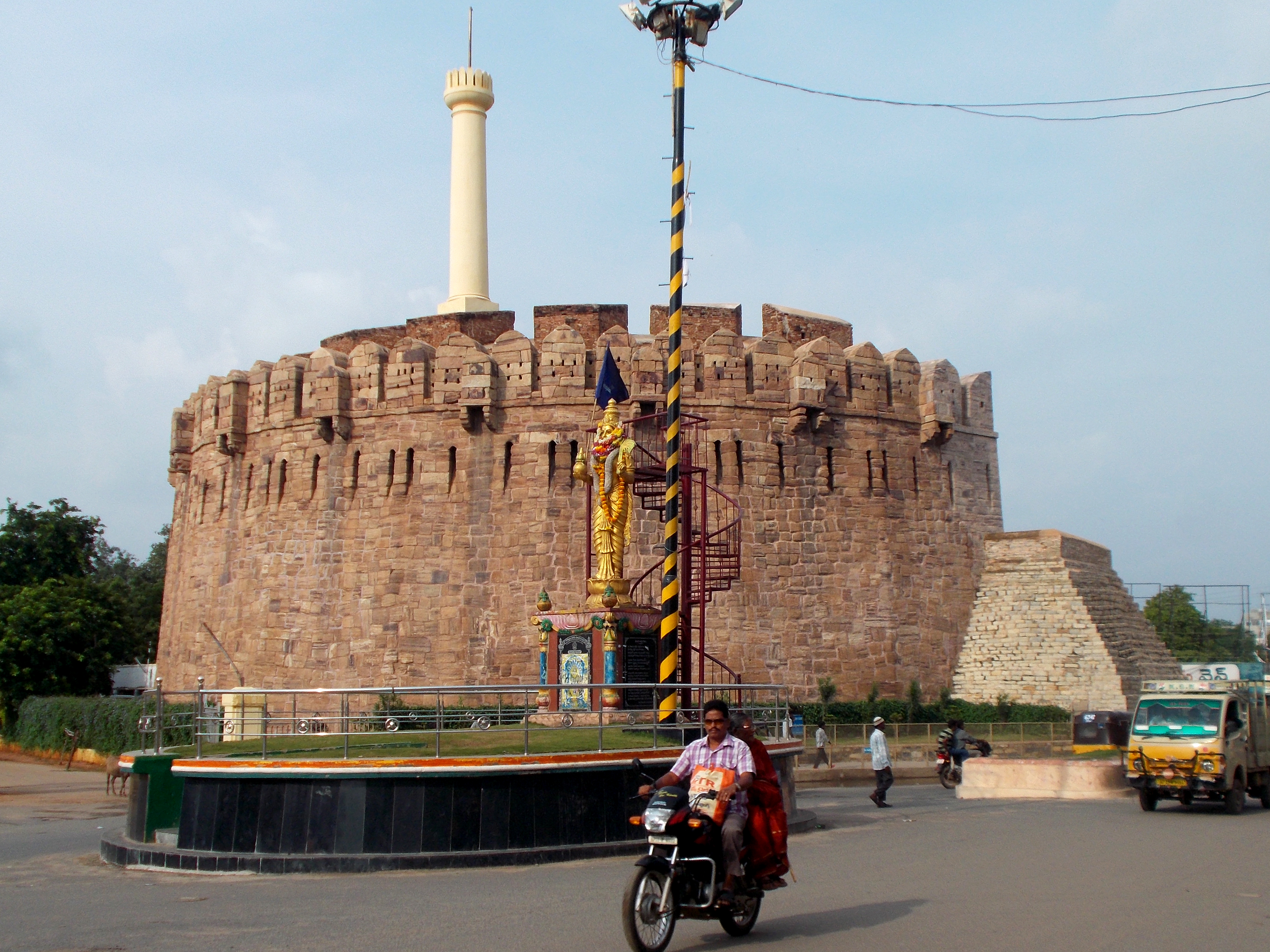

Type
- Type: Municipal Corporation of the Kurnool

History
- Founded: 1994

Leadership
- Mayor: Vacant (since 18 March 2026)
- Deputy Mayor: Vacant (since 18 March 2026)
- Municipal Commissioner: Songa Ravindra Babu
- Seats: 52

Elections
- Last election: 10 March 2021
- Next election: TBH

Website
- kurnool.cdma.ap.gov.in

Kurnool Municipal Corporation is a civic body of Kurnool in the Indian state of Andhra Pradesh. It was constituted as a municipality in the year 1994. Municipal Corporation mechanism in India was introduced during British Rule with formation of municipal corporation in Madras (Chennai) in 1688, later followed by municipal corporations in Bombay (Mumbai) and Calcutta (Kolkata) by 1762. Kurnool Municipal Corporation is headed by Mayor of city and governed by Commissioner. The present municipal commissioner of the corporation is D. K. Balaji.

== Jurisdiction ==
The corporation is spread over an area of 69.75 km^{2} (26.93 sq mi) with 52 election wards.

== List of mayors ==
Kurnool Municipal Corporation (KMC)
| Sno. | Mayor | DY Mayor | Term start | Term end | Party | Notes |
|---|---|---|---|---|---|---|
| 1. | Bangi Anantaiah | Pinjari Fakruddin | 1995 | 2000 | Telugu Desam Party | First Mayor & Deputy Mayor of KMC |
| 2. | Feroz Begum | S.Raghuramireddy | 2000 | 2005 | Indian National Congress | |
| 3. | S.Raghuramireddy | | 2005 | 2010 | Indian National Congress | |
| 4. | B.Y.Ramaiah | S.Renuka; N.Aruna | 2021 | 2026 | YSR Congress Party | |

=== 2021 ordinary elections ===
| S.No. | Party name | Won | Change |
|---|---|---|---|
| 1 | YSR Congress Party | 44 | Steady |
| 2 | Telugu Desam Party | 6 | Steady |
| 3 | Independents | 2 | Steady |

== Functions ==
Kurnool Municipal Corporation is created for the following functions:

- Planning for the town including its surroundings which are covered under its Department's Urban Planning Authority.
- Approving construction of new buildings and authorising use of land for various purposes.
- Improvement of the town's economic and Social status.
- Arrangements of water supply towards commercial, residential and industrial purposes.
- Planning for fire contingencies through Fire Service Departments.
- Creation of solid waste management, public health system and sanitary services.
- Working for the development of ecological aspect like development of Urban Forestry and making guidelines for environmental protection.
- Working for the development of weaker sections of the society like mentally and physically handicapped, old age and gender biased people.
- Making efforts for improvement of slums and poverty removal in the town.

== Revenue sources ==
The following are the Income sources for the Corporation from the Central and State Government.

=== Revenue from taxes ===
Following is the Tax related revenue for the corporation.

- Property tax.
- Profession tax.
- Entertainment tax.
- Grants from Central and State Government like Goods and Services Tax.
- Advertisement tax.

=== Revenue from non-tax sources ===
Following is the Non Tax related revenue for the corporation.

- Water usage charges.
- Fees from Documentation services.
- Rent received from municipal property.
- Funds from municipal bonds.
