= Mangalagiri – Tadepalli Municipal Corporation =

Municipality in Andhra Pradesh, India

Mangalagiri–Tadepalli Municipal Corporation
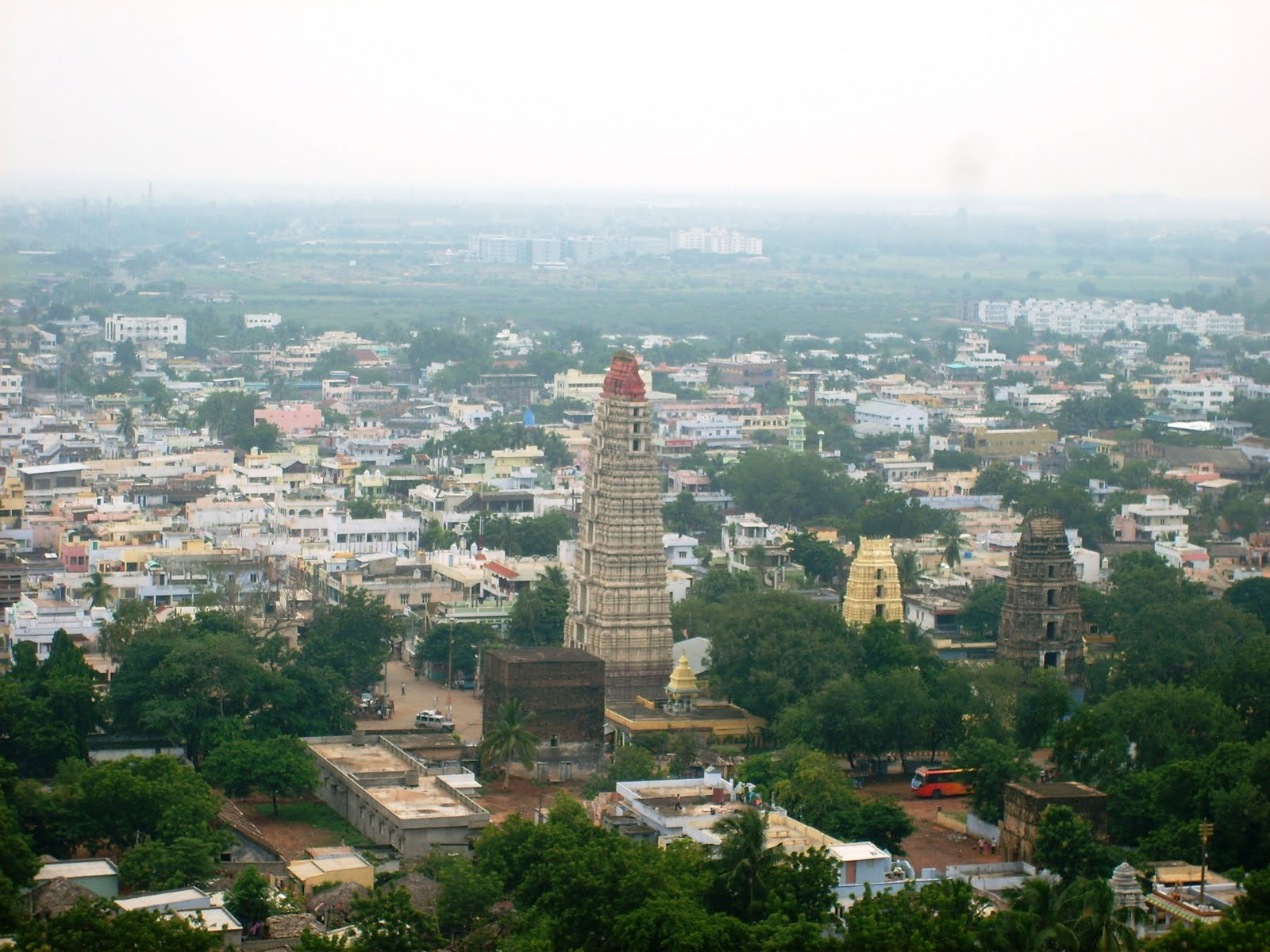
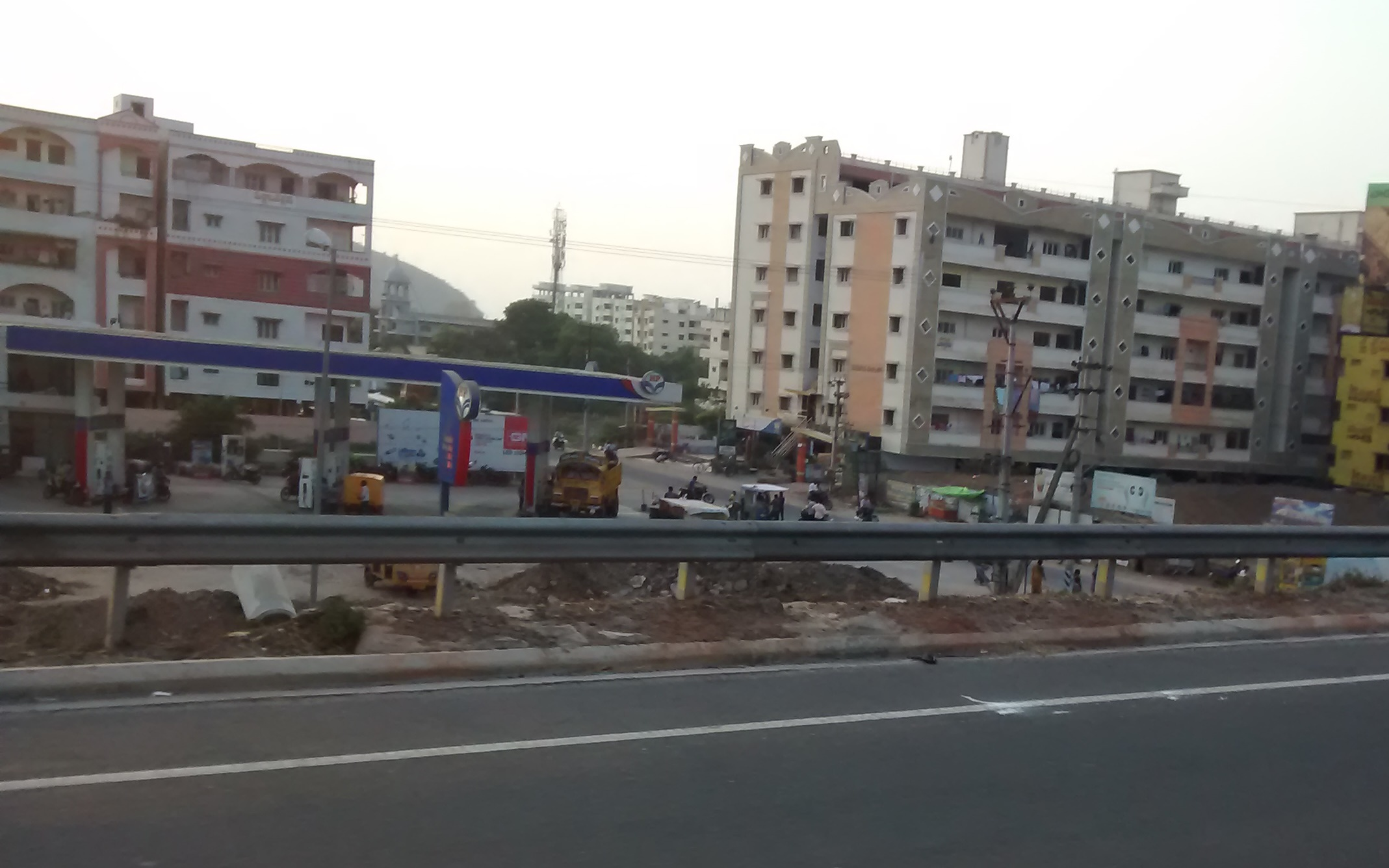

Type
- Type: Municipal corporation

History
- Founded: 2020

Leadership
- Mayor: Vacant
- Deputy Mayor: Vacant
- Municipal commissioner: Sk.Aleem Basha
- Seats: 64

Website
- MTMC website

The Mangalagiri–Tadepalli Municipal Corporation (MTMC) is the civic body that governs Mangalagiri – Tadepalli city in Guntur district of Andhra Pradesh. It is the second largest municipal corporation next in line to GVMC in terms of area with 194.41 km^{2} (75.06 sq mi) and 2,53,875 of voters in the state of Andhra Pradesh.

== History ==
Mangalagiri Municipality was formed in 1959, Tadepalli Municipality was formed in 2009. In January 2021, the Municipal Administration and Urban Development Department issued an order notifying the merger of eleven-gram panchayats of Mangalagiri mandal with Mangalagiri Municipality and merger of ten-gram panchayats of Tadepalli mandal with Tadepalli Municipality. In line to develop the Mangalagiri and Tadepalli as model towns, on 23 March 2021, Government of Andhra Pradesh merged Mangalagiri Municipality and Tadepalli Municipality to form Mangalagiri–Tadepalli Municipal Corporation. The municipality with the help of Irrigation Department, improves the drinking water, internal roads, supply of electricity and sewerage management. 2021 Mangalagiri –Tadepalli Municipal Corporation to be developed into model towns at an estimated cost of Rs 1,173.66 crore, and a detailed administrative sanction for the same would be accorded shortly.

== Jurisdiction ==
Mangalagiri - Tadepalli Municipal Corporation

== Notable people ==
- Kallam Anji Reddy, the founder of Dr. Reddy's Laboratories
- Kallam Satish Reddy present Chairman of Dr. Reddy's Laboratories
- Savitri (actress)
- Jamuna (actress)

== Municipal Chairmans ==
MTMC Mayor's
Sno.	Mayor	Party	DY-Mayor	Party	Term start	Term end
Mangalagiri Corporation Chairman's
Sno.	Chairman	Party	V-Chairman	Party	Term start	Term end
1.	G.Gopalarao	INC	Sk Ahmad Ali	CPI	1971	1976
2.	S.V.Koteswararao	CPI	Mahaboob Beg	IND	1981	1986
3.	M.Hanumantharao	INC	Sk Saleem	INC	1987	1992
4.	G.Veeranjaneyulu	TDP	C.Pichaiah; K.Sriramamurthy	CPI	1995	2000
5.	Kandru Kamala	INC	A.Narasimharao	CPI	2000	2005
6.	K.Srinivasa Rao	INC	M.Malleswara Rao	INC	2005	2010
7.	G.Chiranjeevi	TDP	S.Balajiguptha	TDP	2014	2019
Tadepalli Municipal Chairman
1.	K.Mahalakshmi	YSRCP	D.Ramakrishnareddy	YSRCP	2014	2019

== Divisions ==
Mangalagiri–Tadepalli Municipal Corporation has a total of 64 wards.

Ward No	Name of the Ward	Ward No	Name of the Ward	Ward No	Name of the Ward
1	Rajarajeswari Nagar	23	Nowluru-1	45	Kothapeta
2	Andraratnakatta	24	Nowluru-2	46	Indira Nagar
3	Navodaya Colony	25	Nowluru-3	47	Gandalayapeta
4	Mahanadu-01	26	Bhetapudi	48	Dwaraka Nagar
5	Mahanadu-02	27	Bapanaiah Nagar	49	Lalbahadure Nagar
6	Seethanagaram	28	Nidamarru-2	50	Sharaff Bazar
7	Undavalli Center	29	Nidamarru-1	51	Baptistpeta
8	Kottur	30	Kaza-2	52	Weavers Colony
9	Padmasali Bazar	31	Kaza-1	53	Atmakur-1
10	Nulakapeta	32	Chinakakani-2	54	Pedavadlapudi-1
11	Salam Center	33	Chinakakani-1	55	Pedavadlapudi-2
12	Drivers Colony	34	Markandeya Colony	56	Pedavadlapudi-3
13	Brahmanandapuram	35	Tipparla Bazar-01	57	Nutakki-1
14	Sivadurgapuram	36	Sri Lakshmi Narasimha swamy Colony	58	Nutakki-2
15	Dolasnagar	37	Suryanarayana Nagar	59	Chirrauru
16	Undavalli-2	38	NCC Road	60	Prathuru
17	Undavalli-1	39	Koppuravu Colony	61	Ippatam
18	Penumaka-1	40	Vegetables Market	62	Vaddeswaram
19	Penumaka-2	41	Markandeya Colony	63	Kolanukonda
20	Yerrabalem-3	42	Tipparla Bazar-02	64	Kunchanapalli
21	Yerrabalem-1	43	Bank Colony		
22	Yerrabalem-2	44	Bhagatsingh Nagar		

== Tourism ==
Lakshmi Narasimha Temple is the abode of Lord Vishnu, who manifested himself as Thotadri, is present in Mangalagiri. There are three Narasimha Swamy temples.[28] Undavalli caves, located in Undavalli, are a specimen of Indian rock-cut architecture. The historic caves are located at the top of the hills overlooking the Krishna River, built during the 4th-5th century. Dedicated to Ananta Padmanabha Swamy and Narasimha Swamy, Undavalli Cave Temples are associated with the Vishnukundina kings. Swami Chinna Jeeyar Asramam and Temple town was located in Sitanagaram Tadepalli. Haailand Resorts is the biggest Amusement park on the Guntur-Vijayawada highway. Adventura and Vijayawada Club are recreation places in the corporation.

== Notable Places in Corporation ==
- N. Chandrababu Naidu Camp Office
- Y. S. Jagan Mohan Reddy Camp Office
- Pawan Kalyan Camp Office
- Andhra Pradesh Industrial Infrastructure Corporation Head Quarters
- Andhra Pradesh Police Head Quarters
- Prakasam Barrage
- Buckingham Canal
- Kanaka Durga Varadhi
- AIIMS Mangalagiri
- ACA International Cricket Stadium
- Lakshmi Narasimha Temple, Mangalagiri
- Undavalli Caves
- Krishna Canal Junction railway station
- Mangalagiri railway station
- KL University
- NRI Academy of Medical Sciences
- SRM University, Andhra Pradesh
- Amrita Vishwa Vidyapeetham
- Manipal Hospitals India
- Telugu Desam Party office for Andhra Pradesh
- YSR Congress Party office for Andhra Pradesh
- Jana Sena Party office for Andhra Pradesh

== See also ==
- List of municipalities in Andhra Pradesh
