= Bharatiya Janata Party – Andhra Pradesh =

Andhra Pradesh affiliate of the Bharatiya Janata Party

- Abbreviation: BJP
- President: P. V. N. Madhav
- Chairman: Penmetsa Vishnu Kumar Raju
- Founder: Atal Bihari Vajpayee; Lal Krishna Advani... and others: Murli Manohar Joshi; Nanaji Deshmukh; KR Malkani; Sikandar Bakht; Vijay Kumar Malhotra; Vijaya Raje Scindia; Bhairon Singh Shekhawat; Shanta Kumar; Ram Jethmalani; Jagannathrao Joshi
- Founded: 6 April 1980 (46 years ago)
- Split from: Janata Party
- Preceded by: Bharatiya Jana Sangh (1951–1977); Janata Party (1977–1980)
- Headquarters: Vijayawada, Andhra Pradesh - 522003
- Labour wing: Bharatiya Mazdoor Sangh
- Peasant's wing: Bharatiya Kisan Sangh
- Ideology: Conservatism Hindu Nationalism; Hindutva
- Political position: Right-wing
- Colours: Saffron
- ECI status: National party
- Alliance: National Democratic Alliance
- Seats in Rajya Sabha: 2 / 11
- Seats in Lok Sabha: 3 / 25
- Seats in Andhra Pradesh Legislative Council: 2 / 58
- Seats in Andhra Pradesh Legislative Assembly: 8 / 175

Election symbol
- Lotus

Party flag
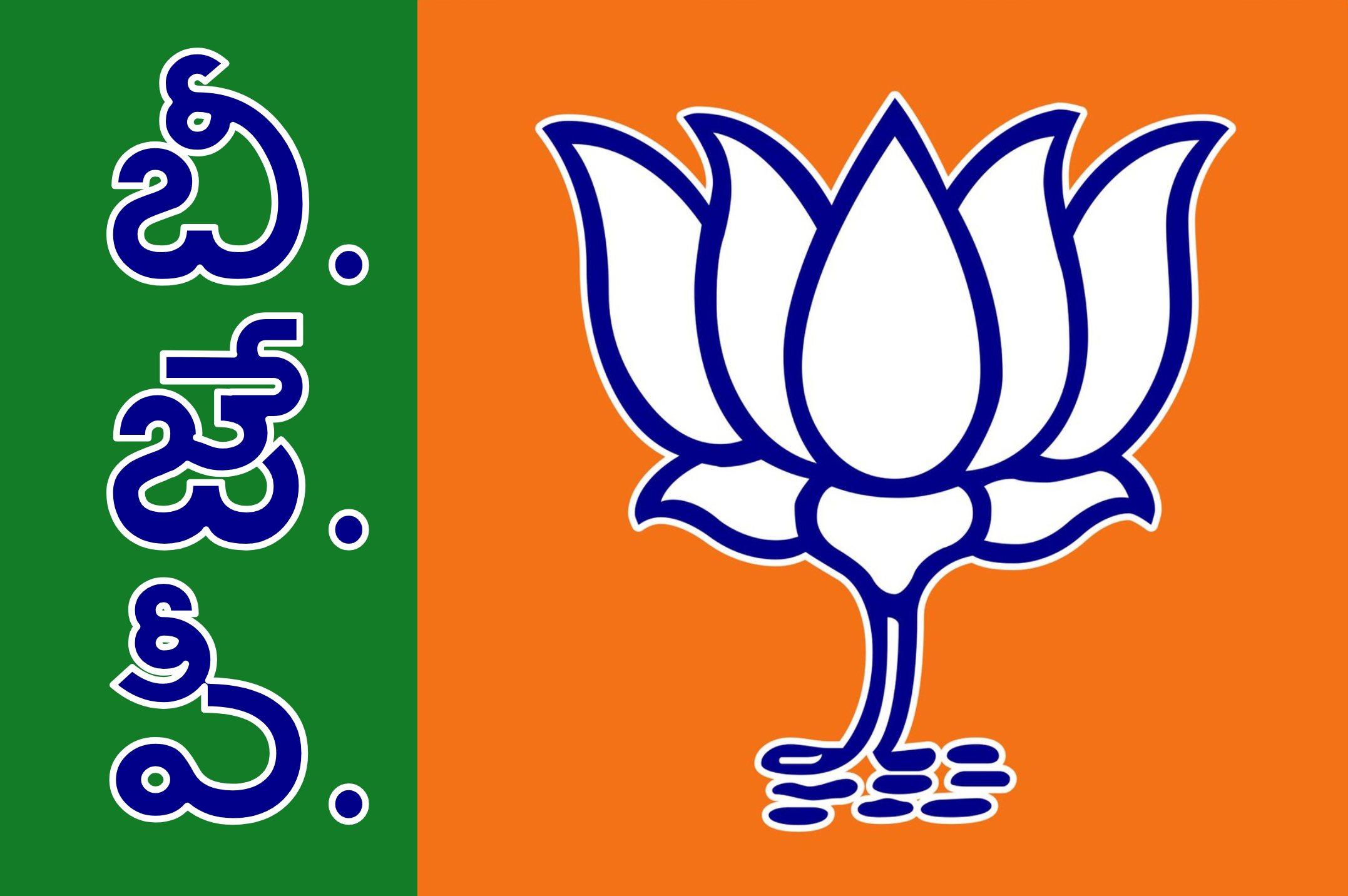

Website
- andhra.bjp.org

The Bharatiya Janata Party – Andhra Pradesh (BJP - Andhra Pradesh) is the affiliate of the Bharatiya Janata Party in the Indian state of Andhra Pradesh. The party is based in Vijayawada and is led by chair Daggubati Purandeswari. P. V. N. Madhav is currently appointed as the president of BJP Andhra Pradesh.

== Electoral Performance ==
=== Lok Sabha Elections in Andhra Pradesh ===
The Lok Sabha, also known as the House of the People, is the lower house of the bicameral Parliament of India, where the upper house is Rajya Sabha. Members of the Lok Sabha are elected by an adult universal suffrage and a first-past-the-post system to represent their respective constituencies, and they hold their seats for five years or until the body is dissolved by the president of India on the advice of the union council of ministers. The house meets in the Lok Sabha chamber of the Parliament House in New Delhi.

Election Year	Leader	Alliance	Seats			Popular vote			Sitting side
Election Year	Leader	Alliance	seats contested	seats won	+/- in seats	Votes	votes %	±pp	Sitting side
Lok Sabha Elections Performance in Andhra Pradesh
1984	Atal Bihari Vajpayee	TDP+	2	1 / 42	New entry	5,01,597	2.21%	New entry	Opposition
1989	Lal Krishna Advani	TDP+	2	0 / 42	▼1	5,67,124	1.97%	▼0.25%	Opposition
1991	Lal Krishna Advani	None	41	1 / 42	▲1	24,54,665	9.27%	▲7.66%	Opposition
1996	Atal Bihari Vajpayee	None	39	0 / 42	▼1	17,20,850	5.65%	▼3.89%	Opposition
1998	Atal Bihari Vajpayee	NDA	38	4 / 42	▲4	58,36,394	18.12%	▲12.65%	Government
1999	Atal Bihari Vajpayee	NDA	8	7 / 42	▲3	33,03,772	9.91%	▼8.40	Government
2004	Lal Krishna Advani	NDA	9	0 / 42	▼7	30,06,018	8.41%	▼1.49%	Opposition
2009	Lal Krishna Advani	NDA	41	0 / 42	-	15,77,512	3.75%	▼4.66%	Opposition
2014	Narendra Modi	NDA	12	2 / 25	▲2	2,077,079	7.22%	▲4.71%	Government
2019	Narendra Modi	NDA	25	0 / 25	▼2	3,03,985	0.96%	▼6.26%	Government
2024	Narendra Modi	NDA	6	3 / 25	▲3	37,50,687	11.28%	▲10.30%	Government

==== Elected Members to Lok Sabha election in Andhra Pradesh ====
Lok Sabha Members in Andhra Pradesh
S.No.	Portrait	Name	Election Years	Constituency		Popular Votes				Prime Minister
S.No.	Portrait	Name	Election Years	No.	Name	Votes	Vote %	Margin	Margin %	Prime Minister
2024 Lok Sabha Members in Andhra Pradesh
01.		C. M. Ramesh	2024	5	Anakapalle	7,62,069	57.50%	2,96,530	22.37%	Narendra Modi
02.		Daggubati Purandeswari (br.22 April 1959)	2024	8	Rajahmundry	7,26,515	54.82%	2,39,139	18.05%	Narendra Modi
03.		Bhupathi Raju Srinivasa Varma (br.22 April 1959)	2024	9	Narasapuram	7,07,343	57.46%	2,76,802	22.48%	Narendra Modi
2014 Lok Sabha Members in Andhra Pradesh
01.		Kambhampati Hari Babu (br.15 June 1953)	2014	4	Visakhapatnam	566,832	48.71%	90,488	7.78%	Narendra Modi
02.		Gokaraju Ganga Raju (br.14 June 1948)	2014	9	Narasapuram	540,306	49.61%	85,351	7.84%	Narendra Modi
1999 Lok Sabha Members in Andhra Pradesh
01.		Satyanarayana Rao (br.23 September 1921 - di.21 January 2011)	1999	8	Rajahmundry	411,956	51.73%	60,031	7.53%	Atal Bihari Vajpayee
02.		Krishnam Raju (br.20 January 1940)	1999	10	Narasapuram	421,099	59.78%	165,948	23.56%	Atal Bihari Vajpayee
03.		N. Venkataswamy (br.5 June 1931 - Di. 2012 )	1999	20	Tirupathi (SC)	386,478	48.89%	12,497	1.58%	Atal Bihari Vajpayee
04.		A. P. Jithender Reddy (br.26 June 1954 )	1999	29	Mahabubnagar	391,588	49.46%	50,895	6.43%	Atal Bihari Vajpayee
05.		Bandaru Dattatreya (br.12 June 1947)	1999	31	Secunderabad	506,626	52.19%	97,626	10.06%	Atal Bihari Vajpayee
06.		Ale Narendra (br.21 August 1946 - di.9 April 2014)	1999	33	Medak	400,244	48.20%	22,083	2.66%	Atal Bihari Vajpayee
07.		C. Vidyasagar Rao (br.12 February 1941 )	1999	37	Karimnagar	398,437	49.73%	19,370	2.42%	Atal Bihari Vajpayee
1998 Lok Sabha Members in Andhra Pradesh
01.		Krishnamraju U.V	1998	7	Kakinada	330,381	41.06%	67,799	8.43	Atal Bihari Vajpayee
02.		Girajala Venkata Swamy Naidu	1998	8	Rajahmundry	285,741	36.57%	9,912	1.27	Atal Bihari Vajpayee
03.		Bandaru Dattatreya (br.12 June 1947)	1998	31	Secunderabad	438,586	49.02%	185,910	20.78%	Atal Bihari Vajpayee
04.		C. Vidyasagar Rao (br.12 February 1941 )	1998	37	Karimnagar	329,030	42.83%	95,997	12.50%	Atal Bihari Vajpayee
1991 Lok Sabha Members in Andhra Pradesh
01.		Bandaru Dattatreya (br.12 June 1947)	1991	31	Secunderabad	253,924	48.19%	85,063	16.14%	Opposition
1984 Lok Sabha Members in Andhra Pradesh
01.		C. M. Ramesh	1984	38	Hanamkonda	263,762	52.40%	54,198	10.77%	Opposition

=== Legislative Assembly Elections in Andhra Pradesh ===
Election Year	Leader	Alliance	Seats			Popular vote			Result
Election Year	Leader	Alliance	seats contested	seats won	+/- in seats	Votes	votes %	±pp	Result
Legislative Assembly Elections Performance in Andhra Pradesh
Bharatiya Jana Sangh
1967	Jagannathrao Joshi	None	10	3 / 287	New entry	291,783	2.11%	New entry	Opposition
1972	V. Rama Rao	None	70	0 / 287	▼3	266,192	1.86%	▼0.25%	Lost
Bharatiya Janata Party
1983	P. V. Chalapathi Rao	None	80	3 / 294	New entry	582,464	2.76%	New entry	Opposition
1985	P. V. Chalapathi Rao	TDP+	10	8 / 294	▲5	372,978	1.32%	▼1.44%	Government (Alliance with TDP)
1989	Venkaiah Naidu	National Front	12	5 / 294	▼3	512,305	1.78%	▲0.46%	Opposition
1994	V. Rama Rao	None	280	3 / 294	▼2	1,210,878	3.89%	▲2.11%	Opposition
1999	C. Vidyasagar Rao	NDA	24	12 / 294	▲9	1,223,481	3.67%	▼0.22%	Government (Alliance with TDP)
2004	N. Indrasena Reddy	NDA	27	2 / 294	▼10	942,008	2.63%	▼1.04%	Opposition
2009	Bandaru Dattatreya	None	271	2 / 294	–	1,192,814	2.84%	▲0.2%	Opposition
2014	Kambhamhati Hari Babu	NDA	45	4 / 175	▲2	632,599	4.13%	▲1.29%	Government (Alliance with TDP)
2019	Kanna Lakshminarayana	None	173	0 / 175	▼4	263,849	0.84%	▼3.29%	Lost
2024	Daggubati Purandeswari	Kutami	10	8 / 175	▲8	953,977	2.83%	▲1.99%	Government (Alliance with TDP)

==== Elected Members to Legislative Assembly election in Andhra Pradesh ====
Legislative Assembly Members in Andhra Pradesh
S.No.	Portrait	Name	Election Years	Constituency			Popular Votes			
S.No.	Portrait	Name	Election Years	District	No.	Name	Votes	Vote %	Margin	Margin %
2024 Legislative Assembly Members in Andhra Pradesh
01.		Nadukuditi Eswara Rao (br.7 July)	2024	Srikakulam	7	Etcherla	112,770	54.59%	29,089	14.08%
02.		Penmetsa Vishnu Kumar Raju	2024	Visakhapatnam	23	Visakhapatnam North	108,801	57.81%	47,534	25.26%
03.		Nallamilli Ramakrishna Reddy	2024	East Godavari	40	Anaparthy	105,720	53.73%	20,850	10.59%
04.		Kamineni Srinivas	2024	Eluru	73	Kaikalur	109,280	60.38%	45,273	25.02%
05.		Sujana Chowdary (br.2 June 1961)	2024	NTR	79	Vijayawada West	105,669	61.49%	47,032	27.37%
06.		C. Adinarayana Reddy (br.4 June 1958)	2024	Kadapa	131	Jammalamadugu	109,640	51.43%	17,191	8.06%
07.		P. V. Parthasarathi	2024	Kurnool	146	Adoni	89,929	51.06%	18,164	10.32%
08.		Y. Satya Kumar Yadav (br.16 September 1971)	2024	Sri Sathya Sai	160	Dharmavaram	106,544	48.46%	3,734	1.7%
2014 Legislative Assembly Members in Andhra Pradesh
01.		Penmetsa Vishnu Kumar Raju	2014	Visakhapatnam	142	Visakhapatnam North	82,079	51.34%	18,240	11.9%
02.		Akula Satyanarayana	2014	East Godavari	169	Rajahmundry City	79,531	50.24%	26,377	16.67%
03.		Pydikondala Manikyala Rao (br.1 November 1961 - di.1 August 2020)	2014	West Godavari	181	Tadepalligudem	73,339	46.74%	14,073	8.97%
04.		Kamineni Srinivas	2014	Krishna	192	Kaikalur	88,092	53.80%	21,571	13.17%
2009 Legislative Assembly Members in Andhra Pradesh
01.		Endela Lakshminarayana (br.1 March 1963)	2009	Nizamabad	17	Nizamabad Urban	40,475	42.52%	11,015	11.57%
02.		G. Kishan Reddy (br.15 June 1960)	2009	Hyderabad	59	Amberpet	59,134	49.36%	27,243	22.74%
2004 Legislative Assembly Members in Andhra Pradesh
01.		Dorababu Pendem (br.12 January 1959)	2004	East Godavari	46	Pithapuram	46,527	50.47%	17,899	19.41%
02.		G. Kishan Reddy (br.15 June 1960)	2004	Hyderabad	207	Himayatnagar	55,338	49.83%	31,761	28.60%
1999 Legislative Assembly Members in Andhra Pradesh
01.		Kambhampati Hari Babu (br.15 June 1953)	1999	Visakhapatnam	24	Visakhapatnam-I	34,696	46.10%	8,411	11.18%
02.		Manepalli Ayyaji Vema	1999	East Godavari	57	Nagaram (SC)	42,113	48.16%	16,592	18.96%
03.		Kota Srinivasa Rao (br.10 July 1942 - di.13 July 2025)	1999	Krishna	78	Vijayawada East	57,047	49.44%	6,076	5.15%
04.		M. S. Parthasarathi (br.6 August 1961)	1999	Anantapur	161	Kadiri	56,686	52.07%	9,770	8.97%
05.		Ravula Ravindranath Reddy	1999	Mahabubnagar	196	Alampur	53,588	53.56%	30,254	30.24%
06.		K. Laxman (br. 3 July 1960)	1999	Hyderabad	206	Musheerabad	71,413	55.30%	18,567	14.38%
07.		N. Indrasena Reddy (br. 1 January 1953)	1999	Hyderabad	212	Malakpet	118,937	53.24%	49,320	22.10%
08.		Prem Singh Rathore	1999	Hyderabad	214	Maharajgunj	33,969	50.73%	3,416	5.10%
09.		K. Satyanarayana	1999	Medak	224	Sangareddy	70,522	42.10%	17,444	10.41%
10.		Gujjula Ramakishna Reddy	1999	Karimnagar	249	Peddapalle	56,099	45.49%	10,113	8.20%
11.		Thummala Venkata Ramana Reddy	1999	Karimnagar	258	Metpalli	56,160	54.59%	11,523	20.52%
12.		Marthineni Dharma Rao	1999	Warangal	270	Hanamkonda	52,572	37.33%	14,084	10.00%
1994 Legislative Assembly Members in Andhra Pradesh
01.		P. Ramaswamy	1994	Hyderabad	214	Maharajgunj	14,206	26.71%	197	0.37%
02.		Baddam Bal Reddy	1994	Hyderabad	215	Karwan	60,958	42.14%	13,293	9.19%
03.		Chennamaneni Vidyasagar Rao (br.12 February 1941)	1994	Karimnagar	258	Metpalli	47,211	47.79%	16,725	16.93%
1989 Legislative Assembly Members in Andhra Pradesh
01.		Ravula Ravindranath Reddy	1989	Mahbubnagar	196	Alampur	48,167	54.95%	10,372	11.83%
02.		Baddam Bal Reddy	1989	Hyderabad	215	Karwan	72,558	45.25%	3,036	1.89%
03.		Chennamaneni Vidyasagar Rao (br.12 February 1941)	1989	Karimnagar	258	Metpalli	41,221	49.52%	5,654	6.79%
04.		Takkallapalli Rajeshwar Rao	1989	Warangal	266	Wardhannapet	39,118	43.71%	10,066	11.25%
05.		Vonteru Jayapal	1989	Warangal	271	Parkal (SC)	21,734	24.30%	12,109	13.54%
1985 Legislative Assembly Members in Andhra Pradesh
01.		Ravula Ravindranath Reddy	1985	Mahabubnagar	196	Alampur	37,910	50.79%	12,201	16.35%
02.		Chennamaneni Vidyasagar Rao (br.21 August 1946 - di.9 April 2014)	1985	Hyderabad	207	Himayatnagar	38,941	19.27%	20,353	0.57%
03.		N. Indrasena Reddy (br.1 January 1953)	1985	Hyderabad	212	Malakpet	57,581	53.38%	17,791	16.23%
04.		Baddam Bal Reddy	1985	Hyderabad	215	Karwan	46,597	50.79%	9,777	10.66%
05.		Ramannagari Srinivasareddy	1985	Medak	228	Ramayampet	38,126	48.24%	1,726	2.18%
06.		Chennamaneni Vidyasagar Rao (br.12 February 1941)	1985	Karimnagar	258	Metpalli	14,986	22.88%	372	0.57%
07.		Vannala Sreeramulu	1985	Warangal	267	Waradhanapet	39,097	60.46%	13,526	20.92%
08.		V Jaypal	1985	Warangal	272	Parkal (SC)	34,926	58.70%	17,132	29.88%
1983 Legislative Assembly Members in Andhra Pradesh
01.		Venkaiah Naidu (br.1 July 1949)	1983	Nellore	124	Udayagiri	42,694	59.53%	20,500	30.95%
02.		N. Indrasena Reddy (br.1 January 1953)	1983	Hyderabad	212	Malakpet	21,937	27.00%	2,597	23.80%
03.		Chandupatla Janga Reddy (br.18 November 1935 - di.5 February 2022)	1983	Warangal	271	Shyampet	30,605	48.07%	4,664	40.74%

== Leadership ==
=== List of State President of Bharatiya Janata Party, Andhra Pradesh ===
President of Bharatiya Janata Party, Andhra Pradesh
S.No.	Portrait	Name (born /death)	Term in office		
S.No.	Portrait	Name (born /death)	Assumed office	Left office	Time in office
President of Bharatiya Janata Party, Andhra Pradesh
1		D.Suryaprakash Reddy	1980	1982	2 years, 0 days
2		P. V. Chalapathi Rao	1982	1986	4 years, 0 days
3		Bangaru Laxman (br. 17 March 1939 - di. 1 March 2014 )	1986	1988	2 years, 0 days
4		Venkaiah Naidu (br. 1 July 1949)	1988	1993	5 years, 0 days
5		V. Rama Rao (br. 12 December 1935 - di. 17 January 2016)	1993	1997	4 years, 0 days
5		V. Rama Rao (br. 12 December 1935 - di. 17 January 2016)	1999	2001	2 years, 0 days
6		Bandaru Dattatreya (br. 12 June 1947)	1997	1998	1 year, 0 days
6		Bandaru Dattatreya (br. 12 June 1947)	2006	2010	4 years, 0 days
7		C. Vidyasagar Rao (br. 12 February 1941)	1998	1999	1 year, 0 days
8		Chilakam Ramachandra Reddy	2001	2003	2 years, 0 days
9		N. Indrasena Reddy (br. 1 January 1953)	2003	2006	3 years, 0 days
10		G. Kishan Reddy (br. 15 June 1960)	8 March 2010	2 June 2014	4 years, 86 days
11		Kambhampati Hari Babu (br. 15 June 1953)	2 June 2014	13 May 2018	3 years, 345 days
12		Kanna Lakshminarayana (br. 13 August 1954)	13 May 2018	28 July 2020	2 years, 76 days
13		Somu Veerraju (br. 15 October 1957)	28 July 2020	4 July 2023	2 years, 341 days
14		Daggubati Purandeswari (br. 22 April 1959)	4 July 2023	30 June 2025	1 year, 361 days
15		P. V. N. Madhav (br. 10 August 1973)	1 July 2025	Incumbent	1 year, 79 days

The party currently holds 2 seats in the Rajya Sabha and 3 seats in the Lok Sabha from the state, while it holds 1 seat in the Andhra Pradesh Legislative Council and 8 seats in the Andhra Pradesh Legislative Assembly.

== See also ==
- Bharatiya Janata Party
- National Democratic Alliance
- State units of the Bharatiya Janata Party
