= 2026 Andhra Pradesh rural local bodies elections =

Elections to rural local bodies in Andhra Pradesh

2026 Andhra Pradesh rural local body elections
- 5 November 2026–2 December 2026

659 Zilla Parishad Territorial Constituencies (ZPTCs); 9,821 Mandal Parishad Territorial Constituencies (MPTCs); 13,167 Grama Panchayats
- Registered: 2,61,52,377
- Turnout: 70.72 (▲9.81%; ZPTC/MPTC)
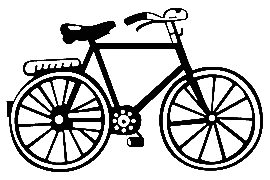

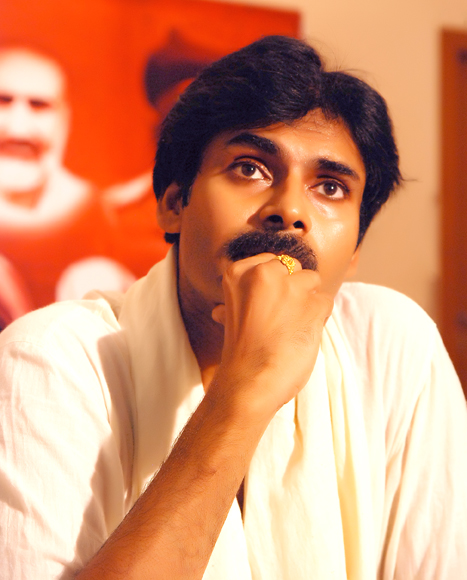

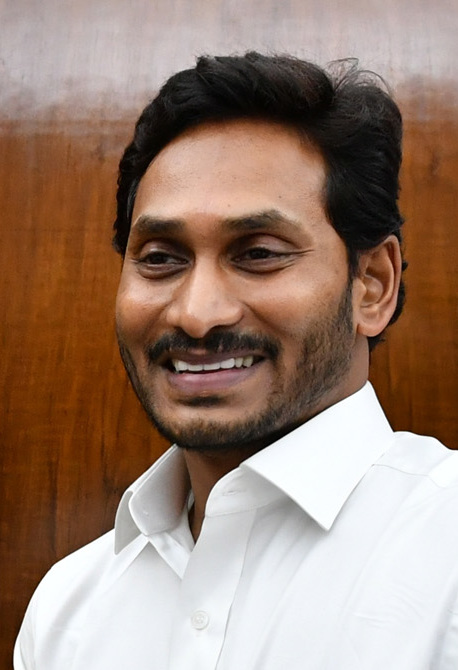

Leader	Palla Srinivasa Rao	Pawan Kalyan	Y. S. Jagan Mohan Reddy
Party	TDP	JSP	YSRCP
Alliance	Kutami	Kutami	None
Leader	P. V. N. Madhav
Party	Bharatiya Janata Party
Alliance	Kutami

Elections to rural local bodies (ZPTCs, MPTCs and Grama Panchayats) are being held in the Indian state of Andhra Pradesh. The ZPTC and MPTC election was held on 5 November 2026. Elections to 13,167 grama panchayats across the state will be held in three phases on 26 November 2026, 29 November 2026 and 2 December 2026.

== Background ==
In 2022, Zilla Parishads in Andhra Pradesh were reorganized. However, the then-current chairmen and vice-chairmen were to remain in their existing seats until 2026.

== Election schedule ==
Election schedule for MPTC, ZPTC and Grama Panchayats is released on 19 October 2026. The ZPTC and MPTC election was rescheduled from 3 November 2026 to 5 November 2026 due to reschedule of the urban local bodies election.

=== ZPTC and MPTC Election schedule ===
Event	Date
Date for Notification	19 October 2026
Date for Nominations	21 October 2026
Last Date for filing Nominations	23 October 2026
Date for scrutiny of nominations	24 October 2026
Appeal Date for scrutiny of nominations	25 October 2026
Appeal disposal Date for scrutiny of nominations	26 October 2026
Last day for withdrawal of candidatures	27 October 2026
Date of poll	5 November 2026 (Note: Rescheduled from the earlier announced date of 3 November 2026)
Date of re-poll, if any	6 November 2026
Date of counting	7 November 2026

Elections to Grama Panchayats will be conducted in 3 phases.

=== Grama Panchayat Phase – 1 ===
Event	Date
Date for Notifications	13 November 2026
Last Date for filing Nominations	17 November 2026
Last day for withdrawal of candidatures	21 November 2026
Date of poll and counting	26 November 2026
Date of re-poll, if any	27 November 2026

=== Grama Panchayat Phase – 2 ===
Event	Date
Date for Notifications	16 November 2026
Last Date for filing Nominations	20 November 2026
Last day for withdrawal of candidatures	24 November 2026
Date of poll and counting	29 November 2026
Date of re-poll, if any	30 November 2026

=== Grama Panchayat Phase – 3 ===
Event	Date
Date for Notifications	19 November 2026
Last Date for filing Nominations	23 November 2026
Last day for withdrawal of candidatures	27 November 2026
Date of poll and counting	2 December 2026
Date of re-poll, if any	3 December 2026

== Parties and alliances ==
Alliance/Party		Flag	Symbol	Leader
Kutami	Telugu Desam Party			N. Chandrababu Naidu
Kutami	Janasena Party			Pawan Kalyan
Kutami	Bharatiya Janata Party			P. V. N. Madhav
YSR Congress Party				Y. S. Jagan Mohan Reddy
Communist Party of India (Marxist)				V. Srinivasa Rao
Communist Party of India				Gujjula Eshwarayya
INDIA	Indian National Congress			Y. S. Sharmila

== Voting ==
Event	Turnout (%)
ZPTC / MPTC	70.72
GP Phase – 1	
GP Phase – 2	
GP Phase – 3	
Total	

=== ZPTC / MPTC election ===
The voter turnout by the end of polling, that is, 5pm on 5 November 2026, is reported to be 67.24%. The state election commission released the revised final voter turnout list on 6 November 2026. The final total voter turnout is 70.72% statewide.

District	Turnout (%)
Srikakulam	65.51
Vizianagaram	76.21
Alluri Sitharama Raju	62.01
Parvathipuram Manyam	67.13
Polavaram	65.48
Visakhapatnam	82.51
Anakapalli	75.58
Kakinada	68.94
East Godavari	71.56
Konaseema	66.33
West Godavari	69.73
Eluru	75.52
Krishna	73.21
NTR	75.53
Guntur	73.12
Palnadu	70.93
Bapatla	67.47
Prakasam	68.53
Markapuram	67.69
Nellore	70.62
Tirupati	68.67
Chittoor	76.30
Annamayya	69.19
Kadapa	71.78
Sri Sathya Sai	73.71
Ananthapuram	64.38
Kurnool	68.29
Nandyal	74.27
Total	70.72

== Results ==
=== District-wise ZPTCs ===
District	ZPTCs					
District	ZPTCs	Kutami			YSRCP	Others
District	ZPTCs	TDP	JSP	BJP	YSRCP	Others
Srikakulam	30					
Vizianagaram	27					
Alluri Sitharama Raju	11					
Parvathipuram Manyam	15					
Polavaram	12					
Visakhapatnam	4					
Anakapalli	24					
Kakinada	20					
East Godavari	21					
Konaseema	19					
West Godavari	20					
Eluru	27					
Krishna	26	19	4	1	1	1
NTR	16	13	0	1	2	0
Guntur	13					
Palnadu	28					
Bapatla	20					
Prakasam	27					
Markapuram	21					
Nellore	35					
Tirupati	35					
Chittoor	27					
Annamayya	25					
Kadapa	39					
Sri Sathya Sai	32					
Ananthapuram	31					
Kurnool	26					
Nandyal	28					
Total	659					

=== District-wise MPTCs ===
District	MPTCs					
District	MPTCs	Kutami			YSRCP	Others
District	MPTCs	TDP	JSP	BJP	YSRCP	Others
Srikakulam	542					
Vizianagaram	449					
Alluri Sitharama Raju	172					
Parvathipuram Manyam	226					
Polavaram	101					
Visakhapatnam	53					
Anakapalli	427					
Kakinada	401					
East Godavari	412					
Konaseema	379					
West Godavari	371					
Eluru	454					
Krishna	352					
NTR	280					
Guntur	200					
Palnadu	419					
Bapatla	300					
Prakasam	371					
Markapuram	274	205	22	1	50	2
Nellore	440					
Tirupati	444					
Chittoor	370					
Annamayya	196					
Kadapa	407 (Note: No nominations for Sugumanchipalli–1 and Sugumanchipalli –2 MPTCs of Kondapuram mandal in Kadapa district.; All Nominations were rejected in the Krishnagiri MPTC, Banaganapalle mandal, Nandyal district)					
Sri Sathya Sai	397					
Ananthapuram	450					
Kurnool	432					
Nandyal	377					
Total	9821					

== See also ==
- Elections in Andhra Pradesh
- 2026 elections in India
- List of rural local bodies in Andhra Pradesh
