= Shanti Ram Nepal =

Long distance marathon runner

Shanti Ram Nepal is a long-distance marathon runner from Samdong, East Sikkim, Sikkim, India who completed a 500 km footrace in 100 hrswhich is starting from Gangtok at 11.00 am on August 25, 2014, he proceeded via Mangan-Ravangla-Gyalshing-Melli route to finish the race at Gangtok at 1.00 pm on August 28, 2014, and was listed longest/fastest run on hill roads in the Limca book of records.

== Sikkim to New Delhi Long Run ==
On July 23, 2016, at 10:30 am he started his long-distance run from Raj Bhavan in Gangtok to New Delhi which is around 2000 km to spread the message of Organic farming in Sikkim, Swachh Bharat Abhiyan and Beti Bachao, Beti Padhao Yojana.
