= Daggubati Purandeswari =

Indian politician (born 1959)

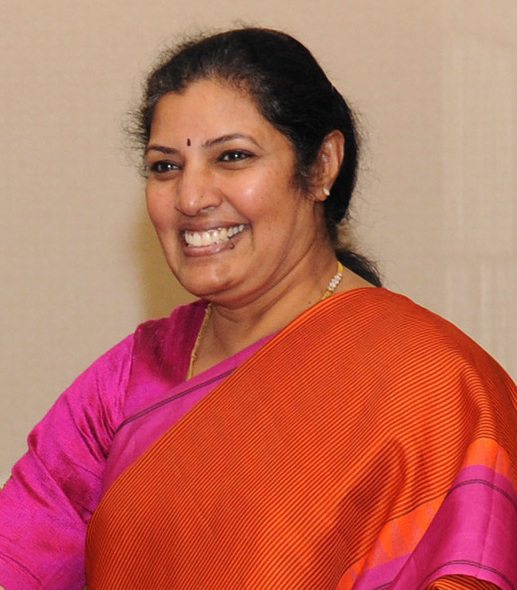

13th President of the Bharatiya Janata Party, Andhra Pradesh
- In office 4 July 2023 – 30 June 2025
- National President: J. P. Nadda
- Preceded by: Somu Veerraju
- Succeeded by: P. V. N. Madhav

Union Minister of State for Commerce and Industry
- In office 28 October 2012 – 11 March 2014 served along with S. Jagathrakshakan (2012-2013); E. M. Sudarsana Natchiappan (2013-2014)
- Prime Minister: Manmohan Singh
- Minister: Anand Sharma
- Preceded by: Jyotiraditya Scindia
- Succeeded by: Nirmala Sitharaman (Mos, I/C) (2014-2017); C. R. Chaudhary (2017-2019)

37th Union Minister of State for Human Resource Development
- In office 29 January 2006 – 28 October 2012 served along with E. Ahamed (2011-2012)
- Prime Minister: Manmohan Singh
- Minister: Arjun Singh; Kapil Sibal
- Preceded by: Kanti Singh
- Succeeded by: Jitin Prasada

Member of Parliament, Lok Sabha
- Incumbent
- Assumed office 4 June 2024
- Preceded by: Margani Bharat
- Constituency: Rajahmundry
- In office 1 June 2009 – 28 May 2014
- Preceded by: Nedurumalli Janardhana Reddy
- Succeeded by: Kambhampati Hari Babu
- Constituency: Visakhapatnam
- In office 29 May 2004 – 31 May 2009
- Preceded by: D. Ramanaidu
- Succeeded by: Panabaka Lakshmi
- Constituency: Bapatla

Personal details
- Born: Nandamuri Purandeswari; 22 April 1959 (age 67) Madras, Madras State, (present-day Chennai, Tamil Nadu) India
- Party: Bharatiya Janata Party (2014-present)
- Other political affiliations: Indian National Congress (2004-2014)
- Spouse: Daggubati Venkateswara Rao (m. 1979)
- Relations: Nandamuri–Nara family
- Children: 2
- Parent: N. T. Rama Rao (father)
- Education: B.A. (Literature) and Graduate in Gemology
- Alma mater: South Indian Educational Trust Women College (Chennai); Gemmological Institute of India Profession Political & Social Worker
- As of 14 September, 2025

Daggubati Purandeswari (born 22 April 1959) is an Indian politician from the state of Andhra Pradesh. She served as president of Bharatiya Janata Party (BJP), Andhra Pradesh. She is currently serving as a Member of Parliament of Lok Sabha representing the Rajahmundry Lok Sabha constituency.

== Early life and education ==
She was born 22 April 1959 to N. T. Rama Rao and Basavatarakam. She did her schooling from Sacred Heart Matriculation Higher Secondary School, Church Park, Chennai. She is their second daughter and has 7 brothers and 3 sisters. She has a Bachelor of Arts from the South Indian Educational Trust and Women College (Chennai) (renamed as the Bashir Ahmed Sayeed College for Women) in literature in 1979, followed by a Diploma in gemmology at the Gemmological Institute of India in 1996. Later she established Hyderabad Institute of Gem and Jewellery in 1997. She can read, write and speak five languages, English, Telugu, Tamil, Hindi and French. She is versatile in the Indian dance form Kuchipudi. She married Daggubati Venkateswara Rao on 9 May 1979 and they have a daughter, Nivedita and son, Hitesh Chenchuram.

== Political career ==
Purandeswari is the state president of the Bharatiya Janata Party, Andhra Pradesh since 2023. She had served as the Minister of State in the Ministry of Human Resource Development in 2009 and MoS in the Ministry of Commerce and Industry in 2012.

She represented the Visakhapatnam constituency of Andhra Pradesh as a Member of Parliament for Indian National Congress in the 15th Lok Sabha. She had previously represented the Bapatla constituency in the 14th Lok Sabha from the Indian National Congress. She joined the Bharatiya Janata Party on 7 March 2014 after resigning from the Indian National Congress, as a mark of protest against the bifurcation of Andhra Pradesh that was favoured by the then United Progressive Alliance government.

In 2014, Purandareswari fought the Lok Sabha election on a BJP ticket from Rajampet and lost. She was appointed the BJP Mahila Morcha Prabhari. On July 4, 2023, she was appointed as the President of the Bharatiya Janata Party, Andhra Pradesh.

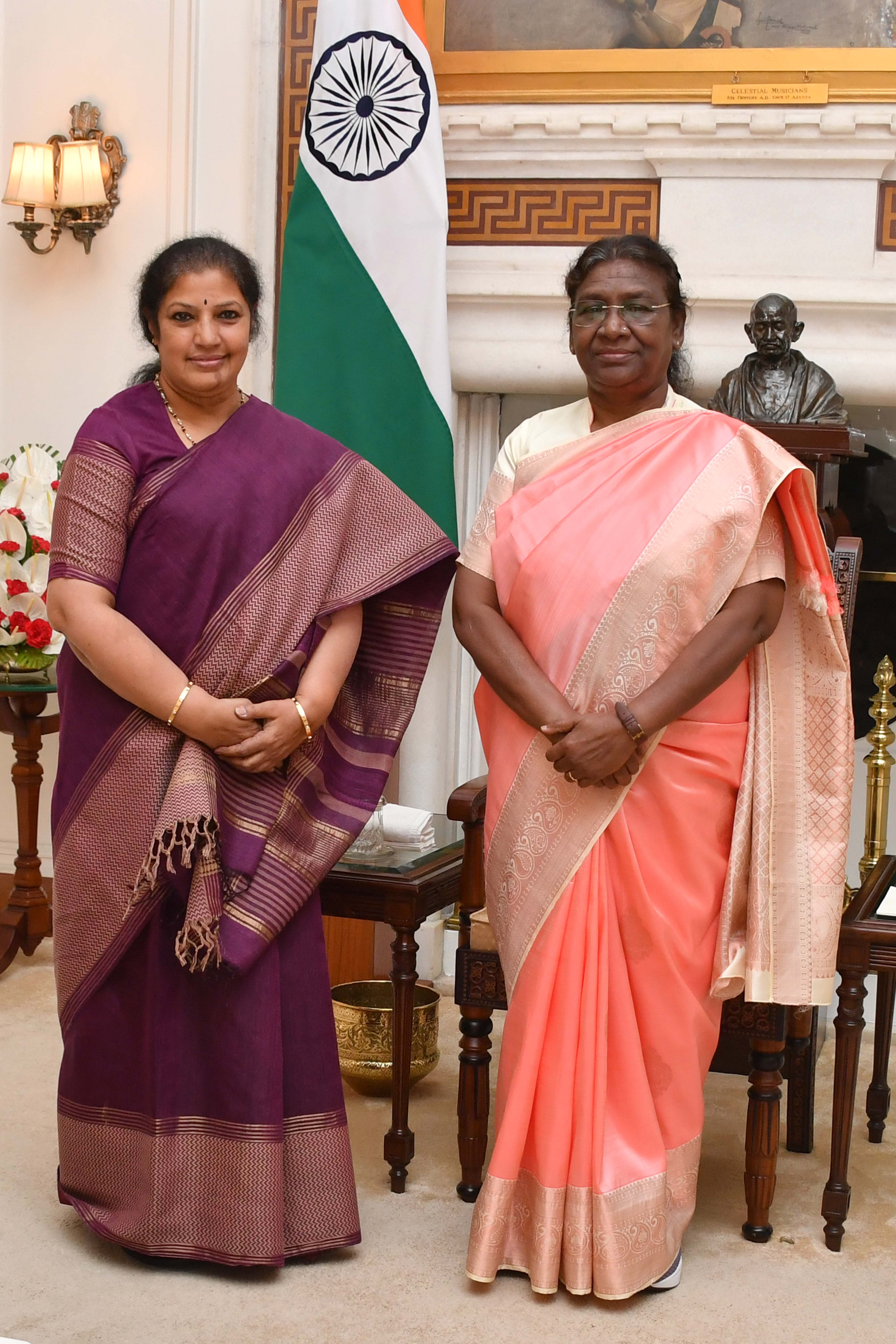
Purandeshwari (left) meeting with the President of India, Droupadi Murmu at Rashtrapati Bhavan

She has been elected as a Member of Parliament from Rajahmundry Lok Sabha constituency in 2024 Indian General elections.

Her eloquence, articulation and impassioned speeches have earned her the title of the "Sushma Swaraj of the South".

== Electoral History ==
=== Lok Sabha ===
Year	Constituency	Party	Votes	%	Opponent	Party	Votes	%	Result	Margin	%
2004	Bapatla	INC	411,099	55.90	Daggubati Ramanaidu	TDP	317,017	43.10	Won	+94,082	+12.80
2009	Visakhapatnam	INC	368,812	36.43	Palla Srinivasa Rao	PRP	302,126	29.85	Won	+66,686	+6.58
2014	Rajampet	BJP	426,990	36.77	P. V. Midhun Reddy	YSRCP	601,752	51.82	Lost	−174,762	−15.05
2019	Visakhapatnam	BJP	33,892	2.73	M. V. V. Satyanarayana	YSRCP	436,906	35.24	Lost	−403,014	−32.51
2024	Rajahmundry	BJP	726,515	55.85	Dr. Guduri Srinivas	YSRCP	487,376	37.47	Won	+239,139	+18.38
