= Konka =

Konka can refer to:

== Geography ==
- Konka (river), a river in Kherson Oblast, Ukraine
- Konka, an alternative name for Kinska, a river in Kherson Oblast, Ukraine
- Minya Konka, an alternate name for Mount Gongga, China

== People and groups ==
- Konka Group, a Chinese electronics company
- Konka Meenakshi Naidu (born 1951), Indian politician
