= Nellore Municipal Corporation =

Local civic body in Nellore, Andhra Pradesh, India

Nellore Municipal Corporation (NMC) Nellūru nagara pālaka Sanstha నెల్లూరు నగర పాలక సంస్థ
- Official emblem

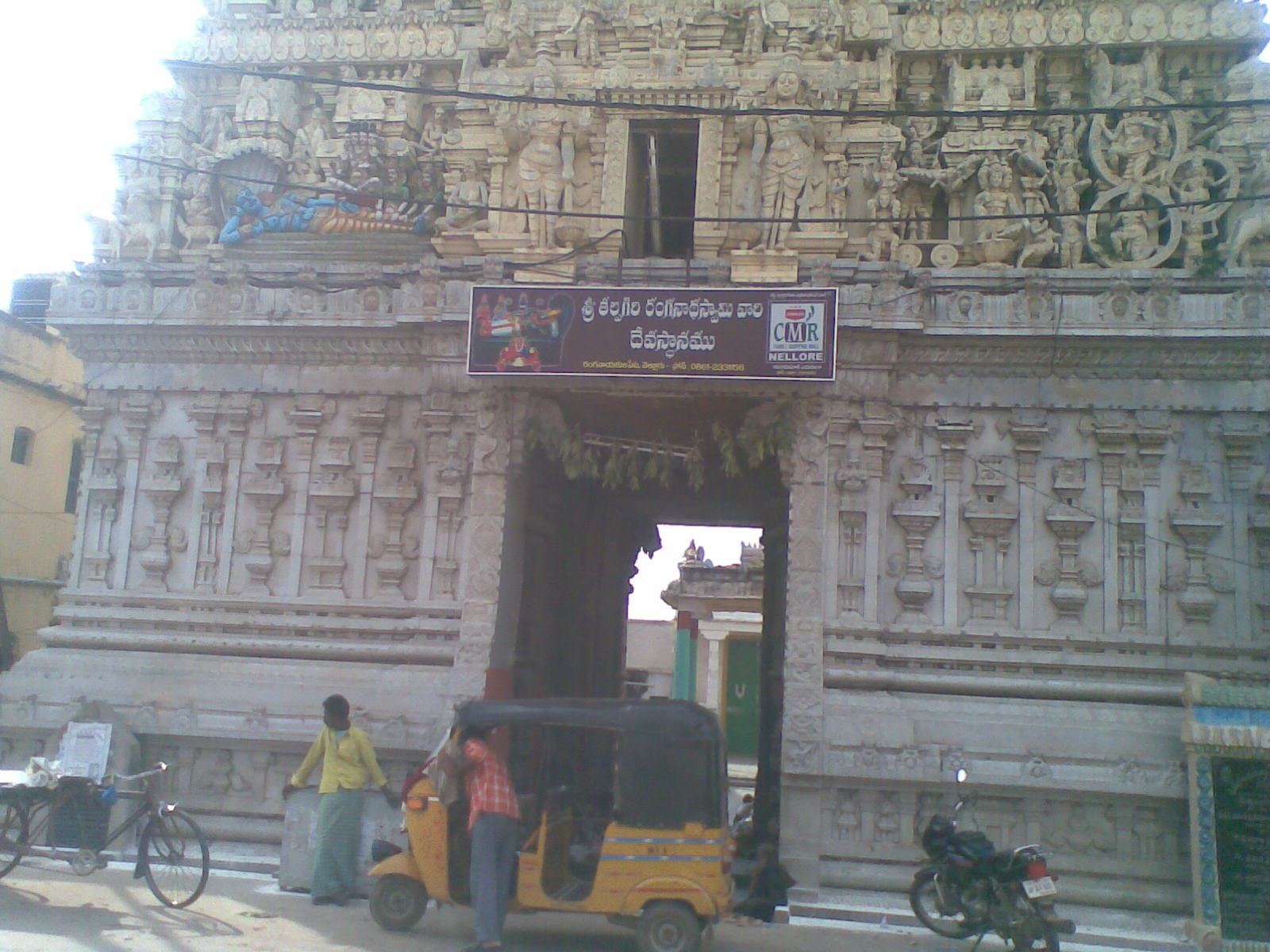
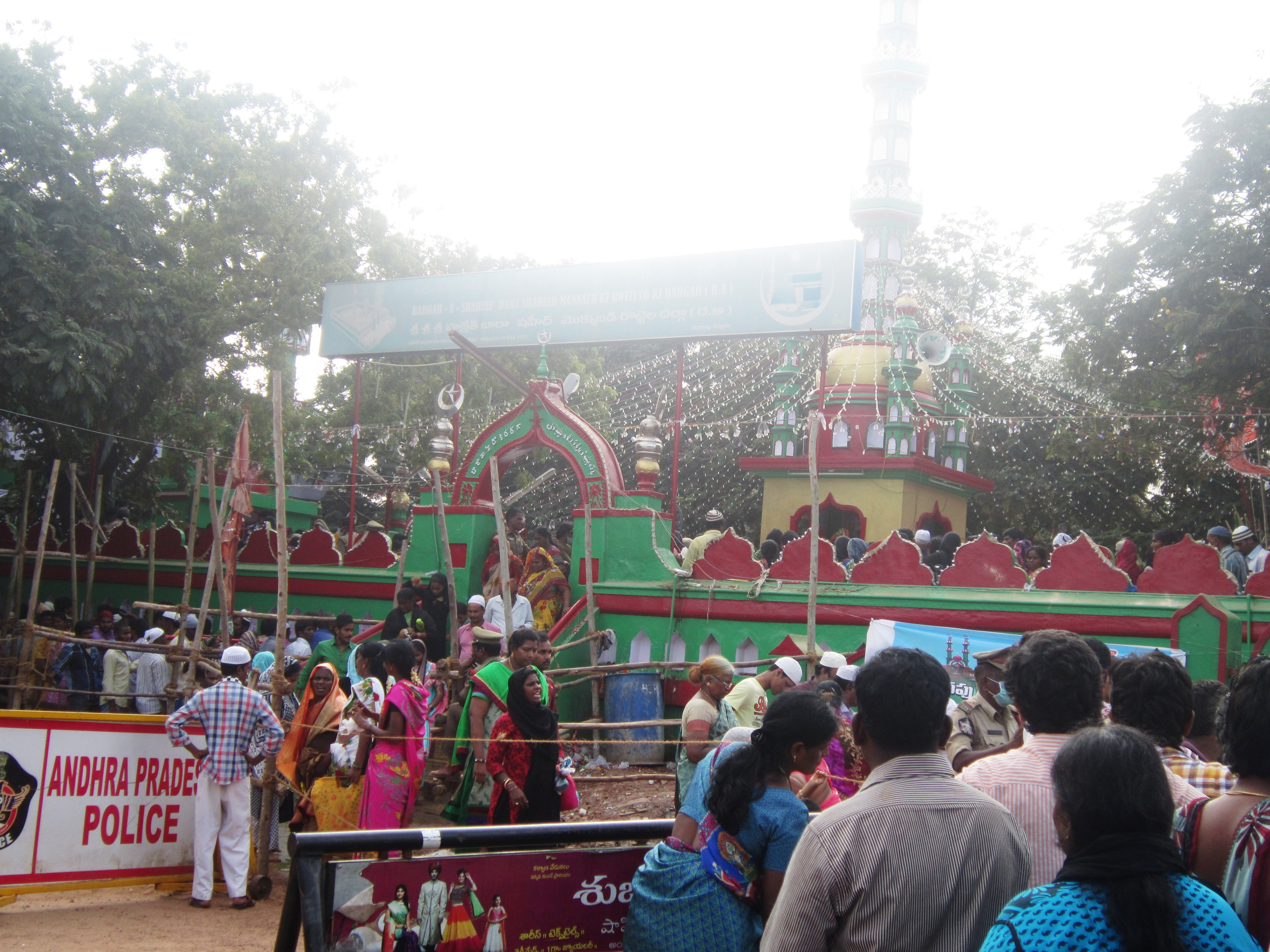
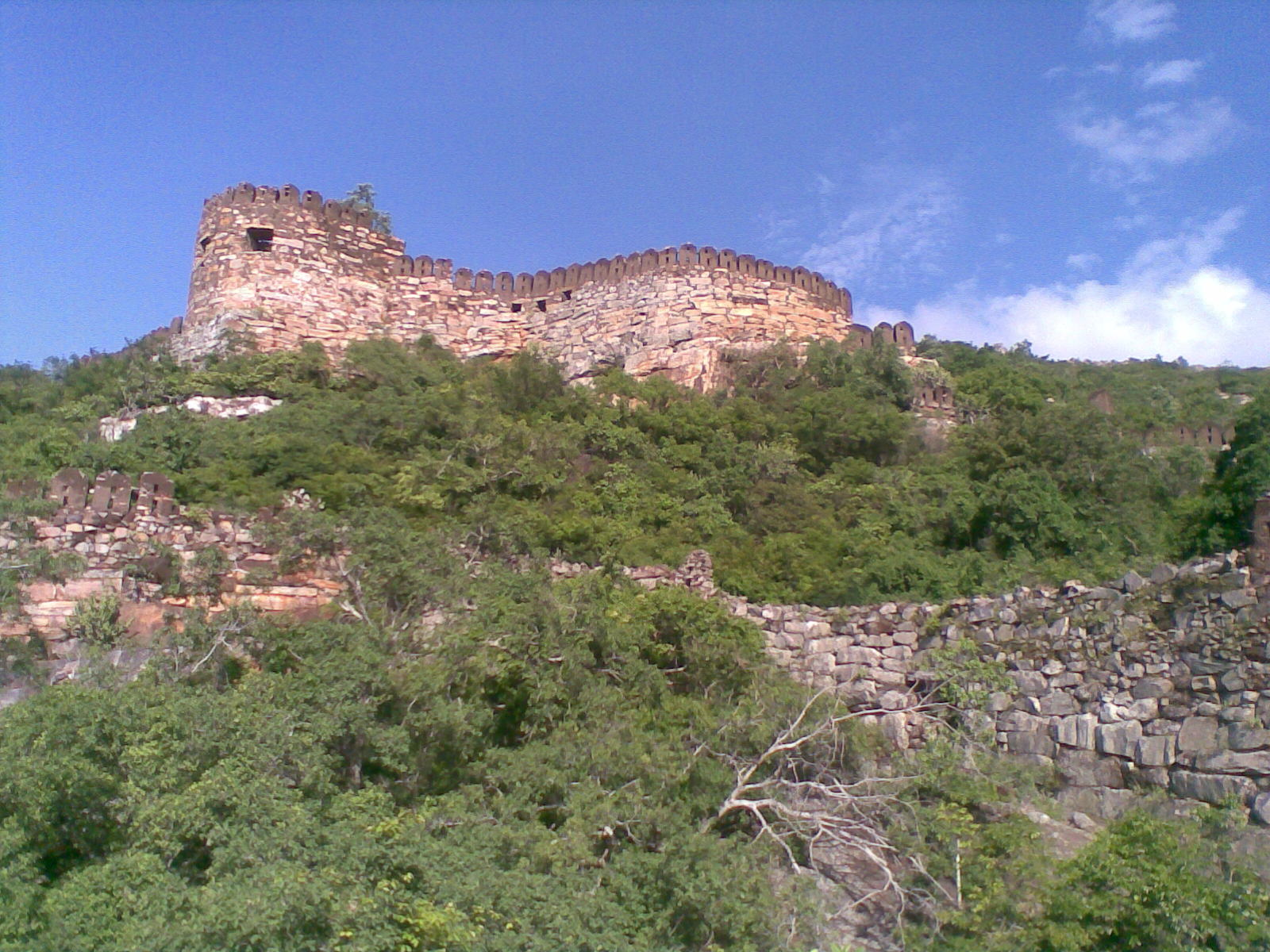
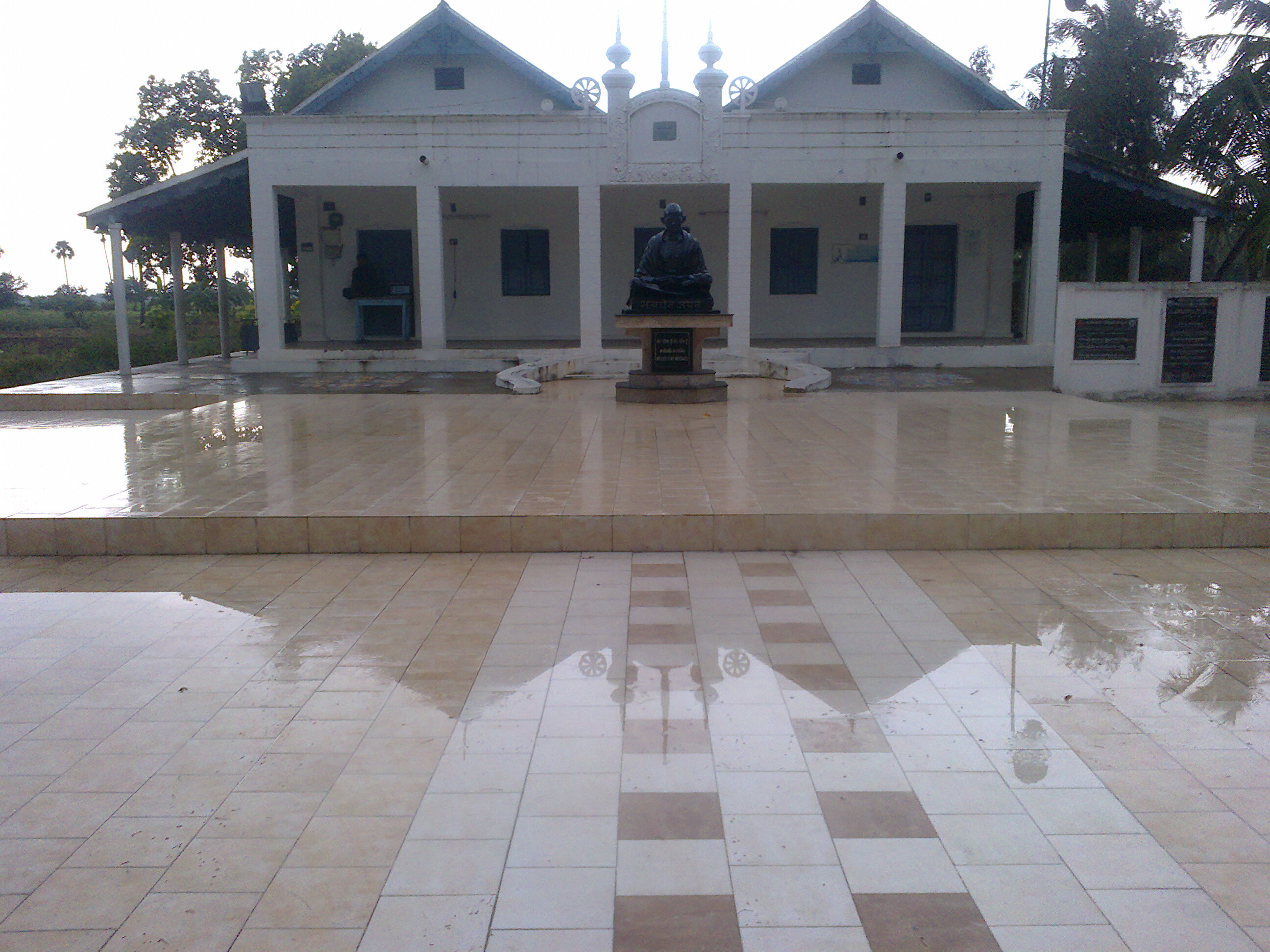
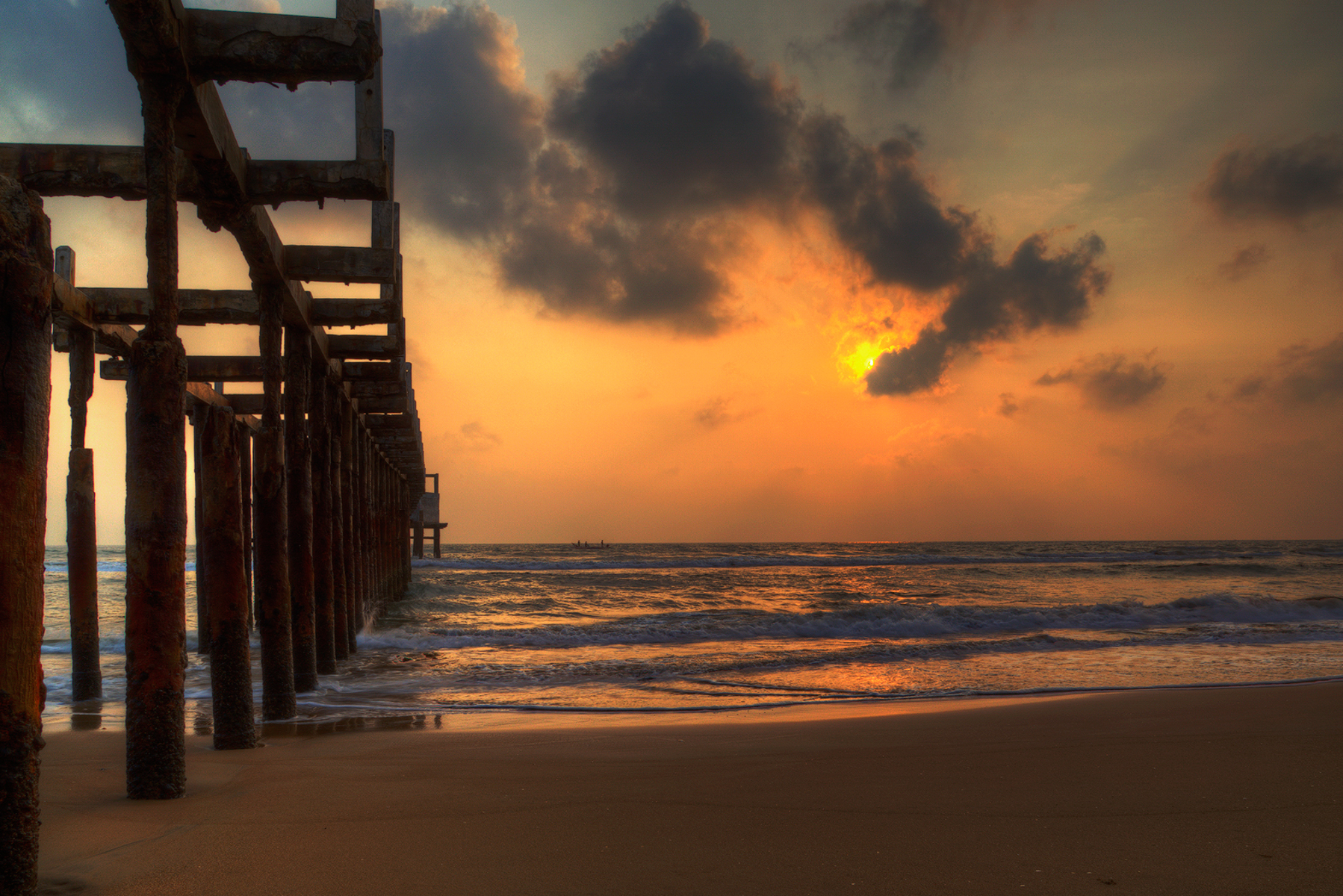

Type
- Type: Municipal Corporation

History
- Founded: 1866 (160 years ago) (as Nellore Municipality); 2004 (22 years ago) (upgraded to Municipal Corporation)

Leadership
- Mayor: Poluboina Roopkumar Yadav, TDP
- Deputy Mayor: Vacant (since 18 March 2026)
- Municipal Commissioner: Y.O. Nandan

Structure
- Seats: 72 wards
- Political groups: Government (69) Kutami (69): TDP (56); JSP (8); BJP (5); Opposition (3): YSRCP (1); IND (2)

Elections
- Voting system: FPTP
- Last election: 1 November 2026
- Next election: 2031

Meeting place
- Dr. A. P. J. Abdul Kalam Council Hall, Dargamitta, Nellore

Website
- nellore.cdma.ap.gov.in

Nellore Municipal Corporation is the civic body of Nellore, Andhra Pradesh, India. It has a population of 6,00,869 (2011 census). It is located 279 km from the capital city. It was established as Nellore Municipality in 1866 and was constituted as a municipal corporation in 2004. There are two zones and 72 election wards in this corporation. Primacy of Nellore City accounts for 65% of the urban population of Nellore district.

== History ==
Nellore's municipal administration dates back to the 19th century, when the town was established as a municipality on 1 November 1866 under the Madras Towns Improvement Act of 1865. The introduction of the Madras District Municipalities Act in 1884 brought municipal administration under a new legislative framework, marking a further stage in the development of local governance in the town.

Over the following decades, the municipality's responsibilities expanded to cover essential civic services, including drinking water supply, drainage, sanitation, road maintenance, street lighting and solid waste management. On 18 October 2004, Nellore Municipality was upgraded to municipal corporation status, with an expanded role in managing urban infrastructure and public services.

Following its elevation, the corporation undertook various urban development initiatives relating to water supply, underground drainage, road infrastructure, sanitation and public amenities, including projects under central and state government urban development programmes.

== Administration ==
The corporation is administered by an elected body, headed by the mayor. The present mayor of the city is P. Roopkumar Yadav and the commissioner of the city is Y.O. Nandan.

== Jurisdiction ==
The corporation is spread over an area of 48.39 km^{2} (18.68 sq mi). The corporation is divided into administrative zones and electoral wards for municipal administration and local representation. Following the 2026 delimitation, the corporation comprises 72 wards.

== List of mayors ==
Nellore Municipal Corporation (NMC)
Sno.	Mayor	DY Mayor	Term start	Term end	Party	Notes
1.	P.Sailaja	M.Dwarakanadh	2005	2010	Indian National Congress	First Mayor of NMC
Elections not held (2010 - 2014)						Delimitation delays, Samaikyandhra Movement
2.	Shaik Abdul Aziz	M.Dwarakanadh	2014	2019	YSR Congress Party	Shaik Abdul Aziz Joined TDP officially in 2015But not deputy mayor
Elections not held (2019 - 2021)						Corona virus pandemic
3.	P.Sravanthi	P.Roopkumar Yadav; Md.Khaleel	2021	2025	YSR Congress Party	Resigned in 2025
4.	P.Roopkumar Yadav	Syed Tahseen	2025	Feb 2026	Telugu Desam Party	Acted as In-charge Mayor And Deputy Mayor Election held after change of ruling in State Government in 2024.
5.	D.Sujatha	Syed Tahseen	Feb 2026	March 2026	Telugu Desam Party	Mayor seat is vacant from March 18,2026 till recent elections held in 2026 because of the end of tenure of Elected Representatives and take over of special officer rule till new representatives are elected.
6.	P.Roopkumar Yadav	To be elected on 23rd Nov 2026	3rd Nov 2026	Incumbent	Telugu Desam Party	First mayor who was elected by FPTP popular vote

== Wards (As of official Results declared by State Election Commission on 4th November 2026) ==
Ward No.	Reservation	Incumbent councillor	Incumbent party
1	BC	Kudumula Chiranjeevi	Telugu Desam Party
2	BC	Mohammad Javeed	Telugu Desam Party
3	BC (Women)	Mekala Madhu Pavani	Telugu Desam Party
4	ST (Women)	Manikala Nagamani	Telugu Desam Party
5	SC	Ingilela Abraham	Telugu Desam Party
6	BC	Battala Sreekanth	Jana Sena Party
7	BC (Women)	Lakshmi Sirigiri	Bharatiya Janata Party
8	BC	Mamidala Madhu	Telugu Desam Party
9	ST	Thaluri Sasi Kumar	Telugu Desam Party
10	Women (General)	Kinnera Koteswari	Telugu Desam Party
11	Women (General)	Konda Geethika	Telugu Desam Party
12	Unreserved	Kinnera Sagar	Telugu Desam Party
13	Women (General)	Nelvvai Kamakshi	YSR Congress Party
14	Unreserved	Kuvvarapu Balaji	Telugu Desam Party
15	Women (General)	Gurram Kejiya Kumari	Jana Sena Party
16	Women (General)	Kamma Kalyani	Telugu Desam Party
17	Unreserved	Kakarla Thirumala Naidu	Telugu Desam Party
18	Women (General)	Goddeti Lakshmi	Telugu Desam Party
19	Unreserved	Kartam Prathap Reddy	Telugu Desam Party
20	Unreserved	Ganesam Venkateswarlu	Telugu Desam Party
21	Women (General)	Gunukula Vijaya Lakshmi	Jana Sena Party
22	Unreserved	Vuchi Bhuvanswari Prasad	Telugu Desam Party
23	SC	Tirupati Kayala	Telugu Desam Party
24	SC (Women)	Utukuru Chandu Priya	Telugu Desam Party
25	Unreserved	Datla Chakravardhan Reddy	Telugu Desam Party
26	Women (General)	Koram Gayatri	Telugu Desam Party
27	Unreserved	Nukaraju Madan Kumar Reddy	Telugu Desam Party
28	SC	Nannam Srinivasulu	Telugu Desam Party
29	Unreserved	Muralikrishna Nagisetti	Jana Sena Party
30	Unreserved	Nune Rushikesh Yadav	Jana Sena Party
31	Unreserved	Errabolu Rajesh	Bharatiya Janata Party
32	Unreserved	Mekala Madhu	Telugu Desam Party
33	SC (Women)	Arava Santhi	Telugu Desam Party
34	BC (Women)	Bonaboina Chamundeswari	Telugu Desam Party
35	Unreserved	Duddugunta Srinivasulu Reddy	Telugu Desam Party
36	Women (General)	Budda Supraja	Telugu Desam Party
37	BC	Shaik Abdul Rasool	Telugu Desam Party
38	Women (General)	Manepalli Neelima	Telugu Desam Party
39	BC (Women)	Attivarapu Malleswari	Telugu Desam Party
40	SC	Abhishek	Telugu Desam Party
41	Women (General)	Palnati Aparna	Telugu Desam Party
42	Women (General)	Mandal Kamakshi	Bharatiya Janata Party
43	Women (General)	Mogarala Shobha	Bharatiya Janata Party
44	Women (General)	Bhimineni Veda Sri	Telugu Desam Party
45	Unreserved	Chittaluru Sundar Rami Reddy	Jana Sena Party
46	BC	Shaik Shamsuddin	Telugu Desam Party
47	SC	Thalluru Avinash	Telugu Desam Party
48	Women (General)	Shaik Habebunisa	Independent
49	BC	Madda Barna Bas	Telugu Desam Party
50	SC (Women)	Nandipati Sailaja	Telugu Desam Party
51	Women (General)	Bejavada Bhuvaneswari	Telugu Desam Party
52	Women (General)	Punnapu Vishnu Priya	Telugu Desam Party
53	Women (General)	Koppolu Navyalakshmi	Jana Sena Party
54	Women (General)	Annangi Samata	Telugu Desam Party
55	BC (Women)	Gandavaram Visalakshmi	Telugu Desam Party
56	BC (Women)	Nandimandalam Venkata Sri Divya	Telugu Desam Party
57	BC (Women)	Shaik Shabana Begum	Telugu Desam Party
58	BC	Shaik Karimulla	Telugu Desam Party
59	Unreserved	Darsi Harikrishna	Telugu Desam Party
60	Unreserved	Raghunadha Raju Kurapati	Bharatiya Janata Party
61	Unreserved	Anam Ranga Mayur Reddy	Telugu Desam Party
62	BC	Potluru Ramakrishna	Telugu Desam Party
63	BC	Mohammed Zubairuddin	Telugu Desam Party
64	BC (Women)	SK Najuma	Telugu Desam Party
65	BC	Dr Dharmavarapu Ganesh	Telugu Desam Party
66	BC (Women)	Kappira Revathi	Telugu Desam Party
67	SC (Women)	Nimmala Prasanna Kumari	Telugu Desam Party
68	SC (Women)	Meejuru Sirisha	Independent
69	BC	Shaik Shahina Begum	Telugu Desam Party
70	ST	Rachagiri Chandrasekhar	Telugu Desam Party
71	BC (Women)	Shaik Alia	Jana Sena Party
72	BC (Women)	Shaik Salma	Telugu Desam Party

== Nellore Municipal Corporation Elections ==
=== 2026 Nellore Municipal Corporation election ===
The fourth election was held following a delimitation exercise that expanded the corporation from 54 to 72 wards. Polling took place on 1 November 2026, and the results were declared on 3 November 2026.

Kutami majority
Alliance/Party		Flag	Symbol	Won	Change
Kutami	Telugu Desam Party			56	▲56
Kutami	Jana Sena Party			8	▲8
Kutami	Bharatiya Janata Party			5	▲5
Kutami	Kutami	—	—	69	▲69
YSR Congress Party		—		1	▼53
Independent		—	—	2	▲2
Total wards				72	Kutami Gain from YSRCP

=== 2021 Nellore Municipal Corporation election ===
The third election was held on 15 November 2021, following a delay caused by the COVID-19 pandemic. The results were declared on 17 November 2021.

YSRCP majority
Alliance/Party	Flag	Symbol	Won	Change
YSR Congress Party	—		54	▲22
Telugu Desam Party			0	▼17
Total wards			54	YSRCP Hold

=== 2014 Nellore Municipal Corporation election ===
The second election was held after years of delay for the delimitation exercise which added 4 more wards to the corporation. The election was held on 30 March 2014 for all 54 wards, with results declared on 12 May 2014.

YSRCP majority
Alliance/Party		Flag	Symbol	Won	Change
YSR Congress Party		—		32	▲32
TDP+	Telugu Desam Party			17	▼3
TDP+	Bharatiya Janata Party			2	Steady
TDP+	TDP+	—	—	19	▼3
Indian National Congress				1	▼18
Communist Party of India (Marxist)				1	▼3
Independent		—	—	1	▼4
Total wards				54	YSRCP Gain

=== 2005 Nellore Municipal Corporation election ===
The Nellore Municipal Corporation was established on 18 October 2004, when Nellore Municipality, originally constituted on 1 November 1866, was upgraded to municipal corporation status. The first Nellore Municipal Corporation election was held on 24 September 2005 to elect representatives to all 50 wards. It was the only municipal corporation in which the TDP emerged as the single largest party in 2005.

Hung corporation
Alliance/Party		Flag	Symbol	Won
INC+	Indian National Congress			19
INC+	Communist Party of India (Marxist)			4
INC+	INC+	—	—	23
Telugu Desam Party				20
Independent		—	—	5
Bharatiya Janata Party				2
Total wards			—	50

== Nellore Mayoral Elections ==
=== 2026 Nellore Mayor election ===
The 2026 election marked the first direct election of the mayor of Nellore Municipal Corporation, with voters electing the mayor through a separate first-past-the-post (FPTP) popular vote, rather than the mayor being elected indirectly by the corporation's elected members.

Voter turnout
Reservation	Eligible voters	Votes polled	Turnout
Unreserved	4,89,351	2,82,466	57.72%

Nellore mayoral election result
Winner		Votes	Vote share	Runner-up		Votes	Vote share	Margin	Margin (%)
TDP	Poluboina Roopkumar Yadav	1,70,440	60.34%	YSRCP	Anam Vijayakumar Reddy	89,719	31.76%	80,721	TDP +28.58

=== 2021 Nellore Mayor election ===
Potluri Sravanthi of the YSR Congress Party was elected Mayor of Nellore Municipal Corporation in 2022, following the party's victory in all 54 wards in the November 2021 municipal election.

=== 2014 Nellore Mayor election ===
Shaik Abdul Aziz of the YSR Congress Party became Mayor of Nellore Municipal Corporation in 2014, following the party's victory in the municipal corporation election. The Mayor was elected indirectly by the elected corporators.

=== 2005 Nellore Mayor election ===
Pulimi Sailaja Reddy of the Indian National Congress was unanimously elected as the first Mayor of Nellore Municipal Corporation on 30 September 2005, despite the elected-seat distribution resulting in a hung corporation. The mayoral election was conducted indirectly, with elected corporators and the corporation's four eligible ex-officio members, comprising three MLAs and one MP, participating in the election.

== Functions ==
Nellore Municipal Corporation is created for the following functions:

- Planning for the town including its surroundings which are covered under its Department's Urban Planning Authority .
- Approving construction of new buildings and authorising use of land for various purposes.
- Improvement of the town's economic and Social status.
- Arrangements of water supply towards commercial, residential and industrial purposes.
- Planning for fire contingencies through Fire Service Departments.
- Creation of solid waste management, public health system and sanitary services.
- Working for the development of ecological aspect like development of Urban Forestry and making guidelines for environmental protection.
- Working for the development of weaker sections of the society like mentally and physically handicapped, old age and gender biased people.
- Making efforts for improvement of slums and poverty removal in the town.

== Revenue sources ==
The following are the Income sources for the Corporation from the Central and State Government.

=== Revenue from taxes ===
Following is the Tax related revenue for the corporation.

- Property tax.
- Profession tax.
- Entertainment tax.
- Grants from Central and State Government like Goods and Services Tax.
- Advertisement tax.

=== Revenue from non-tax sources ===
Following is the Non Tax related revenue for the corporation.

- Water usage charges.
- Fees from Documentation services.
- Rent received from municipal property.
- Funds from municipal bonds.

== Achievements ==
- Improved its rankings in the Swachh Survekshan survey for cleanliness and sanitation.
- Implemented projects under the Atal Mission for Rejuvenation and Urban Transformation (AMRUT).
- Introduced solid waste management measures, including waste segregation at source and door-to-door collection.
- Established an Integrated Command and Control Centre (ICCC) for urban monitoring.
- Introduced urban infrastructure initiatives, including LED street lighting, digital grievance redressal portals and real-time water monitoring systems.
