= Adoni Assembly constituency =

Constituency of the Andhra Pradesh Legislative Assembly, India

Coordinates: 15.63°N 77.27°E

Adoni
- Constituency No. 146 for the Andhra Pradesh Legislative Assembly
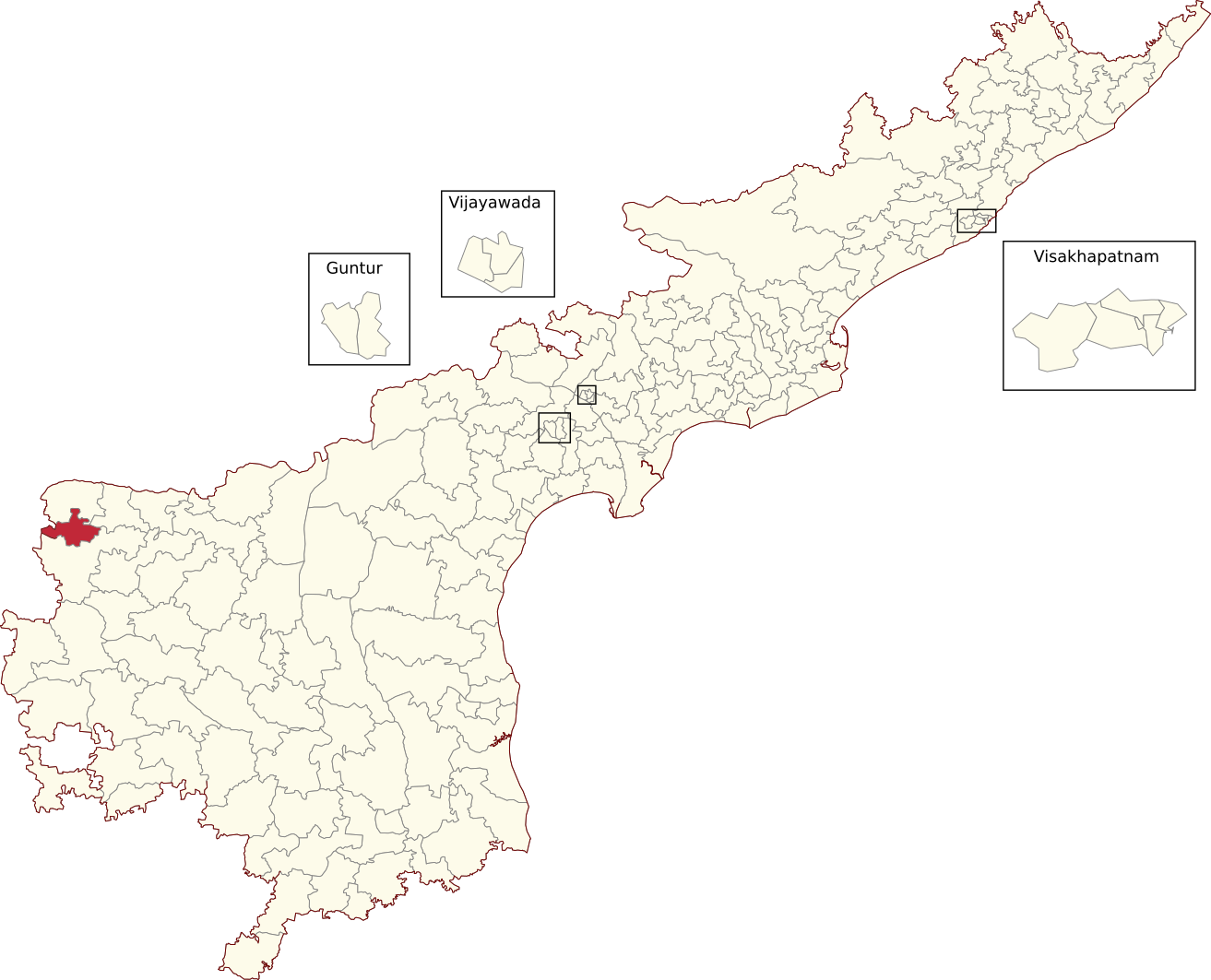
- Location of Adoni Assembly constituency within Andhra Pradesh

Constituency details
- Country: India
- Region: South India
- State: Andhra Pradesh
- District: Kurnool
- Lok Sabha constituency: Kurnool
- Established: 1951
- Reservation: None

Member of Legislative Assembly
- 16th Andhra Pradesh Legislative Assembly
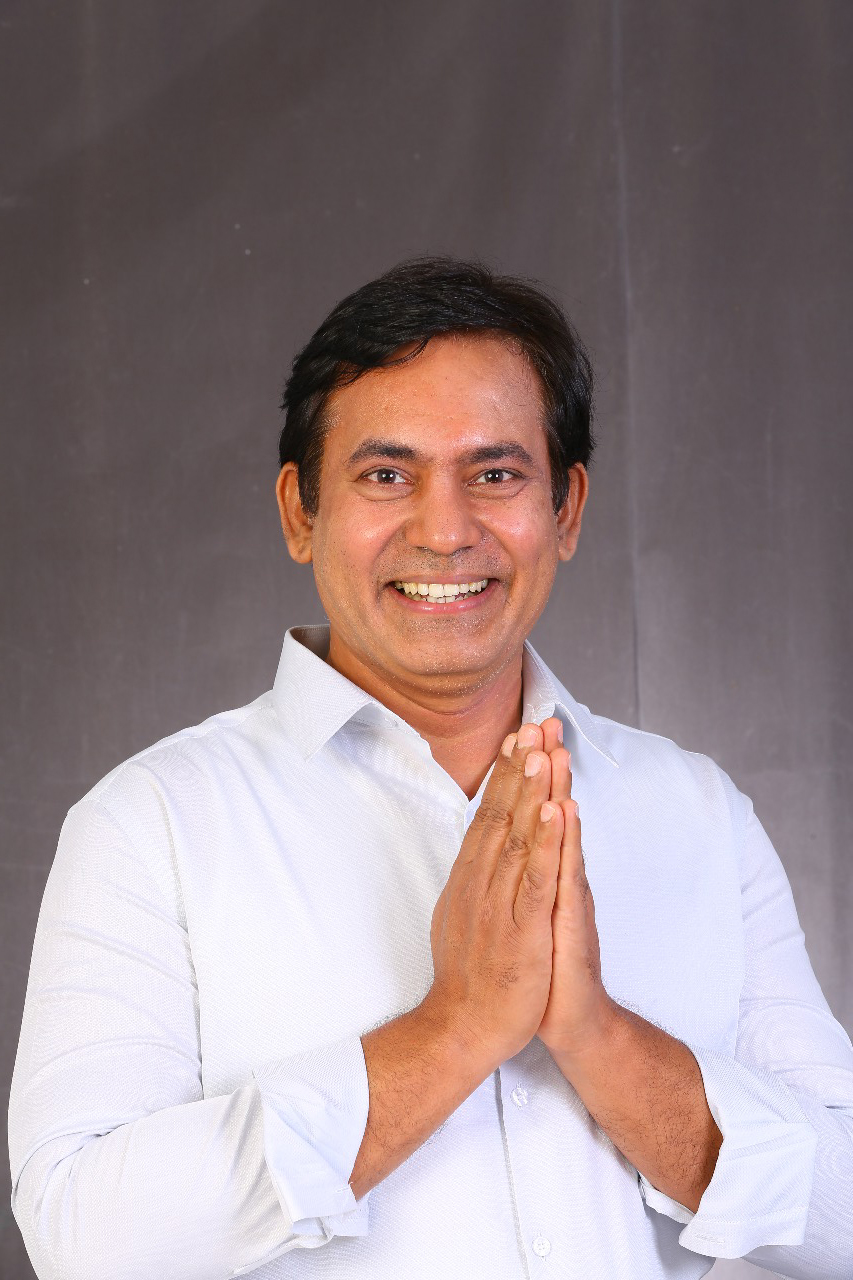
- Incumbent Podala Venkata Parthasarathi
- Party: BJP
- Alliance: NDA
- Elected year: 2024

Adoni Assembly constituency is a constituency in Kurnool district of Andhra Pradesh that elects representatives to the Andhra Pradesh Legislative Assembly in India. It is one of the seven assembly segments of Kurnool Lok Sabha constituency.

Podala Venkata Parthasarathi is the current MLA of the constituency, having won the 2024 Andhra Pradesh Legislative Assembly election from Bharatiya Janata Party. As of 25 March 2019, there are a total of 204,109 electors in the constituency. The constituency was established in 1951, as per the Delimitation Orders (1951).

== Mandals ==
1. Adoni Urban mandal
2. Adoni Rural mandal
Mandals in Adoni Assembly Constituency

== Members of the Legislative Assembly ==
Year	Member	Political party
1952	H. Ramalingareddy	Independent
1955	G. Bussanna	Praja Socialist Party
1962	H. Sitarama Reddy	Independent
1967	T. G. L. Thimmaiah	Indian National Congress
1972	H. Satyanarayana	Indian National Congress
1978	H. Satyanarayana	Indian National Congress
1983	N. Prakash Jain	Telugu Desam Party
1985	Raichoti Ramaiah	Indian National Congress
1989	Raichoti Ramaiah	Indian National Congress
1994	Konka Meenakshi Naidu	Telugu Desam Party
1999	Konka Meenakshi Naidu	Telugu Desam Party
2004	Y. Sai Prasad Reddy	Indian National Congress
2009	Konka Meenakshi Naidu	Telugu Desam Party
2014	Y. Sai Prasad Reddy	YSR Congress Party
2019	Y. Sai Prasad Reddy	YSR Congress Party
2024	P. V. Parthasarathi	Bharatiya Janata Party

== Election results ==
=== 1952 ===
1952 Madras Legislative Assembly election: Adoni
Party	Candidate	Votes	%	±%
Independent	H. Ramalinga Reddy	36,228	24.47	
INC	T. Mallayya	30,667	20.71	20.71
INC	T. G. Thimmayya Setty	26,513	17.91	17.91
Independent	Veerappa Reddy	11,516	7.78	
Independent	S. Thammanna	9,963	6.73	
CPI	K. Anjineyulu	8,291	5.60	
Socialist Party (India)	H. Satyanarayana Rao	6,832	4.61	
Socialist Party (India)	Kariappa	6,661	4.50	
Independent	Lachanna	6,579	4.44	
Independent	Nagappa	4,822	3.26	
Margin of victory		5,561	3.76	
Turnout		1,48,072	106.70	
Registered electors		1,38,769		
Independent win (new seat)				

=== 2004 ===
2004 Andhra Pradesh Legislative Assembly election: Adoni
Party	Candidate	Votes	%	±%
INC	Y. Sai Prasad Reddy	66,242	57.33	+17.07
TDP	G.Krishnamma	41,501	35.92	−18.14
Majority		24,741	21.41	
Turnout		115,548	58.91	−1.49
INC gain from TDP		Swing		

=== 2009 ===
2009 Andhra Pradesh Legislative Assembly election: Adoni
Party	Candidate	Votes	%	±%
TDP	Konka Meenakshi Naidu	45,294	38.84	+2.92
INC	Y. Sai Prasad Reddy	45,038	38.62	−17.71
PRP	B.Khaja Saleem	17,917	15.37	
Majority		256	0.22	
Turnout		116,604	67.85	−1.06
TDP gain from INC		Swing		

=== 2014 ===
2014 Andhra Pradesh Legislative Assembly election: Adoni
Party	Candidate	Votes	%	±%
YSRCP	Y. Sai Prasad Reddy	72,121	51.97	
TDP	Konka Meenakshi Naidu	55,290	39.84	
Majority		16,831	12.13	
Turnout		138,764	65.68	+7.83
YSRCP gain from TDP		Swing		

=== 2019 ===
2019 Andhra Pradesh Legislative Assembly election: Adoni
Party	Candidate	Votes	%	±%
YSRCP	Y. Sai Prasad Reddy	74,109	49.97	
TDP	Konka Meenakshi Naidu	61,790	42.84	
Majority		12,319	10.13	
Turnout		148,764	65.68	+7.83
YSRCP gain from TDP		Swing		

=== 2024 ===
2024 Andhra Pradesh Legislative Assembly election: Adoni
Party	Candidate	Votes	%	±%
BJP	Podala Venkata Parthasarathi	89,929	51.06	
YSRCP	Y. Sai Prasad Reddy	71,765	40.74	
INC	Golla Ramesh	7,622	4.33	
NOTA	None of the above	1,615	0.92	
Majority		18,164	10.32	
Turnout		1,76,133		
BJP gain from YSRCP		Swing		

== See also ==
- List of constituencies of Andhra Pradesh Legislative Assembly
