= List of governors of Sikkim =

Govornor of Sikkim

Governor of Sikkim
- Emblem of Sikkim

- Flag of India

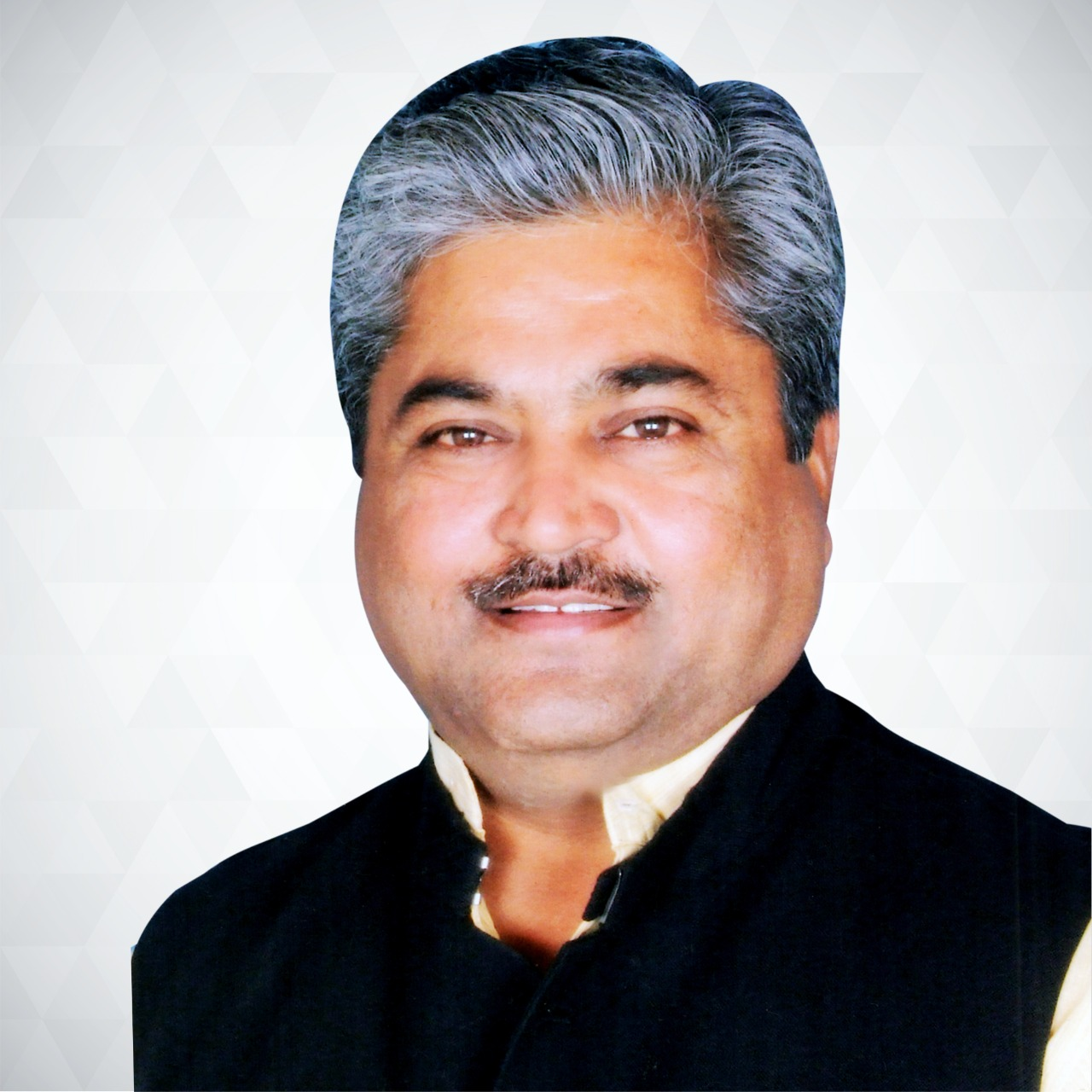
- Incumbent; Dushyant Kumar Gautam since 19 October 2026
- Style: His Excellency
- Residence: Lok Bhavan, Gangtok
- Appointer: President of India
- Term length: At the pleasure of the president
- Inaugural holder: B. B. Lal
- Formation: 18 May 1975; 51 years ago
- Website: rajbhavansikkim.gov.in

The state of Sikkim is in northeast India.

The governor of Sikkim is the head of the Indian state of Sikkim. The governor is appointed by the president of India and is the nominal head of the state's executive power. This is a list of the governors of Sikkim. There are 19 governors if governors with additional charge also counted.

== Powers and functions ==
The governor enjoys many different types of powers:

- Executive powers related to administration, appointments and removals.
- Legislative powers related to lawmaking and the state legislature, that is Vidhan Sabha or Vidhan Parishad.
- Discretionary powers to be carried out according to the discretion of the governor.

== List ==
Legend

- ^{†} Died in office
- ^{§} Transferred
- ^{‡} Resigned/removed

Color key

- indicates acting/additional charge

#	Portrait	Name (born – died)	Home state	Tenure in office			Appointer (President)
#	Portrait	Name (born – died)	Home state	From	To	Time in office	Appointer (President)
1		B. B. Lal; ICS (Retd) (1917–2008)	Uttar Pradesh	16 May 1975	9 January 1981	5 years, 238 days	Fakhruddin Ali Ahmed
2		Homi J. H. Taleyarkhan (1912–1998)	Maharashtra	10 January 1981	17 June 1984	3 years, 159 days	Neelam Sanjiva Reddy
3		Kona Prabhakara Rao (1916–1990)	Andhra Pradesh	18 June 1984	30 May 1985^{[§]} (Note: Transferred as the Governor of Maharashtra)	346 days	Zail Singh
4		Bhishma Narain Singh (1933–2018) (Additional charge)	Bihar	31 May 1985	20 November 1985	173 days	Zail Singh
5		T. V. Rajeswar; IPS (Retd) (1926–2018)	Tamil Nadu	21 November 1985	1 March 1989^{[§]} (Note: Transferred as the Governor of West Bengal)	3 years, 100 days	Zail Singh
6		S. K. Bhatnagar; IAS (Retd) (1930–2001)	–	2 March 1989	7 February 1990^{[‡]}	342 days	Ramaswamy Venkataraman
7		Admiral; Radhakrishna Hariram Tahiliani (Retd); PVSM AVSM (1930–2015)	Maharashtra	8 February 1990	20 September 1994	4 years, 224 days	Ramaswamy Venkataraman
8		P. Shiv Shankar (1929–2017)	Andhra Pradesh	21 September 1994	11 November 1995^{[§]} (Note: Transferred as the Governor of Kerala)	1 year, 51 days	Shankar Dayal Sharma
9		K. V. Raghunatha Reddy (1924–2002) (Additional charge)	Andhra Pradesh	12 November 1995	9 February 1996	89 days	Shankar Dayal Sharma
10		Chaudhary Randhir Singh (1924–2023)	Haryana	10 February 1996	17 May 2001	5 years, 96 days	Shankar Dayal Sharma
11		Kidar Nath Sahani (1926–2012)	Delhi	18 May 2001	25 October 2002^{[§]} (Note: Transferred as the Governor of Goa)	1 year, 160 days	K. R. Narayanan
12		V. Rama Rao (1935–2016)	Andhra Pradesh	26 October 2002	12 July 2006	3 years, 259 days	A. P. J. Abdul Kalam
13		R. S. Gavai (1929–2015) (Acting)	Maharashtra	13 July 2006	12 August 2006	30 days	A. P. J. Abdul Kalam
14		V. Rama Rao (1935–2016)	Andhra Pradesh	13 August 2006	25 October 2007	1 year, 73 days	A. P. J. Abdul Kalam
15		Sudarshan Agarwal (1931–2019)	Punjab	25 October 2007	8 July 2008	257 days	Pratibha Patil
16		Balmiki Prasad Singh (born 1942)	Bihar	9 July 2008	9 July 2013	5 years, 0 days	Pratibha Patil
17		Shriniwas Dadasaheb Patil; IAS (Retd) (born 1941)	Maharashtra	20 July 2013	26 August 2018	5 years, 37 days	Pranab Mukherjee
18		Ganga Prasad Chaurasia (born 1939)	Bihar	26 August 2018	16 February 2023	4 years, 174 days	Ram Nath Kovind
19		Lakshman Prasad Acharya (born 1954)	Uttar Pradesh	16 February 2023	31 July 2024^{[§]} (Note: Transferred as the Governor of Assam)	1 year, 165 days	Droupadi Murmu
20		Om Prakash Mathur (born 1952)	Rajasthan	31 July 2024	19 October 2026^{[§]}	2 years, 80 days	Droupadi Murmu
21		Dushyant Kumar Gautam (born 1957)	Delhi	19 October 2026	Incumbent	3 days	Droupadi Murmu

== Oath ==
"Ma, [Governor's Name], Ishwar-ko naam-ma shapath linchhu ki ma nishtha-purvak Sikkim-ko Rajyapal-ko pad-ko karyabhaar samhaalnechhu (athava Rajyapal-ka karyaharu-ko nirvahan garnechhu) ra aaphno purai kshamata-le Sambhidhan ra kaanoon-ko samrakshan, suraksha ra pratiraksha garnechhu ani ma aaphulaai Sikkim-ka janta-ko seva ra kalyan-ma samarpit garnechhu.

== See also ==
- Sikkim
- Chief Minister of Sikkim
- Governors of India
