= List of current city mayors in Andhra Pradesh =

In Andhra Pradesh, Mayor is the head of city corporations in 17 cities. All the duties in the city at Corporation level are carried in his name. He is also first citizen of the city. However in Andhra Pradesh, the Mayor is the ceremonial head as he was elected among the corporators and executive authority rests with the municipal commissioner. Following elections to any municipal corporation, there will be an election to the mayor and after that election to the post of deputy mayor is also being conducted. the governor usually invites the party (or coalition) with a majority of seats to form the state government. The governor appoints the chief minister, whose council of ministers are collectively responsible to the assembly. Given they have the municipal corporation's confidence, the mayor's term is usually for a maximum of five years; there are no limits to the number of terms they can serve.

== Current office-holders ==
City (Corporation)	District	Name	Party	Ref.
Visakhapatnam (Greater Visakhapatnam Municipal Corporation)	Visakhapatnam; Anakapalli	Vacant		
Vijayawada (Vijayawada Municipal Corporation)	NTR	Vacant		
Guntur (Guntur Municipal Corporation)	Guntur	Vacant		
Mangalagiri – Tadepalli (Mangalagiri Tadepalli Municipal Corporation)	Guntur	Vacant		
Kurnool (Kurnool Municipal Corporation)	Kurnool	Vacant		
Nellore (Nellore Municipal Corporation)	Nellore	Vacant		
Rajamahendravaram (Rajamahendravaram Municipal Corporation)	East Godavari	Vacant		
Kadapa (Kadapa Municipal Corporation)	Kadapa	Vacant		
Kakinada (Kakinada Municipal Corporation)	Kakinada	Vacant		
Tirupati (Tirupati Municipal Corporation)	Tirupati	Vacant		
Eluru (Eluru Municipal Corporation)	Eluru	Vacant		
Anantapuramu (Anantapuramu Municipal Corporation)	Anantapuramu	Vacant		
Vizianagaram (Vizianagaram Municipal Corporation)	Vizianagaram	Vacant		
Ongole (Ongole Municipal Corporation)	Prakasham	Vacant		
Machilipatnam (Machilipatnam Municipal Corporation)	Krishna	Vacant		
Chittoor (Chittoor Municipal Corporation)	Chittoor	Vacant		
Srikakulam (Srikakulam Municipal Corporation)	Srikakulam	Vacant		
