= Homi J. H. Taleyarkhan =

Indian politician

Homi J.H. Taleyarkhan

Governor of Sikkim
- In office 10 January 1981 – 17 June 1984
- Appointed by: Neelam Sanjiva Reddy
- Prime Minister: Indira Gandhi
- Chief Minister: Nar Bahadur Bhandari
- Preceded by: B. B. Lal
- Succeeded by: Kona Prabhakara Rao

Ambassador of India to Italy and Libya
- In office August 1984 – November 1985
- Appointed by: Zail Singh

Member, National Commission for Minorities
- In office 16 November 1985 – 15 November 1990
- Chairman: Mirza Hameedullah Beg; S. M. H. Burney
Maharashtra state offices
Minister of Tourism
In office 1 May 1960 – 24 November 1963
Chief Minister	Yashwantrao Chavan; Marotrao Kannamwar
Succeeded by	P. K. Sawant
In office 5 December 1963 – 1 March 1967
Chief Minister	Vasantrao Naik
Preceded by	P. K. Sawant
Succeeded by	Balasaheb Desai
Minister of Public Health
In office 1 May 1960 – 7 March 1962
Chief Minister	Yashwantrao Chavan
Succeeded by	P. K. Sawant
Minister of Ports Development
In office 8 March 1962 – 19 November 1962
Chief Minister	Yashwantrao Chavan
Preceded by	Vasantrao Naik
Succeeded by	M. G. Mane
Minister of Housing and Food, Civil Supplies and Consumer Protection
In office 8 March 1962 – 24 November 1963
Chief Minister	Yashwantrao Chavan; Marotrao Kannamwar
Preceded by	Sultan G. Kazi
Succeeded by	P. K. Sawant
In office 5 December 1963 – 1 March 1967
Chief Minister	Vasantrao Naik
Preceded by	P. K. Sawant
Succeeded by	D. S. Palaspagar
Minister of Fisheries
In office 20 November 1962 – 24 November 1963
Chief Minister	Marotrao Kannamwar
Preceded by	Balasaheb Desai
Succeeded by	P. K. Sawant
In office 5 December 1963 – 1 March 1967
Chief Minister	Vasantrao Naik
Preceded by	P. K. Sawant
Succeeded by	P. K. Sawant
Minister of School Education
In office 1 March 1967 – 27 October 1969
Chief Minister	Vasantrao Naik
Preceded by	Madhukar Dhanaji Chaudhari
Succeeded by	Nirmala Raje Bhosale
Minister of Sports and Youth Welfare
In office 27 October 1969 – 13 March 1972
Chief Minister	Vasantrao Naik
Preceded by	Vasantrao Naik
Succeeded by	Rafiq Zakaria

Personal details
- Born: 1912
- Died: 27 June 1998
- Party: Indian National Congress
- Awards: Padma Shri (1992)

Homi J.H. Taleyarkhan (1912 – 27 June 1998) was an Indian Gandhian, Congress politician and a former Governor of Sikkim.

Before his gubernatorial posting, Taleyarkhan had served as a Minister of Housing and Civil Supplies of the Government of Maharashtra and as India's Ambassador to Libya.

Taleyarkhan served as the second Governor of Sikkim from 9 January 1981 to 17 June 1984. As governor, he persuaded the then Chief Minister Nar Bahadur Bhandari to merge his Sikkim Janata Parishad with the Indian National Congress but their relationship later soured.

A member of the Parsi community, he served as a member of the National Minorities Commission of India after his gubernatorial assignment from 1985–1990. He was awarded the Padma Shri in 1992. He was a prolific writer, especially on Gandhi and Gandhism. Some of his books include From Warfare to Welfare: The Ideal of National Integration and the Splendor of Sikkim.

Homi J.H. Taleyarkhan: a man of devotion, dedication, and commitment is his biography by Sheshrao Chavan. He was married to Thrity Homi Taleyarkhan, a social activist and a former president of the Maharashtra State Women’s Council. The Homi J. H. Taleyarkhan Memorial Hospital and the Homi J. H. Taleyarkhan Memorial Hall in Mumbai have been named in his honour.

== Books ==
- Cricket: United india in Australia, Thacker, 1947
- In the Land of the Blue Hills : A Visitor's Book to Ooty, 1951
- Roads to Beauty around Bombay, Published by Popular Book Depot, Bombay, 1953
- Aspects of Buddhism, Published by Vision Books, India, 1957
- Khandala, Lonavla and Environments, Published by Lonavla Borough Municipality, Lonavla, 1958
- Splendour of Sikkim, 1982
- From Warfare to Welfare : The Ideal of National Integration, Bhartiya Vidya Bhavan, 1993
- Escape from the City
- Resort of Tomorrow
- Japan Today
- Cheers and Tears of Village Life
- Hill Stations of Western and South India
