= Y. Sai Prasad Reddy =

Indian politician

Yellareddygari Sai Prasad Reddy (born 1 July 1966) is an Indian politician from Andhra Pradesh. He is a member of the Andhra Pradesh Legislative Assembly from Adoni Assembly constituency in Kurnool district. He was elected in the 2019 Andhra Pradesh Legislative Assembly election representing the YSR Congress Party.

== Early life and education ==
Reddy hails from Adoni, Kurnool district, Andhra Pradesh. His father Bheema Reddy was a farmer. He completed his schooling from Zilla Parishad High School, Konakandla village, Vajrakarur mandal, Anantapur district. Later, he did his pre-university course. He comes from an agricultural family but runs his own business.

== Career ==
Reddy was elected in the 2019 Andhra Pradesh Legislative Assembly election representing the YSR Congress Party in the Adoni Assembly constituency. He polled 74,109 votes and defeated his nearest rival, Konka Meenakshi Naidu of the Telugu Desam Party, by a margin of 12,319 votes. He was first elected as an MLA from Adoni representing the Indian National Congress in the 2004 Andhra Pradesh Legislative Assembly election. In 2004, he polled 66,242 votes and defeated G. Krishnamma of the Telugu Desam by a margin of 24,741 votes. He lost the next election in 2008 to Konka Meenakshi Naidu of the Telugu Desam but regained the seat winning the 2014 Andhra Pradesh Legislative Assembly election. In 2014, he polled 72,121 votes and defeated Meenakshi Naidu of the TDP by a margin of 16,831 votes. He was elected for a third time in the 2019. However, he lost the 2024 Assembly election to P. V. Parthasarathi of the Bharatiya Janata Party.
