= Kidar Nath Sahani =

Indian politician (1926-2012)

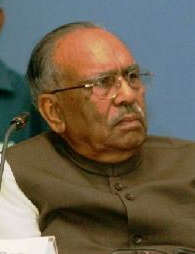

Governor of Goa
- In office 26 October 2002 – 2 July 2004
- Preceded by: Mohammed Fazal
- Succeeded by: Mohammed Fazal

Governor of Sikkim
- In office 18 May 2001 – 25 October 2002
- Preceded by: Chaudhary Randhir Singh
- Succeeded by: V. Rama Rao

Chief Executive Councillor of Delhi Metropolitan Council
- In office 1977–1980
- Preceded by: Radha Raman
- Succeeded by: Jag Parvesh Chandra

Personal details
- Born: 24 October 1926 Rawalpindi, Punjab, British India
- Died: 3 October 2012 (aged 85) Delhi, India

Kidar Nath Sahani (24 October 1926 – 3 October 2012) was a governor of the Indian states of Sikkim (2001–02) and Goa (2002–04). He was a pracharak of the Rashtriya Swayamsevak Sangh (RSS) and a leader of the Bharatiya Jana Sangh and Bharatiya Janata Party.

== Early life and education ==
He lived in Delhi, though he was born in Rawalpindi, British India, having migrated here following the Partition. He worked for the rights and rehabilitation of the refugees and a leading political figure in Delhi of the right wing Jana Sangh party.

== Career ==
Sahani had served as Mayor of Delhi and Chief Executive of the Delhi Metropolitan Council. He was a swayamsewak of the Rashtriya Swayamsevak Sangh and played a key role in the growth of the Sangh and the Bharatiya Janata Party in Delhi. During Emergency, Sahani went underground and later escaped abroad from where he worked against the Indira Gandhi government. Post Emergency, he became a leading figure in Delhi municipal politics, going on to become Deputy Mayor, Mayor and Chairman of the Standing Committee of the Municipal Corporation of Delhi. He also served as the President of the Delhi State Unit of the Bharatiya Janata Party.

Kidar Nath Sahani served as Governor to the states of Sikkim and Goa during the NDA regime but was dismissed from office in 2004 after the UPA government was formed on charges of misuse of office and because of his RSS background.

== Death ==
He died at the age of 85 at Delhi.
