= B. B. Lal (governor) =

Indian politician

1st Governor of Sikkim
- In office 16 May 1975 – 9 January 1981
- Chief Minister: Kazi Lhendup Dorjee; Nar Bahadur Bhandari
- Preceded by: Post Started
- Succeeded by: Homi J. H. Taleyarkhan

Personal details
- Born: Bipen Behari Lal; 30 January 1917 British India
- Died: 5 January 2008 (aged 90) New Delhi, India
- Occupation: Politician

Bipen Behari Lal (30 January 1917 – 5 January 2008) was an Indian civil servant who served as the first governor of the state of Sikkim after its merger with India. Prior to the merger, he served as the Chief Executive of the Kingdom of Sikkim.

== Career ==
Lal joined the Indian Civil Service in 1941 and was given various responsibilities in the Government of Uttar Pradesh until 1965. In 1966, he was moved to the Central Government where he served in various capacities.

In 1974, Lal was the Government of India-appointed Chief Executive in the Kingdom of Sikkim. Soon after the Annexation of Sikkim by India in May 1975, he was made the first governor of the new state of Sikkim. He served in this capacity till early 1981.

== Death ==
He died in New Delhi, on 5 January 2008.

== See also ==
- Palden Thondup Namgyal

Political offices
Preceded by	Chief Executive of the Kingdom of Sikkim; 19 September 1974 - 15 May 1975	Merger of Sikkim with India
New title	Governor of Sikkim; 16 May 1975 - 9 January 1981	Succeeded by Homi J. H. Taleyarkhan
