= Lok Bhavan, Gangtok =

Residence of the Governor of Sikkim

- Interactive map of the Lok Bhavan, Gangtok area

General information
- Coordinates: 27.3411°N 88.6155°E
- Current tenants: Om Parkash Mathur
- Owner: Government of Sikkim

References
- Website

Lok Bhavan formerly Raj Bhavan (translation: Government House) is the official residence of the governor of Sikkim. It is located in the capital city of Gangtok, Sikkim.

== Background ==
After the Sikkim Expedition drove Tibetan forces out of Sikkim in 1888, the British sent John Claude White as Assistant Political Officer with the expeditionary force. In 1889, he was offered the post of Political Officer of Sikkim. Although White was a Civil Engineer employed by the Public Works Department, he was so enamoured with Sikkim that he accepted the post of Political Officer unhesitatingly.

White built what is today the Raj Bhavan at Gangtok. He gives a vivid account of how he personally selected the site, why it appealed to him and his travails in building it in his memoirs first published in 1909.

:"One of the first things to be done on my appointment to Sikkim was to build a house, not an easy task in a wild country where masons and carpenters were conspicuous by their absence, where stone for building had to be quarried from the hillsides and trees cut down for timber. In my jungle wanderings around Gangtok, I came across a charming site in the midst of primeval forest which seemed suitable in every way, so I determined to build on it, felling only the trees which might possible endanger the safety of the house, a necessary precaution, as many of them were quite 140 feet high, and in the spring the thunderstorms, accompanied by violent winds, were something terrible and wrought havoc everywhere. By leveling the uneven ground and throwing it out in front, I managed to get sufficient space for the house, with lawn and flower beds around it. Behind rose a high mountain, thickly wooded, which protected us from the storms sweeping down from the snows to the north-east, and in front the ground fell away with a magnificent view across the valley, where, from behind the opposite hills, Kanchenjunga and its surroundings snows towered up against the clear sky, making one of the most beautiful and magnificent sights to be imagined, and one certainly not to be surpassed, if equaled, anywhere in the world."

White retired in October 1908. The Residency he built was a lasting legacy he left behind. After White, all the incumbents of the post of Political Officer Sikkim, Bhutan and Tibet based in Gangtok enjoyed the comforts of the English villa-like Residency he had built. They were: Sir Charles Bell, Major W.L. Campbell, Lt. Colonel W.F. O’Conner, Major F.M. Bailey, Major J.L.R. Weir, Frederick Williamson, Sir Basil Gould and Anthony J. Hopkinson.(three officers – David McDonald, Capt. R.K.M. Battye and H. Richardson – also temporarily held the post).

Sir A.J. Hopkinson was the last British Political Officer of Sikkim. When India gained independence from British rule in 1947, the Residency became the residence of the Indian Political Officer, locally referred to as the Burra Kothi. A span of 86 years between 1889 and 1975 (Claude White to Gurbachan Singh) lay between the first Political Officer's appointment and the withdrawal of the last.

== Residency and local people ==
White's completed Residency was a revelation, an object of much curiosity for the Sikkimese hitherto not exposed to such a house. They would often call on the Whites and request permission to wander around the house; to see how the Whites lived and what European furniture was like. The Residency had bay windows and a round dining table. This really fired the imagination of the local Sikkimese Kazis who also incorporated bay windows and copied the round table for their own residences.

== From residency to Raj Bhavan ==
In 1975, the institution of the Chogyal, the hereditary leader of Sikkim, was abolished and the state was formally inducted into the Indian Union as her 22nd State. For having made this culmination possible, Shri B.B. Lal was made Governor of Sikkim on 18 May 1975 the same day that the amendment Bill received the President's assent. This marked the conversion of the Residency into a Raj Bhavan. In its previous designation as India House or Baara Khoti, it had been rated as one India's best Ambassadorial residences-it would now qualify as India's most attractive Raj Bhavan. Sited well above the town and insulated from the noise and fumes of the bazaar, the classic gabled structure lends into the greenery and trees of the landscape and looks on the entire Kanchendzonga range. The area of the compound is approximately 75 acres (30 ha) consisting of lawn and garden as well as kitchen garden and fruit orchards. Several incumbents since then (Sarva Shri H.J.H. Taleyar Khan, K. Prabhakar Rao, B.N. Singh, T.V. Rajeshwar, S.K. Bhatnagar, R.H. Thailiani, P. Shiv Shankar, K.V. Ragunath Reddy, Chaudhary Randhir Singh, Kidar Nath Sahani, R.S. Gavai, V. Rama Rao, Sudarshan Agarwal) have held the post of Governor of Sikkim and resided at the Raj Bhavan. White's Residency has stood a silent spectator for over a hundred years as the winds of change blew over Sikkim's political landscape.

== See also ==
- Government Houses of the British Indian Empire
