= Hyderabad District =

Hyderabad District may refer to:

- Hyderabad district, India
- Hyderabad District, Pakistan
