= Gemmological Institute of India =

Gemology training school in Mumbai, India

Gemmological Institute of India is a gemmology training school in Mumbai, India.

== Description ==
The Gemological Institute of India (GII) is a non-profit school in Mumbai that conducts courses on gemmology. It was founded in April 1971 by the Gem and Jewellery Exporters' Association, Bombay. It offers diplomas for gemmology and diamond grading, and courses on jewellery design, pearls and bead stringing, diamond casting, and craftsman training. The school courses enable students to take the certification of Fellow of Gemmological Association (FGA) examination of the United Kingdom.

It publishes a quarterly publication called Indian Gemmologist. The GII is recognized by CIBJO which is an international confederation of jewellery trading industry that harmonizes standards set by gem testing laboratories.

== History ==
The GII established India's first Gem Testing Laboratory in 1971, and started India's first Gemmology course in 1974. It started its Research and Development Laboratory in the field of gem stones in 1976, and its first Diamond Assorting and Grading Course in 1978. It started the first correspondence course in Gemmology in India in 1983, Jewellery Casting and Jewellery Designing courses in 1995.

The Gem Testing Laboratory was recognized by the International apex organization of Gem and Jewellery Trade, CIBJO. With increasing consumer awareness, the jewellery industry worldwide began to issue certifications to attest the quality of gem and diamond products. The GII started diamond certification in India in 2000. .

In November 2004, during the 25th convocation, it was announced that the Gem and Jewellery Export Promotion Council (GJEPC), Diamond Exporters' Association Ltd, Bharat Diamond Bourse and Gem and Jewellery Exporters' Association together with the Gemmological Institute of India will provide funds to set up a research centre in Mumbai, to carry out research and development activities especially for synthetic diamond and high pressure high temperature (HPHT) treated diamonds. The board was expanded to include eleven trustees, six from GJEPC, three from Gem and Jewellery Exporters' Association, one from Bharat Diamond Bourse and one from Diamond Exporters' Association Ltd.

In 2005, it was estimated that 5000 people have been trained in gemmology by GII since its inception. In October 2005, The GII acquired 4,500 square feet (420 m^{2}) of premises at Sukh Sagar Building at the Opera House to expand its diamond grading laboratory Services. The new facility is called the National Research Centre. In 2005, the department of scientific and industrial research of the central government of India, recognized the R&D Laboratory as a Scientific and Industrial Research Organization (SIRO).

In 2006, the GII tied up with Panjab University, Chandigarh as a research center for Ph.D. Studies in the field of gemstones and diamonds.

== Research ==
An issue the world's jewellery traders face is that synthetic diamonds, which are cheaper and now very widespread, can be used to defraud consumers of natural diamonds. As synthetic diamond technology becomes more easily accessible it is necessary for consumers, customs, importers, exporters, and government to be sure of the grade and quality of the diamond or gemstone. Synthetic diamonds may be produced by high-pressure, high-temperature (HTPT) method or chemical vapor deposition (CVD) method, which leave their signatures in the composition of the diamond. Research includes investigating techniques to look for these differences and distinguish natural gem stones from artificially produced ones.
