= Kutami =

Indian political alliance in the state of Andhra Pradesh

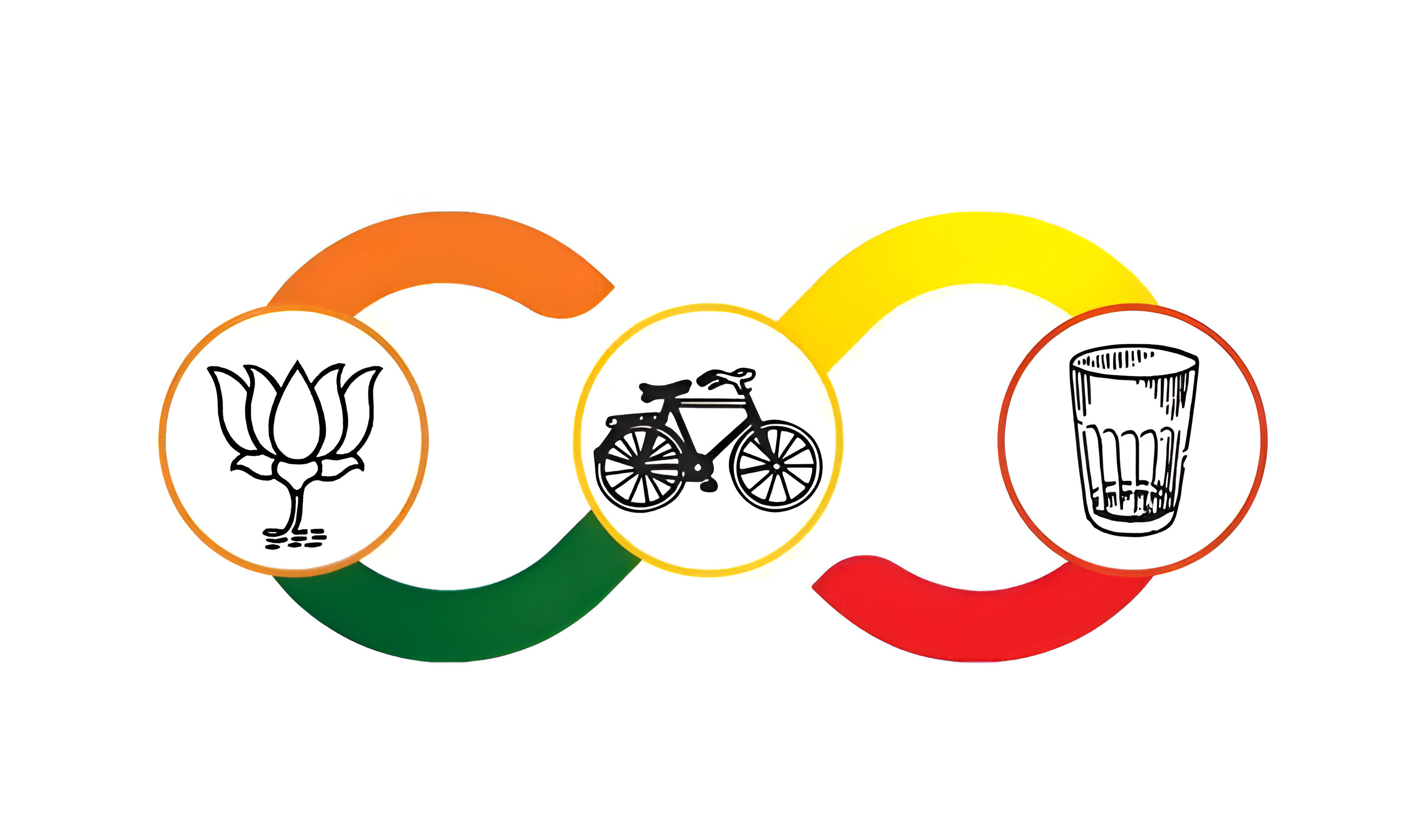
- Leader: N. Chandrababu Naidu (Chief Minister)
- Founders: N. Chandrababu Naidu; Pawan Kalyan; Narendra Modi
- Founded: 9 March 2024
- Ideology: Majority: Telugu nationalism Regionalism; Conservatism; Secularism; Neoliberalism; Populism; Factions: Hindutva; Hindu nationalism
- Political position: Centre to centre-right
- National affiliation: National Democratic Alliance
- Colours: Yellow
- Rajya Sabha: 7 / 11
- Lok Sabha: 21 / 25
- Andhra Pradesh Legislative Council: 15 / 58
- Andhra Pradesh Legislative Assembly: 164 / 175
- Municipal Corporations: 12 / 17
- Municipalities: 74 / 88
- Nagar Panchayats: 8 / 18

The Kutami (Kūṭami; Telugu: కూటమి, lit. 'Alliance') is a political alliance in the Indian state of Andhra Pradesh, officially established in 2024 as part of the National Democratic Alliance (NDA). The coalition comprises the Telugu Desam Party (TDP), Janasena Party (JSP), and Bharatiya Janata Party (BJP). Although the coalition was formally named "Kūṭami" in 2024, the three parties had previously collaborated during the 2014 Andhra Pradesh Legislative Assembly election, where the TDP and BJP contested together while the JSP did not participate but extended support.

The formation of Kūṭami began on 14 September 2023, when the TDP and JSP announced their alliance, with the TDP subsequently re-joining the NDA on 9 March 2024. Earlier, the JSP re-joined NDA on 16 January 2020. The name "Kūṭami" gained prominence during this period, signifying the renewed collaboration of these parties. The coalition achieved significant electoral success in 2024, winning 164 out of 175 seats in the 2024 Andhra Pradesh Legislative Assembly election and 21 out of 25 Lok Sabha seats in the state during the 2024 Indian general election in Andhra Pradesh.

== Current alliance members ==
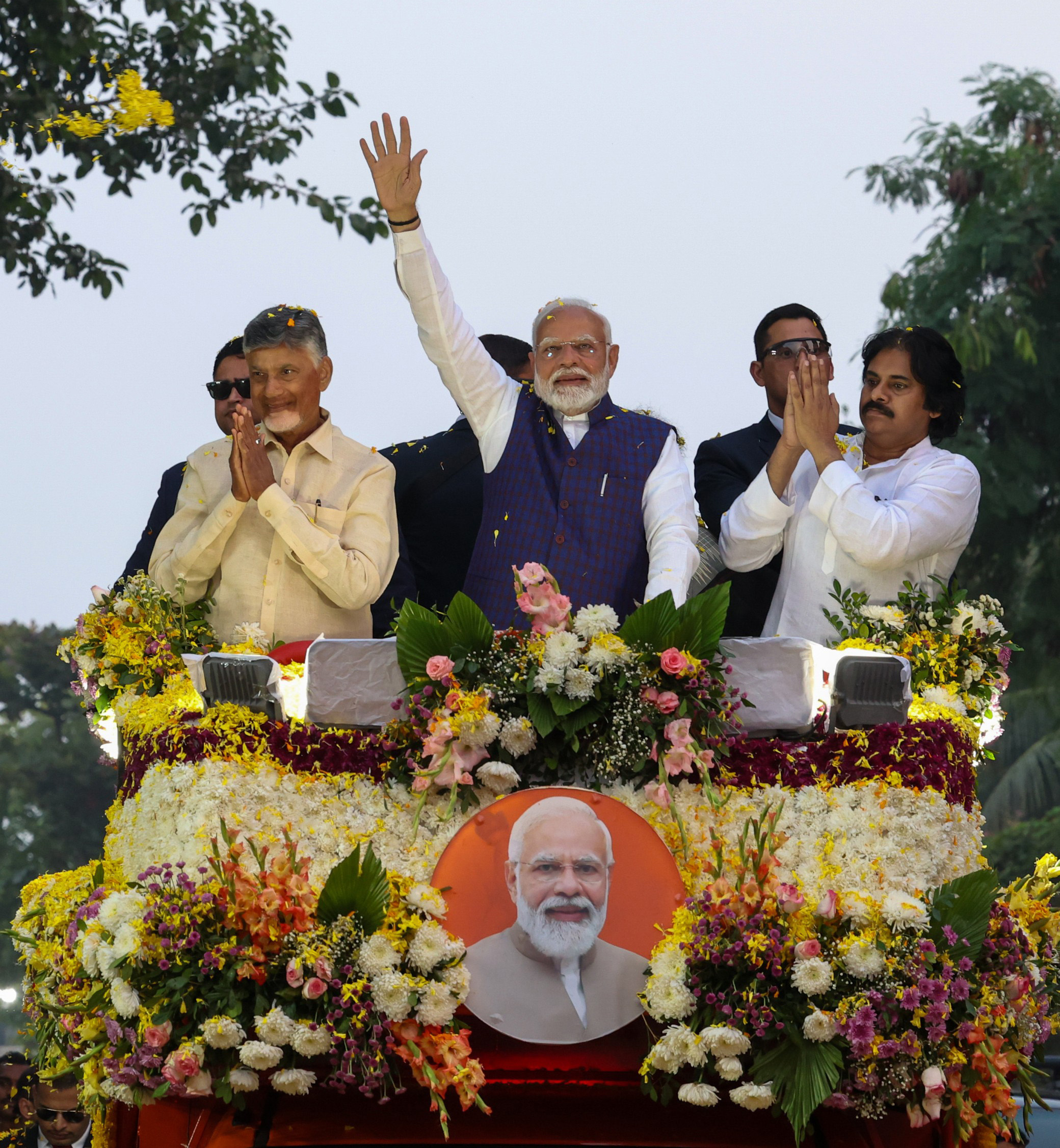
N. Chandrababu Naidu (left) and Pawan Kalyan (right) along with Prime Minister Narendra Modi (centre) participating in a roadshow in Visakhapatnam of Andhra Pradesh in 2025.

Party	Symbol	Flag	MLAs in Andhra Pradesh Assembly	MLCs in Andhra Pradesh Council	MPs in Lok Sabha	MPs in Rajya Sabha
Telugu Desam Party			135 / 175	10 / 58	16 / 25	4 / 11
Janasena Party			21 / 175	2 / 58	2 / 25	1 / 11
Bharatiya Janata Party			8 / 175	2 / 58	3 / 25	2 / 11
Total			164 / 175	14 / 58	21 / 25	7 / 11

== Electoral performance ==
=== 2024 Indian general election ===
Year	Seats won/ Seats contested	Change in seats	(%) of votes	Vote swing	Popular vote
2024	21 / 25	▲18	53.37	▲6.33	17,774,004

Party-wise results
Party	Popular vote			Seats		
Party	Votes	%	±pp	Contested	Won	+/−
Telugu Desam Party	12,569,179	37.79	▼2.40	17	16	▲13
Bharatiya Janata Party	3,750,687	11.28	▲10.30	6	3	▲3
Janasena Party	1,454,138	4.30	▼1.57	2	2	▲2
Total	17,774,004	53.37	6.33	25	21	18

=== 2024 Andhra Pradesh Legislative Assembly election ===
Year	Seats won/ Seats contested	Change in seats	(%) of votes	Vote swing	Popular vote
2024	164 / 175	▲140	55.30	▲9.74	18,656,300

Party-wise results
Party	Popular vote			Seats		
Party	Votes	%	±pp	Contested	Won	+/−
Telugu Desam Party	15,384,576	45.60	▲6.43	144	135	▲112
Janasena Party	2,317,747	6.87	▲1.32	21	21	▲20
Bharatiya Janata Party	953,977	2.83	▲1.99	10	8	▲8
Total	18,656,300	55.30	9.74	175	164	140

== See also ==
- Maha Kutami (2009)
- Praja Kutami (2018)
