= P. V. N. Madhav =

Indian politician

President of Bharatiya Janata Party - Andhra Pradesh
- Incumbent
- Assumed office 1 July 2025
- President: J. P. Nadda; Nitin Nabin
- Preceded by: Daggubati Purandeswari

Member of Andhra Pradesh Legislative Council
- In office 30 March 2017 – 29 March 2023
- Preceded by: M. V. S. Sarma
- Succeeded by: V. Chiranjeevi Rao
- Constituency: Srikakulam-Vizag-Vizianagaram Graduates

Personal details
- Born: Pokala Vamsi Nagendra Madhav; 10 August 1973 (age 53) Maddilapalem, Visakhapatnam, Andhra Pradesh (1956–2014)
- Party: Bharatiya Janata Party
- Parents: P. V. Chalapati Rao (father); P. Anuradha (mother)
- Education: B.Com, MBA, CMA
- Alma mater: Dr. V. S. Krishna Govt. Degree & P.G College; Andhra University; Institute of Cost Accountants of India
- Profession: Politician

Pokala Vamsi Nagendra Madhav is a Bharatiya Janata Party politician from Andhra Pradesh. He is the current state president of the Bharatiya Janata Party (BJP) in Andhra Pradesh.

Madhav has been elected in Andhra Pradesh Legislative Council election in 2017 from Graduates constituency as candidate of Bharatiya Janata Party. A cost accountant by profession, Madhav has long-standing ties to the Sangh Parivar, having been active in the ABVP and BJYM from an early age. He is well known for his strong association with the Rashtriya Swayamsevak Sangh (RSS). He has played an active role in the party's growth at the grassroots. His father, P. V. Chalapati Rao, was the first BJP state president of undivided Andhra Pradesh and a founding member of the party in the state.

== Biodata ==
[3][4][5][6]
