= P. V. Parthasarathi =

Indian politician

Podala Venkata Parthasarathi
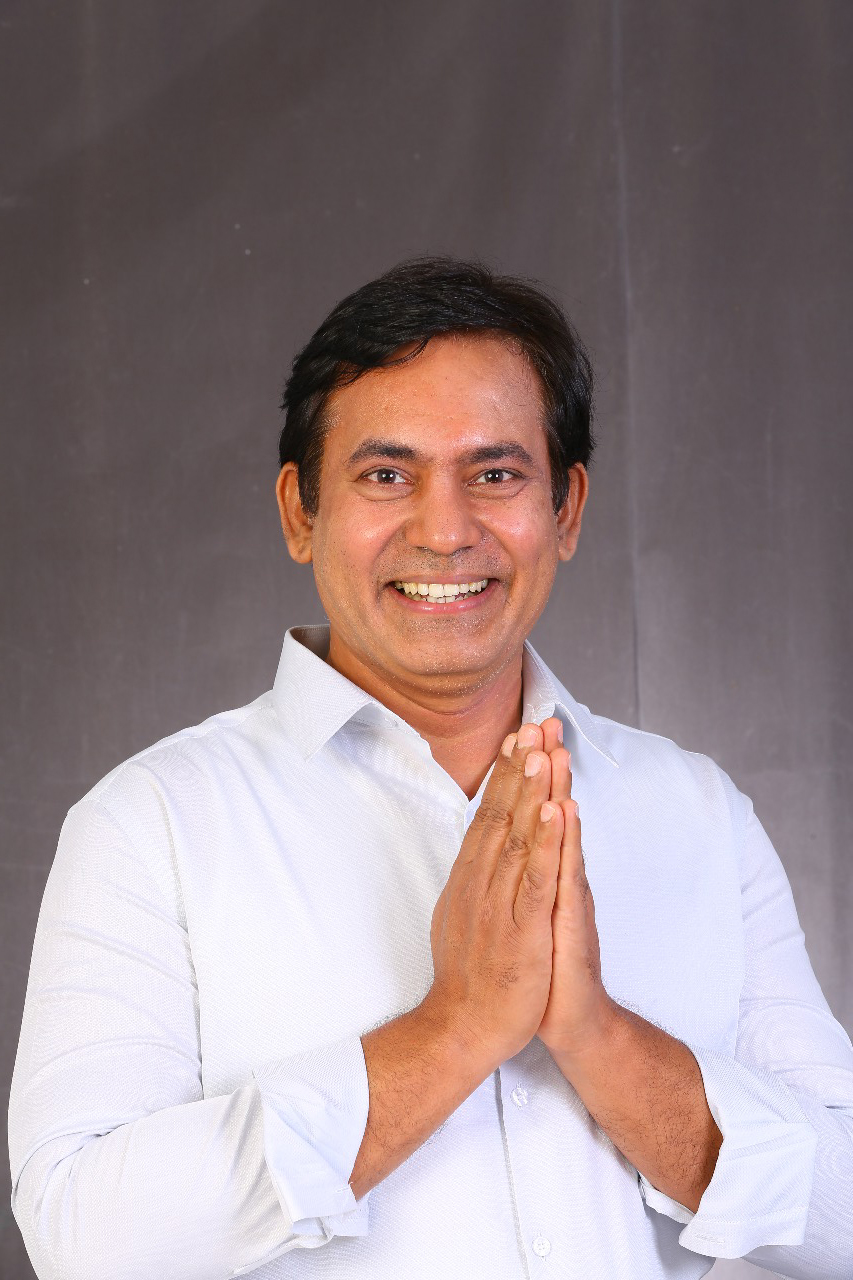
- Parthasarathi in July 2021

Member of Legislative Assembly Andhra Pradesh
- Incumbent
- Assumed office 4 June 2024
- Preceded by: Y. Sai Prasad Reddy
- Constituency: Adoni

Personal details
- Party: Bharatiya Janata Party

Podala Venkata Parthasarathi (born 1971) is an Indian politician from Andhra Pradesh. He is an MLA from Adoni Assembly constituency in Kurnool district. He represents Bharatiya Janata Party. He won the 2024 Andhra Pradesh Legislative Assembly election where BJP had an alliance with TDP and Janasena Party.

== Early life and education ==
Parthasarathi is from Adoni. He is a dentist. His father is P. V. Narasimhulu. His wife is also a doctor. He completed his post graduation in Pedodontics in 1997 at Government Dental College, Hyderabad, which is affiliated with Dr. NTR University of Health Sciences, Vijayawada.

== Political career ==
Parthasarathi won the 2024 Andhra Pradesh Legislative Assembly election from Adoni on Bharatiya Janata Party ticket. He polled 89,929 votes and defeated his nearest rival and sitting MLA, Y. Sai Prasad Reddy, of YSR Congress Party by a margin of 18,164 votes.
