= Konka Meenakshi Naidu =

Indian politician

Konka Meenakshi Naidu is an Indian politician and ex MLA of Adoni. He was born on 25 October 1951 in Chinnahoturu village to Konka Anjaiah Naidu and Konka Nagamma. His first contest in 1989, was for Adoni. He is currently (2017) affiliated with the Telugu Desam Party. He studied Intermediate and degree (XII Standard) in Adoni Arts and Science College.

== Political career ==
In 1983 he joined the Telugu desam party. He contested in 1989 he lost and he won in 1994 and 1999 and in 2004 he did not contested and in 2009 he won against Y. Sai Prasad reddy and in 2014 as well as in 2019 he lost against Y. Sai Prasad Reddy of YSRCP party.
