= Tirupati–Narasapur Express =

Train in India

Overview
- Service type: Express
- Status: Active
- Locale: Andhra Pradesh
- First service: 3 May 2026; 42 days ago
- Current operator: South Coast Railway (SCoR)

Route
- Termini: Tirupati (TPTY); Narasapur (NS)
- Stops: 14
- Distance travelled: 526 km (327 mi)
- Average journey time: 11h 20m
- Service frequency: Weekly
- Train number: 17427 / 17428

On-board services
- Classes: General Unreserved, Sleeper Class, AC 3rd Class, AC 2nd Class
- Seating arrangements: Yes
- Sleeping arrangements: Yes
- Catering facilities: Pantry Car
- Observation facilities: Large windows
- Baggage facilities: No
- Other facilities: Below the seats

Technical
- Rolling stock: LHB coach
- Track gauge: 1,676 mm (5 ft 6 in)
- Electrification: 25 kV 50 Hz AC Overhead line
- Operating speed: 130 km/h (81 mph) maximum, 46 km/h (29 mph) average including halts.
- Track owner: Indian Railways
Route map
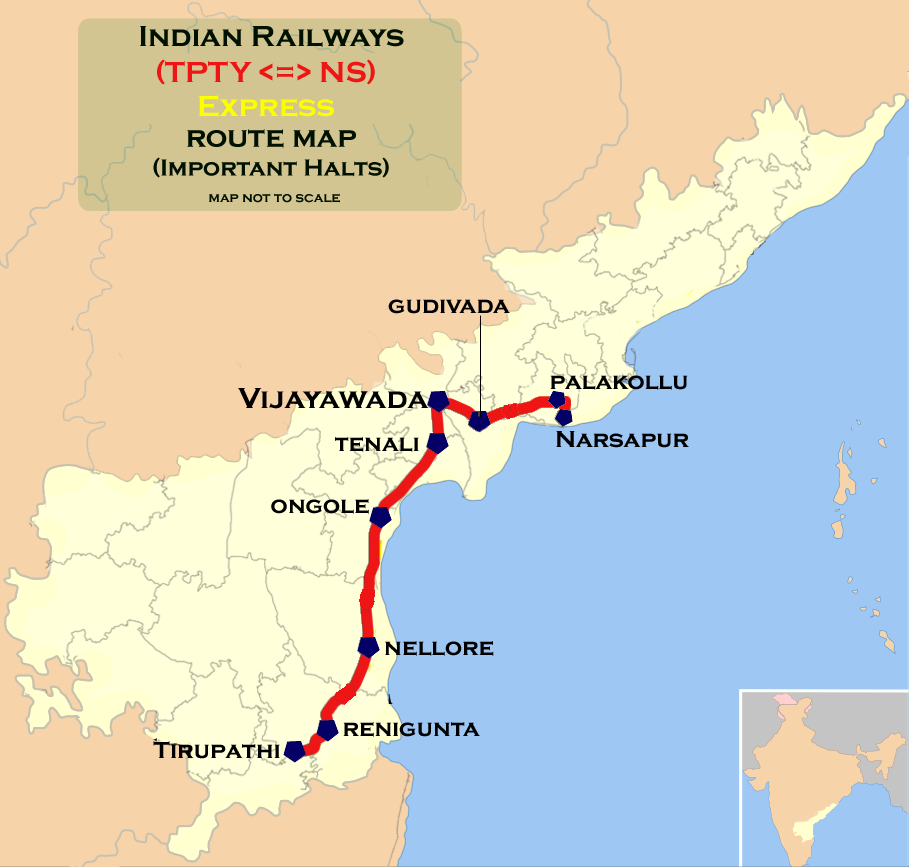

The 17427 / 17428 Tirupati–Narasapur Express is an express train belonging to South Coast Railway zone that runs between the city Tirupati and Narasapur of Andhra Pradesh in India.

It operates as train number 17427 from Tirupati to Narasapur and as train number 17428 in the reverse direction, serving the states of Andhra Pradesh.

== Services ==
• 17427/ Tirupati–Narasapur Express has an average speed of 46 km/h and covers 526 km in 11h 20m.

• 17428/ Narasapur–Tirupati Express has an average speed of 44 km/h and covers 526 km in 11h 50m.

== Route and halts ==
The important halts of the train are :

- Tiruputi
- Renigunta Junction
- Nellore
- Ongole
- Chirala
- Tenali Junction
- Vijayawada Junction
- Gudivada Junction
- Kaikaluru
- Akividu
- Bhimavaram Town Halt
- Palakollu
- Narasapur

== Schedule ==
• 17427 – 10:10 pm (Sunday) [Tirupati]

• 17428 – 3:50 pm (Monday) [Narasapur]

== Coach composition ==
Loco	1	2	3	4	5	6	7	8	9	10	11	12	13	14	15	16	17	18	19	20	21	22
	SLRD	GEN	GEN	A1	A2	B1	B2	B3	B4	B5	B6	B7	S1	S2	S3	S4	S5	S6	S7	GEN	GEN	EOG

== Traction ==
As the entire route is fully electrified, it is hauled by a Royapuram Shed-based WAP-7 electric locomotive from Tirupati to Narasapur and vice versa.

== Rake reversal or rake share ==
The train will Rake Sharing with Kollam–Tirupati Express (17421/17422).

== See also ==
Trains from Tirupati :

1. Howrah–Tirupati Humsafar Express
2. Tirupati–Srikakulam Road Humsafar Express
3. Tirupati–Sainagar Shirdi Weekly Express (via Guntur)
4. Padmavati Express
5. Tirupati–Vasco da Gama Express

Trains from Narasapur :

1. Narasapur–Nagarsol Express (via Warangal)
2. Narasapur–Nagarsol Express (via Guntur)
3. MGR Chennai Central–Narasapur Vande Bharat Express
4. Narasapur–Hyderabad Express
5. Narasapur–Nidadavolu Express

== Notes ==
a. Runs one day in a week with both directions.
