= Tirupati–Narsapur Express =

Tirupati–Narasapur Express
Overview
- Service type: Express
- Current operator: South Coast Railway zone

Route
- Termini: Tirupati (TPTY); Narasapuram (NS)
- Stops: 14
- Distance travelled: 526 km (327 mi)
- Average journey time: 10h 35m
- Service frequency: Weekly
- Train number: 17427/17428

On-board services
- Classes: AC 2 tier, AC 3 tier, Sleeper class, General Unreserved
- Seating arrangements: No
- Sleeping arrangements: Yes
- Catering facilities: On-board catering E-catering
- Observation facilities: LHB coach
- Entertainment facilities: No
- Baggage facilities: No
- Other facilities: Below the seats

Technical
- Rolling stock: 2
- Track gauge: 1,676 mm (5 ft 6 in)
- Operating speed: 50 km/h (31 mph), including halts
Route map
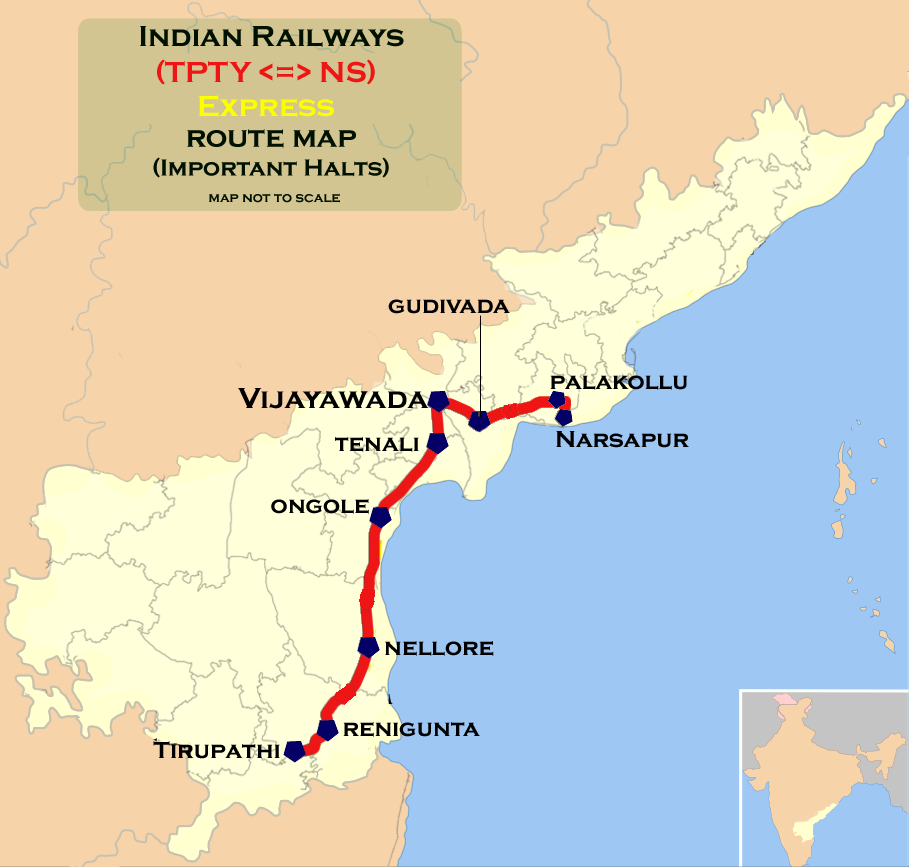

The Tirupati–Narsapur Express is an Express train belonging to South Coast Railway zone that runs between Tirupati and Narasapuram in India. It is currently being operated with 17427/17428 train numbers on a weekly basis.

== Service ==
The 17427/Tirupati–Narsapur Express has an average speed of 50 km/h and covers 526 km in 10h 35m. The 17428/Narasapur–Tirupati Express has an average speed of 46 km/h and covers 526 km in 11h 20m.

== Route and halts ==
The important halts of the train are:

- Tirupati
- Renigunta Junction
- Nellore
- Ongole
- Tenali Junction
- Vijayawada Junction
- Gudivada Junction
- Bhimavaram Town
- Bhimavaram Junction
- Narasapuram

== Coach composition ==
The train has standard LHB rakes with a max speed of 130 kmph. The train consists of 21 coaches:

- 7 AC III Tier
- 7 Sleeper coaches
- 2 AC II Tier
- 4 General Unreserved
- 1 Engine Generator Car

== Traction ==
Both trains are hauled by a Vijayawada Loco Shed based WAM-4P electric locomotive from Tirupati to Narasapur.

== Rake sharing ==
The train shares its rake with 17421/17422 Kollam–Tirupati Express.

== See also ==
- Tirupati railway station
- Narasapur railway station
