= Narasapur–Lingampalli Express =

Narasapur Express
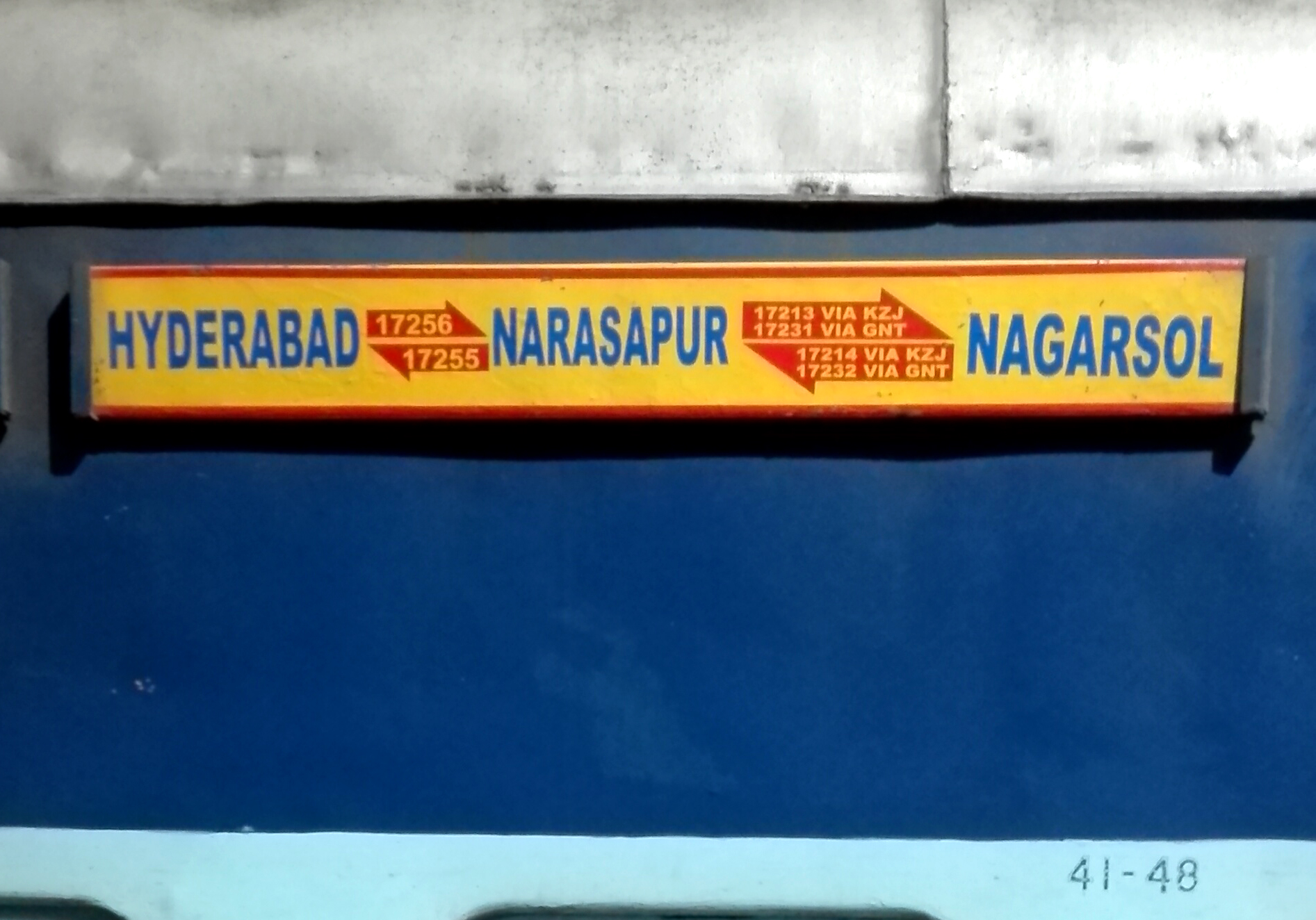

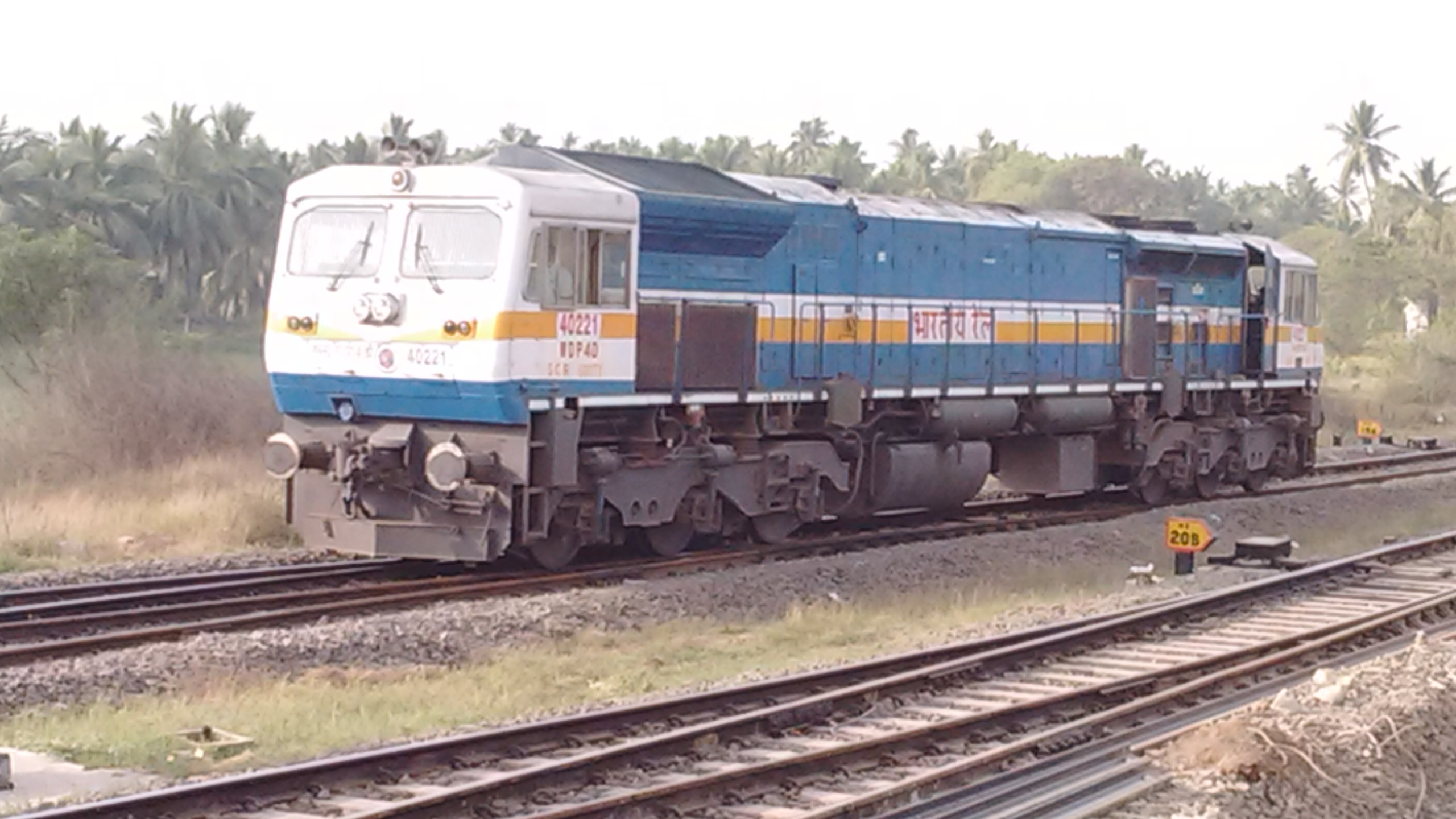
- Name board of Narsapur Express (above); Diesel locomotive of Narsapur Express

Overview
- Service type: Express Train
- Status: Operating
- Locale: Andhra Pradesh, Telangana
- First service: 1 October 1979; 46 years ago
- Current operator: South Central Railway
- Ridership: Sleeper - 456; Third Class - 189; Second Class - 12; First Class - 12; Total - 539

Route
- Termini: Narasapur; Lingampalli
- Stops: 16
- Distance travelled: 474 km (295 mi)
- Average journey time: 10 hours, 15 minutes
- Service frequency: Daily
- Train number: 17255/17256

On-board services
- Classes: AC 1, 2, 3, Sleeper, General
- Seating arrangements: Indian Rail standard
- Sleeping arrangements: Yes
- Catering facilities: No Pantry car, Paid Food service is available
- Baggage facilities: Below the seats, Brake van

Technical
- Track gauge: Broad-1,676 mm (5 ft 6 in)
- Electrification: Yes
- Operating speed: 46 km/h (29 mph) Average including all halts
- Rake sharing: (Narsapur - Nagarsol) Express
Route map
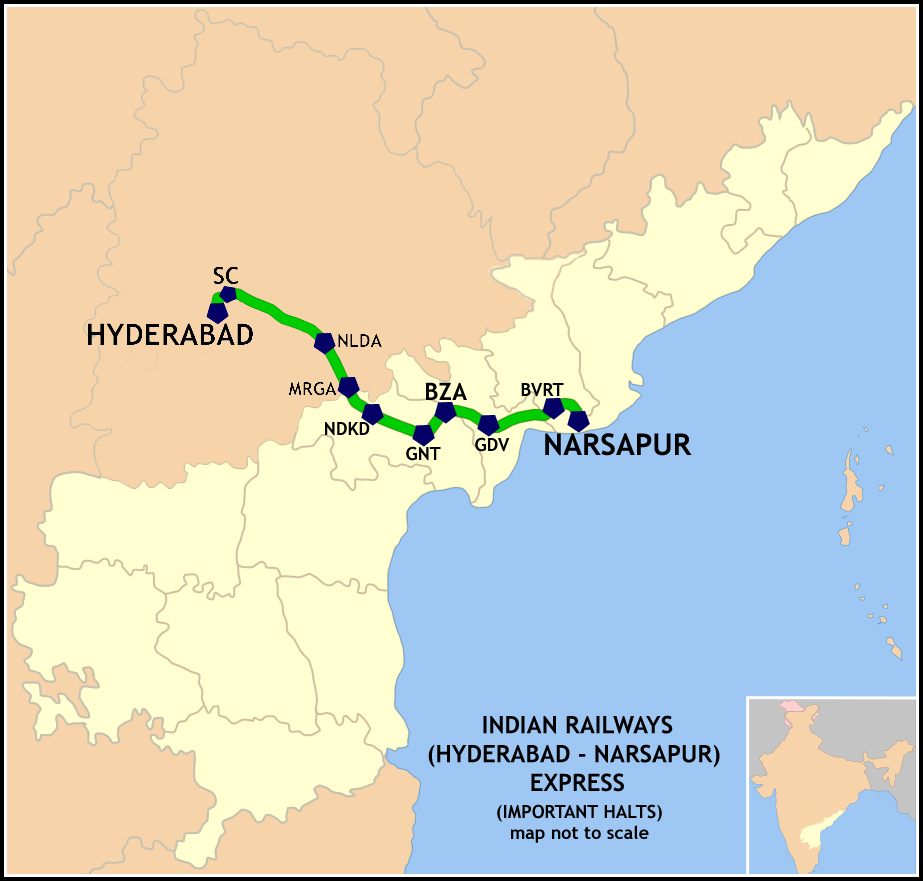
- (Hyderabad - Narsapur) Express Route map Narsapur Express route map with important halts.

Narasapur Express Train.No.17255/17256 Narasapur-Lingampalli is a Daily Train. Narasapur Express is one of the busiest trains, running with 25 coaches at full capacity at all times. It has 16 halts between Lingampalli and Narasapur. Narasapur Express is considered to be one of the most important and prestigious trains of South Coast Railway(SCOR) which connects the Telangana state gateway of Hyderabad's IT corridor Lingampalli with the Narasapuram of Andhra Pradesh and is operated with 17255/17256 as train numbers. The train is considered the best way between the two cities and coaches is maintained very neatly by the South Coast Railway.

The train departs from Lingampalli at 21:00 hours and arrives in Narasapuram at 08:15 hours the next day. From Narasapuram, train departs at 19:00 hours and arrives in Lingampalli at 05:15 hours the next day. Train run with 8 air-conditioned coaches. The train operates daily and covers a distance of 474 km, via Bhimavaram, Gudivada, Vijayawada, Guntur, Nalgonda, Secunderabad. This train is full entire year still South Coast Railway (SCOR) didn't provide more trains in this route.

== Loco ==
- It is regularly hauled by WAP-4/WAP-7 Hyderabad to Narasapur

== Coach composition ==
A rake of the Narasapur Express consists of 25 Coaches. It has one 1AC coach, 2 AC 2-Tier Coaches, 5 AC 3-Tier Coaches, 12 Sleeper Class Coaches, 3 General Compartments and 2SLR's.

Loco	1	2	3	4	5	6	7	8	9	10	11	12	13	14	15	16	17	18	19	20	21	22	23	24
	SLRD	GEN	H1	A2	A1	B5	B4	B3	B2	B1	S12	S11	S10	S9	S8	S7	S6	S5	S4	S3	S2	S1	GEN	SLRD

== Routeing ==
1. Lingampalli
2. Begumpet
3. Secunderabad
4. Bibinagar
5. Nalgonda
6. Guntur
7. Mangalagiri
8. Vijayawada
9. Gudivada
10. Mandavalli
11. Kaikaluru
12. Akividu
13. Bhimavaram Town
14. Bhimavaram Junction
15. Veeravasaram
16. Palakollu
17. Narasapur

== Rake Sharing ==
The Rake is shared by Narasapur–Nagarsol Express (via Guntur)

== See also ==
- Indian locomotives
