= Lankalakoderu Halt railway station =

Railway station in Andhra Pradesh, India

General information
- Coordinates: 16.5343°N 81.6811°E
Location

Lankalakoderu Halt (station code: LKDU) is a railway station in Andhra Pradesh, India, on the Narasapuram –Bhimavaram branch railway between Veeravasaram and Chintaparru Halt stations. It is close to National Highway 216 and is a walkable distance from Areas Bhageswaram-Poolapalli located on NH 216. This railway station is administered under Vijayawada railway division of South Coast Railway Zone.
