= Narasapur–Nidadavolu Express =

Overview
- Service type: Express
- First service: 20 March 2018
- Current operator: South Coast Railways

Route
- Termini: Narasapur; Nidadavolu Junction
- Stops: 6
- Distance travelled: 76 km (47 mi)
- Average journey time: 2 hours 6 mins
- Service frequency: Daily
- Train number: 17241 / 17242

On-board services
- Class: General
- Sleeping arrangements: No
- Catering facilities: No pantry car attached

Technical
- Rolling stock: ICF coach
- Track gauge: 1,676 mm (5 ft 6 in)
- Operating speed: 140 km/h (87 mph) maximum,37 km/h (23 mph), including halts

Narasapur–Nidadavolu Express is an Express train belonging to South Coast Railway zone of Indian Railways that runs between Narasapur and Nidadavolu Junction of Andhra Pradesh state in India.

== Background ==
It was running as Narasapur–Visakhapatnam Link Express but due to high passenger demand, it was delinked from Simhadri Express and ran as Narasapur–Nidadavolu DEMU, numbered 77275 / 77276, on 20 March 2018. But due to some passenger security reasons, it was converted into an Express train on 15 August 2018.

== Service ==
The frequency of this train is daily, it covers the distance of 76 km with an average speed of 37 km/h.

== Routes ==
This train passes through Bhimavaram Junction on both sides.

== Traction ==
As this route is currently going to be electrified, a WDP-4 locomotive pulls the train to its destination on both sides.
