= MGR Chennai Central–Narasapur Vande Bharat Express =

Mini Vande Bharat Express train route in India

MGR Chennai Central - Narasapur Vande Bharat Express
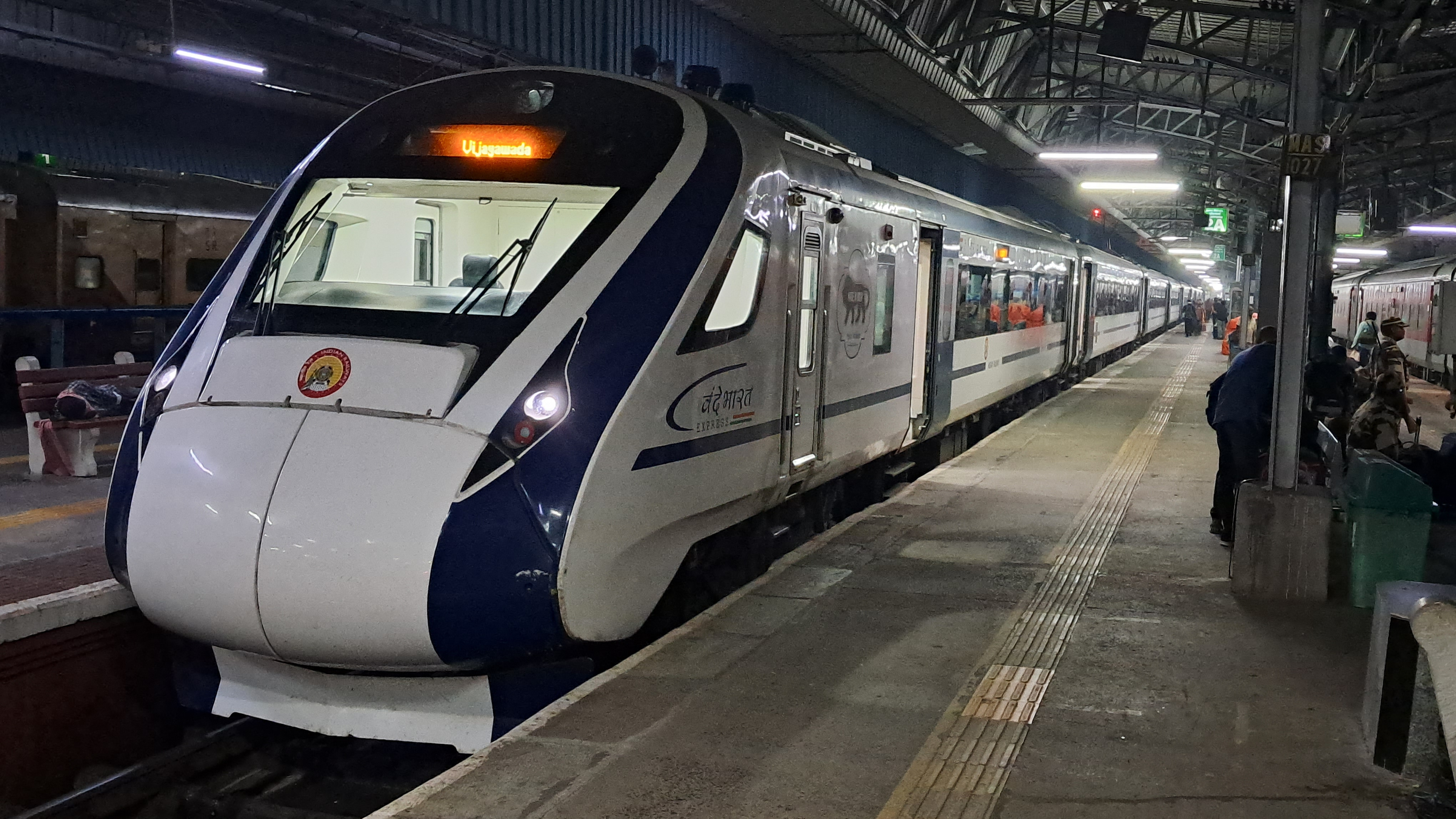
- This Mini VB Express train standing at MGR Chennai Central & heading towards Narasapur

Overview
- Service type: Vande Bharat Express
- Locale: Tamil Nadu and Andhra Pradesh
- First service: 24 September 2023 (Inaugural run); 25 September 2023; 2 years ago (Commercial run) (Extension to Narasapur); 15 December 2025; 9 months ago
- Current operator: Southern Railway (SR)

Route
- Termini: MGR Chennai Central (MAS); Narasapur (NS)
- Stops: 7 (after extn to Narasapur)
- Distance travelled: 652 km (405 mi)
- Average journey time: 08 hrs 40 mins
- Service frequency: Six days a week (Note: Except Tuesdays)
- Train number: 20677 / 20678
- Lines used: Chennai–Banglore line (till Arakkonam Jn.); Renigunta–Gudur section; Gudur–Vijayawada section; Vijayawada–Nidadavolu loop line (Till Bhimavaram Town); Bhimavaram–Narasapur branch line

On-board services
- Classes: AC Chair Car, AC Executive Chair Car
- Seating arrangements: Airline style; Rotatable seats
- Sleeping arrangements: No
- Catering facilities: E Catering services, On board Catering
- Observation facilities: Large windows in all coaches
- Entertainment facilities: On-board WiFi; Infotainment System; Electric outlets; Reading light; Seat Pockets; Bottle Holder; Tray Table
- Baggage facilities: Overhead racks
- Other facilities: Kavach

Technical
- Rolling stock: Mini Vande Bharat 2.0
- Track gauge: Indian gauge 1,676 mm (5 ft 6 in) broad gauge
- Electrification: 25 kV 50 Hz AC Overhead line
- Operating speed: 75 km/h (47 mph)
- Average length: 192 metres (630 ft) (08 coaches)
- Track owner: Indian Railways
- Rake maintenance: Basin Bridge Junction (BBQ)

The 20677/20678 MGR Chennai Central - Narasapur Vande Bharat Express is India's 27th Vande Bharat Express train, connecting the city of Chennai city in Tamil Nadu with Narasapur in Andhra Pradesh. This train was inaugurated on 24 September 2023 by Prime Minister Narendra Modi via video conference from New Delhi.

== Overview ==
This train is operated by Indian Railways, connecting MGR Chennai Central, Renigunta Jn, Nellore, Ongole, Tenali Jn, Vijayawada Jn, Gudivada Jn, Bhimavaram Town and Narasapur. It is currently operated with train numbers 20677/20678 on 6 days a week basis.

On 12 November 2025, Southern Railways officially announced that this express train would be further extended to Narasapur and will commence from 15 December 2025.The train was extended from Vijayawada to Narasapur to improve rail connectivity between Chennai and the West Godavari region of Andhra Pradesh, providing direct Vande Bharat service to Gudivada, Bhimavaram Town, and Narasapur.

== Rakes ==
It is the twenty-fifth 2nd Generation and thirteenth Mini Vande Bharat 2.0 Express train which was designed and manufactured by the Integral Coach Factory at Perambur, Chennai under the Make in India Initiative.

== Service ==
The 20677/20678 MGR Chennai Ctrl - Vijayawada - Narasapur Vande Bharat Express operates six days a week except Tuesdays, covering a distance of 514 km (319 mi) in a travel time of 6 hours with an average speed of 77 km/h (48 mph). The service has 4 intermediate stops. The Maximum Permissible Speed is 130 km/h (81 mph).

== See also ==
- Vande Bharat Express
- Tejas Express
- Gatimaan Express
- Chennai Central railway station
- Vijayawada Junction railway station
