= Narasapur–SSS Hubballi Amaravati Express =

Overview
- Service type: Express
- Current operator: South Coast Railway zone

Route
- Termini: Narasapur (NS); Hubballi Junction (UBL)
- Stops: 26
- Distance travelled: 830 km (516 mi)
- Average journey time: 19h 10m
- Service frequency: Daily (Note: Runs seven days in a weekdirection.)
- Train number: 17225/17226

On-board services
- Classes: AC 2 tier, AC 3 tier, Sleeper class, General Unreserved
- Seating arrangements: No
- Sleeping arrangements: Yes
- Catering facilities: On-board catering E-catering
- Observation facilities: ICF coach
- Entertainment facilities: No
- Baggage facilities: No
- Other facilities: Below the seats

Technical
- Rolling stock: 2
- Track gauge: 1,676 mm (5 ft 6 in)
- Operating speed: 50 km/h (31 mph), including halts

The Narasapur–SSS Hubballi Amaravati Express is a daily express train operated by Indian Railways between Narasapur in Andhra Pradesh and SSS Hubballi Junction in Karnataka. It is numbered 17225 in the Narasapur–Hubballi direction and 17226 in the reverse direction.

== History ==
The service originated in the 1950s as a metre-gauge train between Guntur and Hubli. It was upgraded to an express service between 1987 and 1990 and was subsequently named the Amaravati Express. The service was extended to Vijayawada in 1994.

The service was extended to Narasapur with effect from 13 January 2024, with train numbers 17225 and 17226 operating between Narasapur and SSS Hubballi Junction.

== Service ==
Train 17225 runs daily from Narasapur to SSS Hubballi Junction, covering approximately 830 km in about 19 hours and 10 minutes. Train 17226 operates daily in the reverse direction.

== Route and halts ==
The principal stations served by the train include:

- Narasapur
- Bhimavaram Town
- Vijayawada Junction
- Guntur Junction
- Guntakal Junction
- Ballari Junction
- Gadag Junction
- Hubballi Junction

== Coach composition ==
The train currently operates with a 22-coach ICF rake, comprising:

- 1 AC 2-tier coach
- 4 AC 3-tier coaches
- 10 Sleeper coaches
- 5 General Unreserved coaches
- 2 SLRD coaches

== Traction ==
The train is hauled by electric locomotives from Vijayawada Loco Shed.

== See also ==
- Amaravati Express
