= Narasapur–Nagarsol Express (via Warangal) =

Passenger train in India

Nagarsol Narsapur Superfast Express (via Warangal)
Overview
- Service type: Superfast
- Current operator: South Coast Railway zone

Route
- Termini: Narasapur; Nagarsol
- Stops: 20
- Distance travelled: 1,075 km (668 mi)
- Average journey time: 19 hours 45 mins
- Service frequency: Five days in a week
- Train number: 12787 / 12788

On-board services
- Classes: AC First Class, AC 2 Tier, AC 3 Tier, Sleeper Class & General Unreserved
- Seating arrangements: Yes
- Sleeping arrangements: Yes
- Catering facilities: No pantry car attached

Technical
- Rolling stock: Standard Indian Railways coaches
- Track gauge: 1,676 mm (5 ft 6 in)
- Operating speed: 54 km/h (34 mph)
Route map
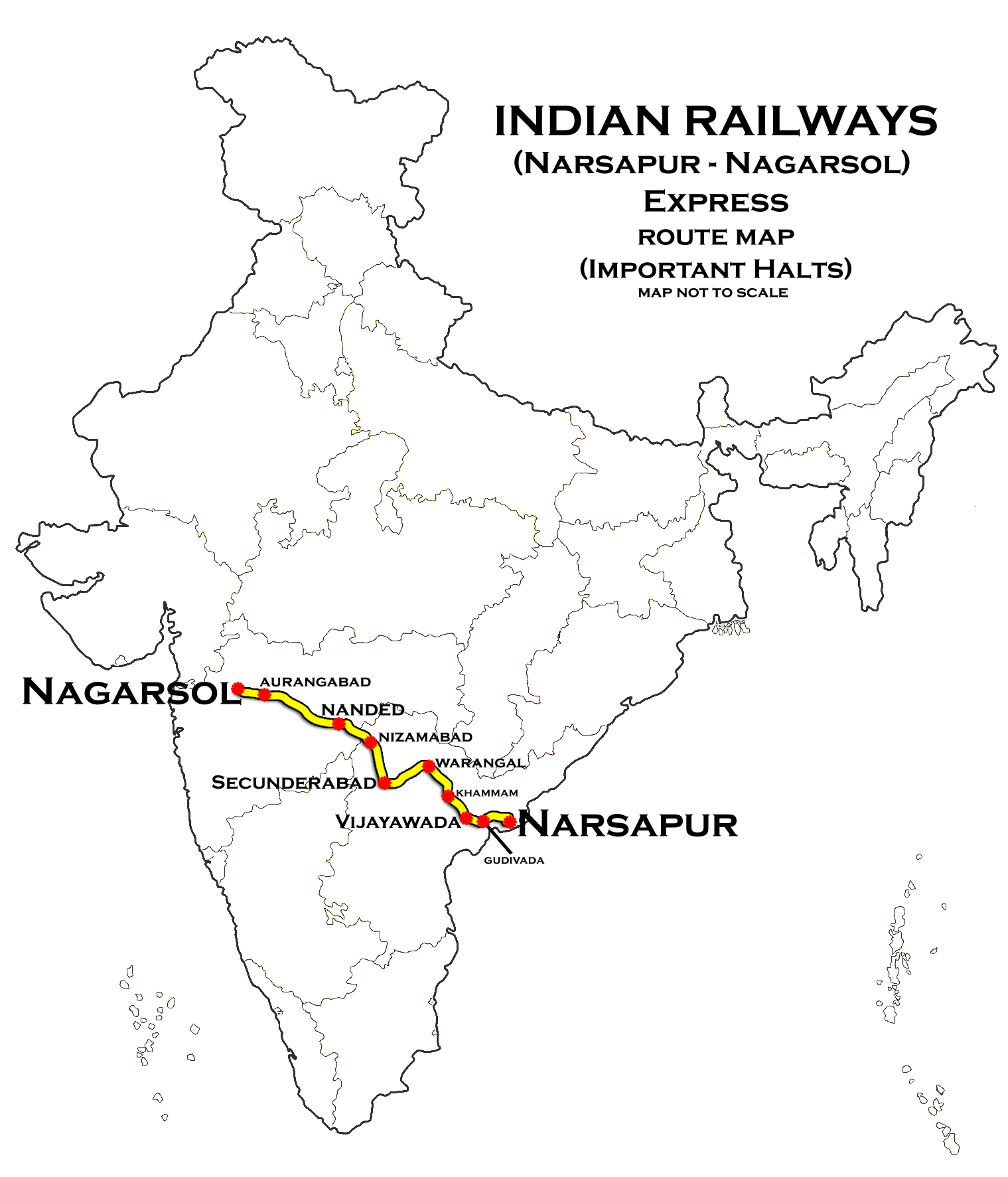

12787 / 88 Narasapur–Nagarsol Superfast Express is an express train belonging to South Coast Railway zone that runs between Narasapuram and Nagarsol in India.

== Service ==
It operates as train number 12787 from Narasapuram to Nagarsol and as train number 12788 in the reverse direction, serving the states of Andhra Pradesh, Telangana & Maharashtra. The train covers the distance of 1,085 km (674 mi) in 19 hours 45 mins approximately at a speed of (54 km/h (34 mph)).

== Coaches ==
The 12787 / 88 Narasapuram–Nagarsol superfast Express has one AC First Class, two AC 2-tier, five AC 3-tier, 12 sleeper class, two general unreserved & two SLRD (seating with luggage rake) coaches. It doesn't carry a pantry car.

As with most train services in India, coach composition may be amended at the discretion of Indian Railways depending on demand.

== Routeing ==
The 12787/ 88 Narasapuram Nagarsol superfast Express runs from Narasapuram via Bhimavaram Town, Vijayawada Junction, Warangal, Kazipet Junction, charlapalli, Nizamabad Junction, Hazur Sahib Nanded, Parbhani Junction, Jalna, Chhatrapati Sambhajinagar to Nagarsol.

== Traction ==
As this route is completely electrified it is hauled by WAP 7 of lalaguda or wap 4 of vijayawada shed this train permanently bypasses secunderabad to avoid reversal and joins nizamabad line via dayanand nagar line
