= Palakollu railway station =

Railway station in Andhra Pradesh, India

Palakollu
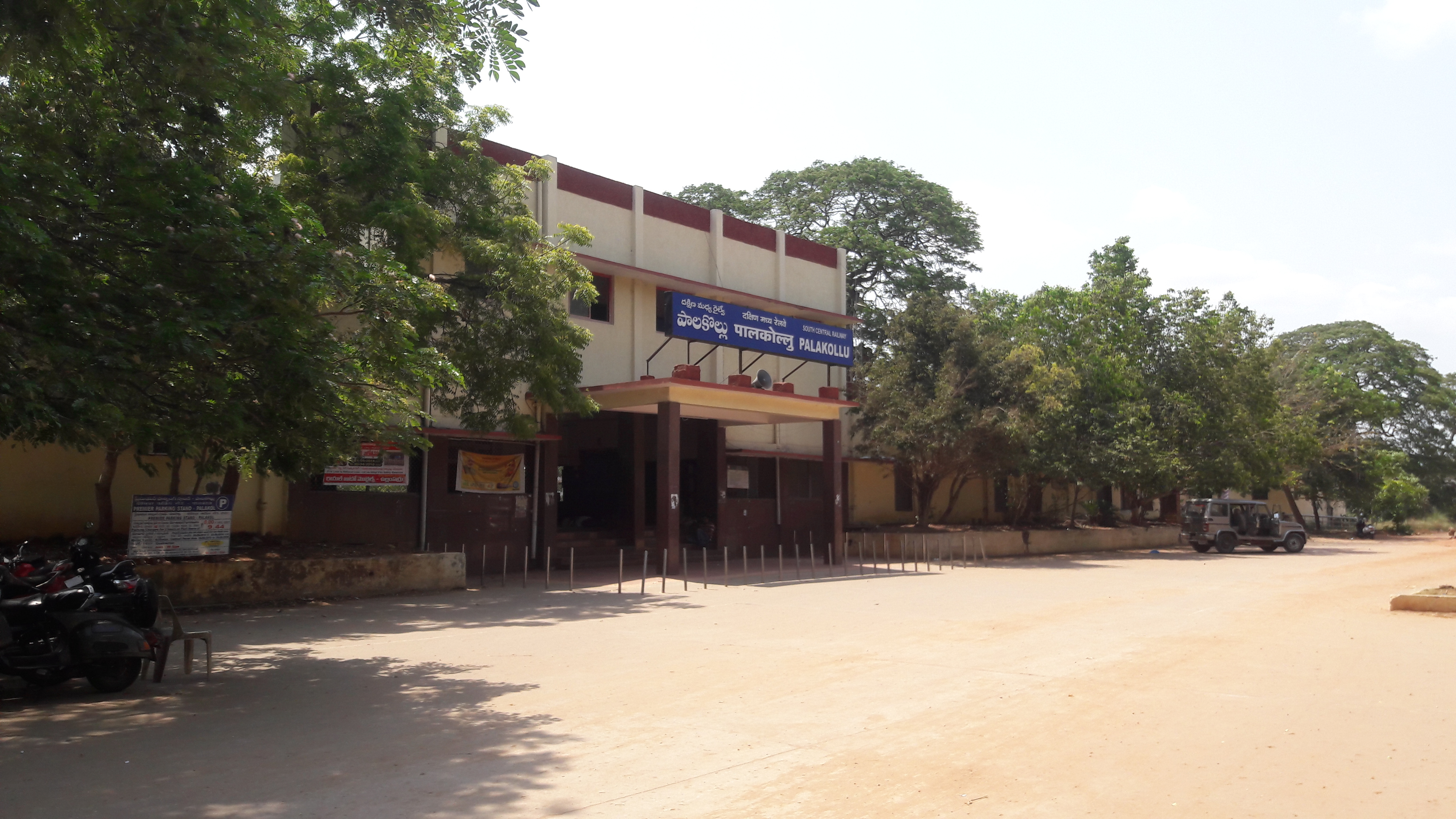
- Palakollu railway station

General information
- Location: Palakollu; West Godavari district Andhra Pradesh; India
- Coordinates: 16.5442°N 81.5375°E
- Elevation: 1.5 metres (4.9 ft)
- System: Indian Railways station
- Owner: Indian Railways
- Operator: South Coast Railway zone
- Lines: Vijayawada–Narsapur; Bhimavaram–Narasapuram branch line
- Platforms: 3
- Tracks: Three
- Connections: Bus stand, Taxicab stand

Construction
- Structure type: Standard (on-ground station)
- Parking: Available
- Accessible: Disabled access

Other information
- Status: Active
- Station code: PKO
- Fare zone: South Coast Railway zone
- Website: http://www.indianrailways.gov.in

History
- Opened: September 17, 1928; 97 years ago
Location
- Location within Andhra Pradesh Location within India
- Interactive map

Palakollu railway station (station code:PKO), is located in Palakollu of West Godavari district in the state of Andhra Pradesh. It belongs to South Coast Railway zone under Vijayawada railway division.

== History ==
GDV-NSP Broad gauge railway opened by Jagjivan Ram Railway Minister on 8 October 1961.

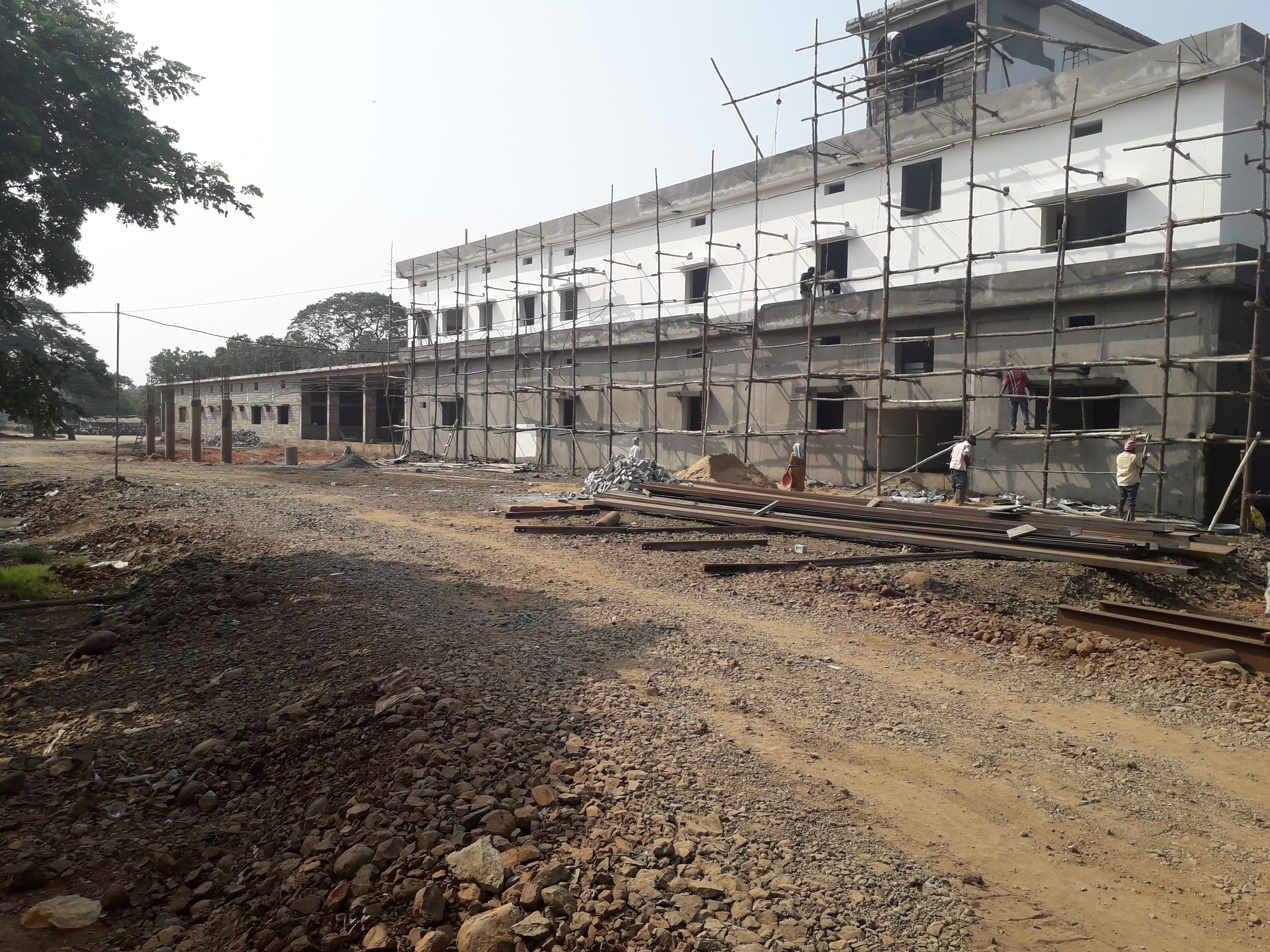
Palakollu Railway station New Platforms Construction

== Classification ==
Palakollu Railway station In terms of earnings and outward passengers handled, Palakollu Railway station is categorized as a Non-Suburban Grade-4 (NSG-4) railway station. Based on the re–categorization of Indian Railway stations for the period of 2017–18 and 2023–24, an NSG–4 category station earns between ₹10–₹20 crore and handles 2–5 million passengers.

== Station amenities ==
It is one of the 38 stations in the division to be equipped with Automatic Ticket Vending Machines (ATVMs).

Preceding station	Indian Railways	Following station
Gorintada towards ?	South Coast Railway zone Nidadavolu–Narsapur–Vijayawada branch line	Palakollu chintaparru towards ?
