= Gorintada railway station =

Railway station in Andhra Pradesh, India

Gorintada

General information
- Location: Gorintada, Andhra Pradesh; India
- Coordinates: 16°29′29″N 81°42′29″E
- System: Indian Railways station
- Platforms: 2
- Tracks: 5 ft 6 in (1,676 mm) broad gauge

Construction
- Structure type: Standard (on ground station)

Other information
- Status: Functioning
- Station code: GOTD
- Zone(s): South Central Railway
- Division(s): Vijayawada
Location
- Location within Andhra Pradesh Location within India
- Interactive map

Gorintada railway station (station code: GOTD), is situated on Narasapuram–Bhimavaram branch railway between Narasapuram and Palakollu stations. It is close to National Highway 216 and is a walkable distance from village Digamarru-Kothapeta located on NH 216.
