= Bhimavaram bus station =

Bus station in Andhra Pradesh, India

General information
- Location: Bhimavaram, West Godavari District, Andhra Pradesh; India
- Owner: APSRTC

Construction
- Parking: Yes

Other information
- Station code: BVRM

Bhimavaram bus station is a bus station located in Bhimavaram city of the Indian state of Andhra Pradesh. It is owned by Andhra Pradesh State Road Transport Corporation. This is one of the major bus stations in the district, with services to all towns and villages in the district and also to nearby cities in the state.
