= Narsapur =

Narasapur may refer to places in India:

== Geography ==
- Narasapuram, West Godavari district, Andhra Pradesh; also called Narsapur
- Narsapur, Peddapalli district, a village in Peddapalli district, Telangana
- Narsapur, Medak district, a village in Medak district, Telangana
- Narsapur, Nalgonda district, a village in Nalgonda district, Telangana
- Narsapur, Adilabad district, a village in Adilabad district, Telangana
- Narsapur, Karnataka
- Narasapur, Belgaum

== Politics ==
- Narsapur (Assembly constituency)
