= Chintaparru Halt railway station =

Railway station in Andhra Pradesh, India

Coordinates: 16.5343°N 81.6990°E

General information
- Owner: Indian railways
- Operator: South Coast railway
Location

Chintaparru Halt railway station is situated in Andhra Pradesh, India, on the Narasapuram –Bhimavaram branch railway between Veeravasaram and Palakollu stations. It is close to National Highway 216 and is a walkable distance from Areas Bhageswaram-Poolapalli located on NH 216. This railway station is administered under Vijayawada railway division of South Coast Railway Zone.
