= Narasapur–Nagarsol Express (via Guntur) =

Passenger train in India

Narasapur Nagarsol Express (via Guntur)
Overview
- Service type: Express
- Current operator: South Coast Railway zone

Route
- Termini: Narasapuram; Nagarsol
- Stops: 24
- Distance travelled: 1,048 km (651 mi)
- Average journey time: 23 hours 05 mins
- Service frequency: Bi-weekly
- Train number: 17231 / 17232

On-board services
- Classes: AC First Class, AC 2 Tier, AC 3 Tier, Sleeper Class & General Unreserved
- Seating arrangements: Yes
- Sleeping arrangements: Yes
- Catering facilities: No pantry car attached

Technical
- Rolling stock: Standard Indian Railways coaches
- Track gauge: 1,676 mm (5 ft 6 in)
- Operating speed: 44 km/h (27 mph)
Route map
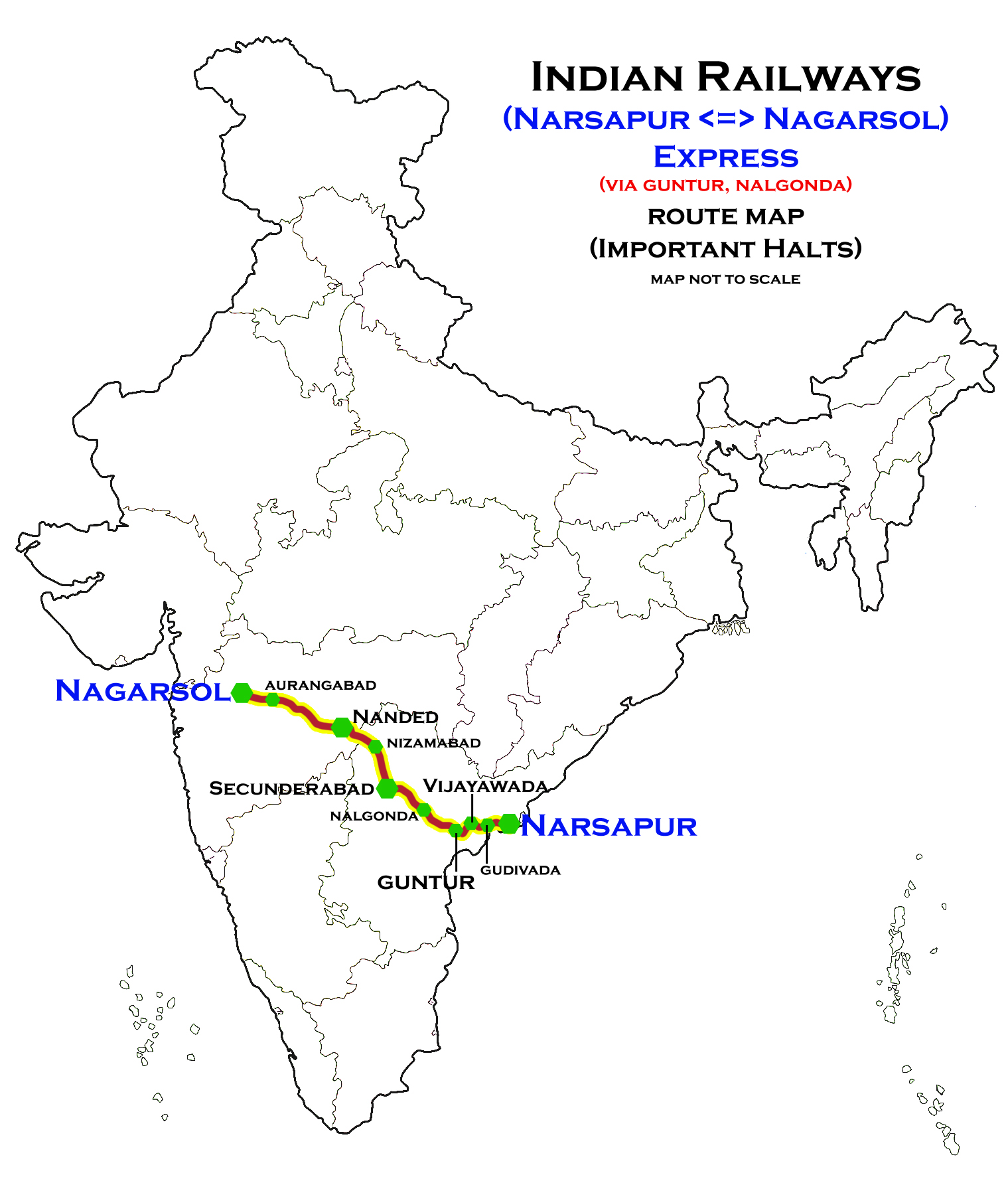

17231 / 32 Narasapur–Nagarsol Express is an express train belonging to South Coast Railway zone that runs between Narasapuram and Nagarsol in India.

== Service ==
It operates as train number 17231 from Narasapuram to Nagarsol and as train number 17232 in the reverse direction, serving the states of Andhra Pradesh, Telangana & Maharashtra. The train covers the distance of 1,048 km (651 mi) in 24 hours 00 mins approximately at a speed of (44 km/h (27 mph)).

== Coaches ==
The 17231 / 32 Narasapuram–Nagarsol Express has oneAC First class, one AC 2-tier, five AC 3-tier, 13 sleeper class, two general unreserved & two SLR (seating with luggage rake) coaches. It doesn't carry a pantry car.

As with most train services in India, coach composition may be amended at the discretion of Indian Railways depending on demand.

== Routeing ==
The 17231 / 32 Narasapuram Nagarsol Express runs from Narasapuram via Bhimavaram Town, Vijayawada Junction, Guntur Junction, Nadikudi, Secunderabad Junction, Nizamabad Junction, Hazur Sahib Nanded, Purna Junction, Parbhani Junction, Jalna, Chhatrapati Sambhajinagar to Nagarsol.

== Traction ==
As this route is going to be electrified, Runs With an electric Loco from Narasapur to Secunderabad and loco reversal at Secunderabad and diesel loco from Secunderabad-Nagarsol [[Electric Loco Shed, Vijayawada Electric Loco Shed, Based WAP4 AND Lallaguda Electric Loco Shed, based WAP7 and Diesel Loco Shed, Gooty|Gooty]]-based diesel WDP-4D loco pulls the train to its destination.
