= Narsapur, Nalgonda district =

Narsapur
- Village
- Country: India
- State: Telangana

Languages
  - Official: Telugu
- Time zone: UTC+5:30 (IST)
- Vehicle registration: TS
- Website: telangana.gov.in

Narsapur is a village in the Nalgonda District of Telangana, India. It falls under Atmakur mandal. Narsapur is about 1 400 kilometers south of New Delhi. The population is about 60 thousand and it lives 459 people per squarekilometer.

Outside of Narsapur the terrain is very flat. Narsapur is the biggest village in this area. In the area around Narsapur it is very many named canals. The climate makes the area mostly wetland.

Savanna is common around here and the yearly average is about 25 degrees Celsius or 77 degrees Fahrenheit. The average downfall is about 1 437 millimeters per year. The rainiest month is October with 354 millimeters downfall and the dryest is march with 2 millimeter downfall.
