= Narasapur railway station =

Railway station in Andhra Pradesh, India

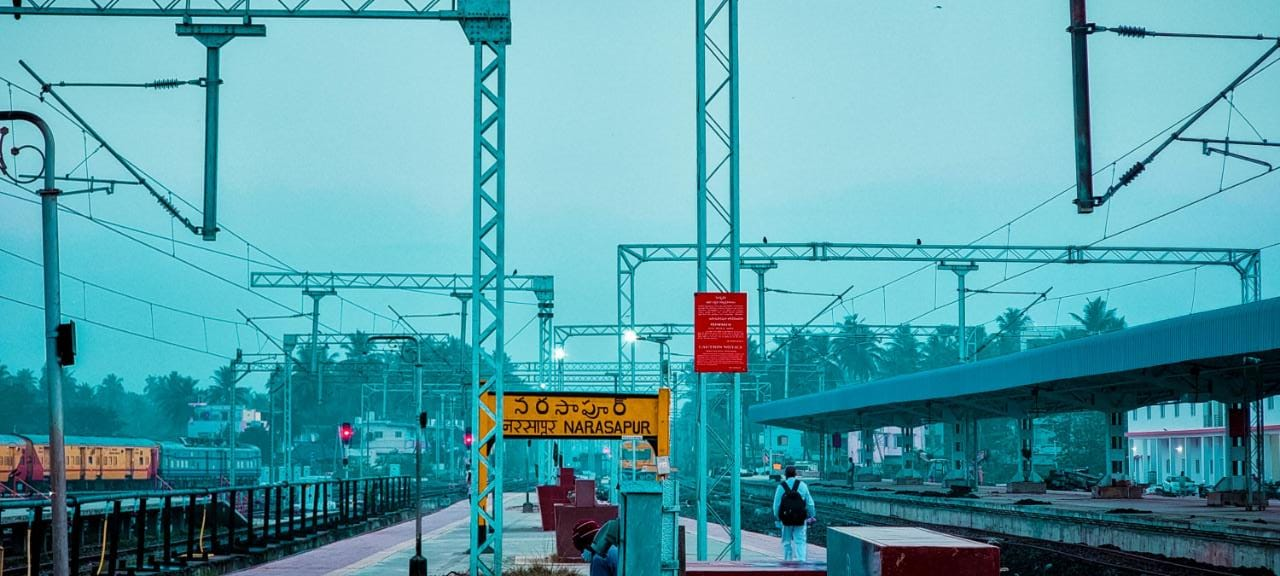

General information
- Location: Narasapuram, West Godavari district, Andhra Pradesh; India
- Coordinates: 16.110°N 80.4943°E
- System: Indian Railways station
- Operator: Indian Railways
- Line: Bhimavaram–Narasapur branch line
- Platforms: 3
- Tracks: 2

Construction
- Structure type: Terminus
- Accessible: Disabled access

Other information
- Status: Active
- Station code: NS
- Zone(s): South Central Railway zone
- Division(s): Vijayawada

Services
Preceding station	Indian Railways	Following station
Terminus	Bhimavaram–Narasapuram branch line	Palakollu towards ?
Location
- Location within Andhra Pradesh Location within India
- Interactive map

Narasapur railway station (station code:NS) is an Indian Railways station in Narasapuram town of Andhra Pradesh. It is a terminal station on the Bhimavaram–Narasapur branch line and is administered under Vijayawada railway division of South Coast Railway Zone.

== Classification ==
In terms of earnings and outward passengers handled, Narasapur is categorized as a Non-Suburban Grade-3 (NSG-3) railway station. Based on the re–categorization of Indian Railway stations for the period of 2017–18 and 2023–24, an NSG–3 category station earns between ₹20–₹100 crore and handles 5–10 million passengers.

== Station amenities ==
It is one of the 38 stations in the division to be equipped with Automatic Ticket Vending Machines (ATVMs).

== Originating express trains ==
Train No.	Train Name	Destination	Departure	Running	Route
17282	Guntur Express	Guntur Jn.	06:15	All Days	Bhimavaram Town, Gudivada Jn., Vijayawada Jn.
12787	Nagarsol Express (via Vijayawada)	Nagarsol	11:25	Mon, Tue, Wed, Thu, Sat	Bhimavaram Town, Gudivada Jn., Vijayawada Jn., Kazipet Jn., Secunderabad Jn., Nizamabad, H.S. Nanded., Aurangabad
17231	Nagarsol Express (via Guntur)	Nagarsol	11:25	Fri, Sun	Bhimavaram Town, Gudivada Jn., Vijayawada Jn., Guntur Jn., Nalgonda, Secunderabad Jn., Nizamabad., H.S. Nanded., Aurangabad.
17291	Tiruvannamalai Express	Tiruvannamalai	13:00	Wed	Bhimavaram Town, Gudivada Jn., Vijayawada Jn., Ongole., Nellore., Renigunta Jn., Tirupati., Katpadi Jn.
20678	MGR Chennai Central Vande Bharat Express	MGR Chennai Central	14:50	All Days Except Tuesday	Bhimavaram Town., Gudivada Jn., Vijayawada Jn., Tenali Jn., Ongole., Nellore., Renigunta Jn.
17293	SMVT Bengaluru Express	SMVT Bengaluru	15:50	Friday	Bhimavaram Town., Vijayawada Jn., Ongole., Gudur Jn., Renigunta Jn., Katpadi Jn., Bangarpet Jn.
17428	Tirupati Express	Tirupati	15:50	Monday	Bhimavaram Town., Vijayawada Jn., Ongole., Nellore., Gudur Jn., Renigunta Jn.
17225	SSS Hubballi Amaravati Express	SSS Hubballi.	16:20	All Days	Bhimavaram Town., Vijayawada Jn., Guntur Jn., Nandyal., Guntakal Jn., Hospate Jn.
17247	Dharmavaram Express	Dharmavaram Jn.	17:55	All Days	Bhimavaram Town., Gudivada Jn., Vijayawada Jn., Ongole., Nellore, Gudur Jn., Renigunta Jn., Tirupati, Pakala Jn.
17255	Lingampalli Express	Lingampalli	19.00	All Days	Bhimavaram Town., Gudivada Jn., Vijayawada Jn., Guntur Jn., Nalgonda, Secunderabad Jn.
17062	Charlapalli Express	Charlapalli	20:00	Sun	Bhimavaram Town., Gudivada Jn., Vijayawada Jn., Guntur Jn., Nalgonda.
