= Swami Jnanananda =

Indian nuclear physicist (1896-1969)

Swami Jnanananda born as Bhupathiraju Lakshminarasimha Raju (5 December 1896 – 21 September 1969) was an Indian yogi and nuclear physicist.

== Early childhood ==
He was born in a village Named Goraganamudi Near Bhimavaram. West Godavari district of Andhra Pradesh on 5 December 1896. After primary schooling, he joined in the Taylor High School, Narsapuram. His father, Rama Raju, was interested in Vedic and scholarly pursuits. His large collection of books and scriptures gave his son an opportunity to study them at an early age, deeply instigated from The Light of Asia, book written by Edwin Arnold. Swami Jnanananda was married by his father in 1916 but, inspired by the life of Gouthama Buddha, he renounced worldly pleasures and went to Lumbini, in Nepal. He has traveled many pilgrim centres in India for about 10 years.

== Philosopher ==
He spent around 10 years in the Himalayas and practised Yoga and studied Vedic Literature. He went to Germany with an interest in Physics. He studied Mathematics and Physics at Dresden. He took up research in High Tension and X-Ray Physics at Charles University, Prague. He was initiated as Swami Jnanananda by his guru, Swami Purnananda. He went to Germany in 1927 to deliver religious discourses and to get his religious works printed. His lectures attracted the attention of Prof. Dember at the Dresden University.

== Scientist ==
The Einstein's theory of relativity caught the attention of the swamiji. He requested Prof. Dember and successfully completed the undergraduate course in two years in 1929. He gave over 150 lectures on different subjects in yoga. His major work, `Purna Sutras', delivered in Germany were printed during this period.

He went to Czechoslovakia to work at the Charles University with Prof. Dolshek for about three years. His research at the university led to the development of precise methods in X-Ray spectroscopy for which he was awarded a D.Sc. in 1936.

He has shifted to England and joined University of Liverpool under Sir James Chadwick during the World War II. He has worked in Nuclear Physics, Spectroscopy of Beta Radiations and received his Ph.D. He continued his research on Beta Ray spectroscopy in the United States with a number of radioactive isotopes at the Michigan University. He completed his book on High Vacuum.

== Back to India ==
He returned to India in 1947 and joined as senior scientific officer at the National Physical Laboratory in Delhi. He met with an accident at Bhimavaram in 1954 and was admitted to the King George Hospital in Visakhapatnam. On the request of Vice-Chancellor of Andhra University, he joined the Physics Department for developing nuclear physics facilities in 1954. Nuclear Physics as a separate Department was started on 1 July 1956. He was promoted as Professor and Head of the Department. He continued in that position till 1965. The University authorities named the laboratory as "Swami Jnanananda Laboratories of Nuclear Research".

== Memorials ==
The Andhra University erected a statue in his honor, and named a lab after him.

== Sources ==
- Biography in Bhupathiraju website.
- Biography in Jnanananda Eye Institute.
- Copy of High Vacuum in Internet Archives.
