= Krishnam Raju Gadiraju =

Athlete

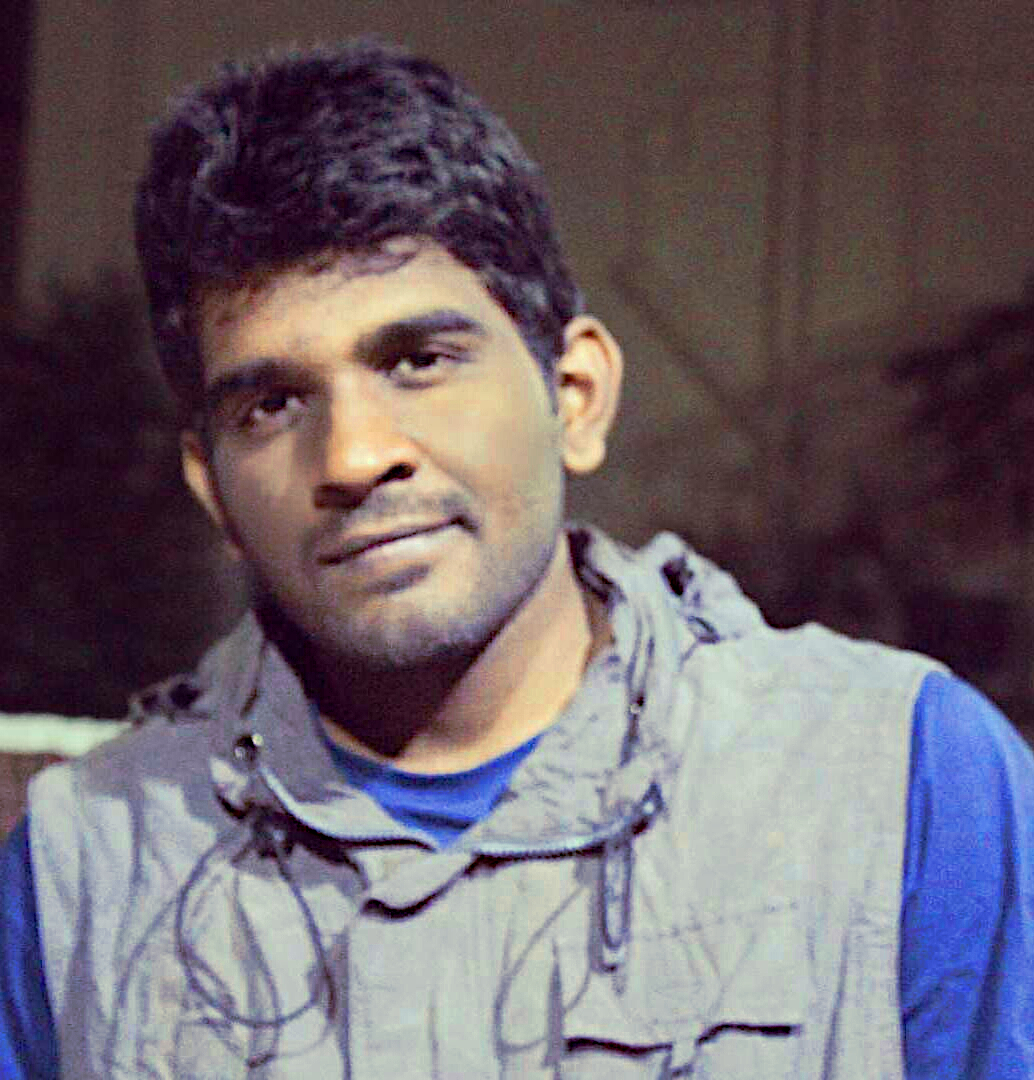
- Born: 24 May 1989 (age 37); Visakhapatnam, India

Krishnam Raju Gadiraju (born 24 May 1989) is an Indo-Canadian speedcuber and unicyclist. He is a six-time world record holder and the first Indian to ever set a world record in speedcubing and unicycling.

On 19 October 2014, Gadiraju solved 2,176 rubik's cubes with one hand in 24 hours and entered into the Guinness World Records. On 19 October 2016, Gadiraju achieved his second Guinness World Record title after he solved 170 rubik's cubes on a unicycle, beating the former record of 117 cubes held by Owen Farmer, USA. Gadiraju held the world record for the fastest time to solve the Soma cube. On 19 October 2017, with a time of 53.86 seconds, Gadiraju broke the world record for the fastest time to complete two Rubik's cubes simultaneously underwater. One year later, he solved a Gear Cube in a world record time of 3.79 seconds and a Rubik's Magic blindfolded in 2.99 seconds, also a world record.

He is a competitive chess player representing Karnataka at World Chess Federation competitions. He holds the title Arena Candidate Master. Gadiraju is also a memory athlete.

In February 2017, he was featured in the Limca Book of Records.

== Media appearances ==
- 19 Oct 2014 - The Hindu
- 20 Oct 2014 - The New Indian Express
- 21 Oct 2016 - The Hindu
- 19 Mar 2017 - Bangalore Mirror Indiatimes
- 13 Nov 2017 - Times of India
- 10 Jan 2018 - Coca-Cola
- 2 Sep 2018 - BBC News
- 6 Nov 2018 - The New Indian Express
- 19 Nov 2018 - Times Top10
