= Bhimavaram =

- Town
- Somarama Temple of Gunupudi, Bhimavaram
- Nicknames: Second Bardoli of India; Las Vegas of Andhra Pradesh
- Location in Andhra Pradesh, India Bhimavaram (India)
- Coordinates: 16.543°N 81.523°E
- Country: India
- State: Andhra Pradesh
- Region: Coastal Andhra
- District: West Godavari district
- Mandal: Bhimavaram mandal
- Founder: Chalukya Bhima I

Government
  - Type: Municipality
  - Body: Bhimavaram Municipality
  - MLA: Pulaparthi Ramanjaneyulu

Area
  - Town: 25.64 km^{2} (9.90 sq mi)
  - Rank: 20 (Andhra Pradesh)
- Elevation: 7 m (23 ft)

Population (2011)
  - Town: 142,184
  - Rank: 23
  - Density: 5,545/km^{2} (14,360/sq mi)
  - Metro: 163,875

Languages
  - Official: Telugu
- Time zone: UTC+5:30 (IST)
- PIN: 534 201,534 202,534 203
- Area code: 08816
- Vehicle registration: AP 37
- Website: bhimavaram.cdma.ap.gov.in

Bhimavaram is a town and headquarters of West Godavari district in the Indian state of Andhra Pradesh. It is the administrative headquarters of Bhimavaram mandal in Bhimavaram revenue division. It is a part of Bhimavaram Urban Development Authority. As of 2011 census, it is the most populous urban area in the district with a population of 163,875. It is one of the major pilgrimage centers in the state, which is home to Somaramam, one of the five great Pancharama Kshetras.

== History ==
Along with much of present-day coastal Andhra Pradesh, Bhimavaram was governed by the Chola dynasty. Under Kulothunga Chola I, Bhimavaram was administered by his sons who served as viceroys. Stone inscriptions have been found in the town dating from his reign (c. 1096 C.E.).

== Etymology ==
The name Bhimavaram literally means "the gift of Bhima". According to a legend, in around 890–918 AD, an Eastern Chalukya king named Chalukya Bheema built a Siva temple and laid the foundation to this town. It was originally called "Bhimapuram", but the name gradually changed to "Bhimavaram"; "puram" refers to a dwelling place while "varam" means an endowment in Telugu. An alternative explanation is, that the sound va (labiodental) is preferred to ba, pa (labials) in colloquial language and over a period of time tend to shift from pa to va. Hence "varam" from "puram".

== Demographics ==
As of 2011 census of India, the town had a population of 142,184. The total population constitutes 70,066 males and 72,214 females—a sex ratio of 1031 females per 1000 males. 12,157 children are in the age group of 0–6 years, of which 6,149 are boys and 6,008 are girls—a ratio of 977 girls per 1000 boys. The average literacy rate stands at 83.41% with 108,535 literates, significantly higher than the state average of 73.00%. Its urban agglomeration population was 146,961.

== Economy ==
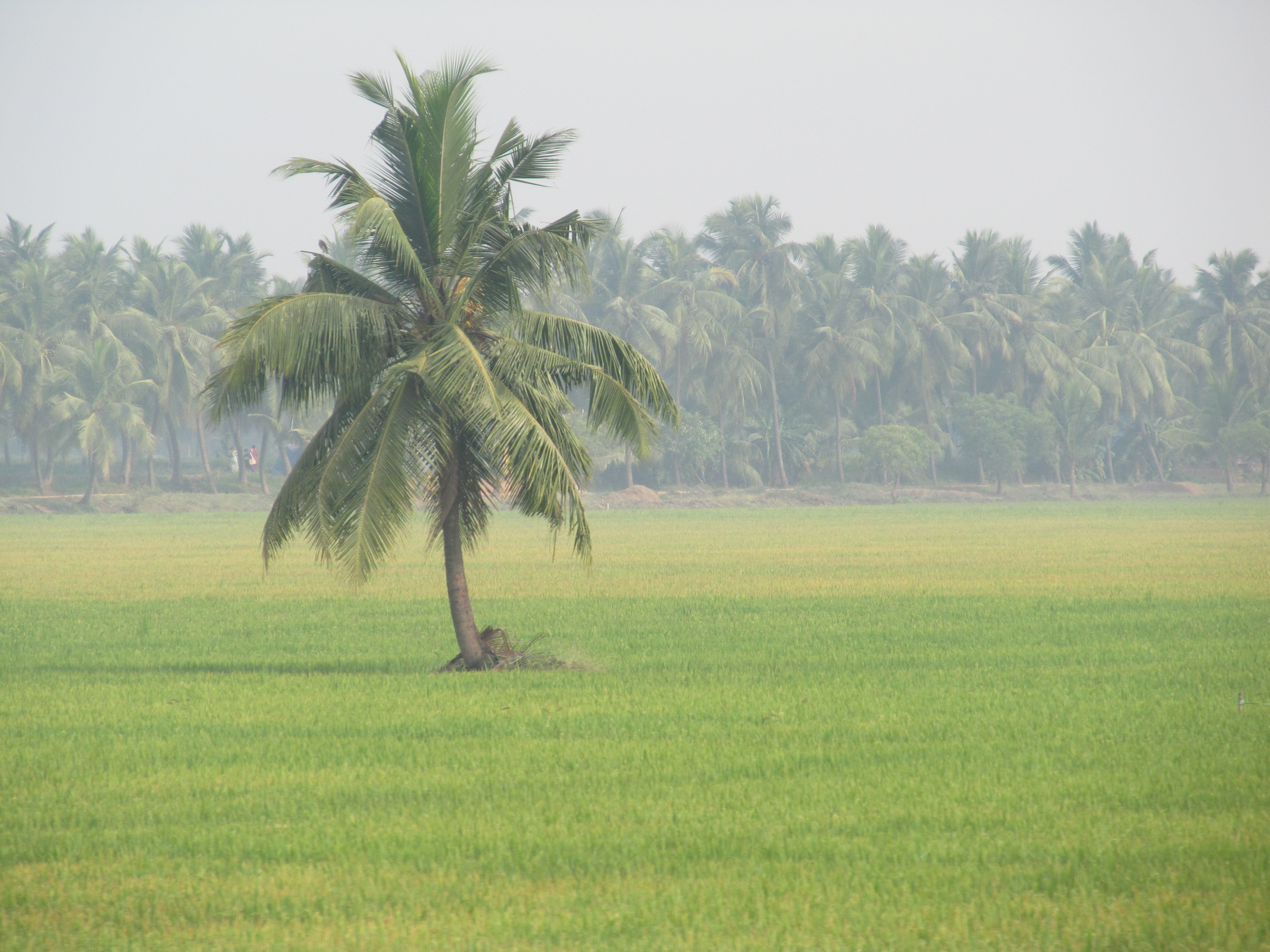
A patch of paddy fields near Bhimavaram

Bhimavaram is in the epicentre of the Godavari delta region. It is one of the principal trade centres of paddy in the state of Andhra Pradesh. Agriculture-based businesses like food processing, aqua culture, rice mills etc., are the chief sources of the town's revenue. It serves as a distribution centre as well as commercial centre to its hinterland. The town is the regional centre for higher education and is known for its specialized health services. It has many major retail brand shops.

== Governance ==
=== Civic administration ===
Its urban agglomeration covers Bhimavaram Municipality, partly out growths of Rayalam (rural) and Chinamiram. It has an area of 26.14 km^{2} (10.09 sq mi).

Trace of Bhimavaram Municipality Evolution:

1. April 1948: Bhimavaram Municipality was established as a third grade Municipal Corporation.
2. August 1963: Upgraded to a second grade municipality in August 1963.
3. August 1967: Upgraded to a first grade municipality in August 1967.
4. September 1980: Upgraded to a Special Grade Municipality in September 1980.
5. September 2011: It was upgraded to 'Selection Grade municipality' in 2011.
6. 1 January 2019: Eluru Urban Development Authority created. Bhimavaram became a part of EUDA along with places in West Godavari District.

=== Politics ===
Bhimavaram assembly constituency is a legislative assembly constituency in Narasapuram Lok Sabha constituency in Andhra Pradesh.

== Transport ==
The town has a total road length of 201.60 km (125.27 mi). It is well connected with other places in the country by national highways. NH 216 passes through the town.

The Andhra Pradesh State Road Transport Corporation operates bus services from Bhimavaram bus station. Bhimavaram Junction railway station is classified as 'NSG-4' in South Coast Railway zone. The Gudivada–Bhimavaram section connects it with Howrah-Chennai main line.

Bhimavaram Town railway station is well-connected with daily trains to major cities like Vijayawada, Visakhapatnam, Tirupathi, Bengaluru, Chennai, Nellore, Hyderabad. Almost all the trains passing through the Junction pass through the town station and vice versa.

There are as many as 2,69,137 vehicle owners are licensed according to transport officials in the town. Out of this, about 13,064 are autos, 1236 school buses, 9908 lorries, 11,129 cars, 2,04,728 motorbikes, 2,833 three-wheelers, 15 car travels, and 5 bus travel vehicles.

The nearest airport to Bhimavaram is Rajahmundry Airport, which is 80 km away. Bhimavaram is located at distance of 120 km from Vijayawada, 265 km from Visakhapatnam and 400 km from Hyderabad.

== Culture ==
Bhimavaram is famous for:

- the Gunupudi Someswara (Somarama) temple, which is one of the five holy Pancharamas and
- the temple of the local deity Mavullamma. The Shiva lingam is known for changing its color according to the lunar month: Black during amavasya and white during pournami. Mavullamma is believed to have manifested herself here in the year 1200 CE with the temple being built around 1880 CE. According to local folklore the goddess' idol appeared inside a mango farm earning her the name Mamillamma (arising from mangoes) which was later modified to Mavullamma.

== Notable people ==
Many people from the city have become notable in the Telugu cinema industry such as:

- Trivikram Srinivas,
- Sivaji Raja,
- Penmatsa Subbaraju,
- Sunil (Indukuri Sunil Varma),
- Uppalapati Venkata Suryanarayana Prabhas Raju (Prabhas) and
- Raja Ravindra.

Other notable personalities include:

- Krishnam Raju Gadiraju,
- Yellapragada Subbarao

in science,

- mystic Swami Jnanananda,
- Industrialists:
  - B. V. Raju,
  - Byrraju Ramalinga Raju and
- freedom fighter Alluri Sitarama Raju

== Education ==
Primary and secondary school education is imparted by government, aided, and private schools of the School Education Department of the state. The mediums of instruction followed by schools are English and Telugu.

There are numerous higher educational institutions in and around Bhimavaram. Some of the renowned institutions are:

- Sagi Ramakrishnam Raju Engineering College (S. R. K. R. Engineering College),
- Bhimavaram Institute of Engineering & Technology,
- Dantuluri Narayana Raju College (D. N. R. Educational Institutions),
- Grandhi Varalakshmi Venkatarao Institute of Technology (GVIT),
- K. G. R. L. Group of Educational Institutions,
- Sri Vishnu Educational Society,
- Vishnu Dental College,

=== Other schools ===
- Sarada Residential School

== Sports ==
=== Badminton Indoor Stadiums & Academies ===
List of Badminton Indoor Stadiums in Bhimavaram Mandal.

==== Indoor Stadiums at Colleges & Clubs ====
Clubs

- Townhall Badminton Indoor Stadium (1 Court)
- The Cosmopolitan Club Badminton Indoor Stadium (3 Courts)
- Youth Club Badminton Indoor Stadium (3 Courts)

Colleges

- DNR Badminton Indoor Stadium (4 Courts)
- SRKR Indoor Stadium (2 Courts)
- Sri Vishnu Educational Society (5 Courts & 2 Courts for Girls)

==== Badminton Stadium & Academy ====
- PRO Badminton Academy (5 Courts)
- Venkat Badminton Academy (4 Courts)
- Smash Badminton Academy (3 Courts)

== See also ==
- List of cities in Andhra Pradesh
- List of municipalities in Andhra Pradesh
- Kolleru Lake
- Kolleru Bird Sanctuary
