= Bhimavaram–Narasapur branch line =

Railway route in India

- Palakollu is an important railway station of Bhimavaram–Narasapur branch line

Overview
- Status: Operational
- Owner: Indian Railways
- Locale: Andhra Pradesh
- Termini: Bhimavaram Junction; Narasapur

Service
- Operator: South Coast Railway

Technical
- Track gauge: 5 ft 6 in (1,676 mm) broad gauge
- Electrification: Yes
- Operating speed: 110 km/h (68 mph)

The Bhimavaram–Narasapur branch line is a railway junction connecting Bhimavaram Junction and Narasapur railway stations in the Indian state of Andhra Pradesh. It is under the administrative jurisdiction of South Coast Railway zone.
