= Bhimavaram Junction railway station =

Railway Station in Andhra Pradesh

Bhimavaram Junction

General information
- Location: Bhimavaram; West Godavari district Andhra Pradesh; India
- Coordinates: 16.5442°N 81.5375°E
- System: Indian Railways station
- Owner: Indian Railways
- Operator: Vijayawada railway division
- Lines: Vijayawada–Narsapur
- Platforms: 5
- Tracks: double

Construction
- Structure type: Standard (on-ground station)
- Parking: Available

Other information
- Status: Active
- Station code: BVRM
- Fare zone: South Coast Railway zone

History
- Opened: 17 September 1928; 97 years ago
Location
- Location within Andhra Pradesh Location within India
- Interactive map

Bhimavaram Junction railway station is a station located in Bhimavaram, West Godavari district, Andhra Pradesh.

== History ==
The then meter gauge line was upgraded to broad gauge in 1961. GDV-BVRM Broad gauge railway opened by Jagjivan Ram Railway Minister on 8 October 1961.

== Classification ==
In terms of earnings and outward passengers handled, Bhimavaram Junction is categorized as a Non-Suburban Grade-4 (NSG-4) railway station. Based on the re–categorization of Indian Railway stations for the period of 2017–18 and 2022–23, an NSG–4 category station earns between ₹10–₹20 crore and handles 2–5 million passengers.

== Station amenities ==
It is one of the 38 stations in the division to be equipped with Automatic Ticket Vending Machines (ATVMs).

== See also ==
- Bhimavaram town railway station

Preceding station	Indian Railways	Following station
pennada Agraharam towards ?	South Central Railway zone Nidadavolu–Bhimavaram–Narsapur–Vijayawada branch line	Bhimavaram Town towards ?
