= Bhimavaram Town Halt railway station =

Railway station in Andhra Pradesh, India

Bhimavaram Town Railway Station

General information
- Location: Bhimavaram, West Godavari district, Andhra Pradesh; India
- Coordinates: 16.5472761°N 81.5191696°E
- System: Railway station
- Line: Vijayawada–Nidadavolu loop line
- Tracks: 2 5 ft 6 in (1,676 mm) broad gauge

Construction
- Structure type: Standard (on ground)

Other information
- Status: Active
- Station code: BVRT
- Zone(s): SCoR
- Division(s): Vijayawada
- Classification: NSG-3

History
- Opened: 1899

Services
Preceding station	Indian Railways	Following station
Undi towards ?	Vijayawada–Nidadavolu loop line	Vendra towards ?
Undi towards ?	Bhimavaram–Narasapur branch line	Bhimavaram Junction towards ?
Route map
Location
- Location within Andhra Pradesh Location within India
- Interactive map

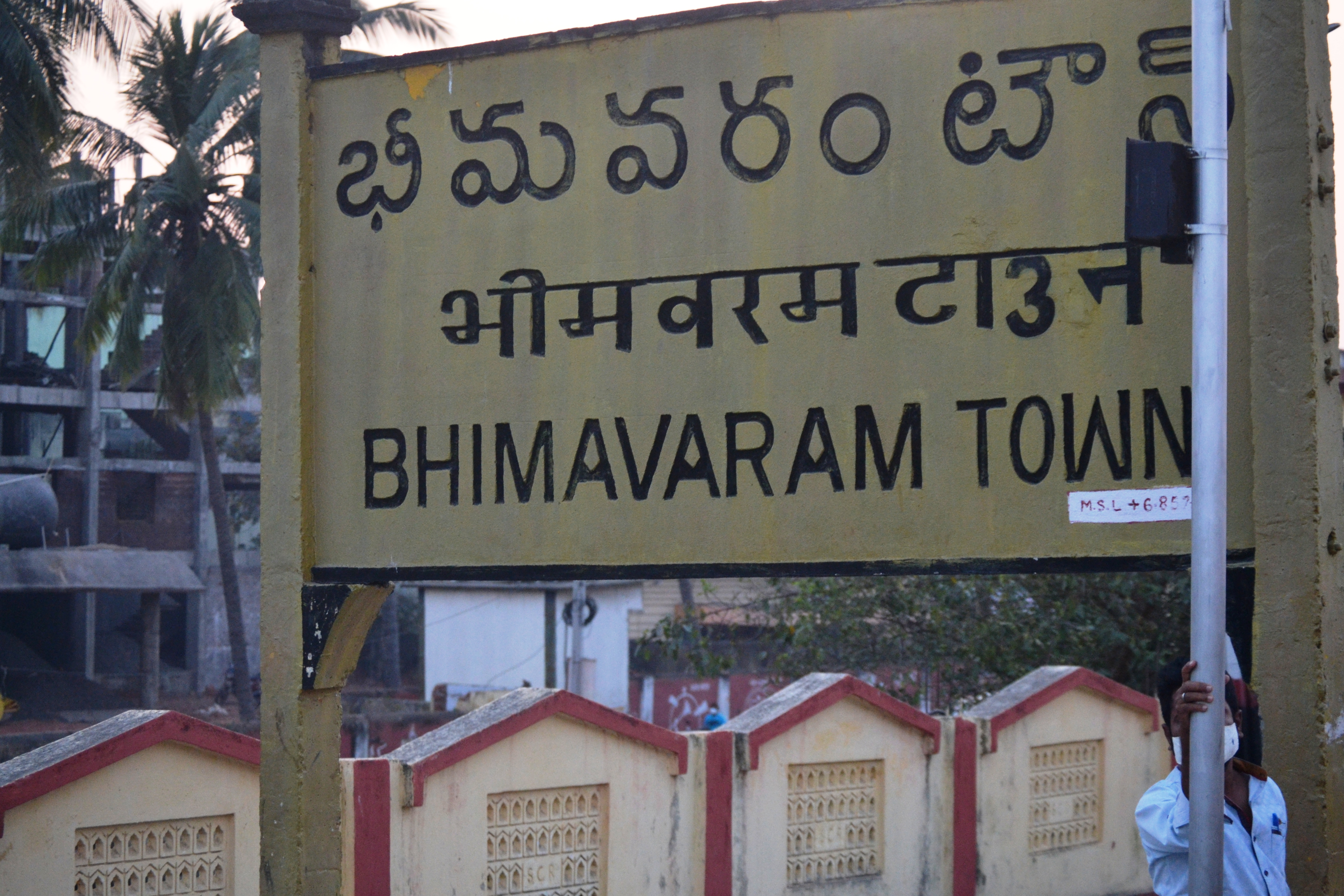
Railway station name board of Bhimavaram Town station in Andhra Pradesh

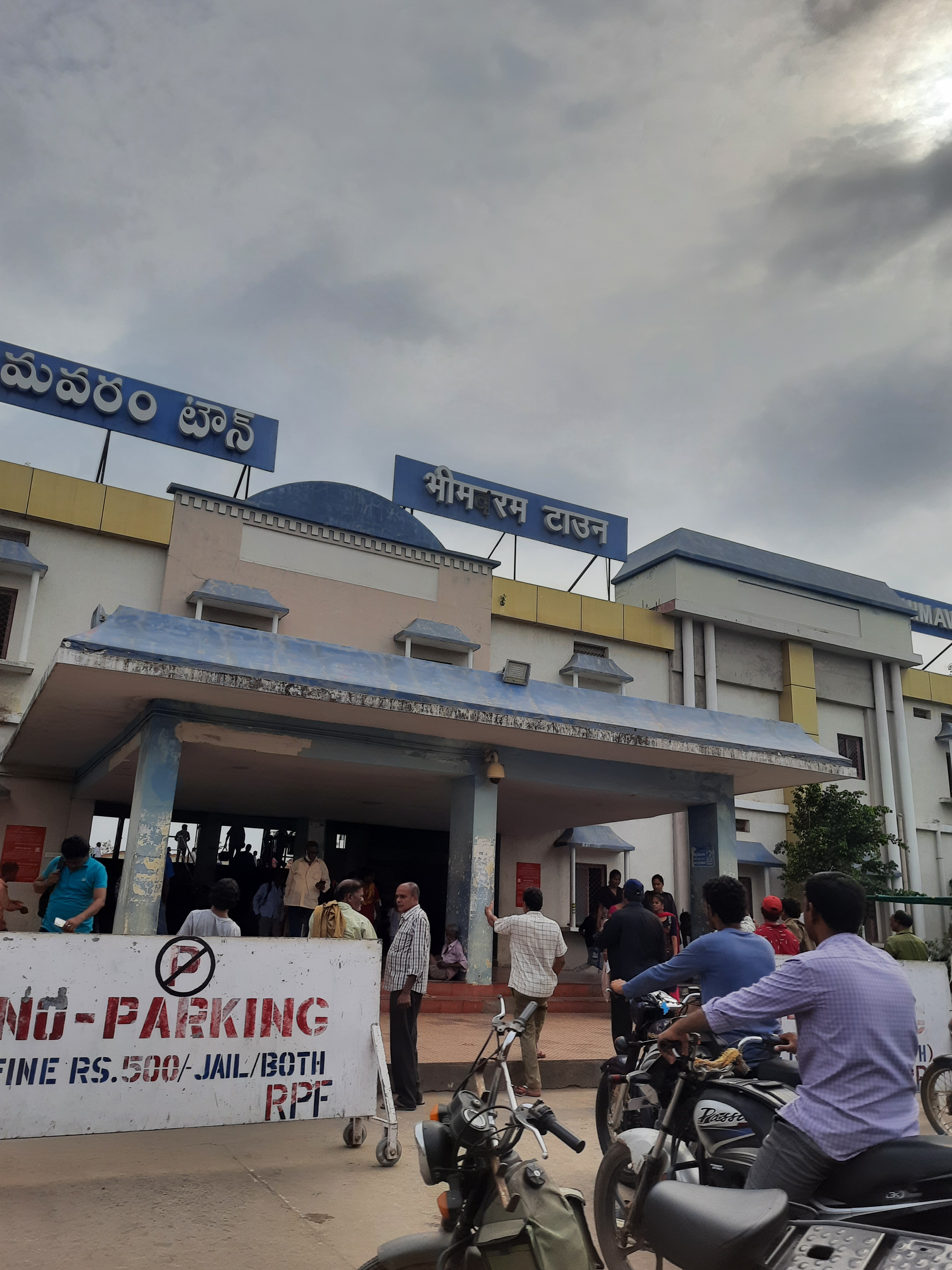
Bhimavaram town railway station

Bhimavaram Town Railway Station (station code:BVRT) is an Indian Railways station in Bhimavaram of Andhra Pradesh. It is administered under Vijayawada railway division of South Coast Railway zone.

== History ==
GDV–BVRM Broad gauge railway opened by Jagjivan Ram Railway Minister on 8 October 1961. First express train passing through BVRT is Narsapur express (17255/17256) introduced in year 1-10-1979, first AC train was Cocanada SF Express (12775/12776) cct-sec and non-AC Superfast train was vskp-ltt SF Express (12749/12750) runs on Wednesday and Saturday at present it was converted into ordinary vskp-ltt (18519/18520) Express daily

Bhimavaram Town is an NSG-3 category station in the Vijayawada – Bhimavaram Junction section with an average footfall of 7587 passengers per day and annual earnings of 33.20 crores. All express & passenger trains are having a stoppage at this station.

Bhimavaram Town railway station is in West Godavari district, Andhra Pradesh. It is one of the principal trade centers of paddy in the state of Andhra Pradesh. Agriculture-based businesses like food processing, aquaculture, rice mills, etc., are the chief sources of the town's revenue. Bhimavaram is famous for the Gunupudi Someswara (Somarama) temple, which is one of the five holy Pancharamas and the temple of the local deity Mavullamma. The Shiva lingam is known for changing its color according to the lunar month: Black during Amavasya (No moon day) and white during Pournami (full moon day).

== Classification ==
It falls under NSG-3 railway station category.

== Daily connectivity ==
Bhimavaram town station is very well connected to Major cities, with the below availability of trains

City	frequency
Hyderabad	4 Express trains daily
Vishakapatnam	5 Express trains daily
Mumbai	1 Express train daily
Bangalore	1 Express train daily
Tirupati	3 Express trains daily
Chennai	4 Express train daily
Shirdi(Nagarsol)	1 Express train week 5 days via KZJ
Shirdi(Nagarsol)	1 Express train weekly twice via GNT

== Time-table ==
Train name (no.) passing via Bhimavaram Town	Arrives	Departs	Sunday	Monday	Tuesday	Wednesday	Thursday	Friday	Saturday
Vskp Ltt Express (18519)	03:59	04:00	Y	Y	Y	Y	Y	Y	Y
Ltt Vskp Express (18520)	04:53	04:55	Y	Y	Y	Y	Y	Y	Y
Narsapur Lingampalli Express (17255)	19:38	19:40	Y	Y	Y	Y	Y	Y	Y
Lingampalli Narasapur Express (17256)	6:08	6:10	Y	Y	Y	Y	Y	Y	Y
Cocanada Express (12775)	22:28	22:30	Y	Y	Y	Y	Y	Y	Y
Cocanada Express (12776)	4:17	4:18	Y	Y	Y	Y	Y	Y	Y
Ns Nsl Express (17231)	11:58	12:00	Y	N	N	N	N	Y	N
Nsl Ns Express (17232)	08:28	08:30	N	Y	N	N	N	N	Y
Ns Nsl Express (12787)	11:58	12:00	N	Y	Y	Y	Y	N	Y
Nsl Ns Express (12788)	7:24	7:25	Y	N	Y	Y	Y	Y	N
Seshadri Express (17209)	2:23	2:25	Y	Y	Y	Y	Y	Y	Y
Seshadri Express (17210)	19:59	20:00	Y	Y	Y	Y	Y	Y	Y
Circar Express (17643)	4:18	4:20	Y	N	Y	Y	N	Y	N
Circar Express (17644)	17:23	17:25	Y	N	Y	Y	N	Y	N
Circar Express (17655)	17:15	17:20	N	Y	N	N	Y	N	Y
Circar Express (17656)	4:18	4:20	N	Y	N	N	Y	N	Y
Mtm Vskp Express (17219)	23:28	23:30	Y	Y	Y	Y	Y	Y	Y
Vskp Mtm Express (17220)	05:08	05:10	Y	Y	Y	Y	Y	Y	Y
Puri Tpty Express (17479)	9:18	9:20	N	Y	Y	N	Y	Y	Y
Tpty Puri Express (17480)	20:18	20:20	N	Y	Y	Y	N	Y	Y
Bsp Tpty Express (17481)	9:18	9:20	Y	N	N	Y	N	N	N
Tpty Bilaspur Express (17482)	21:29	21:30	Y	N	N	N	Y	N	N
Visakha Express (17015)	21:13	21:15	Y	Y	Y	Y	Y	Y	Y
Visakha Express (17016)	12:54	12:55	Y	Y	Y	Y	Y	Y	Y
Narasapur Chennai Central Vande Bharat Express (20678)	15:18	15:20	Y	Y	N	Y	Y	Y	Y
Chennai Central Narasapur Vande Bharat Express (20677)	13:15	13:17	Y	Y	N	Y	Y	Y	Y
Tatanagar Ernakulam Express (18189)	12:38	12:40	Y	Y	Y	Y	Y	Y	Y
Ernakulam Tatanagar Express (18190)	05:28	05:30	Y	Y	Y	Y	Y	Y	Y
NS DMM Express (17247)	18:33	18:55	Y	Y	Y	Y	Y	Y	Y
DMM NS Express (17248)	03:43	03:45	Y	Y	Y	Y	Y	Y	Y
Narasapur Hubballi Jn Express (17225)	16:58	17:00	Y	Y	Y	Y	Y	Y	Y
Hubballi Jn Narasapur Express (17226)	05:53	05:55	Y	Y	Y	Y	Y	Y	Y
Guntur Narasapur Express (17281)	21:18	21:20	Y	Y	Y	Y	Y	Y	Y
Narasapur Guntur Express (17282)	07:03	07:05	Y	Y	Y	Y	Y	Y	Y
