= Chittoor (disambiguation) =

Chittoor may refer to:

- Chittoor, Andhra Pradesh, a city in and district headquarters of Chittoor district, Andhra Pradesh, India
  - Chittoor district, a district in Rayalaseema region, Andhra Pradesh, India
  - Chittoor mandal, Andhra Pradesh, a mandal in Chittoor district, Andhra Pradesh, India
  - Chittoor Urban mandal
  - Chittoor Rural mandal
  - Chittoor revenue division, Andhra Pradesh, a revenue division in Chittoor district, Andhra Pradesh, India
- Chittorgarh, a city and district headquarters of Chittorgarh district, Rajasthan, India
  - Chittorgarh district, a district in Rajasthan, India
- Chittur, a town in Palakkad district of Kerala, India
- Chittoor, a town near Kochi in Ernakulam district of Kerala, India

== Transport ==
- Chittoor Road, a major arterial road in the city of Kochi, India
