= Chittoor revenue division =

Revenue division in Andhra Pradesh, India

- revenue division in Chittoor district
- Chittoor revenue division in Chittoor district
- Country: India
- State: Andhra Pradesh
- District: Chittoor
- Headquarters: Chittoor
- Time zone: UTC+05:30 (IST)

Chittoor revenue division is an administrative division in the Chittoor district of the Indian state of Andhra Pradesh. It is one of the 4 revenue divisions in the district with 14 mandals under its administration and its headquarters at Chittoor. The division has 1 municipal corporation.

== Administration ==
The details of the mandals and urban settlements in the division are:

No.	Mandals
1	Bangarupalyam mandal
2	Chittoor Urban mandal
3	Chittoor Rural mandal
4	Gudipala mandal
5	Yadamarri mandal
6	Gangadharanellore mandal
7	Puthalapattu mandal
8	Penumur mandal
9	Thavanampalle mandal
10	Irala mandal
11	Pulicherla mandal
12	Rompicherla mandal
13	Srirangarajapuram mandal
14	Vedurukuppam mandal

== History ==
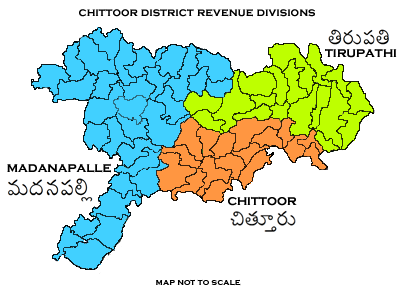
Chittor District Revenue Divisions before April 2022

== See also ==
- List of revenue divisions in Andhra Pradesh
- List of mandals in Andhra Pradesh
- Chittoor district
- Kuppam Revenue Division
- Palamaner Revenue Division
- Nagari Revenue Division
