= Therani =

- Village
- Interactive map of Therani
- Location in Andhra Pradesh, India Therani (India)
- Coordinates: 13.311667°N 79.555833°E
- Country: India
- State: Andhra Pradesh
- District: Chittoor district
- Talukas: Nagari

Languages
  - Official: Telugu
- Time zone: UTC+5:30 (IST)
- PIN: AP-517592
- Nearest city: Tirupati, Chennai
- Lok Sabha constituency: Chittoor - (Reserved for SC)
- Vidhan Sabha constituency: Nagari

Therani is a village in Chittoor district in the state of Andhra Pradesh in India. It has a 500-year-old Vaikuntanatha temple to Vishnu.

== See also ==
- Vaikuntanatha Temple, Therani

== Gallery ==
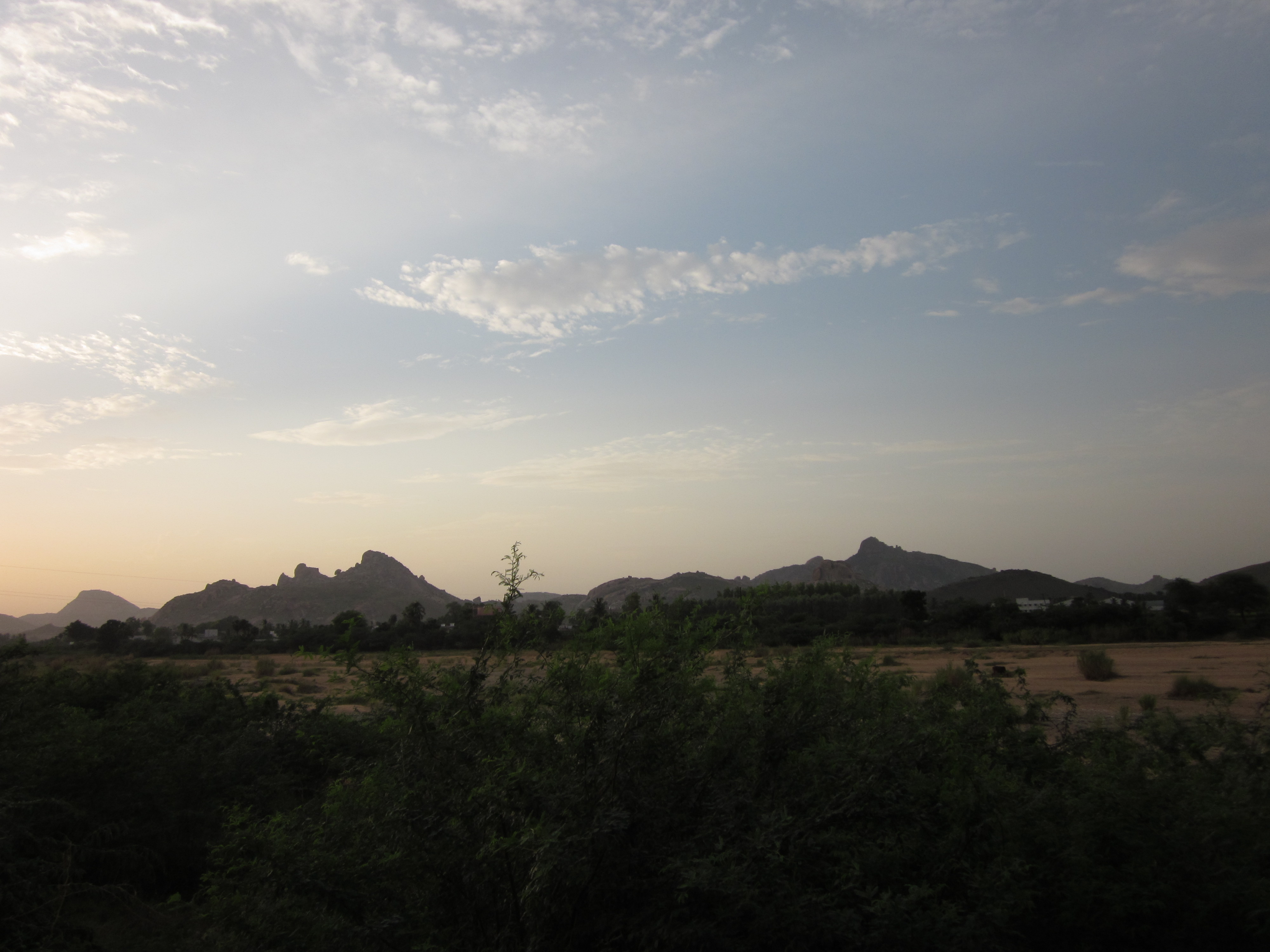

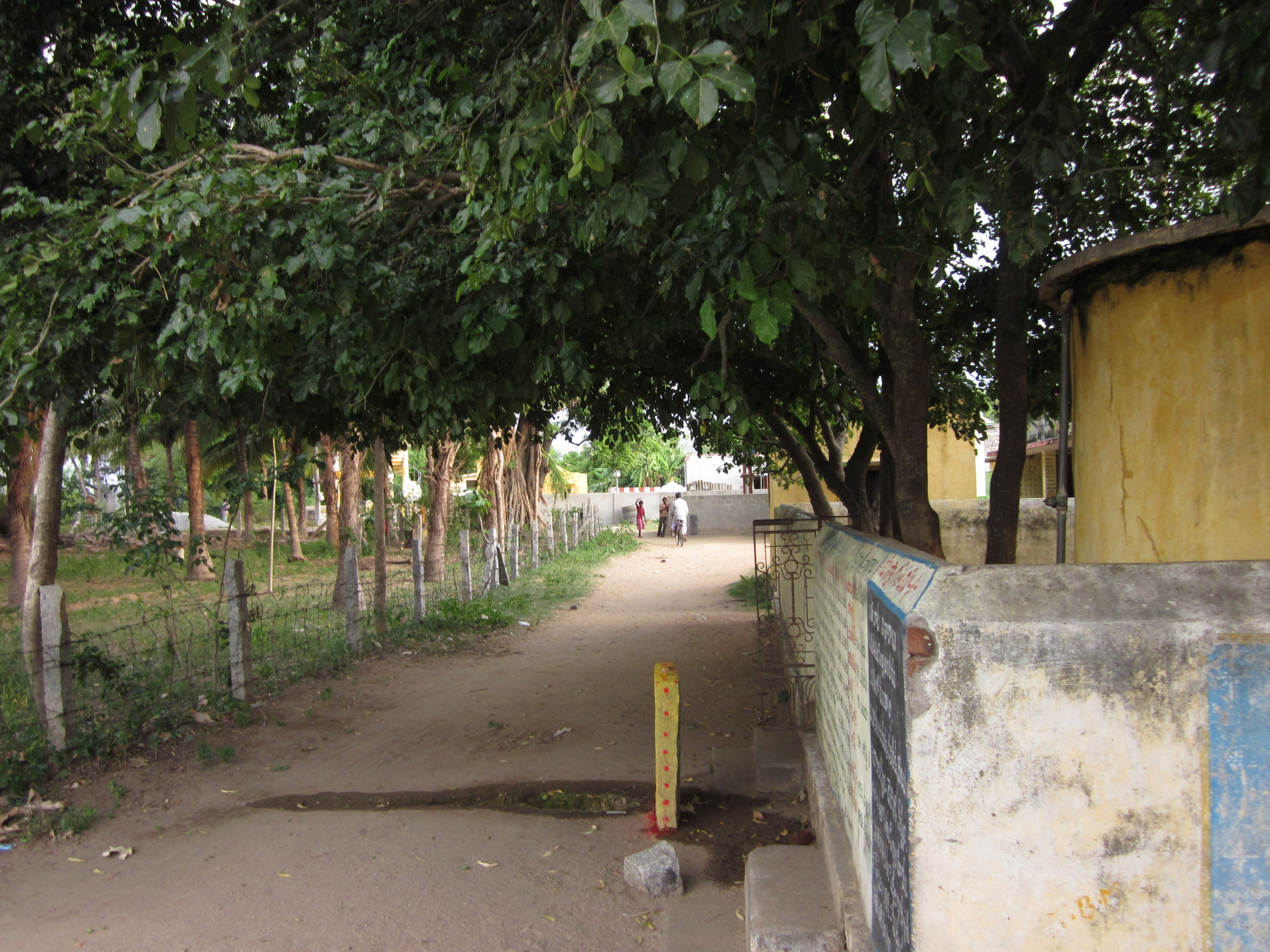

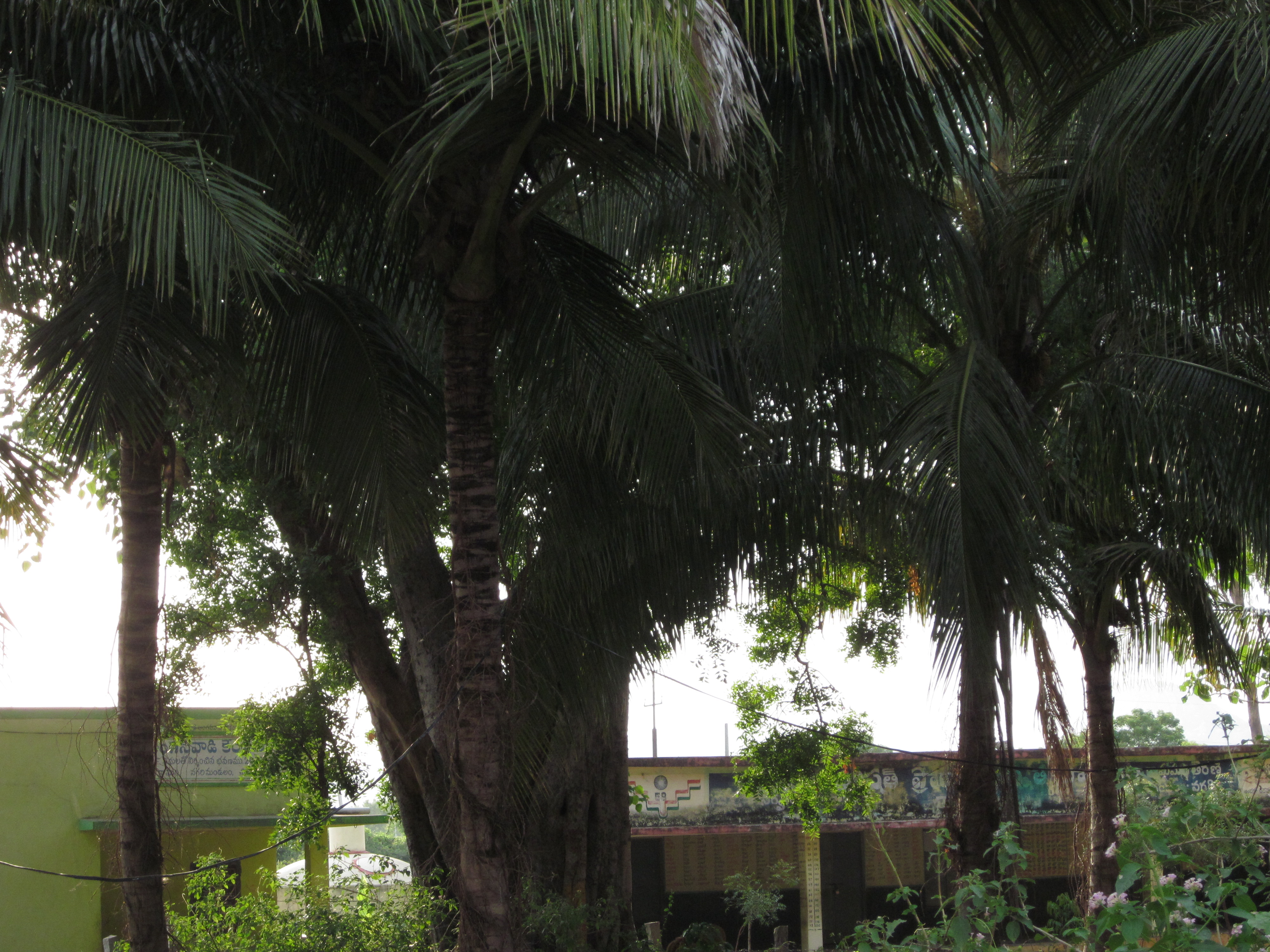

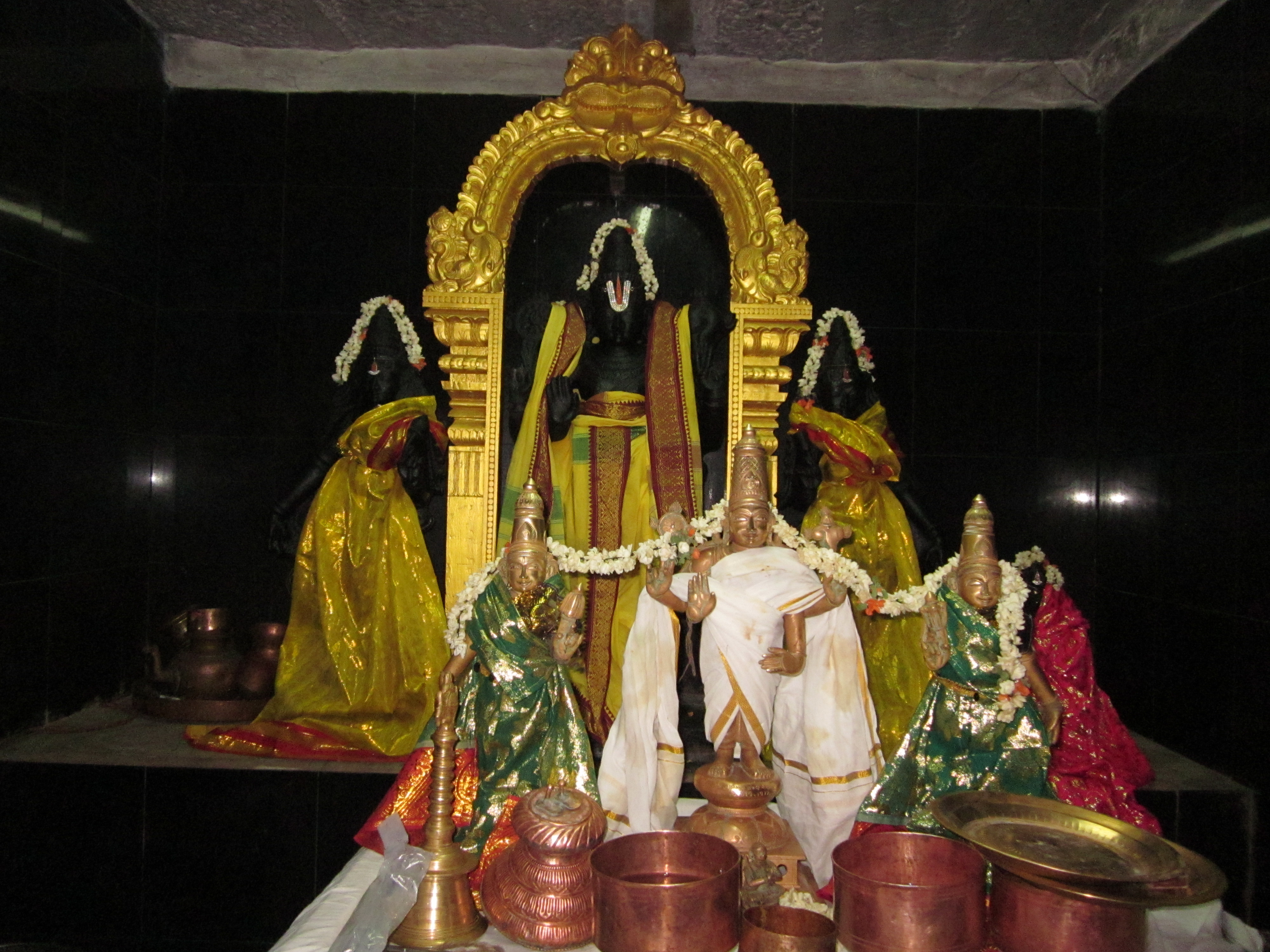
Vaikuntanatha Swamy Temple inner sanctum
