= Muthuvalloor =

- Village
- Country: India
- State: Andhra Pradesh
- District: Chittoor

Government
  - Type: Andhra Pradesh Government

Population (2011)
  - Total: 250 people

Languages
  - Official: Telugu
- Time zone: UTC+5:30 (IST)
- Postal code: 517132
- Vehicle registration: AP03 -- Chittoor town

Muthuvalloor is a village in Gudipala mandal in Chittoor district in the state of Andhra Pradesh, India.
