= Chittoor mandal =

- Former mandal of Andhra Pradesh
- 2023
- Capital: Chittoor
- Population
  - 2011 Census: 212,816
Succeeded by
Chittoor Urban mandal; Chittoor Rural mandal

Chittoor mandal is a former mandal in Chittoor district of the state of Andhra Pradesh in India. Its headquarters was located at Chittoor. The mandal was bounded by Yadamari, Gudipala, Thavanampalle, Puthalapattu, Penumuru, Gangadhara Nellore mandals. Chittoor mandal on 8 May 2023 was divided to form Chittoor Urban mandal and Chittoor Rural mandal.

== Demographics ==
As of 2011 census, the mandal had a population of 212,816. The total population constitute, 106,211 males and 106,605 females —a sex ratio of 996 females per 1000 males. 20,533 children are in the age group of 0–6 years, of which 10,781 are boys and 9,752 are girls —a ratio of 905 per 1000. The average literacy rate stands at 83.02% with 159,641 literates.

== Towns and villages ==
Mangasamudram (Rural) is the most populated settlement and Krishnapuram is the least populated settlement in the mandal. As of 2011 census, the mandal has 31 settlements, that includes:

1. Alukurupalle [R]
2. Anagallu [R]
3. Ananthapuram [R]
4. Anupalle [U]
5. Anupalle (Part) [U]
6. Arathala [R]
7. Ayanavedu [R]
8. Bakara Narasinga Rayani Pet [R]
9. 194 Bandapalle (The City) [R]
10. Chinthalagunta [R]
11. Chittoor [U]
12. Diguvamasapalle [R]
13. Doddipalle [U]
14. Gandlapalle [U]
15. Greamspet [U]
16. Gollapalle [R]
17. Guvvakallu [R]
18. Iruvaram [U]
19. Kattamanchi [U]
20. Krishnapuram [R]
21. Kurchivedu [R]
22. Lakshmambapuram [U]
23. Mangasamudram [U]
24. Mapakshi [U]
25. Mapakshi (Part) [U]
26. Murakambattu [U]
27. Muthukur [R]
28. Narigapalle [U]
29. Paschanapalle [R]
30. Palooru [R]
31. Peddisettipalle [R]
32. Perumallakandiga [R]
33. S.Venkatapuram
34. Settiappanthangal [R]
35. Siddampalle [R]
36. Thalambedu [R]
37. Thenebanda [R]
38. Thumminda [R]
39. Thimmasamudram [U]
40. Varadarajulapalle [R]
41. 5 Venkatapuram [R]
42. 33 Venkatapuram [R]

== See also ==
- Chittoor district
