= Errepalli =

P. Errepalli
- village
- Interactive map of P. Errepalli
- Location in Andhra Pradesh, India
- Coordinates: 13°21′38″N 79°01′34″E
- Country: India
- State: Andhra Pradesh
- District: Chittoor

Population (2013)
  - Total: 1,000

Languages
  - Official: Telugu
- Time zone: UTC+5:30 (IST)
- PIN: 517130
- Telephone code: 08573
- Vehicle registration: AP03
- Nearest city: Tirupati (city)
- Sex ratio: 1:1 ♂/♀
- Lok Sabha constituency: Chittoor
- Vidhan Sabha constituency: Puthalapattu

P. Errepalli is a village which is located in the district of Chittoor and Irala mandal in Andhra Pradesh, India.
