= Kasavanoor =

- village
- Country: India
- State: Andhra Pradesh
- District: Chittoor district

Languages
  - Official: Telugu
- Time zone: UTC+5:30 (IST)
- PIN: 517569
- Telephone code: 918577
- Vehicle registration: AP

Kasavanoor is a village in Vedurukuppam mandal, located in Chittoor district of Andhra Pradesh, India.
