= Nallavengana Palli =

- Village
- Country: India
- State: Andhra Pradesh
- District: Chittoor

Languages
  - Official: Telugu
- Time zone: UTC+5:30 (IST)
- Postal code: 517569
- Vehicle registration: AP

Nallavengana Palli is a village in Vedurukuppam mandal, located in Chittoor district of Andhra Pradesh, India.
