= Srirangarajapuram =

- Village
- Interactive map of Srirangarajapuram
- Location in Andhra Pradesh, India
- Coordinates: 13°17′09″N 79°20′57″E
- Country: India
- State: Andhra Pradesh
- District: Chittoor
- Mandal: Srirangarajapuram

Population (2011)
  - Total: 2,335

Languages
  - Official: Telugu
- Time zone: UTC+5:30 (IST)
- PIN: 517167
- Telephone code: +91-8577
- Vehicle registration: AP

Srirangarajapuram is a village in Chittoor district of the Indian state of Andhra Pradesh. It is the mandal headquarters of Srirangarajapuram mandal.

== Politics ==
Assembly constituency

'Puttur' was an assembly constituency till 2008. After De-limitation, Puttur constituency was dissolved and merged with Nagari, Andhra Pradesh. Srirangarajapuram mandal is separated and merged with Gangadhara nellore. The current representative from 2013 election is - Narayana Swamy (YSR Congress Party) .

Lok Sabha constituency

'Tirupati' was Lok Sabha constituency till 2008. After de-limitation, constituency was dissolved and Srirangarajapuram Mandal was merged with Chittoor (Lok Sabha constituency) current representative from 2009 election is Naramalli Sivaprasad from Telugu Desam Party.
