= Bandivandluru =

- Village
- Interactive map of Bandivandluru
- Location in Andhra Pradesh, India Bandivandluru (India)
- Coordinates: 13.1595°N 79.0699°E
- Country: India
- State: Andhra Pradesh
- District: Chittoor
- Talukas: Yadamari

Population
  - Total: Approximately 600

Languages
  - Official: Telugu
- Time zone: UTC+5:30 (IST)
- PIN: 517128
- Telephone code: 08572

Bandivandluru is a village in Yadamari Mandal in Chittoor district in the state of Andhra Pradesh in India.

== Geography ==
Bandivandluru is a village in Yadamari mandal, Chittoor district, Andhra Pradesh in India. This village has an elementary school and access to many high schools and colleges. Telugu is the spoken language in the village. The village is very close to the towns of Chittoor, Vellore and Tirupati. The village is reachable from Chittoor town which is in between Chennai and Bengaluru. Bandivandluru is a small village and has hundred families. Bandivandluru is an agrarian village.
