= Neellakunta =

- Village
- Country: India
- State: Andhra Pradesh
- District: Chittoor
- Mandal: Palamaner

Languages
  - Official: Telugu
- Time zone: UTC+5:30 (IST)

Neellakunta is a village near Palamaner, India. It is located within the Palamaner Mandal.
