= Kunama Raju Palem =

- Village
- Interactive map of Kunama Raju Palem
- Location in India Kunama Raju Palem (India)
- Coordinates: 13.2256°N 79.4224°E
- Country: India
- State: Andhra Pradesh
- District: Rangareddy

Languages
- Time zone: UTC+5:30 (IST)

Kunama Raju Palem is a village in the Chittoor district of Andhra Pradesh, India. As per the constitution of India and Panchyati Raaj Act, Kunama Raju Palem village is administrated by Sarpanch, or Head of Village, who is an elected representative of the village. It is around 10 kilometers away from Nagari, the closet city. The population of the village is approximately 1366 as of 2011, consisting of 667 males and 699. females. 10% of the village population are children, and anywhere from 60-75% of the people are literate. With the village there is a sub-community called Malada, which largely consists of the scheduled castes.
