= Govindareddipalle =

Govindareddypalle
- Village
- Interactive map of Govindareddypalle
- Location in Andhra Pradesh, India
- Coordinates: 13°18′42.5″N 78°55′57.2″E
- Country: India
- State: Andhra Pradesh
- District: Chittoor
- Mandal: Thavanampalle
- Elevation: 17 m (56 ft)

Population (2011)
  - Total: 677 approximately

Languages
  - Official: Telugu
- Time zone: UTC+5:30 (IST)
- PIN: 517129
- Vehicle registration: AP 03

Racha Banda Govindareddypalle

Govindareddypalle is a village and grama Panchayath in Thavanampalle Mandal of Chittoor District of the state Andhra Pradesh. It is located 26 km from district headquarters Chittoor. Mango is the major crop growing here and stands first in cow milk production in the Thavanampalle Mandal.

River Bahuda flows towards the village in south. Chakalivani Konda the hill is situated towards north to the village. It is of 400 acres which is not a reserved forest. YSR Reservoir a small lake was dug by villagers in the year 2020 to store water. Rain water is the only source for this reservoir.

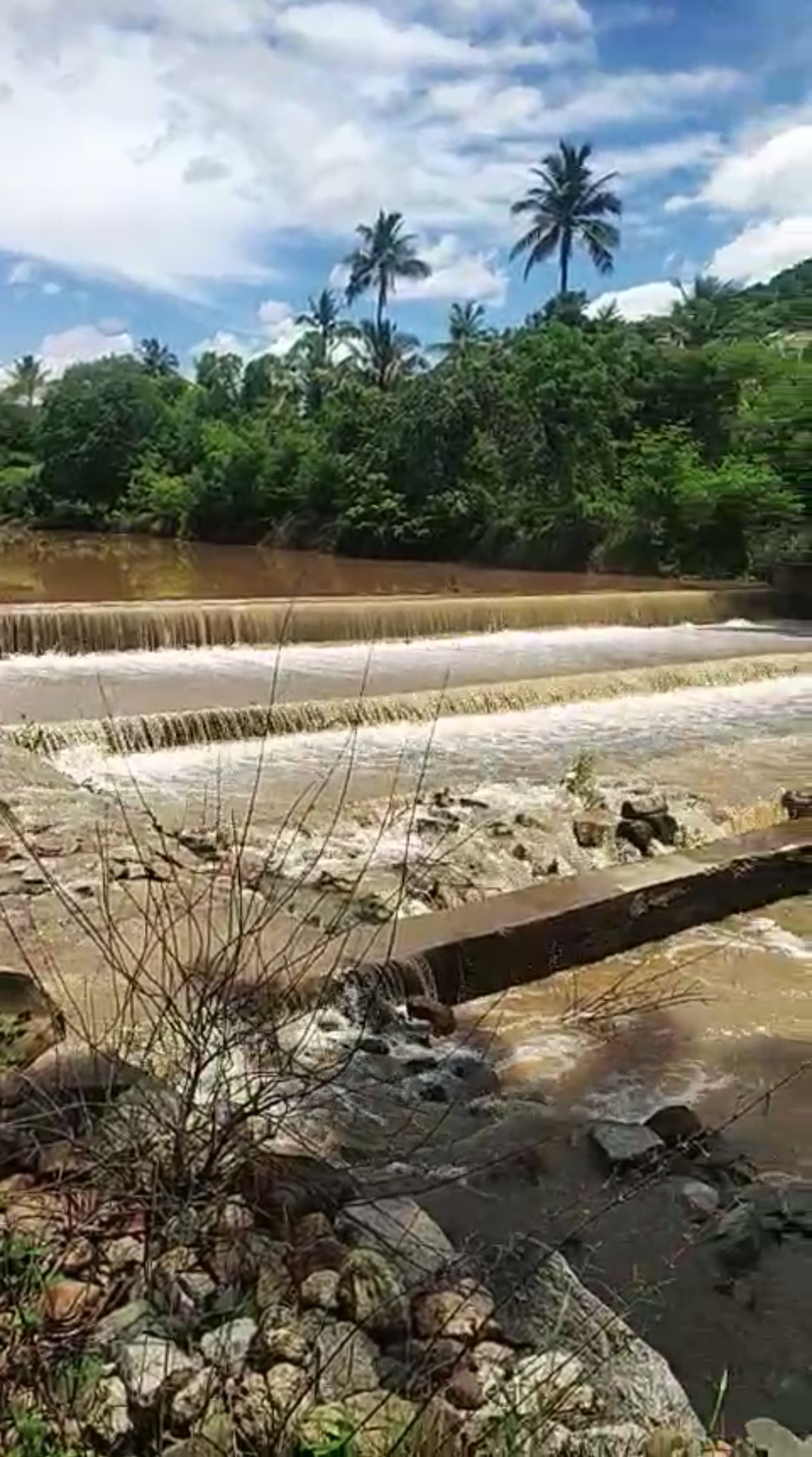
Bahuda River Govindareddypalle

YSR RESERVOIR GOVINDAREDDYPALLE
