= Talari (surname) =

Talari (Telugu: తలారి) is a Telugu surname. Notable people with the surname include:

- Talari Manohar (born 1954), Indian politician
- Talari Rangaiah (born 1970), Indian politician
- Talari Venkat Rao (born 1968), Indian politician
