= Kaliambakam =

Kaliyambakam
- Village
- Interactive map of Kaliyambakam
- Location in Andhra Pradesh, India Kaliyambakam (India)
- Coordinates: 13.328648°N 79.725002°E
- Country: India
- State: Andhra Pradesh
- District: Chittoor
- Talukas: Vijayapuram

Government
  - MLA: Rk Roja

Area
  - Total: 7.24 km^{2} (2.80 sq mi)

Population (2011)
  - Total: 2,101
  - Density: 290/km^{2} (752/sq mi)

Languages
  - Official: Telugu
- Time zone: UTC+5:30 (IST)
- PIN: AP-517586
- Telephone code: 91-8577

Kaliambakam is a village in Chittoor district of the Indian state of Andhra Pradesh. It is located in Vijayapuram mandal of Chittoor revenue division.There are 900+ people are living there, and there are 150+ houses.
