= Nagari revenue division =

Administrative division in Andhra Pradesh, India

- Revenue division in Chittoor district
- Country: India
- State: Andhra Pradesh
- District: Chittoor
- Formed: 4 April 2022
- Founder: Government of Andhra Pradesh
- Headquarters: Nagari
- Time zone: UTC+05:30 (IST)

Nagari revenue division is an administrative division in the Chittoor district of the Indian state of Andhra Pradesh. It is one of the 4 Revenue Divisions in the district with 5 mandals under its administration with headquarters at Nagari.

== Administration ==
There are 5 mandals in the division.

1. Karvetinagar
2. Nagari
3. Nindra
4. Palasamudram
5. Vijayapuram
