= Diguvamasapalle =

- village
- Interactive map of Diguvamasapalle
- Location in Andhra Pradesh, India Diguvamasapalle (India)
- Coordinates: 13°16′58″N 79°1′20″E
- Country: India
- State: Andhra Pradesh
- District: Chittoor

Population (2001)
  - Total: 3,835

Languages
  - Official: Telugu
- Time zone: UTC+5:30 (IST)
- PIN: 517419
- Telephone code: 08572320740
- Sex ratio: 1.01 ♂/♀
- Lok Sabha constituency: Chittoor
- Vidhan Sabha constituency: Chittoor
- Climate: Good (Köppen)

Cattle Farming

Diguvamasapalle (Eguvamasapalli) is a village in Chittoor mandal in Chittoor district in the Indian state of Andhra Pradesh. As of 2001 it had a population of 3835 in 883 households.

== Geography ==
It is located approximately 10 kilometers from Chittoor town. It is also located near to Kanipakam (temple town of lord Ganesha) and Tiruthani (a place in Tamil Nadu famous for Lord Muruga temple which is located on hills).

== Economy ==
Mango Grove

This village is surrounded by mango groves and sugar cane fields. Cultivation and cattle farming are the main occupations of the inhabitants. Women in the village get benefit through Development of Women and Children in Rural Areas (DWCRA), a program initiated by the central government which helps them in receiving loans for their self-employment at less interest.

== Education ==
This village has minimum facilities with primary health center, Veterinary Hospital and Primary school. Many people from this place are well educated working in different parts of the world.

== Religion ==
In the middle of the village Lord Krishna's temple is located, which is a symbol of peace and devotion.

== Transport ==
People travelling to this village can take town bus with number nine from old chittoor bus stand.
