= Samireddy palli =

Samireddy Palli is a village near Yadamari, Chittoor District, Andhra Pradesh, India. The village is famous for milk and mangoes.
