= Yerrathivaripalli =

Yerrathivaripalli Madanapalle
- village
- Interactive map of Yerrathivaripalli
- Location within Andhra Pradesh Location within India
- Coordinates: 13.54955°N 78.59010°E
- Country: India
- State: Andhra Pradesh
- District: Chittoor

Area
  - Total: 2 km^{2} (0.77 sq mi)
- Elevation: 695 m (2,280 ft)

Population (2013)
  - Total: 400
  - Density: 200/km^{2} (520/sq mi)

Languages
  - Official: Telugu
- Time zone: UTC+5:30 (IST)
- PIN: 517325
- Telephone code: 918571
- Vehicle registration: AP 03

Yerrathivaripalli is a village which comes under Madanapalli Taluk. Its ia 9.2 km from Madanapalli and it is in Nimmanapalli mandal located in the Chittoor district of Andhra Pradesh state, India - population 400 (2011 census).

== Etymology ==
Legend has it that the name of the town was originally "Sathram ", which has, over time, changed into " Yerrathivaripalli".

== Horsley Hills ==
Horsley Hills is situated near Yerrathivaripalli in Chittoor District at an altitude of 4400 feet (1314 m) above sea level. Mr. W.D. Horsley, a British member of the civil service and the then District Collector of Cuddapah, who found the climate very hot, selected this area as his summer resort on the top of the hills. He constructed two houses, the Kachari Room and the Milk Bungalow and developed it as a summer resort. There are four engineering colleges in Madanapalli and MITS Engineering college is the famous among them all. MITS is located at the foot of the Horsley Hills. World Health Organization's TB Sanatorium situated at about 8 km is a well known centre for TB research and cure.

== Demographics ==
Description Village - Yerrathivaripalli. Government - Panchayath. Urban Agglomeration - Reddivaripalli. State - Andhra Pradesh.

Yerrathivaripalli village	Total	Male	Female
Population	400	265	235
Literates	260	160	100
Children (0-6)	38	21	17
Average Literacy (%)	55.67	67.66	45.32
Sexratio	1012		
Child Sexratio	937		

Yerrathivaripalli village comes under Reddivaripalli Panchayath.
