= Baireddipalle mandal =

Baireddipalle mandal Baireddy Palle
- Mandal
- Interactive map of Baireddipalle mandal
- Location in Andhra Pradesh, India
- Coordinates: 13.0833°N 78.6167°E
- Country: India
- State: Andhra Pradesh
- District: Chittoor
- Elevation: 764 m (2,507 ft)

Population (2011)
  - Total: 7,225

Languages
  - Official: Telugu
- Time zone: UTC+5:30 (IST)
- PIN: 517415
- Vehicle registration: AP

Baireddipalle mandal (Baireddy Palle mandal) is in Palamaner Revenue Division and Chittoor district of the Indian state of Andhra Pradesh.

Early settlements date back to 1700s, when Baireddi Bayye Gowda migrated from Bengaluru and started this settlement as a small village to cultivate paddy. The town is named after him. During the Victoria era, his descendants (notably Pedda Seshe Gowda) led the effort to construct many lakes & barrages (in the mid 1800s). In return, Mr. Gowda was granted land by the Arcot Collector.

Over the years, the Gowda family contributed to the growth & development of the town. Notably Dodde Gowda (1893-1967), the Manegar donated huge pieces of land for the construction of Elementary school & ZP High school.

Notable people:

1. B. Rame Gowda 1924-2000 (served as ZP chairman - Chittoor)

== Geography ==
Baireddipalle has an average elevation of 764 metres (2,507 ft). It is bordered between Karnataka State and Tamil Nadu State borders.

Baireddipalle is about 55 kilometres West of Chittoor Town.

Baireddipalle Mandal is bounded on the South/West by VKota (Venkatagirikota) Mandal, North/East by Palamaner/Gangavaram/Peddapanjani Mandals, South by Tamil Nadu State Border and West by Karnataka State Border.

Baireddipalle Mandal is in Madanapalle Revenue division since the Revenue Mandal Reorganization in 1985.

Chittoor District is in the southernmost part of State so also Rayalaseema Region. Chittoor District is bounded on the North by Ananthapur and Kadapa districts, East [part] by Nellore district, East [part] & South Tamil Nadu State and West by Kolar district of Karnataka State.

Residents speak Telugu, Urdu, Tamil and Kannada.

== Grama Panchayats in Baireddipalle Mandal ==
1. Baireddipalle 2. Nellipatla 3. Lakkanapalle 4. Belupalle 5. Theertham 6. Chappidipalle 7. Devadoddi 8. Pathapeta 9. Dharmapuri 10. Gollacheemanapalle 11. Kammanapalle 12. Peddachellaragunta 13. Ganginayanipalle 14. Kadapanatham 15. Khambhamapalle 16. Alapalle 17. Gadduru 18. M.Kothur 19. Pathurnatham 20. Gownithemmepalle

== Villages in Baireddipalle Mandal ==
- Ala Palle
- Baireddi Palle
- Belu Palle
- Chappidi Palle
- Deva Doddi
- Dharma Puri
- Donthi Ralla Palle
- Gangi Nayani Palle
- Golla Cheemana Palle
- Gouni Thimme Palle
- Kadapa Natham
- Kaigallu
- Kambham Palle
- Kammana Palle
- Lakkana Palle
- Meakala Nagireddi Palle
- Mula Thimme Palle
- Muraripalle
- Nelli Patla
- Pathur Natham
- Pedda Chellara Gunta
- Raghunayakula Dinne
- Setti Palle
- Theertham
- Thimmaiah Gari Palle
- Veerla Banda

== High Schools, with School Code in Baireddipalle Mandal ==
28236101309 ZP High School, Baireddipalle (Boys) 28236101311 ZP High School, Baireddipalle (Girls) 28236101312 ZP High School, Baireddipalle (Urdu)

The afore mentioned schools were built on the properties donated by B. Dodde Gowda (1893-1967)

28236101009 ZP High School, Belupalle 28236101502 ZP High School, Kadapanatham 28236100806 ZP High School, Lakkana Palle 28236102305 ZP High School, Nellipatla 28236100106 ZP High School, Peddachallara Gunta 28236100508 ZP High School, Teertham 28236101107 AP Model School, Baireddipalle 28236101313 Kasturba (KGBV) School, Baireddipalle 28236101106 AP Residential School(Girls) Kammanapalle 28236101314 Morning Star High School, Baireddipalle 28236101310 Sri Saraswathi High School, Baireddipalle

== High School Clusters under Baireddypalle ZP High School ==
(1) Baireddipalle (2) Belupalle (3) Kadapanatham (4) Lakkana Palle (5) Nelli Patla (6) Teertham

== Post Offices with Baireddipalle Pincode (517415) ==
- Alapalle
- Dasarlapalle
- Kadapanatham
- Lakkanapalle
- Peddachellaragunta
- Theertham

== Population as of 2011 ==
Baireddipalle is a large village located in Baireddipalle Mandal of Chittoor district, Andhra Pradesh with total 1582 families residing. The Baireddipalle village has population of 7225 of which 3731 are males while 3494 are females as per Population Census 2011.

In Baireddipalle village population of children with age 0-6 is 815 which makes up 11.28% of total population of village. Average Sex Ratio of Baireddipalle village is 936 which is lower than Andhra Pradesh state average of 993. Child Sex Ratio for the Baireddipalle as per census is 869, lower than Andhra Pradesh average of 939.

Baireddipalle village has higher literacy rate compared to Andhra Pradesh. In 2011, literacy rate of Baireddipalle village was 70.36% compared to 67.02% of Andhra Pradesh. In Baireddipalle Male literacy stands at 79.39% while female literacy rate was 60.80%.

As per constitution of India and Panchyati Raaj Act, Baireddipalle village is administrated by Sarpanch (Head of Village) who is elected representative of village.

Particulars Total Male Female Total Houses 1,582 - - Population 7,225 3,731 3,494 Child (0–6) 815 436 379 Schedule Caste 1,049 562 487 Schedule Tribe 86 58 28 Literacy 70.36% 79.39% 60.80% Total Workers 3,038 2,092 946 Main Worker 2,848 - - Marginal Worker 190 103 87

As of 2011 Census, The total population of Baireddipalle Mandal is 56,538

== Caste Factor ==
As of 2011 Census, Schedule Caste (SC) constitutes 14.52% while Schedule Tribe (ST) were 1.19% of total population in Baireddipalle village.

== Work Profile ==
As of 2011 Census, In Baireddipalle village out of total population, 3038 were engaged in work activities. 93.75% of workers describe their work as Main Work (Employment or Earning more than 6 Months) while 6.25% were involved in Marginal activity providing livelihood for less than 6 months. Of 3038 workers engaged in Main Work, 665 were cultivators (owner or co-owner) while 1158 were Agricultural labourers.
