= Kollagunta =

Coordinates: 13°21′N 79°25′E

- Village
- Interactive map of Kollagunta
- Location in Andhra Pradesh, India
- Country: India
- State: Andhra Pradesh
- District: Chittoor
- Mandal: Karvetinagar

Population (2011)
  - Total: 3,394

Languages
  - Official: Telugu
- Time zone: UTC+5:30 (IST)

Kollagunta is a village in Chittoor district of the Indian state of Andhra Pradesh. It is located in Karvetinagar mandal.kollagunta village situated exactly at Andhrapradesh and Tamil Nadu Border.

== About ==
According to Census 2011 information the location code or village code of Kollagunta village is 596433. It is situated 12 km away from sub-district headquarter Karvetinagaram and 42 km away from district headquarter Chittoor. As per 2009 stats, Kollagunta village is also a gram panchayat.

The total geographical area of the village is 355 hectares. Kollagunta has a total population of 3,394 peoples. There are about 833 houses in Kollagunta village. Tirupati is the nearest town to Kollagunta which is approximately 55 km away.

== Temples in Kollagunta Village ==
- Padiveti Amma
- Kanakamedalamma (Grama Devatha)
- Om Shakthi
- Darmaraja Temple
- Lord Vinayaka
- Ayyappa Swamy
- Muneswara Swamy
- Krishna bajan mandir.
- Lord Muruga (Inside of Kanakamedalamma temple)
- Lord Shiva (Inside of Kanakamedalamma temple)
- krishna Temple (rythu street)

== Village Festivals in Kollagunta Village ==
- Ganga Jathara: They will conduct in The month of March 2 Days Festival
- Darmaraja Tirunallu: They will conduct in the month of MaY 18 Days Festivals
- Ayyappa Jyothi Pooja in the Month Of Oct-Dec.
- Om Shakthi Pooja in the month of Oct -Nov will be conducted
- Lord Vinayaka Festival celebrate by Youth
