= Panatoor =

- village
- Interactive map of Panatoor
- Location in Andhra Pradesh, India Panatoor (India)
- Coordinates: 13.0559°N 79.1370°E
- Country: India
- State: Andhra Pradesh
- District: Chittoor
- Mandal: Gudipala
- Elevation: 300 m (980 ft)

Population (2013)
  - Total: 1,039

Languages
  - Official: Telugu
- Time zone: UTC+5:30 (IST)
- PIN: 517132
- Telephone code: 08572
- Vehicle registration: AP

Panatoor is a village in the Chittoor district of Andhra Pradesh in India.

== Location ==
Panatoor is located on the Chittoor-Vellore road which is an intersection road from Bangalore-Chennai NH4 Highway, the village is located 2 km from the Tamil Nadu border. It is 191 kilometres (119 mi) from Bengaluru.

== Administration ==
Panatoor comes under Gudipala Mandal and Chittoor district. The official language is Telugu.
