= Palamaner revenue division =

Administrative division in Andhra Pradesh, India

- Revenue division in Chittoor district
- Palamaner revenue division in Chittoor district
- Country: India
- State: Andhra Pradesh
- District: Chittoor
- Formed: 4 April 2022
- Founder: Government of Andhra Pradesh
- Headquarters: Palamaner
- Time zone: UTC+05:30 (IST)

Palamaner revenue division is an administrative division in the Chittoor district of the Indian state of Andhra Pradesh. It is one of the 4 Revenue Divisions in the district with 5 mandals under its administration with headquarters at Palamaner.

== History ==
This revenue division originally consist of 10 mandals .On 31st December 2025 five mandals where transferred to Annamayya district.

== Administration ==
There are 5 mandals in the division.

1. Baireddipalle
2. Palamaner
3. Gangavaram
4. Peddapanjani
5. Venkatagirikota

== See also ==
- List of revenue divisions in Andhra Pradesh
- List of mandals in Andhra Pradesh
- Chittoor district
- Chittoor revenue division
- Nagari revenue division
- Kuppam revenue division
