= Kaigal Water Falls =

Waterfall in Andhra Pradesh, India

Kaigal Water Falls is a waterfall situated in the Chittoor district of Andhra Pradesh, India. The falls are surrounded by the Koundinya Wildlife Sanctuary. The falls are 40 feet tall.

The falls are formed by the Kaigal stream, one of the two streams flowing through the Koundinya Wildlife Sanctuary, the other being Koudinya stream.

== Name ==
Locally the falls are known as Dumukurallu Water Falls, which comes from the Telugu word for "jumping stones".
