= Chittoor Rural mandal =

- Mandal
- Interactive map of Chittoor Rural mandal
- Location in Andhra Pradesh, India
- Country: India
- State: Andhra Pradesh
- District: Chittoor
- Headquarters: Chittoor

Languages
  - Official: Telugu
- Time zone: UTC+5:30 (IST)
- Vehicle registration: AP03

Chittoor Rural mandal is a mandal in Chittoor district of the state of Andhra Pradesh in India. Its headquarters are located at Chittoor. This is formed by dividing Chittoor mandal on 8 May 2023.

== Towns and villages ==
1. 194 Bandapalle
2. 33-venkatapuram
3. 5-Venkatapuram
4. Alukurupalle
5. Anagallu
6. Ananthapuram
7. Arathala
8. Ayanavedu
9. B.N.R.Pet
10. Chinthalagunta
11. Diguvamasapalle
12. Gollapalle
13. Guvvakallu
14. Krishnapuram
15. Kurchivedu
16. Muthukur
17. Palooru
18. Paschanapalle
19. Peddisettipalle
20. Perumallakandiga
21. Settiappanthangal
22. Siddampalle
23. Thalambedu
24. Thenabanda
25. Thumminda
26. Varadarajulapalle
