= Koundinya Wildlife Sanctuary =

Wildlife sanctuary and elephant reserve in Andhra Pradesh, India

Kaundinya Wildlife Sanctuary
- IUCN category IV (habitat/species management area)
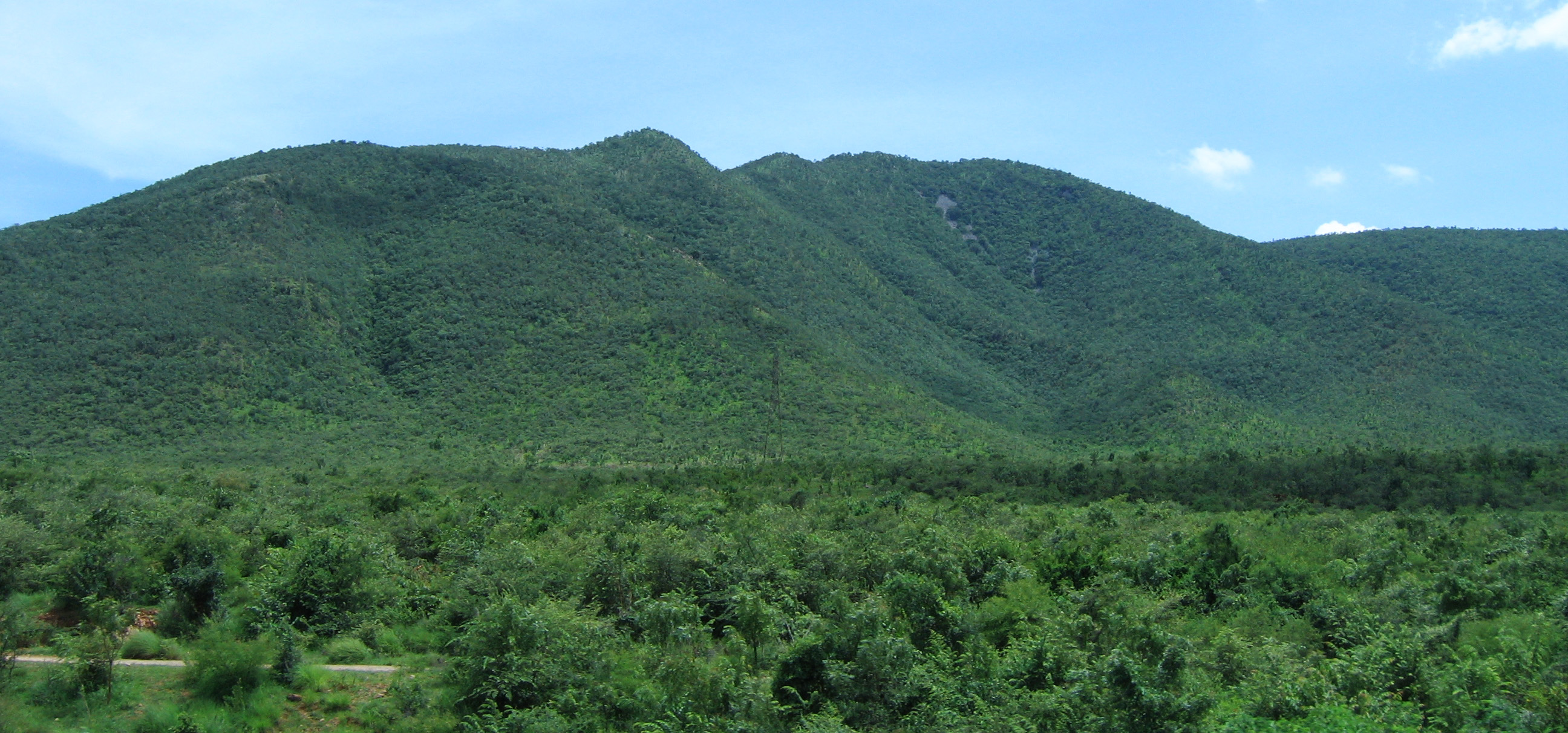
- View of a part of the Sanctuary

- Location within Andhra Pradesh Location within India
- Interactive map of Kaundinya Wildlife Sanctuary
- Location: Andhra Pradesh, India
- Nearest city: Chittoor
- Coordinates: 13°01′30″N 78°38′42″E
- Area: 357.6 km^{2} (88,400 acres)
- Established: December 1990
- Governing body: Andhra Pradesh Forest Department

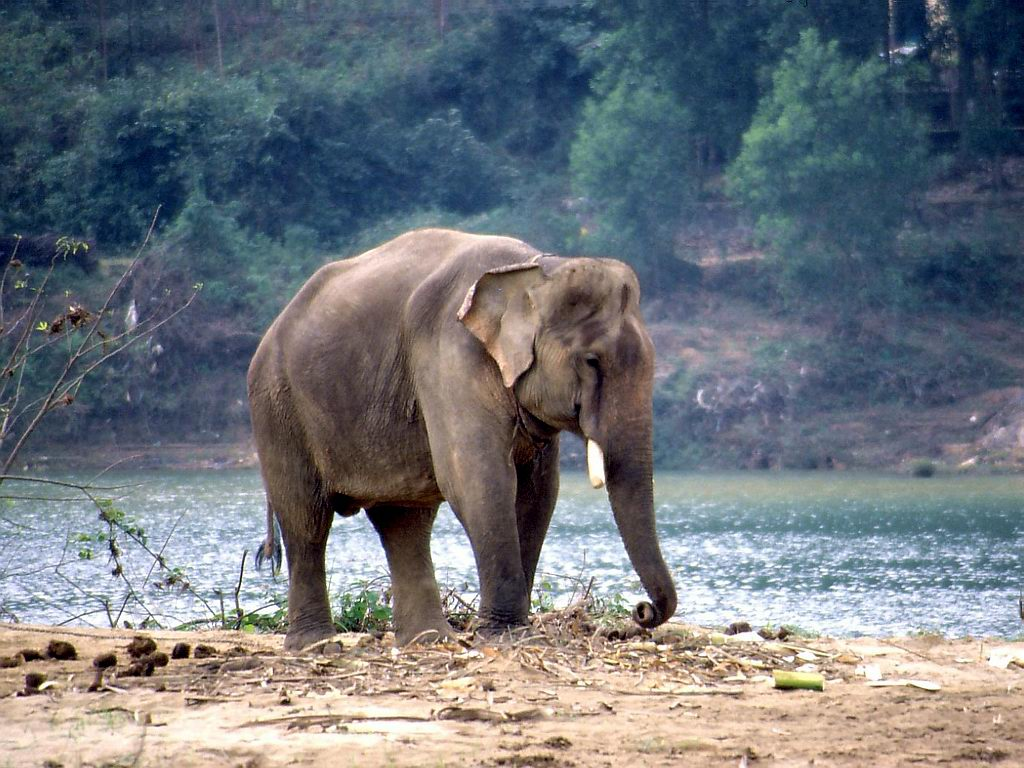
Asian elephant

Kaundinya Wildlife Sanctuary is a wildlife sanctuary and an elephant reserve situated in Andhra Pradesh, India. It is the only sanctuary in Andhra Pradesh with a population of Asian elephants, which migrated after 200 years from neighbouring regions.

== History ==
Kaundinya is a region to which elephants have returned after 200 years. In the last decade, elephants have been migrating more than ever before, looking for habitable forests. From 1983 to 1986, a sizable number of elephants began their journey from the forests of Anekal-Hosur in Tamil Nadu and Bannerghatta in Karnataka to seek alternative homes in other regions. Thirty-nine of the elephants moved to the forests of Andhra Pradesh, a state which had no elephants before. This led to the government setting up the sanctuary in December 1990. Today it is home to about 72 elephants.

== Geography ==
The habitat of Kaundinya sanctuary is rugged with high hills and deep valleys. The sanctuary has dry deciduous forests with thorny scrubs interspersed with trees. These forests have small ponds, tanks and the Kaindinya and Kaigal tributaries of Palar River. The sanctuary is situated in region where the Kolar Plateau ends and slopes down into the plains of Tamil Nadu creating many valleys and ghats.

=== Kalyan Revu Water Falls ===
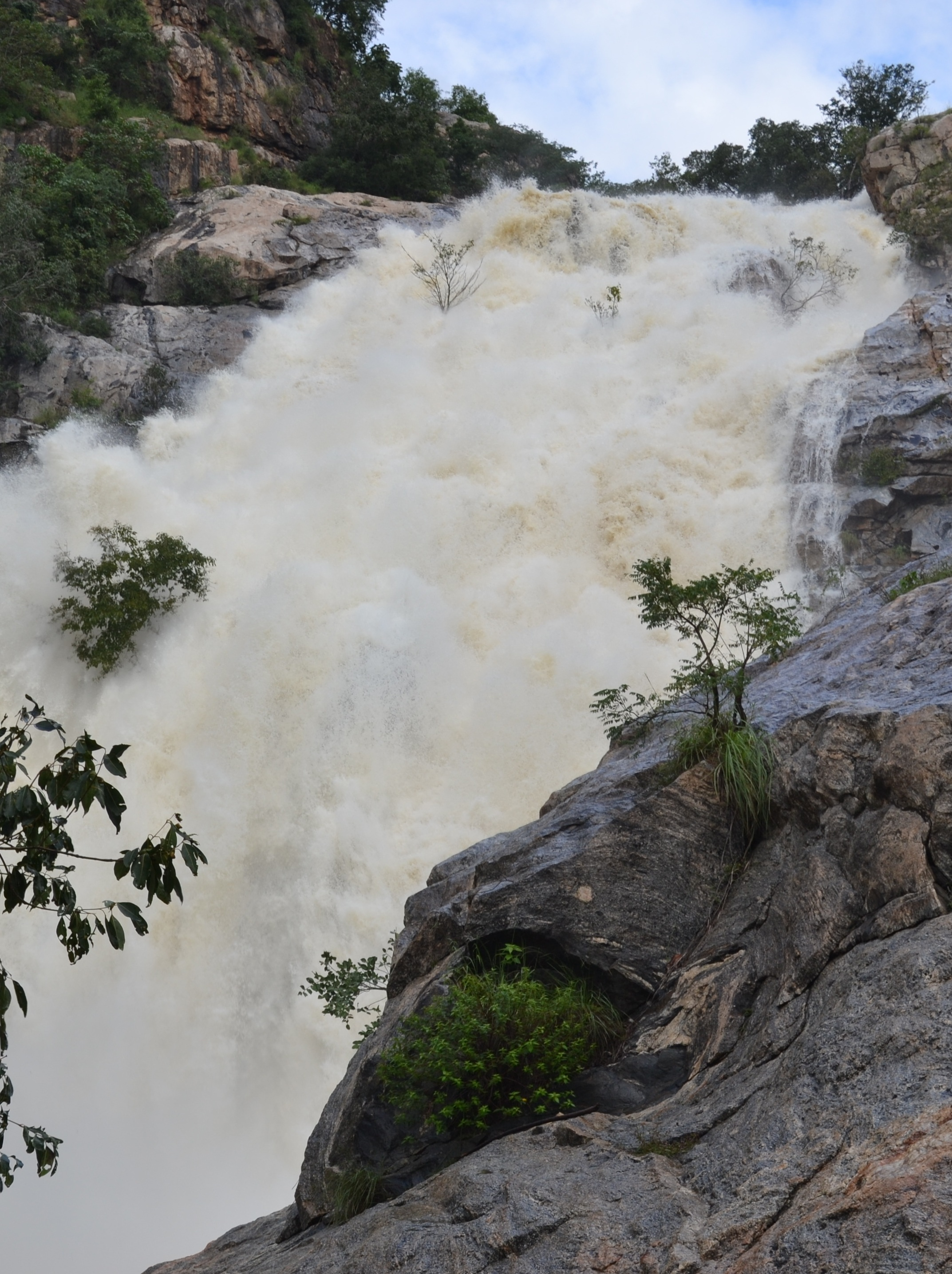
Kalyan Revu Water Falls

Kalyana Revu WaterFalls (also called Kalyan Drive Falls) is a waterfall located to the North of Palamaner in the Chittoor district of India in the Koudinya Wildlife Sanctuary. The falls are located 10 kilometres from Palamaner.

=== Kaigal Water Falls ===
Kaigal Waterfalls is a waterfall located to the west of Palamaner in the Chittoor district of India in the Koudinya Wildlife Sanctuary. The falls are located 28 kilometres from Palamaner and 10 km from V.Kota. It lies between Palamaner and Kuppam national highway.

== Flora and fauna ==
The sanctuary is covered by southern tropical dry deciduous and thorn forests. Some of the important flora consists of Albizia amara, Acacia, Lagerstroemia, Ficus, bamboo, and a species which is a regeneration of Santalum album.

The sanctuary is primarily an elephant reserve and is home to about 78 Indian elephants. The vulnerable yellow-throated bulbul is present in the sanctuary. Some of the other animals found in the sanctuary are sloth bear, panther, cheetal, chowsingha, sambar, porcupine, wild boar, jungle cat, jackal, jungle fowl, starred tortoise and slender loris.

== Threats and conservation issues ==
The threats faced in the sanctuary are man-animal conflict, over-grazing, illegal collection of wood. Insufficient fodder in the forest due to over-grazing by livestock, and availability of crops like sugarcane, sorghum and ragi attracts elephants, resulting in man-animal conflict. As of 2002, 42 people have been killed by elephants, and 12 elephants have been electrocuted to death by local population.

Kalyani Dam in Chamala Valley, a part of Sri Venkateswara National Park, in Tirupati is a good habitat for elephants. A corridor for elephants is being planned between Koundinya Wildlife Sanctuary and Sri Venkateswara National Park under Project Elephant.
