= Bandarlapalle =

- Village
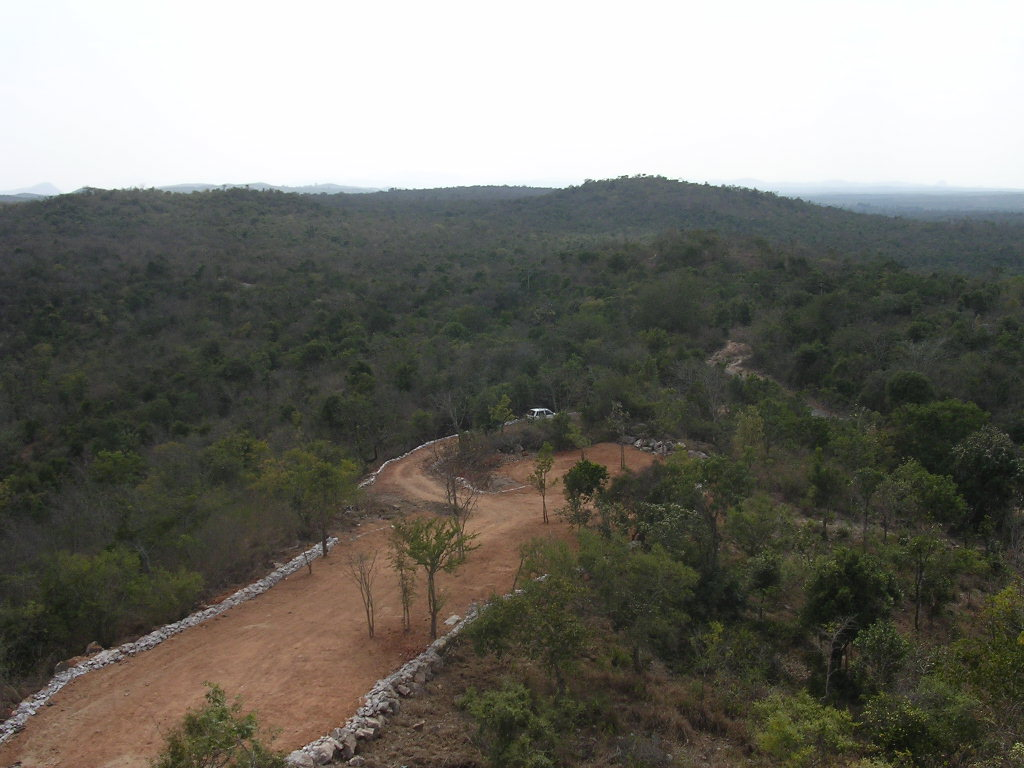
- The forests of the Eastern Ghats near Bandarlapalle
- Interactive map of Bandarlapalle
- Location in Andhra Pradesh, India
- Coordinates: 13°19′51″N 79°5′56″E
- Country: India
- State: Andhra Pradesh
- District: Chittoor

Population (2011)
  - Total: 6,034

Languages
  - Official: Telugu
- Time zone: UTC+5:30 (IST)
- Vehicle registration: AP

Bandarlapalle is a village in the Ramakuppam mandal located in Chittoor district in the Indian state of Andhra Pradesh.Bandarlapalle is situated in the southern part of Chittoor district in Andhra Pradesh, near the state borders with Karnataka and Tamil Nadu. The village is situated within the Eastern Ghats geographic zone, characterized by surrounding forest reserves and hilly terrain.Agriculture and dairy farming are the main local occupations.The village is governed under the Ramakuppam mandal division.

== Population ==
Population (as per the 2011 census) - Total 6,034; 3,087 males; 2,947 females; no. of houses: 1,294

Education

Bandarlapalle has three primary schools.Primary education in the village is administered under the local school board.

- References
