= Chittoor Urban mandal =

- Mandal
- Interactive map of Chittoor Urban mandal
- Location in Andhra Pradesh, India
- Country: India
- State: Andhra Pradesh
- District: Chittoor
- Headquarters: Chittoor

Languages
  - Official: Telugu
- Time zone: UTC+5:30 (IST)
- Vehicle registration: AP03

Chittoor Urban mandal is a mandal in Chittoor district of the state of Andhra Pradesh in India. Its headquarters are located at Chittoor. This is formed by dividing Chittoor mandal on 8 May 2023.

== Towns and villages ==
1. Anupalle
2. Anuppalle part
3. Chittoor
4. Doddipalle
5. Gandlapalle
6. Greamspet
7. Iruvaram
8. Kattamanchi
9. Lakshmambapuram
10. Mangasamudram
11. Mapakshi
12. Mapakshi Part
13. Murakambattu
14. Narigapalle
15. Thimmasamudram
