= P. Chinnamma Reddy =

Indian politician

P. Chinnamma Reddy was a prominent politician in the Chittoor district, Andhra Pradesh, India until the 1960s. He played an important political role as a follower of the future President of India, Neelam Sanjeeva Reddy. He was known for building P.C.R. Junior College and Krishnavani Junior College, and for establishing the Chittoor cooperative sugar factory. He was a member of the Andhra State Legislative Assembly from 1955 to 1957, representing the Indian National Congress Party. He also had a main role in developing the K M Reddy junior college which was established by Konda Muni Reddy.
