= Veeranjaneya Temple, Ardhagiri =

Temple in Aragonda, Andhra Pradesh, India

Veeranjaneya Temple
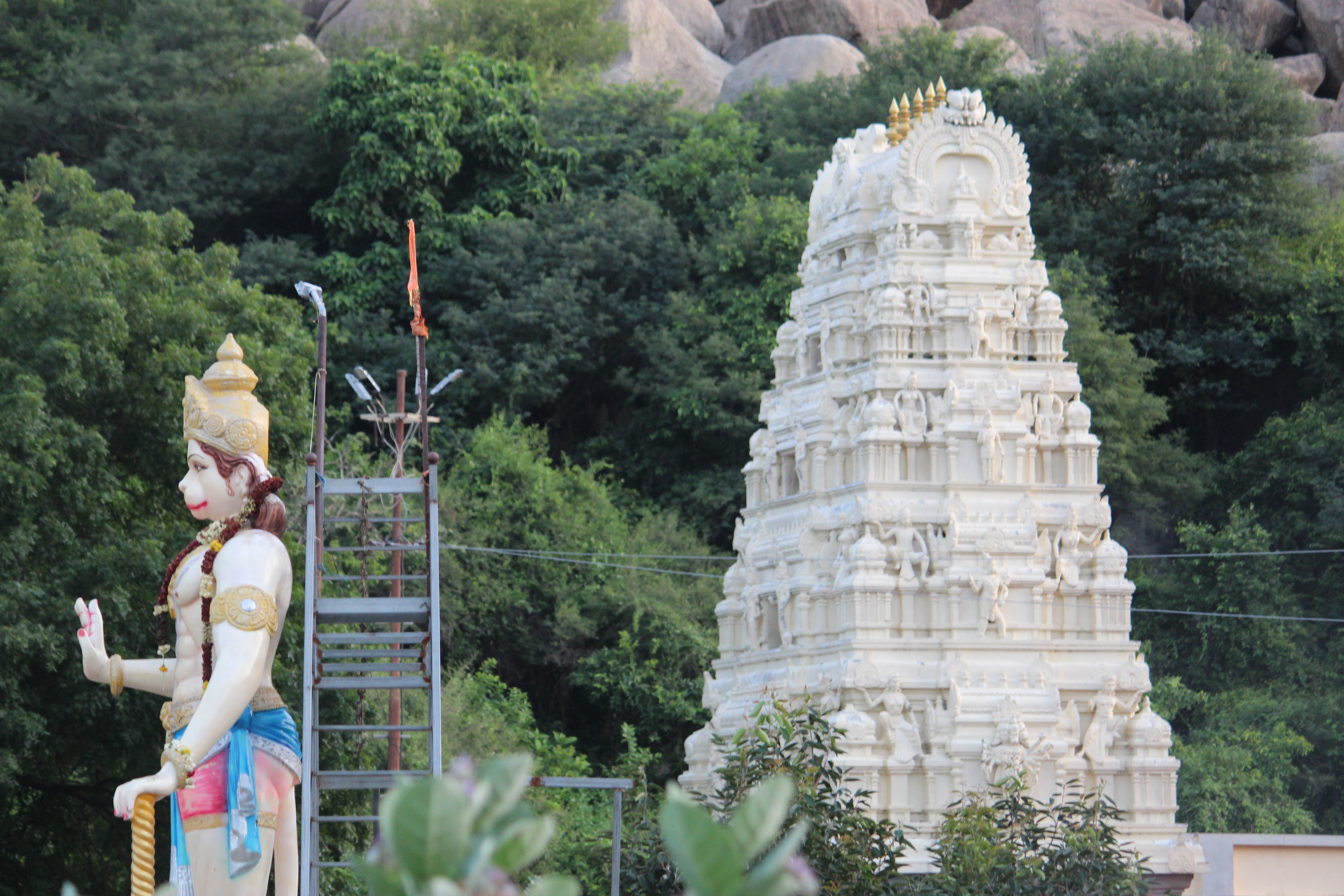

Religion
- Affiliation: Hinduism
- District: Chittoor
- Deity: Hanuman

Location
- Location: Aragonda
- State: Andhra Pradesh
- Country: India

Architecture
- Type: Dravidian architecture
- Temple: 1
- Inscriptions: Dravidian languages and Sanskrit

Veeranjaneya Temple is a temple on the hill of Ardhagiri, dedicated to Lord Hanuman. It is situated in Aragonda of Chittoor district in the Indian state of Andhra Pradesh.

== Etymology ==
The hill Ardhagiri literally translates to half mountain, which was a fallen part of Sanjeevani Mountain transported by Lord Hanuman in Treta Yuga. Hence, the name Ardhagiri and the temple was dedicated to Lord Hanuman.
