= Pachikapalam =

Pachikapallam
- village
- Nickname: ppm
- Interactive map of Pachikapallam
- Location in Andhra Pradesh, India Pachikapallam (India)
- Coordinates: 13.4167°N 79.4500°E
- Country: India
- State: Andhra Pradesh
- District: Chittoor
- Elevation: 266 m (873 ft)

Languages
  - Official: Telugu
- Time zone: UTC+5:30 (IST)
- 517569: 517569

Pachikapallam is a village and a Subdivisions of India in Chittoor district in the state of Andhra Pradesh in India.

== Geography ==
Pachikapalam is located at 13.4167°N 79.4500°E. It has an average elevation of 266 meters (875 feet).
