= Vaikuntanatha Temple, Therani =

Temple in Chittoor, India

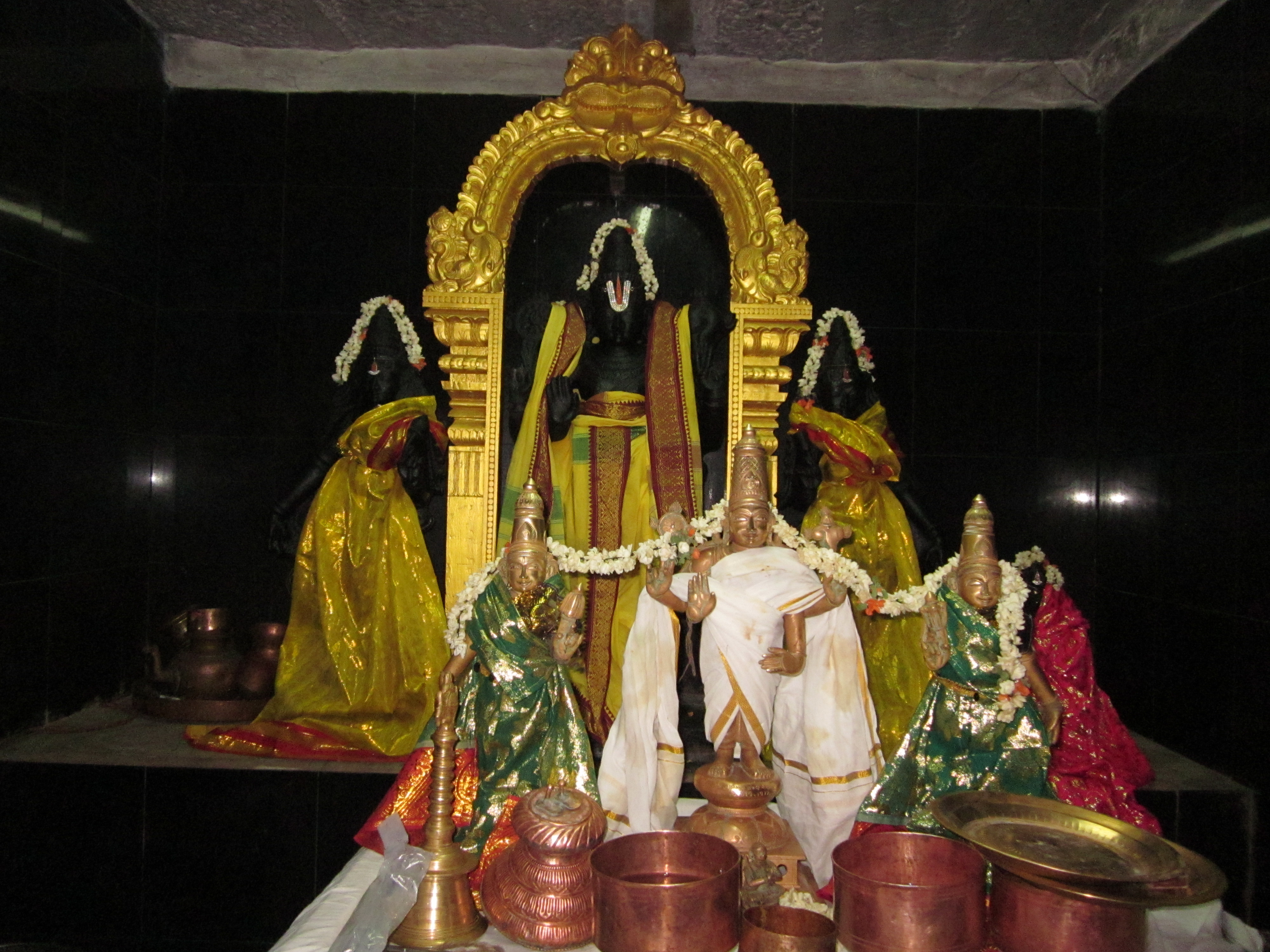
The temple in 2011

Vaikuntanatha Swamy Temple is a Vaishnavite temple at Therani village in Chittoor District of Andhra Pradesh, India. The temple is dedicated to Vishnu, who is referred to as Vaikuntanatha, and was built in the 16th century on the banks of the river Kushasthali.

== History ==
The temple was built during 16th Century by Sudarsanachary, a pundit in the royal court of the Karvetinagaram which was a part of Vijayanagara Empire. The temple was most neglected and turned into a ramshackle structure over a period of time. The temple had undergone recent renovation works with donations from a devotee.

== See also ==
- Therani
- Hindu Temples in Tirupati
