= Talari Manohar =

Indian politician

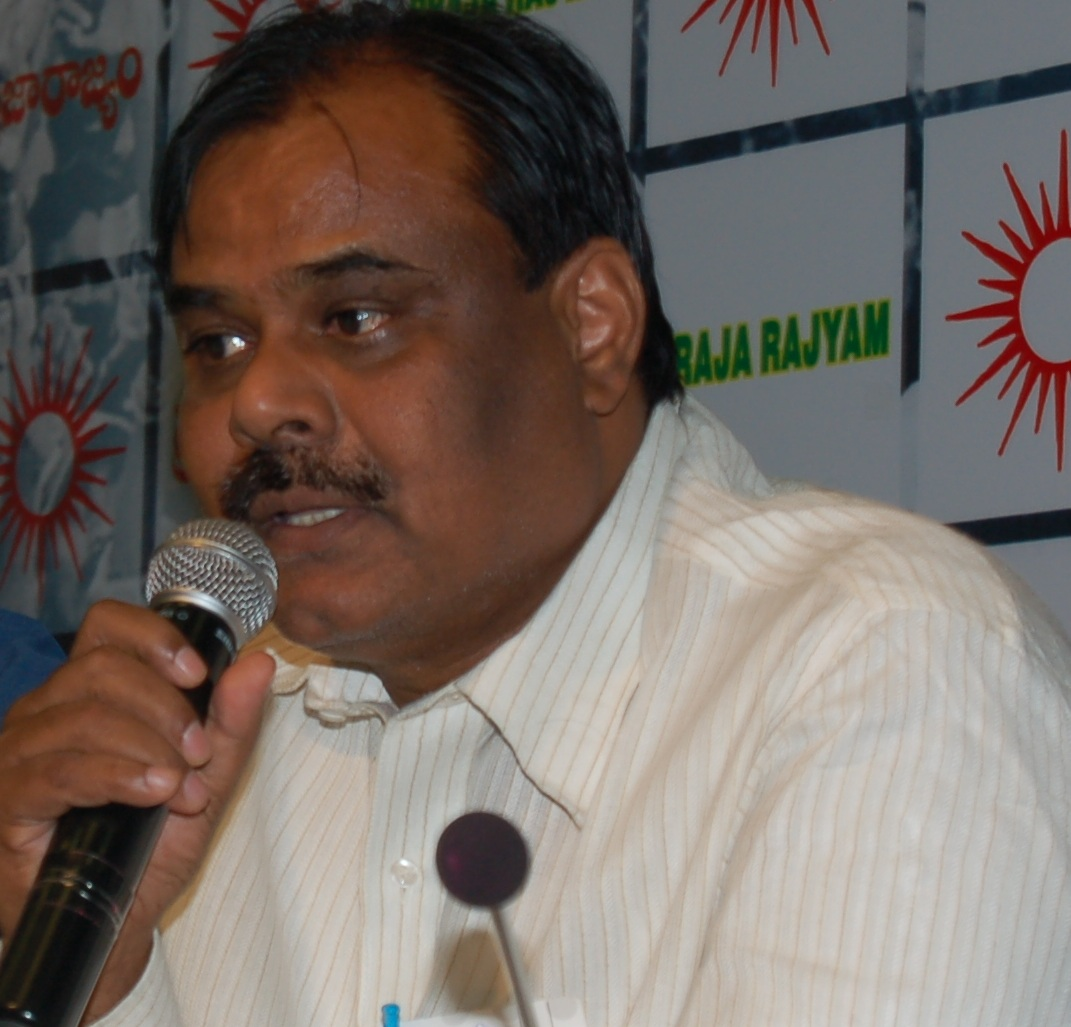
Talari Manohar (2009)

Talari Manohar (born 1954) is a politician from Chittoor, Andhra Pradesh, India.

He served as Member of the Legislative Assembly and also as a Member of Parliament in the '80s and '90s. He was a founding member of the Telugu Desam Party (TDP). He later joined the Praja Rajyam Party (PRP). He lost in the 2009 elections contesting for Member of Parliament from Chittoor. He has been active in politics since his student days at Sri Venkateswara University. He is a contemporary of Nara Chandra Babu Naidu who is the current president of Telugu Desam Party.

Due to the merger of the Praja Rajyam Party, he is now in the Indian National Congress.
