= Nindra =

- Village
- Interactive map of Nindra
- Location in Andhra Pradesh, India Nindra (India)
- Coordinates: 13.3831°N 79.6963°E
- Country: India
- State: Andhra Pradesh
- District: Chittoor
- Mandal: Nindra

Area
  - Total: 10.74 km^{2} (4.15 sq mi)

Population (2011)
  - Total: 3,899
  - Density: 363.0/km^{2} (940.3/sq mi)

Languages
  - Official: Telugu
- Time zone: UTC+5:30 (IST)
- PIN: 517591
- Telephone code: +91–8577
- Vehicle registration: AP

Nindra is a village in Chittoor district of the Indian state of Andhra Pradesh. It is the mandal headquarters of Nindra mandal in Nagari revenue division.
