= Horsley Hills =

Horsley Hills Yengu Mallamma Kondalu
- Township
- Nickname: ooty of Andhrapradesh
- Location in Andhra Pradesh, India
- Coordinates: 13.66°N 78.40°E
- Country: India
- State: Andhra Pradesh
- Founder: W.D.Horsely

Government
  - Type: Tourism of Andhra Pradesh
  - Body: Horsely Hills Township committee, Chairman: Subcollector, Madanapalle (m)
- Elevation: 1,290 m (4,230 ft)

Languages
  - Official: Telugu
- Time zone: UTC+5:30 (IST)
- Postal code: 517325
- Vehicle registration: AP03

Horsley Hills or Horsleykonda or Yenugulla Mallamma Konda is a series of hills in Andhra Pradesh in Madanapalle Taluka of Annamayya district and is about 9 miles from Madanapalle town. The local name of the hill was Yenugu Mallama Konda after a legend of a saintly old woman named Mallamma who lived at the top of the hill and was fed by elephants (yenugulu). W.D. Horsley, a British collector, built his home around 1870 after whom it is named. In contrast to the dry and hot surrounding, this area is well vegetated with cooler climate. This made it attractive as a hill station and a tourist spot.

== Flora and fauna ==
The native vegetation of the area has been replaced in some parts with dense stands of eucalyptus and plantations of exotic trees. In the historically the area had more wildlife including Sambar deer (now reintroduced into the wild), wild boar and sloth bear. More than 133 species of birds have been documented from the area and these include the endemic Yellow-throated bulbul, first recorded from the area in 1908. Other birds which are rare in the surrounding region include the black eagle and the white-rumped shama. The endemic toad Duttaphrynus hololius has been found here and a ground orchid Diplocentrum recurvum was rediscovered here after nearly a century. Several species of lichen have also been documented from the region.

== Temperature ==
The minimum temperature is around 15 °C and the maximum temperature is 30 °C.

== Geography ==
Horsley Hills lies at an elevation of around 1,265–1,290 metres in the Eastern Ghats, offering a cooler climate compared to the surrounding plains.

== Tourism ==
The major industry of Horsley Hills is tourism. Following are the main attractions of this town

- Gali Bandalu (Wind Rocks) - 300 m from the local bus stand, Gali Banda (Windy Rock) is a rocky slope. The gusty winds blow here whole year
- View Point - it is behind the Governor's Bungalow. It offers the great view of the entire valley, nearby hillocks and dense forests.
- Kalyani, The Eucalyptus Tree - Giant tree of 40 meters height and circumference of 4.7 meters.

== People ==
Before coming into existence as a hill resort i.e. before the advent of W.D.Horsley, this area was home to the tribes of Yanadis and Chenchus. They rear Punganur breed of cows for livelihood. Today, there are different communities of people on the hills. Some of them run small hotels and others work as jeep drivers for tourists.

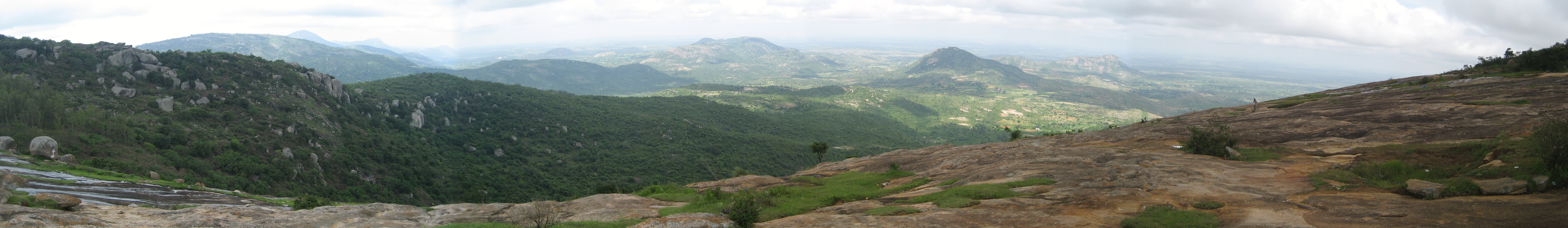
View from Horsley Hills

William D. Horsley was born at Chengalpet on 8 September 1834 where his father John Horsley served in the Madras Civil Service from 1817 to 1851. An older brother, Ralph, born in 1831 at Courtallam, was murdered at Bellary in 1856 where he was a Head Assistant Collector.

== See also ==
- Koundinya Wildlife Sanctuary, Palmaner
- Rishi Valley Education Center
