= Marrimakula Kandriga =

- village
- Interactive map of Marrimakula Kandriga
- Location in Andhra Pradesh, India Marrimakula Kandriga (India)
- Coordinates: 13.4167°N 79.4500°E
- Country: India
- State: Andhra Pradesh
- District: Tirupati
- Mandal: Srikalahasti
- Elevation: 266 m (873 ft)

Languages
  - Official: Telugu
- Time zone: UTC+5:30 (IST)

Marrimakula Kandriga is a village in Srikalahasti mandal, Tirupati district of the Indian state of Andhra Pradesh, India.

== Geography ==
It is situated south of Nallamala Forest approximately 64 km (40 miles) inland from the Bay of Bengal. It has an average elevation of 266 meters (875 feet).

== History ==
Marrimakula Kandriga was a former Zamindar that was most prominent during Vijayanagar rule. One ancestor obtained the favor of the Eastern Chalukya King, Vimala Aditya, and Saluva Narasa was appointed chief of the country around Tirupati, where they found this place by clearing the forest. The founder of the Narasa family was granted permission by his patrons, the Chalukyas, to use the royal seal and boar-signet of the Chalukyas, an ongoing distinction.

Descendants recovered the estate and in 1230 AD, a part of the estate was taken over by Raja Raja Chola the second, of the Chola dynasty. During the next four generations, the Cholas' power decayed. The fortunes of the Pachikapalam Reddy family rose and in 1314, the chief stabilized his power by marrying his daughter to Prolaya Reddy, the first of the Kondavidu Reddy dynasty. The family became feudatories of Vijayanagar and had marriage alliances with the Saluva and loyalties to the Aravidu Dynasty over the next two hundred years.

In the 18th century, the ancestors of Marusani Gangi Reddy, Aragonda Muniratnam Reddy, Bonupalli Munaswami paleyangar (Mudiraj), came to graze their sheep and found that this place had a good water supply, so they decided to settle there. They began to cut down the trees and started to construct houses and plant Banyan trees. The Banyan trees led to the village title of Marrimakula Kandriga.
