= Yadamari =

- Village
- Interactive map of Yadamari
- Location in Andhra Pradesh, India
- Coordinates: 13.1601°N 79.0391°E
- Country: India
- State: Andhra Pradesh
- District: Chittoor
- Mandal: Yadamari mandal

Population (2011)
  - Total: 7,584

Languages
  - Official: Telugu
- Time zone: UTC+5:30 (IST)
- PIN: 517422
- Telephone code: 08572
- Vehicle registration: AP 03

Yadamari (Telugu: యాదమరి) is a village in Chittoor district of the Indian state of Andhra Pradesh. It is the mandal headquarters of Yadamari mandal. Yadamari is suburban of Chittoor city.

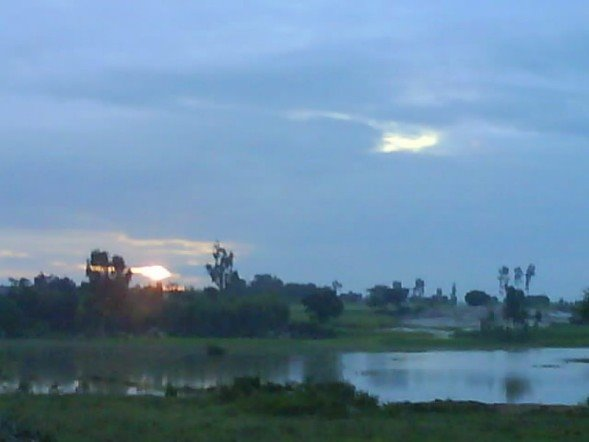
Dakshina Patha Palem - a village near to Yadamari

== See also ==
- Budigipenta
- Samireddy palli
