= Gangadhara Nellore =

Gangadhara Nellor
- Village
- Interactive map of Gangadhara Nellor
- Location in Andhra Pradesh, India Gangadhara Nellor (India)
- Coordinates: 13°18′N 79°12′E
- Country: India
- State: Andhra Pradesh
- District: Chittoor
- Mandal: Gangadhara Nellore

Languages
  - Official: Telugu
- Time zone: UTC+5:30 (IST)
- PIN: 517125
- Vehicle registration: AP 03

Gangadhara Nellore or G.D. Nellore is a village in Chittoor district of the Indian state of Andhra Pradesh. It is the mandal headquarters of Gangadhara Nellore mandal. G D Nellore is suburb of Chittoor.
