= Irala =

- Village
- Interactive map of Irala
- Location in Andhra Pradesh, India Irala (India)
- Coordinates: 13°24′16″N 78°57′31″E
- Country: India
- State: Andhra Pradesh
- District: Chittoor
- Mandal: Irala

Population (2011)
  - Total: 4,973

Languages
  - Official: Telugu
- Time zone: UTC+5:30 (IST)
- BSNL: +91–8573
- Vehicle registration: AP

Irala is a village in Chittoor district of the Indian state of Andhra Pradesh. It is the mandal headquarters of Irala mandal.

Puthramaddi Panchyat Errepalli Panchyat Maddipetlapalli panchyat Kanipakam Panchyat
