= Thavanampalle =

- Mandal
- Interactive map of Thavanampalle
- Location in Andhra Pradesh, India
- Coordinates: 13°17′12″N 79°01′33″E
- Country: India
- State: Andhra Pradesh
- District: Chittoor
- Mandal: Thavanampalle

Population (2011)
  - Total: 4,387

Languages
  - Official: Telugu
- Time zone: UTC+5:30 (IST)
- Vehicle registration: AP 03

Thavanampalle is a village in Chittoor district of the Indian state of Andhra Pradesh. It is the mandal headquarters of Thavanampalle mandal.
