= Vedurukuppam =

- Village
- Interactive map of Vedurukuppam
- Location in Andhra Pradesh, India Vedurukuppam (India)
- Coordinates: 13°27′13″N 79°18′26″E
- Country: India
- State: Andhra Pradesh
- District: Chittoor
- Mandal: Vedurukuppam

Languages
  - Official: Telugu
- Time zone: UTC+5:30 (IST)
- PIN: 517569
- Telephone code: 91–8577
- Vehicle registration: AP03

Vedurukuppam is a village in Chittoor district of the Indian state of Andhra Pradesh. It is the mandal headquarters of Vedurkuppam mandal.
