= Nagari, Chittoor district =

Nagari
- Town
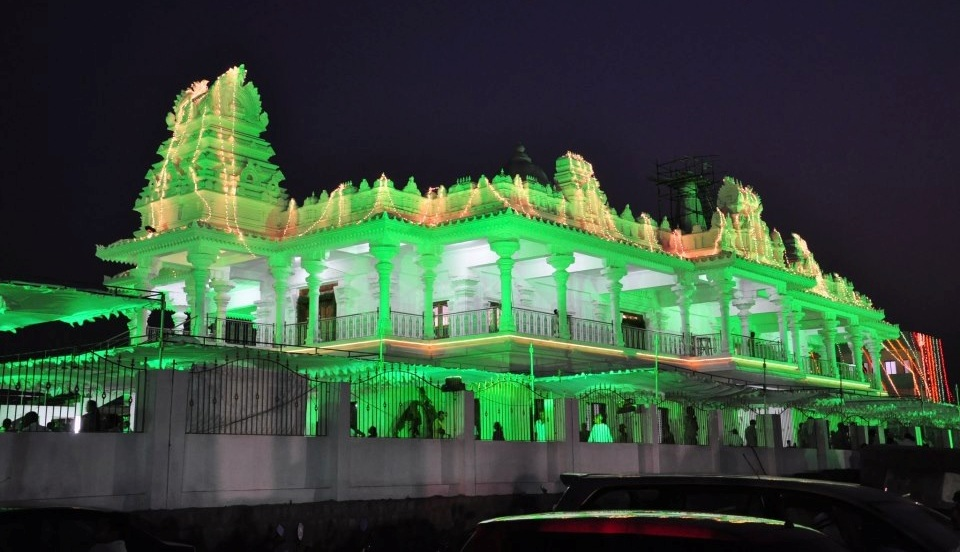
- Sri Shirdi Sai Divyadhamam Temple in Nagari.

- Location in Andhra Pradesh, India
- Coordinates: 13.3214°N 79.5856°E
- Country: India
- State: Andhra Pradesh
- District: Chittoor
- Mandal: Nagari

Government
  - Type: Legislative assembly of Andhra Pradesh
  - Body: Nagari Municipality,Tirupati Urban Development Authority(TUDA)
  - MLA: Gali Bhanuprakash Naidu

Area
  - Total: 35.45 km^{2} (13.69 sq mi)
- Elevation: 115 m (377 ft)

Population (2011)
  - Total: 62,253
  - Density: 1,756/km^{2} (4,548/sq mi)

Languages
  - Official: Telugu
  - Regional: Telugu,Tamil
- Time zone: UTC+5:30 (IST)
- PIN: 517590
- Telephone code: 91-8577
- Vehicle registration: AP-03, AP-39 (New)
- Website: Nagari Municipality

Nagari is a town in Chittoor district of the Indian state of Andhra Pradesh. It is the mandal headquarters of Nagari mandal in Nagari revenue division.

== Geography ==
Nagari is located at 13.33°N 79.58°E. It has an average elevation of 116 metres (380 feet).

== Weather ==
Climate data for Nagari, India
Month	Jan	Feb	Mar	Apr	May	Jun	Jul	Aug	Sep	Oct	Nov	Dec	Year
Mean daily maximum °C (°F)	29.9 (85.8)	32.8 (91.0)	36.7 (98.1)	40.3 (104.5)	43.3 (109.9)	40.8 (105.4)	35.7 (96.3)	34.8 (94.6)	34.8 (94.6)	32.7 (90.9)	30.1 (86.2)	28.9 (84.0)	35.1 (95.1)
Mean daily minimum °C (°F)	18.7 (65.7)	20.1 (68.2)	22.6 (72.7)	26.2 (79.2)	27.9 (82.2)	27.2 (81.0)	25.9 (78.6)	25.5 (77.9)	25.1 (77.2)	23.5 (74.3)	21.7 (71.1)	19.9 (67.8)	23.7 (74.7)
Average precipitation mm (inches)	22.0 (0.87)	19.7 (0.78)	2.9 (0.11)	13.9 (0.55)	45.7 (1.80)	69.7 (2.74)	113.0 (4.45)	118.6 (4.67)	119.1 (4.69)	157.5 (6.20)	218.7 (8.61)	130.5 (5.14)	1,031.3 (40.61)
Source: Indian Meteorological Department

== Demographics ==
As of 2011 Census of India, the town had a population of 96,152. The total population constitute, 48,058 males and 48,094 females —a sex ratio of 1000 females per 1000 males, higher than the national average of 940 per 1000. 10,518 children are in the age group of 0–6 years, of which 5,471 are boys and 5,047 are girls—a ratio of 922 per 1000. The average literacy rate stands at 65.14% with 62,640 literates, lower than the national average of 73.00%.

Languages of Nagari based on 2011 Census
1. Tamil (61.6%)
2. Telugu (35.6%)
3. Urdu (2.45%)
4. Others (0.39%)

== Education ==
The primary and secondary school education is imparted by government, aided and private schools, under the School Education Department of the state.
