= Gudipala =

- Village
- Nickname: Gudipala Cross
- Interactive map of Gudipala
- Location in Andhra Pradesh, India Gudipala (India)
- Coordinates: 13°04′58″N 79°07′09″E
- Country: India
- State: Andhra Pradesh
- District: Chittoor
- Mandal: Gudipala
- Established: 1911

Population
  - Total: 50,000

Languages
  - Official: Telugu, Tamil
- Time zone: UTC+5:30 (IST)
- Postal code: 517132
- Vehicle registration: AP 03

Gudipala is a village nad mandal headquarters of Gudipala mandal in Chittoor district of Andhra Pradesh. Gudipala is a Suburb of Chittoor City. It is located near the Andhra-Tamil Nadu state border. Gudipala mandal headquarters is 20 km far from Vellore And 12 km far from Chittoor. In 2012 some gram panchayats of Gudipala Mandal were added to Chittoor Municipal Corporation (CHUDA).

Both public and private transport are available. Many educational institutions were there around the mandal. Private Town buses run from Chittoor to Pillarikuppam via Gudipala. Gudipala is a suburb of Chittoor.
