= Palamaner =

- Town
- Location in Andhra Pradesh, India
- Coordinates: 13.2000°N 78.7500°E
- Country: India
- State: Andhra Pradesh
- District: Chittoor
- Mandal: Palamaner

Government
  - Type: Municipality
  - Body: Palamaner Municipality, PKMUDA

Area
  - Total: 17.69 km^{2} (6.83 sq mi)

Population (2011)
  - Total: 54,035
  - Density: 3,055/km^{2} (7,911/sq mi)

Languages
  - Official: Telugu
- Time zone: UTC+5:30 (IST)
- PIN: 517408
- Telephone code: +91–8579
- Vehicle registration: AP–39
- Website: Palamaner Municipality

Palamaner or Palamaneru is a town in Chittoor district of the Indian state of Andhra Pradesh. It is the mandal headquarters of Palamaner mandal and Palamaner Revenue Division

== Geography ==
Palamaner is located in Chittoor District, Andhra Pradesh at 13.2000°N 78.7500°E. It has an average elevation of 683 meters (2,244 ft). Being close to Karnataka and Tamil Nadu state borders, people here bear a mixed culture.

== Education ==
The primary and secondary school education is imparted by government, aided and private schools, under the School Education Department of the state.

== Politics ==
Palamaner is an Assembly constituency in Andhra Pradesh.
