= Chittoor =

- City
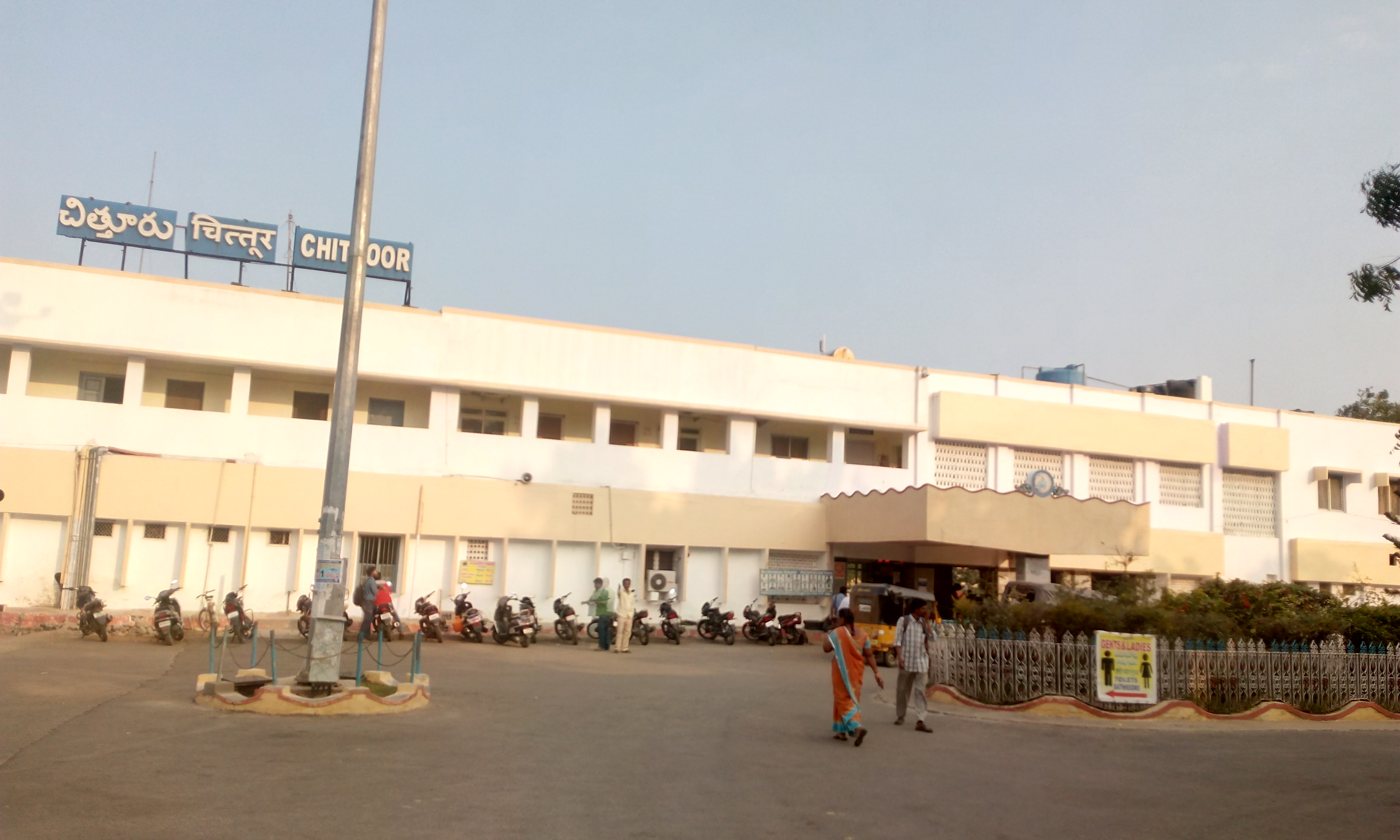
- Chittoor railway station
- Interactive map of Chittoor
- Location within Andhra Pradesh Location within India
- Coordinates: 13.216°N 79.098°E
- Country: India
- State: Andhra Pradesh
- Region: Rayalaseema
- District: Chittoor
- Municipality: 1917
- Municipal corporation: 2012

Government
  - Type: Mayor-Council
  - Body: Chittoor Municipal Corporation (CMC), Chittoor Urban Development Authority(CHUDA)
  - Mayor: Vacant (since 18 March 2026)

Area
  - City: 95.97 km^{2} (37.05 sq mi)
  - Urban: 46.02 km^{2} (17.77 sq mi)
  - Rank: 7th (Andhra Pradesh)
- Elevation: 333.75 m (1,095.0 ft)

Population (2011)
  - City: 189,332
  - Rank: 20th (Andhra Pradesh) 233 (India)
  - Density: 1,973/km^{2} (5,110/sq mi)
  - Urban: 175,647
  - Urban density: 3,817/km^{2} (9,885/sq mi)
- Demonym: Chitoorian

Languages
  - Official: Telugu
  - Regional: Telugu, Tamil
- Time zone: UTC+5:30 (IST)
- PIN: 517001, Complete Post office List
- Area code: +91–08572
- Vehicle registration: AP–03, AP-39
- Nominal GDP(2023-24): ₹6,191 crore (equivalent to ₹66 billion or US$680 million in 2026)
- Contribution to State as a % of GDP: 0.43%
- GDP(PPP)(2023-24): US$3.1billion
- Website: Official website

Chittoor is a city and district headquarters in Chittoor district of the Indian state of Andhra Pradesh. It is also the mandal and divisional headquarters of Chittoor mandal and Chittoor revenue division respectively. The city has a population of 189,332.

== Etymology ==
The name Chittoor is believed to have originated from a combination of two words: Chitti and Ooru. In Telugu, Chitti means "small" and Ooru means "town" or "village." Thus, Chittoor translates to "small town" or "small village".

Historical records show that Chittoor, due to its strategic location, developed as a trading hub between Telugu and Tamil regions, leading to the use of both languages in the town.

== History ==
After Indian independence in 1947, Chittoor became a part of the erstwhile Madras State. The modern Chittoor district was formerly North Arcot district, which was established by the British in the 19th century and had Chittoor as its headquarters. On 1 April 1911, the district was split into two - Chittoor district and North Arcot district.

=== Pre-history ===
The district abounds in several pre-historic sites. The surface finds discovered are assigned to special stages in the progress of civilization. Paleolithic tools were discovered at Tirupathi, Sitarampeta, Ellampalle, Mekalavandlapalle and Piler. Mesolithic tools were discovered at Chinthaparthi, Moratavandlapalle, Aruvandlapalle and Tirupathi.Remains of Neolithic and ancient tools were unearthed near Bangarupalem. The existence of megalithic culture was revealed by the discovery of graves at Irulabanda, Bapanatham, Valimikipuram (Vayalpadu), Sodum, Velkuru, Nyakaneri and Basinikonda.

=== Political history ===
The political history of the district commences with the Mauryas in the 4th century BC. The district of Chittoor was not a homogeneous administrative unit up to 1911. Its component parts were under the control of various principal dynasties at different periods of times, namely,

- the Mauryas,
- Satavahanas,
- Pallavas,
- Chalukyas of Badami,
- Rashtrakutas,
- Cholas,
- Pandyas,
- Kakatiyas,
- Hoysalas,
- Royal of Vijayanagara,
- Qutub Shahis,
- Mughals,
- Asof Jahis,
- Marathas,
- Hyder Ali and
- Tipu of Mysore, and
- the British,

besides dynasties such as

- Banas,
- Vaidumbas,
- Nolambas,
- Western Gangas,
- Yadavas,
- Matlis,
- Andiyaman,
- Siyaganga rulers,
- Nawabs of Kadapa and
- Arcot.

The zamindars of

- Karvetinagar,
- Srikalahasthi(Present Tirupati),
- Punganur(Present Annamayya) and
- Kangundhi
- Jerrimadugu

also ruled over this district.

== Geography ==
Chittoor city lies on the banks of Neeva River at the southernmost part of Andhra Pradesh state. It is located on the NH 69 and NH 40 linking major metropolitan cities of Bangalore and Chennai. This district headquarters is 150 km from Chennai, 165 km from Bangalore.

It is located between the northern latitudes of 37" and 14°8" and between the eastern longitudes 78°33" and 79°55". It is bounded on the east by Tirupati district of Andhra Pradesh, on the south by Krishnagiri District, Vellore, Tiruvallur, Thirupattur districts of Tamil Nadu, on the west by Kolar district of Karnataka, and on the north by Annamayya district of Andhra Pradesh. In respect of area it takes the eighth place with an area of 15,150 square kilometers which accounts for 5.51 percent of the total area of the state. The general elevation of the mountainous part of the district is 2500 feet above sea level. Chennai & Bangalore cities are located in 150 km. and 165 km. respectively from Chittoor Town. Vellore is the nearest city and twin city located 30 kms across the border with Tamil Nadu.

== Climate ==
Climate data for Chittoor, Andhra Pradesh
Month	Jan	Feb	Mar	Apr	May	Jun	Jul	Aug	Sep	Oct	Nov	Dec	Year
Mean daily maximum °C (°F)	28.9 (84.0)	31.4 (88.5)	34.4 (93.9)	36.4 (97.5)	40.0 (104.0)	35.5 (95.9)	33.5 (92.3)	33.3 (91.9)	32.8 (91.0)	31.1 (88.0)	28.8 (83.8)	27.6 (81.7)	32.8 (91.0)
Mean daily minimum °C (°F)	17.7 (63.9)	18.8 (65.8)	21.2 (70.2)	24.5 (76.1)	26.2 (79.2)	25.7 (78.3)	24.6 (76.3)	24.4 (75.9)	23.8 (74.8)	22.5 (72.5)	20.2 (68.4)	18.1 (64.6)	22.3 (72.2)
Average rainfall mm (inches)	6 (0.2)	6 (0.2)	8 (0.3)	24 (0.9)	58 (2.3)	72 (2.8)	102 (4.0)	115 (4.5)	145 (5.7)	162 (6.4)	110 (4.3)	54 (2.1)	862 (33.7)
Source: Climate-Data.org

== Demographics ==
Telugu is the official and most widely spoken language. Chittoor has a population of 212,816 and has a sex ratio of 1,002 females per 1,000 males compared to the state average of 992 females, as of 2011 census. The literacy rate of the city is 90.60%. Chittoor was upgraded to municipal corporation in 2011. A large minority of Tamil people also live here.

Languages of Chittoor city based on 2011 Census
1. Telugu (53.0%)
2. Tamil (34.9%)
3. Urdu (10.8%)
4. Hindi (0.42%)
5. Others (0.81%)

== Governance ==
Chittoor Municipal Corporation is the civic administrative body of the city. It was constituted as a Grade–III municipality in the year 1917. It was upgraded to Grade–II in 1950, Grade–I in 1965, Special Grade in 1980 and Selection Grade in 2000. On 7 July 2012, it was upgraded to municipal corporation by merging 14 gram panchayats into the corporation and is spread over an area of 69.75 km^{2} (26.93 sq mi).

== Economy ==
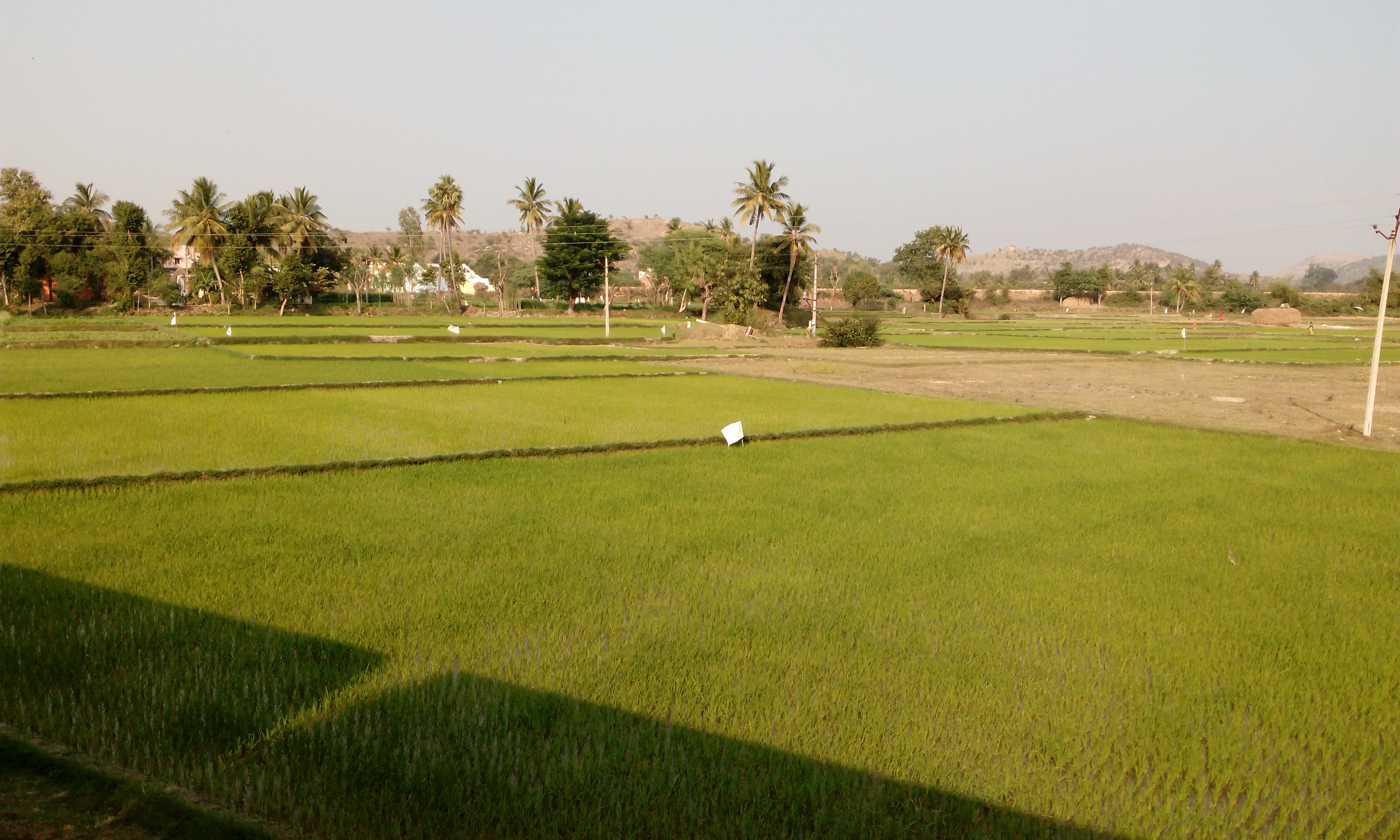
Agriculture near Chittoor

Chittoor is the district headquarters and houses many district level government institutions.

== Landmarks ==
The Swayambu Varasidhi Vinayakaswamy temple at Kanipakam is a famous Hindu temple near the city. Ardhagiri Anjaneyaswamy temple at Aragonda is another notable landmark near the city.

== Regional festivals ==
Chittoor district is known for several local cultural festivals celebrated on a grand scale.

- Chittoor Gangamma Jatara: This annual festival commemorates the killing of a vassal by the goddess Gangamma. The festival is marked by traditional rituals and large-scale community participation in Chittoor.
- Kanuma festival: Celebrated during Sankranti, this festival features decorated bulls paraded through the streets. In some areas, the bulls are also chased as part of traditional customs.

== Education ==
The primary and secondary school education is imparted by government, aided and private schools of the School Education Department of the state. The medium of instruction followed by different schools are English and Telugu.

PCR High school is the oldest school in the city. It was established in 1854 by British.

Engineering colleges:

- Sri Venkateswara College of Engineering Technology, Chittoor
- SITAMS: Sreenivasa Institute of Technology and Management Studies

Medical colleges:

- P.E.S. Institute of Medical Sciences and Research
- Apollo Institute of Medical Sciences and Research
- KKC Homoeopathic Medical College

== Transport ==
=== Roadways ===
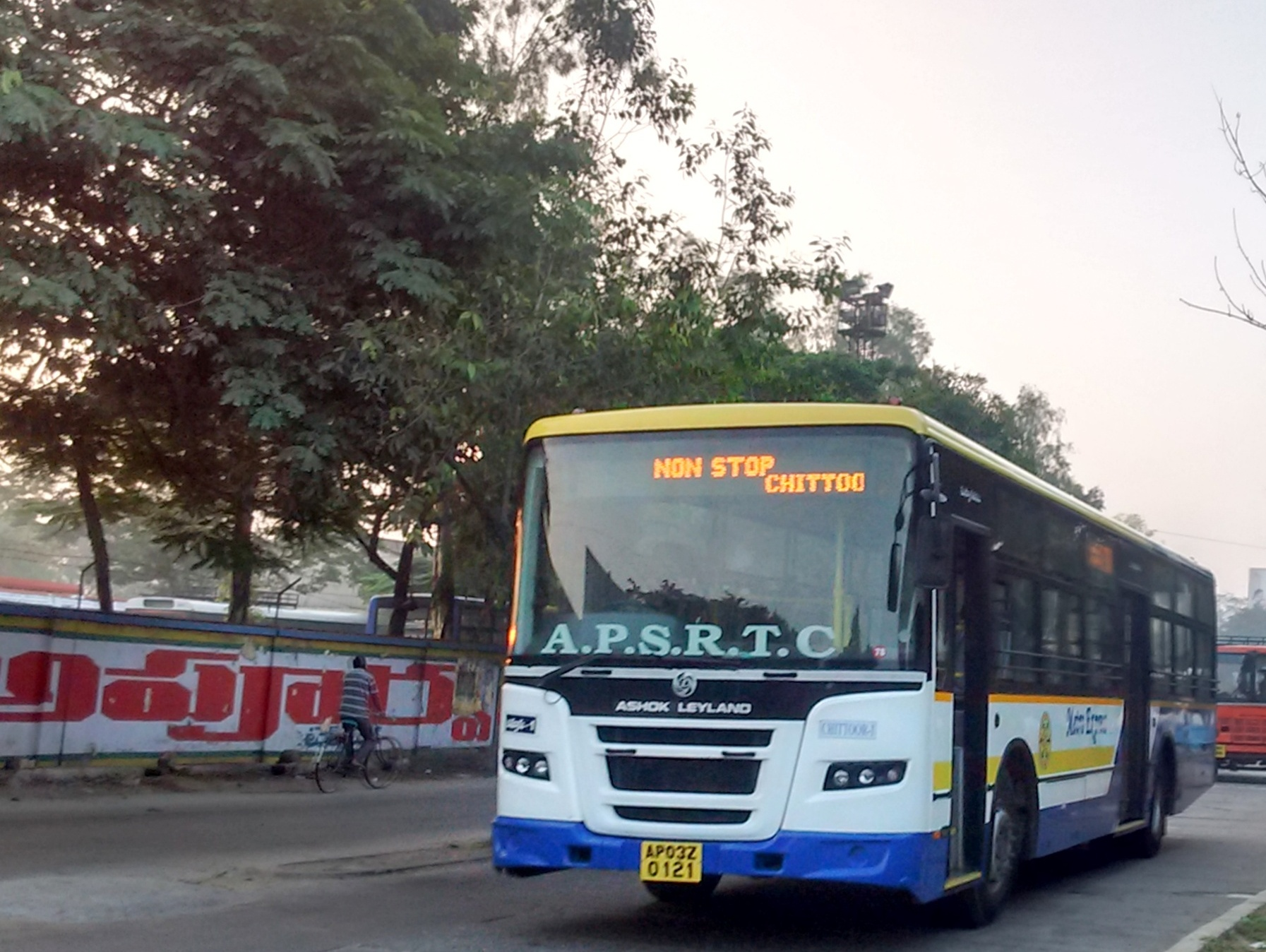
APS RTC bus on Chittoor Roads

The city is well connected to major cities through national and state highways. The National Highways through Chittoor City are, National Highway 40 (India) connecting Chittoor with Kadapa and Kurnool on North and connecting Vellore, Ranipet and Chennai on South National Highway 69 (India) connecting Chittoor with Kolar and Bangalore on West National Highway 140 (India) connecting Chittoor with Tirupati and Nellore on East. The city has total road length of 382.30 km.

=== Public transport ===
The Andhra Pradesh State Road Transport Corporation operates bus services from Chittoor bus station. Bus services are operated to Kuppam, Kanipakam, Tirupati, Madanapalle, Punganur, Palamaner, Piler, Pakala, Puttur, Srikalahasti, Nellore, Vellore, Ranipet, Tiruvannamalai, Salem, Kanchipuram, Chennai, Puducherry, Kolar, Bangalore, Mysore, Kurnool, Kadapa, Anantapur, Hyderabad, Hanumakonda, Warangal, Visakhapatnam, Rajamahendravaram, Kakinada, Vijayawada, Guntur, Tenali, Ongole Amaravati and also to all other major towns and cities in the Chittoor district, Andhra Pradesh, Tamilnadu, Karnataka, Puducherry and Telangana states.

=== Railways ===
Chittoor railway station is a National railway station in Chittoor city of Andhra Pradesh. It lies on Gudur–Katpadi branch line section and is administered under Guntakal railway division of South Central Railway zone. Nearest major railway junction is Katpadi Junction railway station in Vellore City Tamil Nadu. Just 30 km South from Chittoor city. There are direct trains daily from Chittoor to Vijayawada, Kakinada, Rajamahendravaram, Guntur, Tenali, Visakhapatnam, Kacheguda (Hyderabad), Bengaluru, Mysuru, Thiruvananthapuram, New Delhi to Kanyakumari HimSagar Express and weekly/biweekly/triweekly trains connect Chittoor with Mannargudi, Jammu, Katra, Tirunelveli, Mangalore, Ernakulam, Visakhapatnam, Rajamahendravaram, Hatia Ranchi, Santragachi (Kolkata) and Jayanthi Janata Express, etc. which run through Chittoor.

=== Airports ===
The nearest airports are:

1. Tirupati Airport at Tirupati is about 80 kms North. Tirupati Airport is at par with other major cities, but flights are operated in a limited fashion.
2. Chennai International Airport (IATA:MAA) at Chennai is about 150 kms east
3. Kempegowda International Airport (IATA:BLR) at Bangalore is about 185 kms west
4. Kuppam Airport.

The Infrastructure Corporation of Andhra Pradesh Limited (INCAP) will build Kuppam Airport at Shantipuram Mandal at an estimated cost of Rs 100 crore.

== Politics ==
Chittoor city spreads over Chittoor assembly (Majority), Puthalapattu assembly (partially) and Gangadhara Nellore assembly (partially) constituencies in Andhra Pradesh. Chittoor is part of Chittoor (Lok Sabha constituency).

== Notable people ==
- N. Chandrababu Naidu –Chief Minister, Chief of TDP
- Mohan Babu – Actor
- Nallari Kiran Kumar Reddy – Ex Chief Minister
- Talari Manohar – Member of Parliament, Member of Legislative Assembly.
- V. Nagayya – actor
- D. K. Adikesavulu Naidu – Ex MP, Ex Chairman TTD, Founder Vydehi Hospitals, Liquor Baron
- Chittoor Subramaniam Pillai – Carnatic musician
- Madhurantakam Rajaram – writer, Sahitya Akademi awardee
- Cattamanchi Ramalinga Reddy – educationist and political thinker, essayist and economist, poet and literary critic.
- Dr. Kesava Reddy – Novelist
- Prathap C. Reddy – founder and chairman of the Apollo group of hospitals
- P. Chinnamma Reddy was a prominent politician in the Chittoor district, Andhra Pradesh, India until the 1960s.

== See also ==
- List of cities in Andhra Pradesh by population
- List of municipal corporations in Andhra Pradesh
