= Chittoor district =

District of Andhra Pradesh, India

- District of Andhra Pradesh
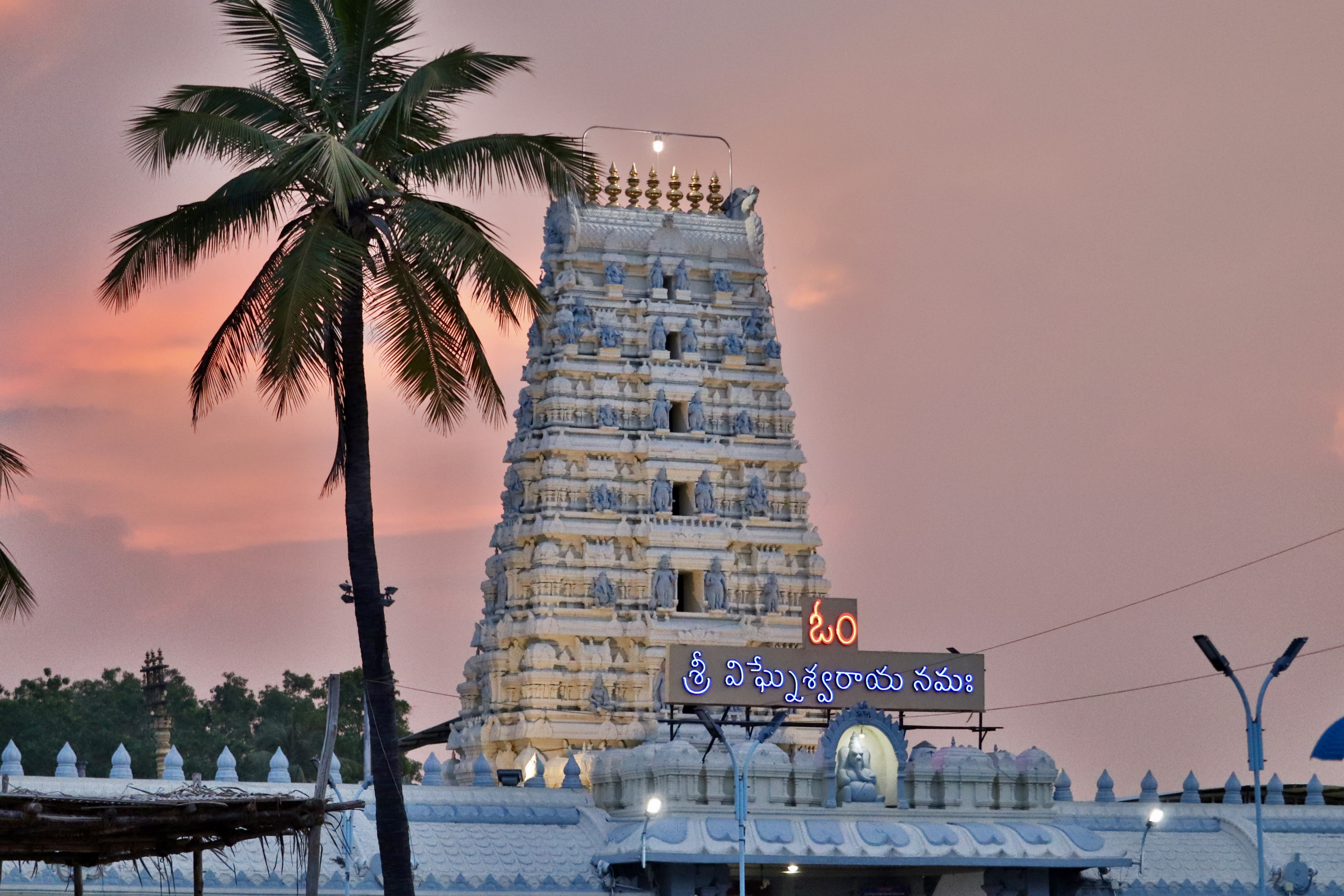
- Galigopuram of Vinayaka Temple, Kanipakam

- Location of Chittoor district in Andhra Pradesh
- Interactive map of Chittoor district
- Coordinates: 13.216°N 79.097°E
- Country: India
- State: Andhra Pradesh
- Region: Rayalaseema
- Formed: 1 April 1911
- Reorganized: 4 April 2022
- Headquarters: Chittoor
- Largest City: Chittoor

Government
  - District collector: Sumith kumar, IAS
  - SP: Tushar Dudi, IPS
  - Lok Sabha: Lok Sabha List: Chittoor
  - Assembly: Assembly List: Chittoor (SC); Gangadhara Nellore (SC); Kuppam; Nagari; Palamaner; Puthalapattu (SC)

Area
  - Total: 6,855 km^{2} (2,647 sq mi)

Population (2011)
  - Total: 1,872,951
  - Sex ratio: 985 (females per 1,000 males)

Languages
  - Official: Telugu
  - Regional: Telugu - 73.23%; Tamil- 16.75%; Urdu - 8.72%
- Time zone: UTC+5:30 (IST)
- Postal Index Number: 517xxx
- Area codes: +91–8572
- ISO 3166 code: IN-AP
- Vehicle registration: AP-03 (former) AP–39 (from 30 January 2019)
- District LGD code: 503
- District abbreviation: CHI
- GDP (2022-23): ₹40,409 crore (equivalent to ₹440 billion or US$4.7 billion in 2026)
- Per capita income (2022–23): ₹183,089 (equivalent to ₹200,000 or US$2,100 in 2026)
- Website: chittoor.ap.gov.in

Chittoor district is one of the eight districts in the Rayalaseema region of the Indian state of Andhra Pradesh. It had a population of 18,72,951 at the 2011 census of India. It is a major market centre for mangoes, grains, sugarcane, and peanuts. The district headquarters is at Chittoor City. The major cities/towns in the district are Chittoor, Nagari, Palamaner, and Kuppam.

== Etymology ==
The district derived its name from its headquarters Chittoor.

== History ==
The modern Chittoor district was formerly North Arcot District, which was established by the British in the 19th century. It had Chittoor as its headquarters. Chittoor district was constituted on 1 April 1911 with the taluks of Chittoor, Palamaner, and Chandragiri from Old North Arcot district of Tamilnadu, Madanapalle and Voyalpadu Taluks of Kadapa district and Ex-Zamindari areas of Pileru, Punganur, Srikalahasthi, Puttur and Old Karvetinagar estate.

After the Indian independence in 1947, Chittoor region became a part of the erstwhile Madras state. As a result of Pataskar Award consequent on the re-organisation of the state on a linguistic basis on 1 April 1960, a major portion of Tiruthani taluk was transferred to Chengalpattu district of Tamilnadu in exchange for one taluk known as Sathyavedu comprising 186 villages from Tamilnadu. Also from the same date, 220 villages from Palamaner Taluk and three villages from Krishnagiri Taluk of Salem District of Tamilnadu were transferred to form Kuppam Sub-Taluk and 145 villages from Chittoor Taluk were transferred to form Bangarupalem Sub-Taluk. Subsequently, Kuppam and Bangarupalem were made full-fledged taluks. The district was organised into 66 revenue mandals in 1985. Again the District Re-organised with 31 Mandals and 4 Revenue Divisions on 4 April 2022.

Annamayya district and Tirupati district were formed from parts of the erstwhile Chittoor district and others. This has resulted in the district becoming primarily rural and losing central educational institutes and health infrastructure.

=== Demographics ===
Historical population
Year	Pop.	±% p.a.
1901	1,118,706	—
1911	1,171,614	+0.46%
1921	1,203,748	+0.27%
1931	1,324,770	+0.96%
1941	1,490,095	+1.18%
1951	1,657,560	+1.07%
1961	1,905,344	+1.40%
1971	2,267,413	+1.75%
1981	2,737,316	+1.90%
1991	3,261,118	+1.77%
2001	3,745,875	+1.40%
2011	4,174,064	+1.09%

According to the 2011 census, Chittoor district prior to restructuring in 2022 had a population of 4,174,064. This gives it a ranking of 47th in India (out of a total of 640) and 6th in its state. The district has a population density of 275 inhabitants per square kilometre (710/sq mi). Its population growth rate over the decade 2001–2011 was 11.33%. Chittoor has a sex ratio of 1002 females for every 1000 males, and a literacy rate of 72.36%.

=== Economy ===
The Gross District Domestic Product (GDDP) of the undivided district for FY 2013-14 is ₹34,742 crore (US$3.7 billion) and it contributes 6.6% to the Gross State Domestic Product (GSDP). For the FY 2013–14, the per capita income at current prices was ₹64,671 (US$690). The primary, secondary and tertiary sectors of the district contribute ₹8,226 crore (US$880 million), and ₹18,849 crore (US$2.0 billion) respectively. The major products contributing to the GVA of the district from agriculture and allied services are, sugarcane, groundnut, tomato, mango, milk, meat and fisheries. The GVA to the industrial and service sector is contributed from construction, electricity, manufacturing, education and ownership of dwellings.

=== Hydrology and climate ===
The important rivers in the district before restructuring were Ponnai and Swarnamukhi, which originate in the Eastern Ghats. Other rivers include Araniyar, Bahuda, Beema, Cheyyeru, Kalangi, Kalyani, Koundinya, Kusasthali, Neeva, Papaghni, Pileru, Pincha, and Pedderu. None of the rivers are perennial.

The temperature in the western parts of the undivided district like Pileru, Punganur, Madanapalle, Horsley Hills are relatively lower than the eastern parts of the Chittoor District. This is because of the higher altitude of the western parts compared to the eastern parts. The summer temperature touches 44 °C in the eastern parts whereas in the western parts, it ranges around 36 ° to 38 °C. Similarly, the winter temperatures of the western parts are relatively low ranging from 12 °C to 14 °C, and in eastern parts it is 16 °C to 18 °C. Most of the district has a Tropical wet and dry climate, with some north-western parts having Hot semi-arid climate.

Undivided Chittoor district receives an annual rainfall of 918.1 mm. The South West Monsoon and North East Monsoon are the major sources of rainfall for the district. On average the district receives 438.0 mm of rainfall through the South West Monsoon (From June to September) and 396.0 mm from North East Monsoon (From October to December). The rainfall received by the district in the years 2002 and 2003 were 984.2 mm and 934 mm respectively.

== Geography ==
Chittoor is a part of Rayalaseema region of Andhra Pradesh. The district occupies an area of 6,855 square kilometres (2,647 sq mi). This district is also under Tondai Nadu Region. The district is bounded by Annamayya district to the North, Krishnagiri District, Tirupattur District, Vellore District and Tiruvallur District of Tamil Nadu state to the South, Tirupati district to the East & North, Kolar District of Karnataka state to the West.

The district is located between the northern latitudes of 12°-44’-42″ and 13°-39’-21″ and between the eastern longitudes 78°-2’-2″ and 79°-41’-52″. Chittoor, the district headquarters is 150 km from Chennai, 165 km from Bangalore.

== Climate ==
Chitoor has been ranked 21st best “National Clean Air City” under (Category 3 population under 3 lakhs cities) in India.

== Demographics ==
Religions in Chittoor district based on 2011 Census
Religion	Percent
Hinduism	91.05%
Islam	8.06%
Christianity	0.54%
Other or not stated	0.35%
Distribution of religions

After reorganisation in 2025, the district had a population of 1,643,224, of which 313,898 (19.10%) lived in urban areas. Chittoor district has a sex ratio of 993 females per 1000 males. Scheduled Castes and Scheduled Tribes made up 361,461 (22.00%) and 44,367 (2.70%) of the population respectively.

Languages of Chittoor district based on 2011 Census
1. Telugu (72.08%)
2. Tamil (19.01%)
3. Urdu (7.72%)
4. Others (1.19%)

Based on the 2011 census, 72.08% of the population spoke Telugu, 19.02% Tamil and 7.72% Urdu as their first language. Telugu is the primary official language of the district along with English. Tamil is widely spoken in the border areas, especially in Kuppam.

== Administrative divisions ==
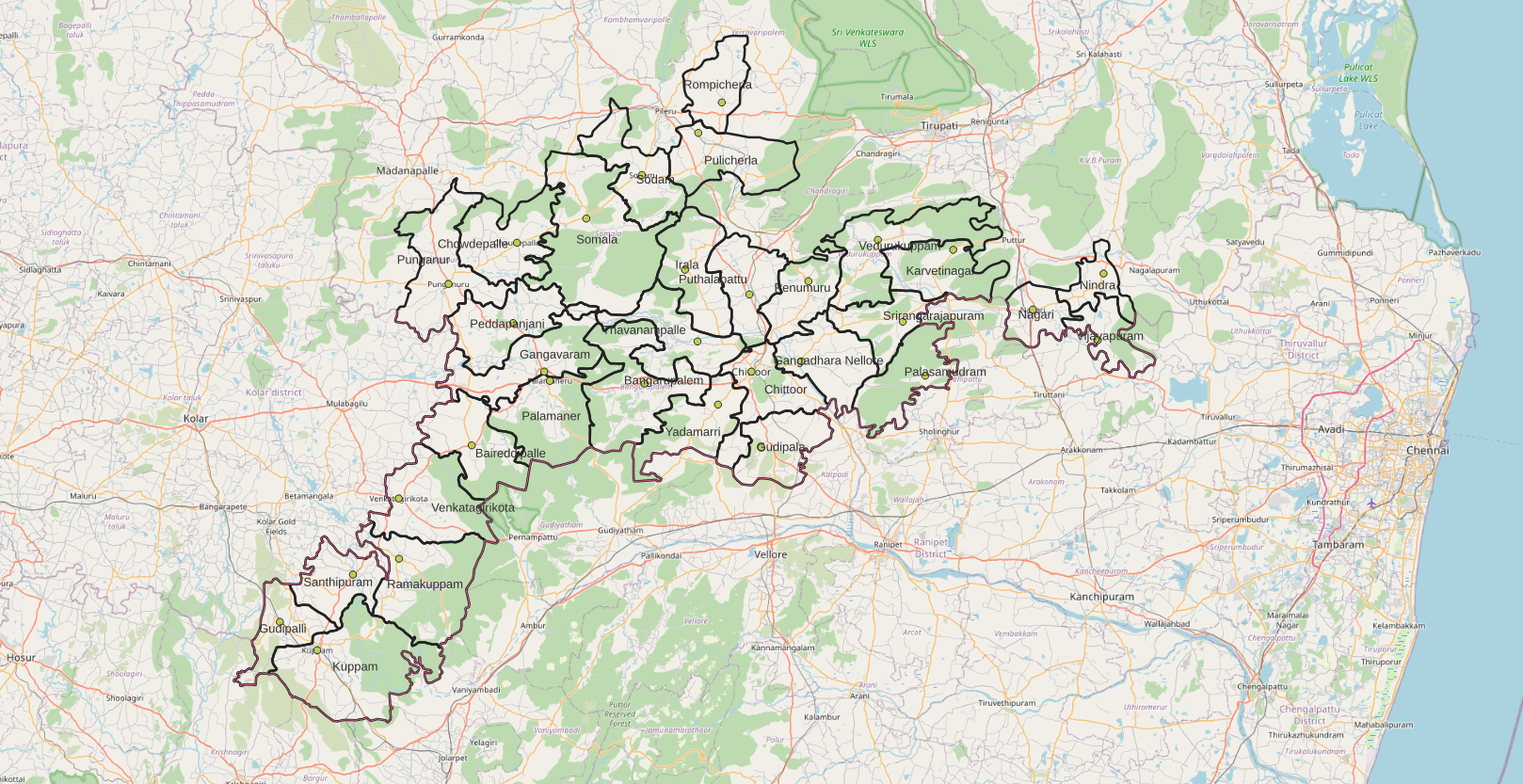
Map of the Chittoor district

The district is divided into four revenue divisions: Chittoor, Kuppam, Nagari and Palamaner, which are further subdivided into a total of 28 mandals, each headed by a sub-collector.

=== Mandals ===
The list of 28 mandals in Chittoor district, is given below.

1. Chittoor revenue division
  1. Bangarupalyam
  2. Chittoor Rural
  3. Chittoor Urban
  4. Gangadhara Nellore
  5. Gudipala
  6. Irala
  7. Penumuru
  8. Pulicherla
  9. Puthalapattu
  10. Rompicherla
  11. Srirangarajapuram
  12. Thavanampalle
  13. Vedurukuppam
  14. Yadamari
2. Kuppam revenue division
  1. Gudupalle
  2. Kuppam
  3. Ramakuppam
  4. Santhipuram
3. Nagari revenue division
  1. Karvetinagar
  2. Nagari
  3. Nindra
  4. Palasamudram
  5. Vijayapuram
4. Palamaner revenue division
  1. Baireddipalle
  2. Gangavaram
  3. Palamaner
  4. Peddapanjani
  5. Venkatagirikota

== Cities and towns ==
Chittoor is a Municipal Corporation, while Kuppam, Palamaner and Nagari are municipalities.

Municipal Bodies in Chittoor District
Ciy/Town	Civil status	Revenue Division	Population (2011)
Chittoor	Municipal Corporation	Chittoor	175,647
Nagari	Municipality Grade 3	Nagari	62,253
Palamaner	Municipality Grade 3	Palamaner	54,035
Kuppam	Municipality Grade 3	Kuppam	39,000

== Villages ==
- Bandarlapalle
- Govindareddipalle
- Kaliambakam
- Kollagunta
- Marrimakula Kandriga
- Pachikapalam
- Panatoor
- Yerrathivaripalli

== Politics ==
There are two parliamentary and seven assembly constituencies located in this district. The parliamentary constituencies are Chittoor (Lok Sabha constituency) and Rajampet Lok Sabha constituency(partial). The assembly constituencies are given below.

Constituency number	Assembly constituency	Reserved for (SC/ST/None)	Parliamentary constituency
165	Punganur (partial)	None	Rajampet
170	Nagari (partial)	None	Chittoor
171	Gangadhara Nellore	SC	Chittoor
172	Chittoor	None	Chittoor
173	Puthalapattu	SC	Chittoor
174	Palamaner	None	Chittoor
175	Kuppam	None	Chittoor

== Economy ==
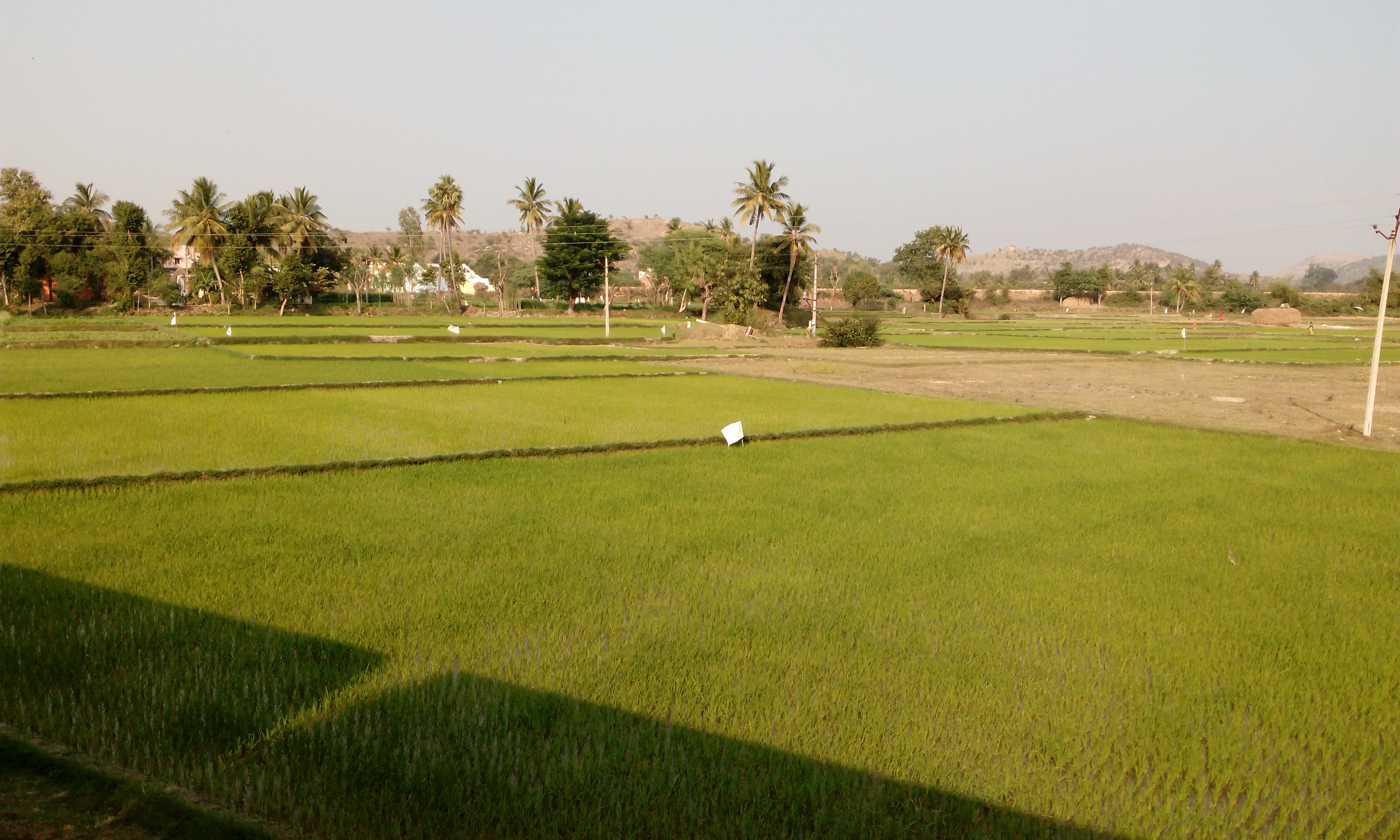
Agriculture near Chittor

Agriculture and horticulture are the mainstays of the district's economy.

== Transport ==
=== Roadways ===
NH 69 and NH 40 pass through the district. Six lane expressway connecting Tirupati and Bangalore via Chittoor is operational. NH 42, a two lane Highway from Anantapur-Kuppam-Krishnagiri passes through the District.

=== Railways ===
Chittoor District has two major railway stations.

- Chittoor railway station on the Gudur-Katpadi line
- Kuppam railway station on the Bangalore–Chennai main line

=== Airports ===
Nearest airports

Tirupati Airport at a distance of 86Km from Chittoor

Kuppam Airport at a distance of 120Km from Chittoor

== Education ==
Dravidian University is the only university in the district after the reorganisation.

== Notable sites ==
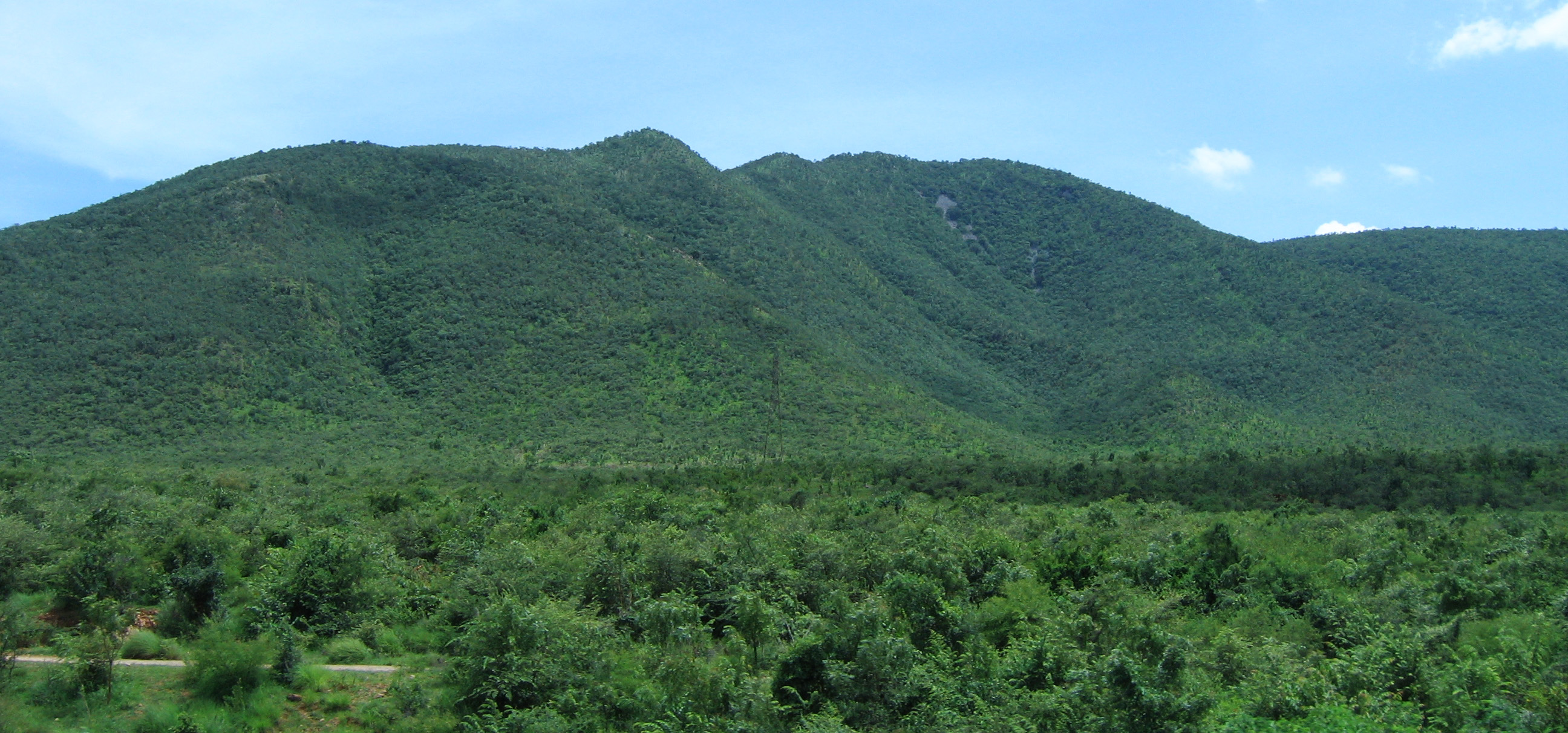
Koundinya Wildlife Sanctuary

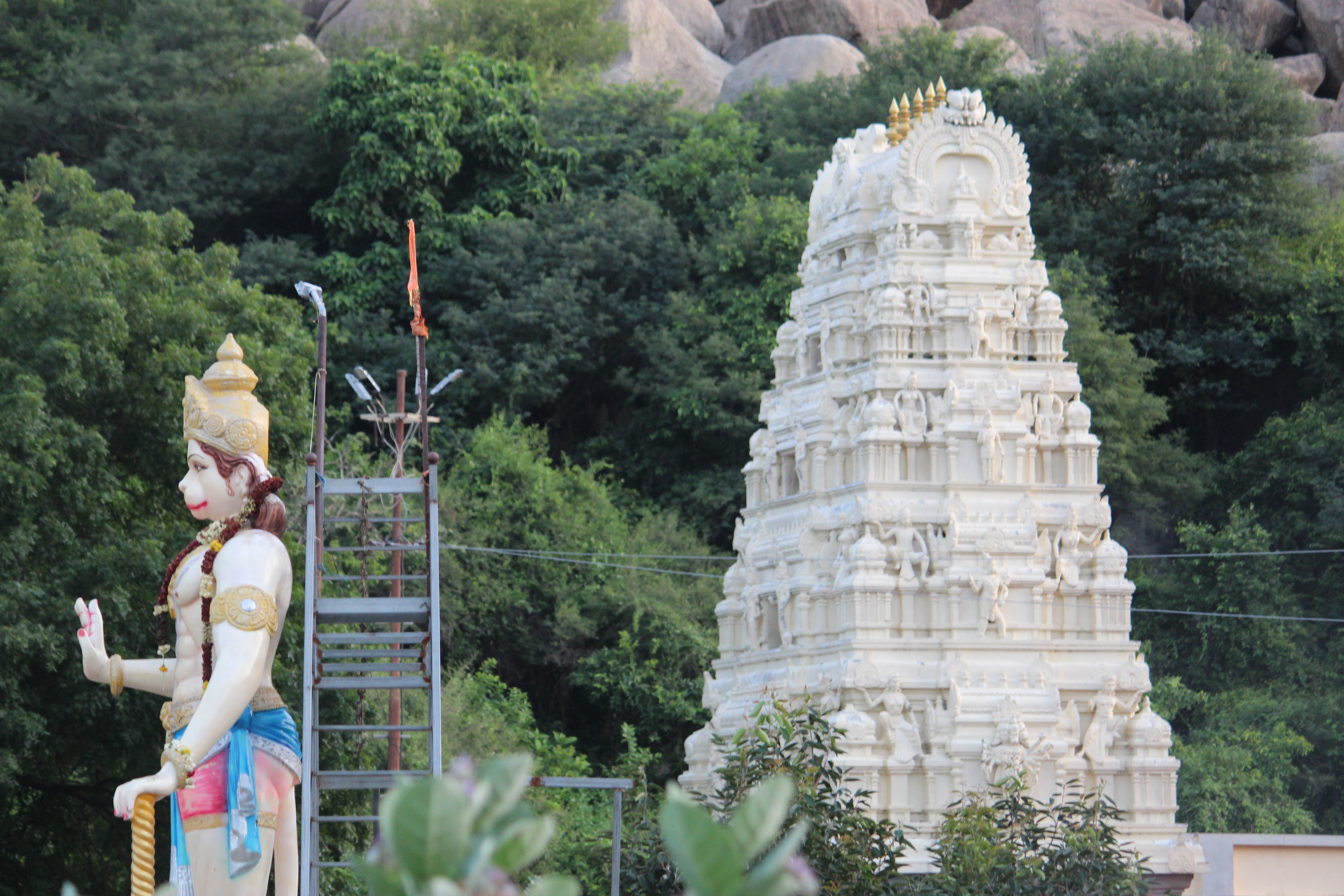
Veeranjaneya Temple, Ardhagiri

- Vinayaka Temple, Kanipakam: at a distance of 11Km from Chittoor, 11th century temple dedicated to Lord Ganesh in Kanipakam.
- Kaigal Water Falls: at a distance of 28 km from Palamaner, water falls from a height of 40 feet in all seasons
- Koundinya Wildlife Sanctuary: located at a distance of 50 km from Chittoor, spread over 358 SqKm, elephant, cheetah, four horned antelope and other wildlife can be seen here.
- Veeranjaneya Temple, Ardhagiri: at a distance of 27 km from Chittoor, this place is related to the mythological story of Lord Hanuman, as the place where the half of the Sanjeevani mountain that he was carrying fell.

== Notable people ==
V. Nagayya, also known as Chittoor Nagayya, was brought up in Kuppam. He was a pioneering Indian actor, singer, music composer, and director in the Telugu and Tamil film industry.

Cattamanchi Ramalinga Reddy was born in Kattamanchi, a suburb of Chittoor. He was an educationist, economist, poet and literary critic.

Prathap Chandra Reddy, born in Aragonda, is a cardiologist who founded the first corporate chain of hospitals in India, the Apollo Hospitals.
