= Tirupati (disambiguation) =

Tirupati (Sripati in Sanskrit) is a major pilgrimage city in Tirupati district of Andhra Pradesh, India.

Tirupati may also refer to:

== Andhra Pradesh, India ==
- Tirupati district, a district in the state of Andhra Pradesh
- Tirupati Temple, Vishnu temple in Tirupati
- Tirupati Municipal Corporation, the civic body that governs the city of Tirupati
- Tirupati Urban Development Authority, the planning authority for Tirupati district
- Tirupati revenue division, in Tirupati district
- Tirupati (Assembly constituency)
- Tirupati (Lok Sabha constituency)
- Tirupati (urban) mandal, in Tirupati district
- Tirupati (rural) mandal, in Tirupati district
- Tirupati (NMA), a census town in Tirupati district
- Tirupati Airport
- Tirumala Tirupati Devasthanams, the trust which manages Tirupati Temple

== People with the surname ==
- Shashaa Tirupati (born 1989), an Indian-Canadian playback singer, songwriter, and music producer

== Other uses ==
- Vishnu, major Hindu deity, also known as Tirupati or Sripati
  - Krishna, an avatar of Vishnu also known by the epithets
- Thirupathi (2006 Tamil film), a Tamil language film written and directed by Perarasu
- Thirupathi (2006 Kannada film), a Kannada film directed by Shivamani

== See also ==
- Tirumalai (disambiguation)
- Sreepathi Rao Peta, a village in Andhra Pradesh, India
- Shreepati Arcade, a building in Mumbai, India
- Śrīpati (1019–1066), an Indian mathematician and astronomer
- Sripathi Balasubrahmanyam or S. P. Balasubrahmanyam (1946–2020), an Indian singer, son of Kodandapani
- Sripati Chandrasekhar, an Indian demographer, economist, sociologist and scholar
- Sripati Mishra (1923–2002), an Indian politician, former chief minister of Uttar Pradesh
- Sripati Panditharadhyula Kodandapani or S. P. Kodandapani, Indian musician
- Sripathi Panditaradhyula Sailaja or S. P. Sailaja (born 1962), an Indian singer, daughter of Kodandapani
- Sripathi Rajeshwar Rao, an Indian politician
