= Renigunta mandal =

- Mandal
- Interactive map of Renigunta mandal
- Location in Andhra Pradesh, India
- Coordinates: 13.65°N 79.52°E
- Country: India
- State: Andhra Pradesh
- District: Tirupati
- Headquarters: Renigunta, Tirupati

Population (2011)
  - Total: 75,789

Languages
  - Official: Telugu
- Time zone: UTC+5:30 (IST)

Renigunta mandal is one of the 36 mandals in Tirupati district of the Indian state of Andhra Pradesh. Its headquarters are located at Renigunta, suburb of Tirupati.. The mandal is bounded by Tirupati (urban), Tirupati (rural), Vadamalapeta, Yerpedu.This mandal is located at Srikalahasti revenue division.

== Demographics ==
As of 2011 census, the mandal had a population of 75,789. The total population constitute, 38,090 males and 37,699 females —a sex ratio of 990 females per 1000 males. 8,365 children are in the age group of 0–6 years, of which 4,276 are boys and 4,089 are girls —a ratio of 956 per 1000. The average literacy rate stands at 76.11% with 51,318 literates.

== Towns and villages ==
As of 2011 census, the mandal has 32 settlements. It includes 1 town and 31 villages. The populated villages in the mandal are in the vicinity of Tirupati city.

The settlements in the mandal are listed below:

1. Adusupalem
2. Ammavaripatteda
3. Anagunta
4. Annasamipalle
5. Athuru
6. Balupalle
7. Dharmapuram Khandriga
8. Elamandyam
9. Erragunta
10. Erramareddipalem
11. Gajulamandyam
12. Jeepalem
13. Karakambadi
14. Kothapalem
15. Kotramangalam
16. Krishnaiah Kalva
17. Krishnapuram
18. Kurukalva
19. Mamandur
20. Molagamudi
21. Nallapalem
22. R. Mallavaram
23. Renigunta
24. Renigunta Agraharam
25. Sanjeevarayanipatteda
26. Srinivasaudasipuram
27. Surappakasam
28. Thandlam
29. Thathaiah Kalva
30. Thukivakam (Rural)
31. Vedullacheruvu
32. Venkatapuram

== See also ==
- List of mandals in Andhra Pradesh
