= Pakala, Tirupati district =

Pakala
- Town
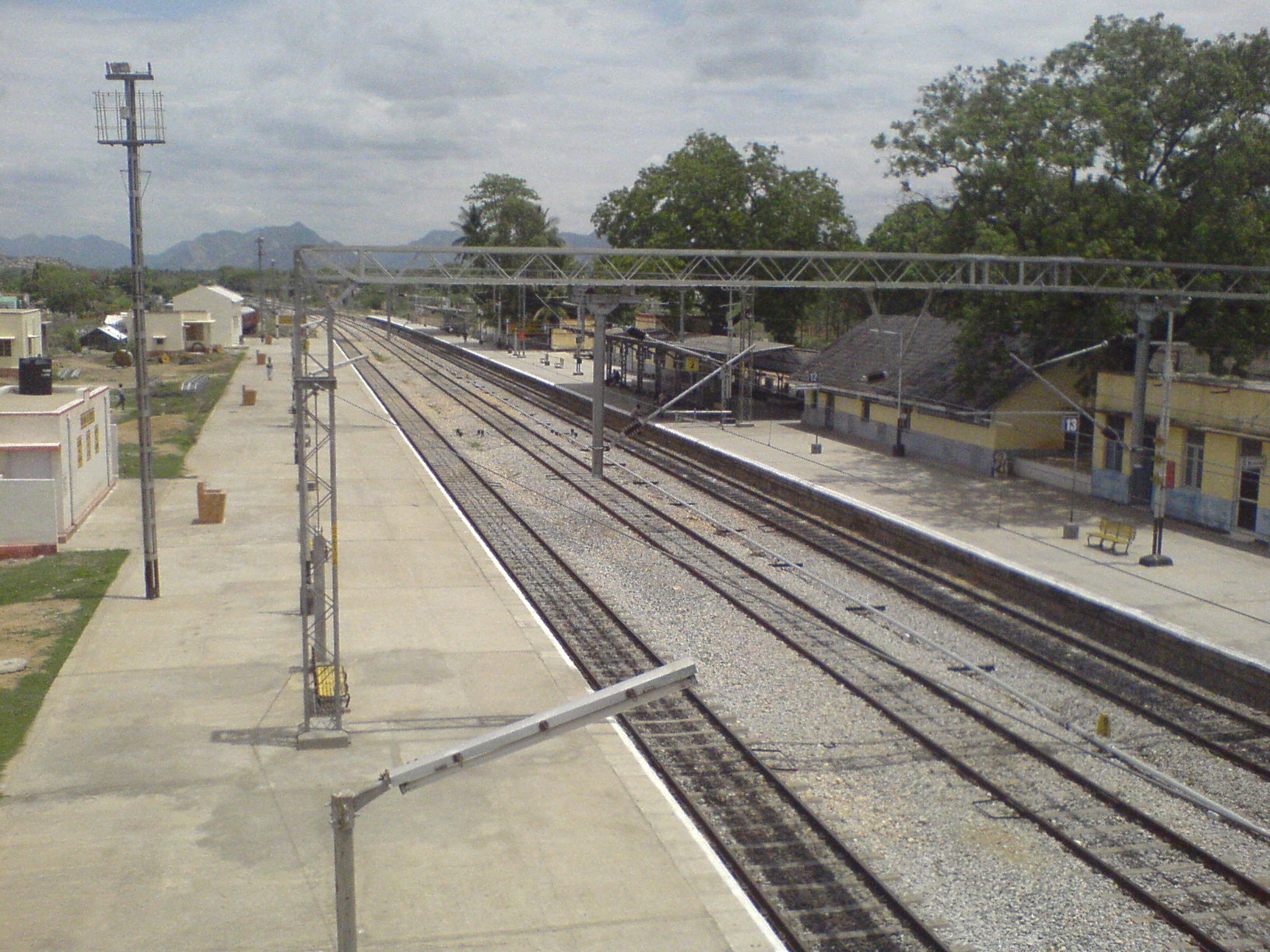
- Pakala railway station view from foot overbridge

- Location in Andhra Pradesh, India Pakala (India)
- Coordinates: 13.4667°N 79.1167°E
- Country: India
- State: Andhra Pradesh
- District: Tirupati
- Mandal: Pakala
- Elevation: 361 m (1,184 ft)

Population
  - Total: 28,556

Languages
  - Official: Telugu
- Time zone: UTC+5:30 (IST)
- Postal code: 517112
- Telephone code: 918585
- Vehicle registration: AP03 (Before 2019) / AP39 (2019)
- Nearest city: Tirupati
- Sex ratio: 2:1 ♂/♀
- Lok Sabha constituency: Tirupati
- Vidhan Sabha constituency: Chandragiri

Pakala is a town in Tirupati district of the Indian state of Andhra Pradesh. It is the mandal headquarters of Pakala mandal. It comes under Tirupati revenue division.

== About ==
Pakala is a mandal in Tirupati district of Andhra Pradesh, India. Pakala Mandal Headquarters is Pakala town. It belongs to Rayalaseema region. It is located 44 km towards West from District headquarters Tirupathi. 450 km from State capital Amaravathi .

Pakala Mandal is bounded by Puthalapattu Mandal towards South, Penumuru Mandal towards South, Pulicherla H/O Reddivaripalle Mandal towards North, Irala Mandal towards west. Chittoor and Tirupati are the nearby cities to Pakala.

Pakala consists of 180 villages and 28 panchayats. Nagamma Agraharam is the smallest village and Pakala is the biggest village. It is in the 371 m elevation (altitude).

Sri Valli Devasena Sametha Kalyana Subramanya Swamy Temple in Pakala (located in the Utlavaripalli village) features a breathtaking 54-foot tall statue of Lord Murugan .Tirumala, Tirupati, Kanipakam, Vellore, Tiruttani, Srikalahasti, Chittoor are the nearby important tourist destinations to see

== Education ==
The primary and secondary school education is imparted by government, aided and private schools, under the School Education Department of the state.[2][3] The medium of instruction followed by different schools are English, Telugu and Urdu.

Colleges

- Govt. Degree College
- Govt. Junior College (boys)
- Govt Junior College (girls)
- Sri Bala Gangadhar Reddy Arts & Science College (SBGR)

Schools

- Govt Secondary High School
- N.V.N (MPP) Primary School
- Infant Jesus English Medium High School
- Sri Vivekananda Vidyanikethan High School
- RCM high School
- Y.v. Rathnam School
- Ushodaya High School

== Demographics ==
Telugu is the official and widely spoken language. Also people speak Urdu, Tamil. Total population of Pakala Mandal is 56,802 living in 13,533 houses, Spread across total 180 villages and 28 panchayats. Males are 28,414 and females are 28,388

== Geography ==
Pakala is located at 13.4667°N 79.1167°E. It has an average elevation of 361 meters (1184 feet).

== Distance ==
- Chittoor 30 km
- Tirupati 43 km
- Tirumala 61 km
- Vellore 66 km
- Punganur 74 km
- Srikalahasti 80 km
- Madanapalle 85 km
- Pileru 32 km
- Chennai 178 km
- Bengaluru 221 km
- Vijayawada 485 km
- Hyderabad 550 km

== Governance ==
Pakala(Chandragiri) is one of the 175 assembly constituencies of Andhra Pradesh Legislative Assembly, India. pakala is part of Chittoor (Lok Sabha constituency). Daggumalla Prasada Rao of Telugu Desam Party is the sitting Member of Parliament for Chittoor (Lok Sabha constituency) and Pulivarthi Nani of Telugu Desam party is Chandragiri the sitting Member of Legislative Assembly for Chandragiri (Assembly constituency).

=== Politics ===
Pakala is an Assembly constituency in Andhra Pradesh and the constituency number is 285.

== Entertainment ==
There are two theaters in pakala town, Ramakrishna Theatre, Srinivas & Mini Theatre

== Transport ==
Roadways

Pakala is well connected to major cities through national and state highways. The National Highways through Pakala Town are, National Highway 40 (India) connecting Pileru, Madanapalli, Kadapa, Kurnool and Hyderabad on North and connecting Chittoor, Vellore and Chennai on South National Highway 69 (India) connecting Chittoor with Kolar and Bangalore on West National Highway 140 (India) connecting Chittoor with Tirupati and Nellore on East. The city has total road length of 382.30 km.

Public transport

The Andhra Pradesh State Road Transport Corporation operates bus services from Tirupati and Chittoor bus stations. Bus services are operated to Tirumala,Tirupati,Kanipakam, Chittoor,Punganur,Pileru, Madanapalli,Palamaner,Srikalahasti,Nellore,Vijayawada, Bengaluru and also to near by major Panchayths and Villages in the Tirupati district , Chittoor district and Annamayya district - Madanapalle in Andhra Pradesh.

Railways Pakala Junction railway station is a major railway station in Pakala Town of Andhra Pradesh. It lies on Gudur–Katpadi branch line section and is administered under Guntakal railway division of South Coastal Railway zone. Nearest major railway stations are

- Tirupati, Andhra Pradesh, 45 km from Pakala Town
- Katpadi Junction, Tamil Nadu, is 70 km from Pakala Town.

Airports

The nearest airports are

- 1 - Tirupati International Airport at Renigunta in Tirupati , Andhra Pradesh
- 2 - Chennai International Airport at Chennai , Tamilnadu
- 3 - Kempegowda International Airport at Bengaluru , Karanataka

== Climate ==
Climate data for Chittoor, Andhra Pradesh
Month	Jan	Feb	Mar	Apr	May	Jun	Jul	Aug	Sep	Oct	Nov	Dec	Year
Mean daily maximum °C (°F)	28.7 (83.7)	31.4 (88.5)	34.4 (93.9)	36.4 (97.5)	40.0 (104.0)	35.5 (95.9)	33.5 (92.3)	33.3 (91.9)	32.8 (91.0)	31.1 (88.0)	28.8 (83.8)	27.6 (81.7)	32.8 (91.0)
Mean daily minimum °C (°F)	17.7 (63.9)	18.8 (65.8)	21.2 (70.2)	24.5 (76.1)	26.2 (79.2)	25.7 (78.3)	24.6 (76.3)	24.4 (75.9)	23.8 (74.8)	22.5 (72.5)	20.2 (68.4)	18.1 (64.6)	22.3 (72.2)
Average rainfall mm (inches)	6 (0.2)	6 (0.2)	8 (0.3)	24 (0.9)	58 (2.3)	72 (2.8)	102 (4.0)	115 (4.5)	145 (5.7)	162 (6.4)	110 (4.3)	54 (2.1)	862 (33.7)
Source: Climate-Data.org

== Landmarks ==
The Swayambu Varasidhi Vinayakaswamy temple at Kanipakam is the famous notable Hindu temple near the city.

The 11th century historical Chandragiri Fort is the notable landmark near the city.

From Pakala Town we have NARL National Atmosphere and Research Laboratory towards Tirupati 5 km from town.
