= Swarnamukhi =

River in Andhra Pradesh, India

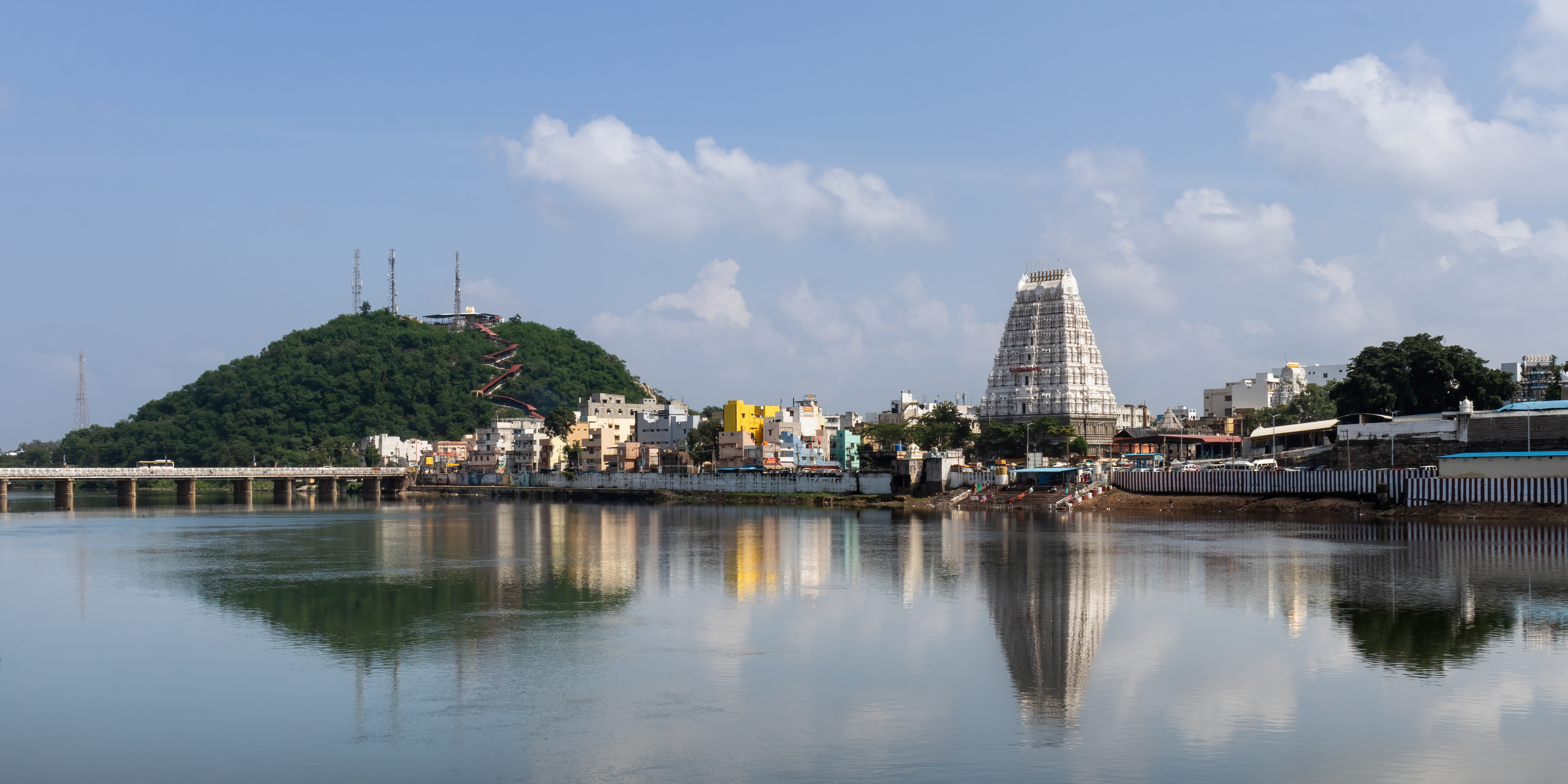
- Swarnamukhi River at Srikalahasti

Location
- Country: India
- State: Andhra Pradesh
- Region: Rayalaseema
- District: Tirupati

Physical characteristics
- Source: Tirupati district, Andhra Pradesh, India
  - elevation: 300m
- Mouth: Bay of Bengal, India
- Length: 130 km (81 mi)
- Basin size: 3,225 km²

Swarnamukhi (Telugu: స్వర్ణముఖి, Sanskrit: स्वर्णमुखी, IAST: Svarṇamukhī, pronounced [sʋɐrɳɐmʊkʰiː]) is an independent east-flowing river in the Indian state of Andhra Pradesh. It originates in the Eastern Ghats near Pakala, Tirupati district, and flows for about 130 km before draining into the Bay of Bengal. Unlike many other rivers of the region, it does not join a major river system and its flow is largely dependent on seasonal rainfall.

The Swarnamukhi basin encompasses two of the most sacred pilgrimage centers in South India — Tirumala, home of the Sri Venkateswara Swami Temple, and Srikalahasti, famed for the Srikalahasteeswara temple — underscoring the river’s deep cultural and religious significance.

== Geography ==
The Swarnamukhi rises at about 300 m above sea level and flows northeast through forested areas, farmlands, and temple towns before reaching the sea. It drains a basin of roughly 3,225 km².

Annual rainfall is uneven: around 1,270 mm in the eastern basin, tapering to 762 mm in the west. The river is non-perennial and highly seasonal.

== Cultural significance ==
The basin is home to several of South India’s most revered pilgrimage centers:

- Tirumala, where the Sri Venkateswara Temple is located.
- Srikalahasti, home to the Srikalahasteeswara temple, dedicated to Shiva and often called Dakshina Kailasam.
- Swarnamukhi Shila (also known as Ambika Shila or Devi Shila) is a sacred natural stone found in the Swarnamukhi River, used to represent Goddess Parvati (Ambika/Durga) in Hindu rituals. It plays a critical role in the traditional Smarta Panchayatana puja by Adi Shankara, where five different natural stones representing five main deities are worshipped together

The poet Dhurjati referred to the river as Mogaleru in his works.

== Infrastructure ==
The Kalyani Dam was constructed in 1977 across the Kalyani River, a tributary of Swarnamukhi. The gravity dam has a live storage capacity of 25 million cubic metres and supplies water to Tirupati city, often sufficient for up to two years.

== Environmental challenges ==
=== Heavy metal contamination ===
A 2018 study found that while river water was mostly free of contamination except for mild iron (Fe) and manganese (Mn), the sediments showed considerable to very high levels of chromium (Cr), copper (Cu), lead (Pb), and zinc (Zn), posing eco-toxicological risks.

=== Illegal sand mining ===
Illegal sand excavation is widespread in Naidupeta, Pellakuru, and Ozili mandals. Reports highlight the role of the sand mafia and lack of enforcement, with sand transported illegally to markets like Chennai. A geospatial study identified nine sand-mining hotspots in Srikalahasti and Thotambedu areas, revealing over-exploitation is affecting river discharge capacity.

=== Encroachment and land grabbing ===
Encroachments include illegal construction in buffer zones, blocked nalas, and diverted channels. Such activities worsened flooding in 2021 and damaged the river’s ecological balance.

== Conservation efforts ==
In 2025, the Tirupati Urban Development Authority (TUDA) launched Operation SWARNA (Swarnamukhi Waterbody Action for River and Nala Awareness), Andhra Pradesh’s first river rejuvenation programme. The plan includes:

- A drone survey from Thondavada to Srikalahasti to mark river boundaries and 50 m buffer zones.
- Removal of illegal structures, with criminal cases filed against offenders.
- Riverfront beautification at Tiruchanur to benefit pilgrims.
