= Gajula =

Gajula may refer to:

- Gajulamandyam
- Gajularega
