= Chandragiri mandal =

- Mandal
- Interactive map of Chandragiri mandal
- Location in Andhra Pradesh, India Chandragiri mandal (India)
- Coordinates: 13°33′54″N 79°18′28″E
- Country: India
- State: Andhra Pradesh
- District: Tirupati
- Headquarters: Chandragiri

Government
  - MLA: Pulivarthi Venkata Mani Prasad (TDP)
  - MP: Daggumalla Prasada Rao

Area
  - Mandal: 456 km^{2} (176 sq mi)

Population (2011)
  - Mandal: 57,286
  - Density: 126/km^{2} (325/sq mi)
  - Urban: 0
  - Rural: 57,286
- Time zone: UTC+05:30 (IST)

Chandragiri mandal is one of the 36 mandals in Tirupati district of the Indian state of Andhra Pradesh. It is under the administration of Tirupati revenue division and the headquarters are located at Chandragiri.

== History ==
Chandragiri mandal was made part of the newly formed Tirupati district effective from 4 April 2022 by the Government of Andhra Pradesh.

== Geography ==
The mandal is bounded by Chinnagottigallu, Pulicherla, Ramachandrapuram, Pakala, Penumuru, Vedurukuppam, Tirupati (urban) and Tirupati (rural) mandals.

== Demographics ==
Religions in Chandragiri mandal (2011)
Religion	Percent
Hindus	93.52%
Muslims	5.72%
Christians	0.41%
Others or not stated	0.35%
Distribution of religions

As per 2011 census, Chandragiri mandal had a total population of 57,286 with 28,334 male population and 28,952 female population with a density of 126/km^{2}. It had a sex ratio of 1022. Scheduled Castes and Scheduled Tribes made up 12,534 and 3,489 of the population respectively. It had a literacy rate of 73.99% with 82.14% among males and 66.08% among females.

== Administration ==
Chandragiri mandal is a part of the Tirupati revenue division. The headquarters are located at Chandragiri. As of 2011 census, the mandal comprises the following 23 villages:

1. Aagrala
2. Arepalle
3. Bheemavaram
4. Chandragiri
5. Chinna Rama Puram
6. Chintagunta
7. Dornakambala
8. Ithepalle
9. Kalroadpalle
10. Kondreddy Khandriga
11. Kotala
12. Mamandur
13. Mittapalem
14. Mungilipattukothapalle
15. Nagapatla
16. Narasingapuram
17. Pullaiahgaripalle
18. Ramireddipalle
19. Panapakam
20. Reddivaripalle
21. Sanambatla
22. Seshapuram
23. Thondawada

== Politics ==
Chandragiri mandal is one of the 7 mandals under Chandragiri Assembly constituency, which in turn is a part of Chittoor Lok Sabha constituency of Andhra Pradesh. As of 1 January 2018, the mandal has 43,010 eligible voters with 21,018 male and 21,992 female voters. Pulivarthi Venkata Mani Prasad is representing the Chandragiri constituency as the Member of the Legislative Assembly (MLA) in Andhra Pradesh Legislative Assembly, and Daggumalla Prasada Rao is representing the Chittoor constituency as the Member of Parliament (MP) in Lok Sabha.

== See also ==
- List of mandals of Andhra Pradesh
