= Yadamvaripalli =

- Village
- Country: India
- State: Andhra Pradesh
- District: Tirupati
- Mandal: Chinnagottigallu

Languages
  - Official: Telugu
- Time zone: UTC+5:30 (IST)
- PIN: 517561
- Vehicle registration: AP40

Yadamvaripalli is a village which is located in Chinnagottigallu mandal of Tirupati district, Andhra Pradesh. There is a famous Shri Draupathi Devi temple and every year Mahabaratham is being conducted in the temple premises
