= Gajulamandyam =

- Neighbourhood of Tirupati
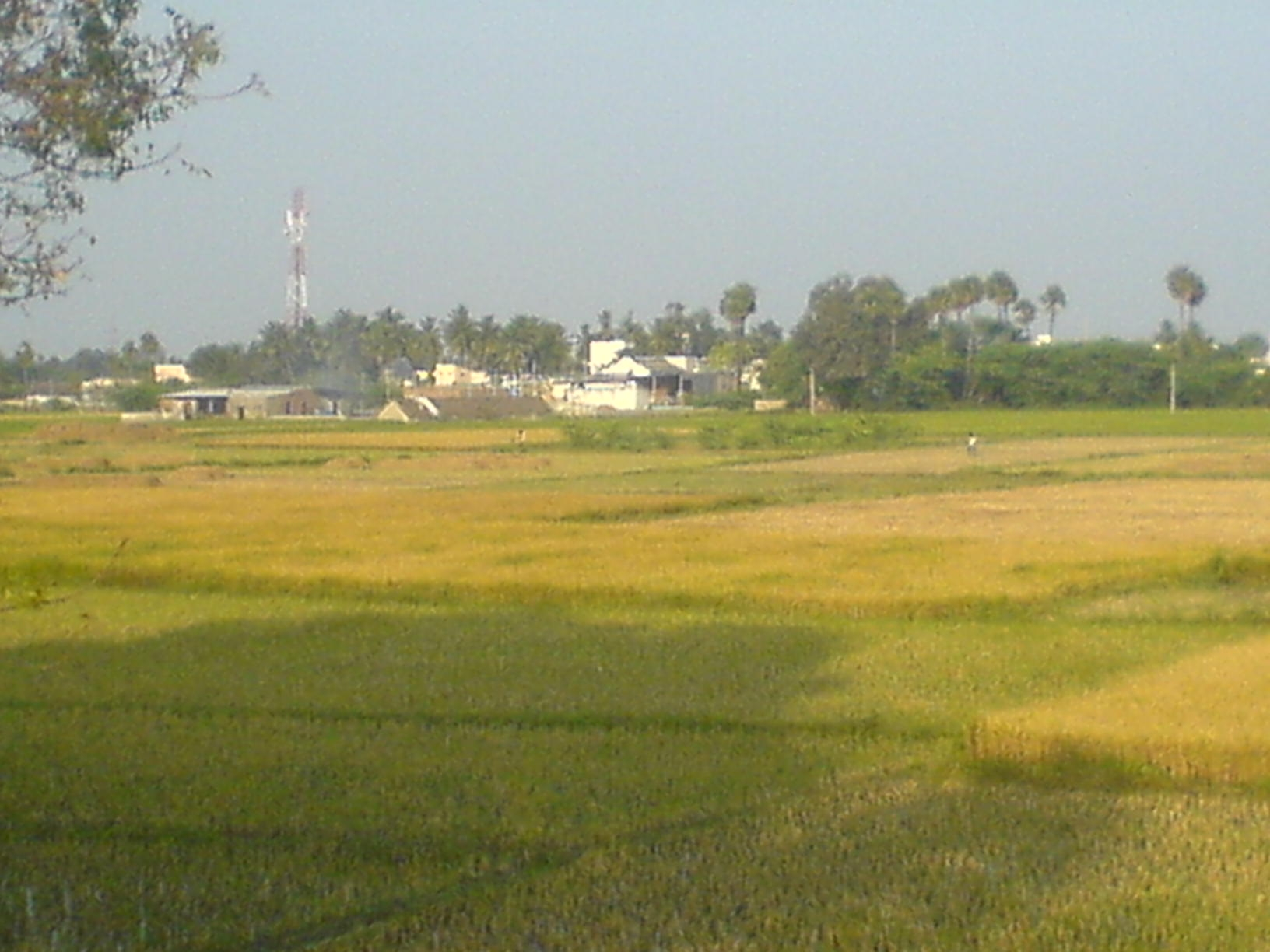
- Gajulamandyam view from west

- Location in Andhra Pradesh, India
- Coordinates: 13.65°N 79.42°E
- Country: India
- State: Andhra Pradesh
- District: Tirupati district
- City: Tirupati

Area
  - Total: 9.93 km^{2} (3.83 sq mi)

Population (2011)
  - Total: 5,042
  - Density: 508/km^{2} (1,320/sq mi)

Languages
  - Official: Telugu
- Time zone: UTC+5:30 (IST)

Gajulamandyam is a neighbourhood and suburb of Tirupati. It is located in Tirupati district of the Indian state of Andhra Pradesh. It falls in the jurisdictional limit of Tirupati Urban Development Authority. It is a part of Tirupati urban agglomeration and located in Renigunta mandal of Tirupati revenue division.

== Geography ==
Gajulamandyam is located at 13.65°N 79.42°E. It is spread over an area of 9.93 km^{2} (3.83 sq mi).

== Demographics ==
As of 2011 census, Gajulamandyam had a population of 5,042. The total population constitute, 2,558 males and 2,484 females —a sex ratio of 971 females per 1000 males. 486 children are in the age group of 0–6 years, of which 250 are boys and 236 are girls. The average literacy rate stands at 76.98% with 3,507 literates, significantly higher than the state average of 67.41%.

== Government and politics ==
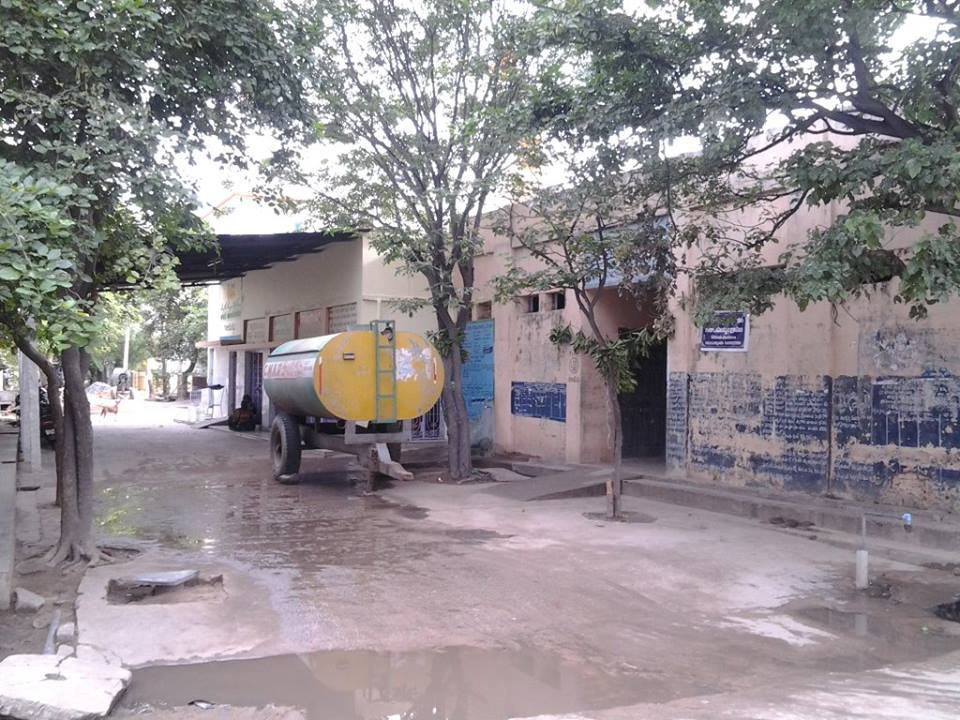
Gajulamandyam Gram Panchayat

Gajulamandyam gram panchayat is the local self-government. The gram panchayat is divided into wards and each ward is represented by an elected Ward member, also referred as Panchs. The elected members of the gram panchayat is headed by the president known as Sarpanch. The tenure of all the elected representatives is five for years. While, Secretary of the panchayat is a non elected representative, appointed by the Government of Andhra Pradesh to oversee panchayat activities.
