= Akkarampalle =

- Village
- Location in Andhra Pradesh, India
- Coordinates: 13°39′00″N 79°25′12″E
- Country: India
- State: Andhra Pradesh
- District: Tirupati

Government
  - Body: Tirupati Urban Development Authority(TUDA)

Area
  - Total: 5.03 km^{2} (1.94 sq mi)

Population (2011)
  - Total: 44,219
  - Density: 8,790/km^{2} (22,800/sq mi)

Languages
  - Official: Telugu
- Time zone: UTC+5:30 (IST)
- Vehicle registration: AP

Akkarampalle is a village in Tirupati Urban mandal, Tirupati district of the Indian state of Andhra Pradesh.

== Demographics ==
As of 2001 India census, Akkarampalle had a population of 20,325. Males constitute 51% of the population and females 49%. Akkarampalle has an average literacy rate of 62%, higher than the national average of 59.5%; with 57% of the males and 43% of females literate. 13% of the population is under 6 years of age. The religious makeup of Akkarampalle is approximately 94.10% Hindus and 5.75% Muslims while Christians, Sikhs, and Jains make up the remaining 1.15%.

== Education ==
The primary and secondary school education is imparted by government, aided and private schools, under the School Education Department of the state. The medium of instruction followed by different schools are English, Telugu.
