= Pullaiahgaripalli =

- Nickname: P.G.Palli
- Interactive map of Pullaiahgaripalli
- Location within Andhra Pradesh
- Coordinates: 13.616611°N 79.275689°E
- Country: India
- State: Andhra Pradesh
- District: Tirupati
- Elevation: 312.73 m (1,026.0 ft)

Population (2011)
  - Total: 783

Languages
  - Official: Telugu
- Time zone: UTC+5:30 (IST)
- PIN: 517102
- Telephone code: +91-877
- Vehicle registration: AP-03

Pullaiahgaripalli (P.G.Palli) is a neighbourhood village of Tirupati. It is a part of Tirupati urban agglomeration and located in Chandragiri mandal. It falls in the jurisdictional limit of Tirupati Urban Development Authority.

== Governance ==
- Pullaiahgaripalli falls under Chandragiri assembly constituency in Andhra Pradesh.
