= Pakala mandal =

Mandal in Tirupati district, Andhra Pradesh, India

- Mandal
- Interactive map of Pakala mandal
- Location in Andhra Pradesh, India Pakala mandal (India)
- Coordinates: 13°25′51″N 79°6′43″E
- Country: India
- State: Andhra Pradesh
- District: Tirupati
- Headquarters: Pakala

Government
  - MLA: Pulivarthi Venkata Mani Prasad (TDP)
  - MP: Daggumalla Prasada Rao

Area
  - Mandal: 182 km^{2} (70 sq mi)

Population (2011)
  - Mandal: 56,667
  - Density: 311/km^{2} (806/sq mi)
  - Urban: 0
  - Rural: 56,667
- Time zone: UTC+05:30 (IST)

Pakala mandal is one of the 36 mandals in Tirupati district of the Indian state of Andhra Pradesh. It is under the administration of Tirupati revenue division and the headquarters are located at Pakala.

== History ==
Pakala mandal was made part of the newly formed Tirupati district on 4 April 2022.

== Geography ==
The mandal is bounded by Chandragiri, Irala, Penumuru, Pulicherla and Puthalapattu mandals.

== Demographics ==
Religions in Pakala mandal (2011)
Religion	Percent
Hindus	84.76%
Muslims	13.85%
Christians	1.16%
Others or not stated	0.23%
Distribution of religions

As per 2011 census, Pakala mandal had a total population of 56,667 with 28,025 male population and 28,642 female population with a density of 311/km^{2}. It had a sex ratio of 1022. Scheduled Castes and Scheduled Tribes made up 13,122 and 1,474 of the population respectively. It had a literacy rate of 75.16% with 84.08% among males and 66.54% among females.

== Villages under Pakala mandal ==
List of all towns and villages in Pakala mandal of Tirupati district, Andhra Pradesh. Complete details of Population, Religion, Literacy and Sex Ratio in tabular format. us 2011

Home Andhra Pradesh District List Tirupati District Pakala Mandal

List of all towns and Villages in Pakala Mandal of Tirupati district, Andhra Pradesh. Complete details of Population, Religion, Literacy and Sex Ratio in tabular format.

- Achamma Agraharam,
- Adenapalle,
- Damalcheruvu,
- Gadanki,
- Ganugapenta,
- Gorpadu,
- K.oddepalle,
- Linganapalli,
- Maddinayanipalle,
- Mallelacheruvupalli,
- Mogarala
- Nagamma Agraharam,
- Nendragunta,
- Padiputlabayalu,
- Pakala,
- Pedda Ramapuram,
- Thotathimmaiah Palle,
- Vallivedu,
- Upparapalli.

== Administration ==
Pakala mandal is a part of the Tirupati revenue division. The headquarters are located at Pakala.

== Politics ==
Pakala mandal is one of the 7 mandals under Chandragiri Assembly constituency, which in turn is a part of Chittoor Lok Sabha constituency of Andhra Pradesh. As of 1 January 2018, the mandal has 40,655 eligible voters with 20,064 male and 20,591 female voters. Pulivarthi Venkata Mani Prasad is representing the Chandragiri constituency as the Member of the Legislative Assembly (MLA) in Andhra Pradesh Legislative Assembly, and Daggumalla Prasada Rao is representing the Chittoor constituency as the Member of Parliament (MP) in Lok Sabha.
