= Pakala =

Pakala may refer to:

- Pakala, Tirupati district, Andhra Pradesh
- Pakala, Prakasam district, Andhra Pradesh
- Pakala, Nepal village and V.D.C., Pyuthan District, Nepal
- Pakala Lake, Warangal district
- Pakala, Senegal, a canton in Senegal
- Sricharan Pakala, Indian music composer
