= Vikruthamala =

- Neighbourhood of Tirupati
- Interactive map of Vikruthamala
- Country: India
- State: Andhra Pradesh
- District: Tirupati
- City: Tirupati

Population (2011)
  - Total: 8,416

Languages
  - Official: Telugu
- Time zone: UTC+5:30 (IST)
- Vehicle registration: AP

Vikruthamala is an outgrowth suburb of Tirupati. It is a part of Tirupati urban agglomeration and located in the Tirupati district of Andhra pradesh, India. It falls in the jurisdictional limit of Tirupati Urban Development Authority.
