= Boddu =

Boddu (Telugu: బొడ్డు) a Telugu surname. Notable people with the surname include:

- Boddu Gopalam (1927–2004), Indian singer
- Boddu Srihari (fl. early 21st century), Indian athlete
