= Venugopalaswamy Temple, Karvetinagaram =

Venugopalaswamy Temple
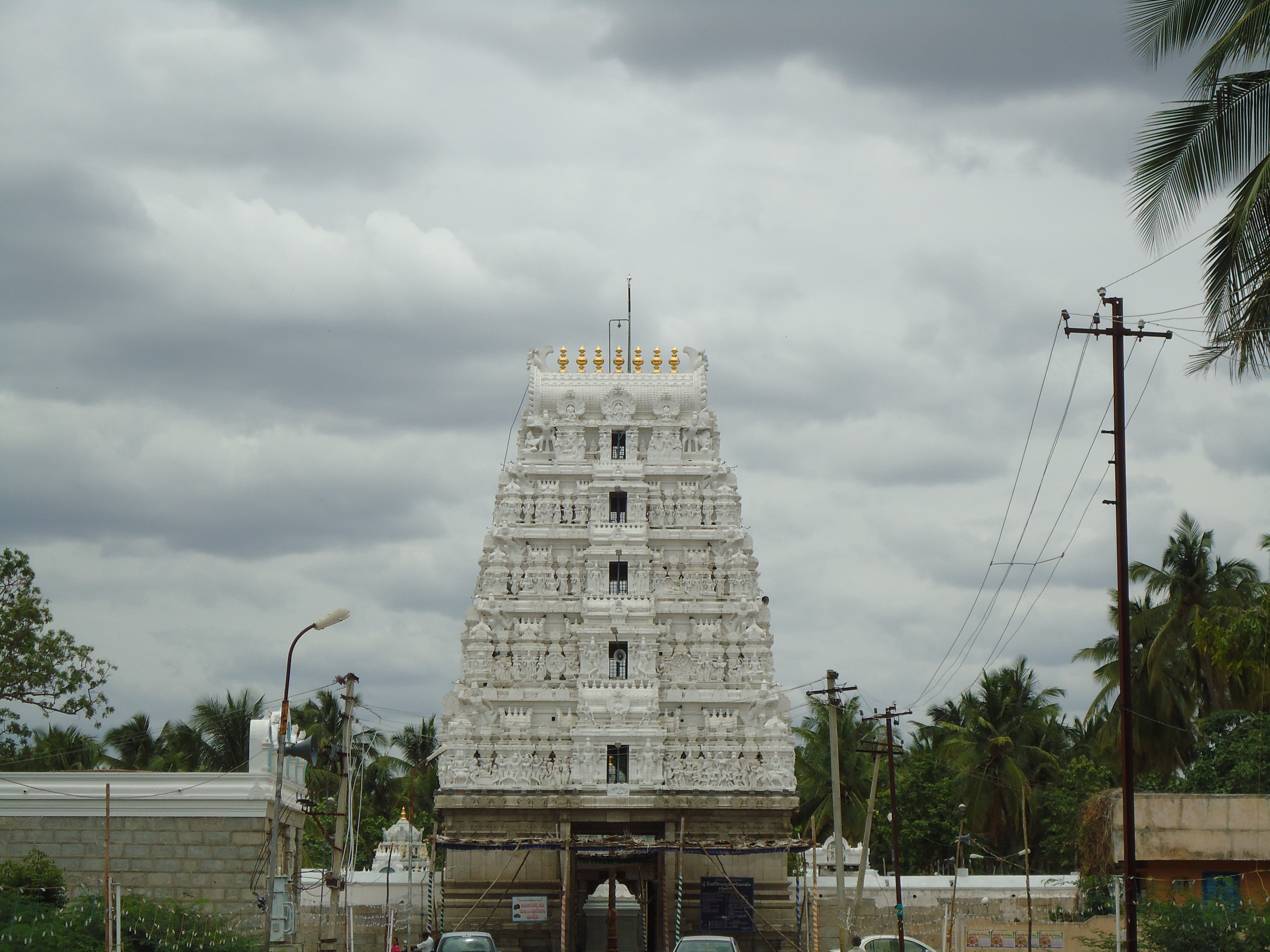

- Location in Andhra Pradesh

Religion
- Affiliation: Hinduism
- District: Chittoor
- Deity: Venugopalaswamy (Krishna); Rukmini and Satyabhama
- Features: Temple tank: Skanda Pushkarini

Location
- Location: Karvetinagaram
- State: Andhra Pradesh
- Country: India
- Coordinates: 13.35°N 79.41°E

Architecture
- Type: Dravidian architecture

Sri Venugopalaswamy Temple is a Hindu-Vaishnavite temple situated at Karvetinagaram in, Chittoor District of Andhra Pradesh state, India. The Temple is dedicated to Krishna, considered by believers to be the eighth incarnation of Vishnu's Dasavatharam, who is referred to as Venugopala. It is situated at a distance of 58 km from Tirupati and 12 km from Puttur.

== History ==
The temple was built by King Venkataperumal of Venkataraja dynasty.

== Administration ==
The temple is being administered by Tirumala Tirupati Devasthanams, an independent trust that manages operations in Tirupati, Andhra Pradesh, India.

== Presiding deities ==
The Garbhagriha hosts Venugopala swamy along with his consorts Rukmini and Satyabhama at the sides of the main deity. The statues were brought from Narayanavanam Temple and there are subshrines dedicated to Rama along with Sita, Lakshmana, Anjaneya, Parthasarathy, Renuka parameshwari, and Avanakshamma. The temple pond is referred to as skanda pushkarini.

== Poojas and festivals ==
Daily rituals are held as per Vaikanasa Agama. Temple celebrates Krishna Janmastami, Utlotsavam, Brahmotsavams, Vaikuntha Ekadasi, Ugadi, Sankranti

== Songs and hymns ==
Sarangapani, an early 18th century Telugu poet, had written many songs in praise of Venugopala swamy of this Temple, in Padam tradition. About 200 of his songs are in survive today in print form.

== See also ==
- List of temples under Tirumala Tirupati Devasthanams
- Kalyana Venkateswara Temple, Narayanavanam
- Vedanarayana Temple, Nagalapuram
