= Chinnagottigallu =

- Mandal
- Interactive map of Chinnagottigallu
- Location in Andhra Pradesh, India
- Coordinates: 13.7028°N 79.1514°E
- Country: India
- State: Andhra Pradesh
- District: Tirupati
- Mandal: Chinnagottigallu

Government
  - Type: Gram panchayat

Population (2011)
  - Total: 5,299

Languages
  - Official: Telugu
- Time zone: UTC+5:30 (IST)
- PIN: 517193
- Telephone code: +91–8584
- Vehicle registration: AP
- Nearest Cities: Pileru, Tirupati
- Assembly Constituency: Chandragiri
- Lok Sabha Constituency: Tirupati

Chinnagottigallu is a village in Tirupati district of the Indian state of Andhra Pradesh. It is the mandal headquarters of Chinnagottigallu mandal.
