= Karvetinagar =

- Village
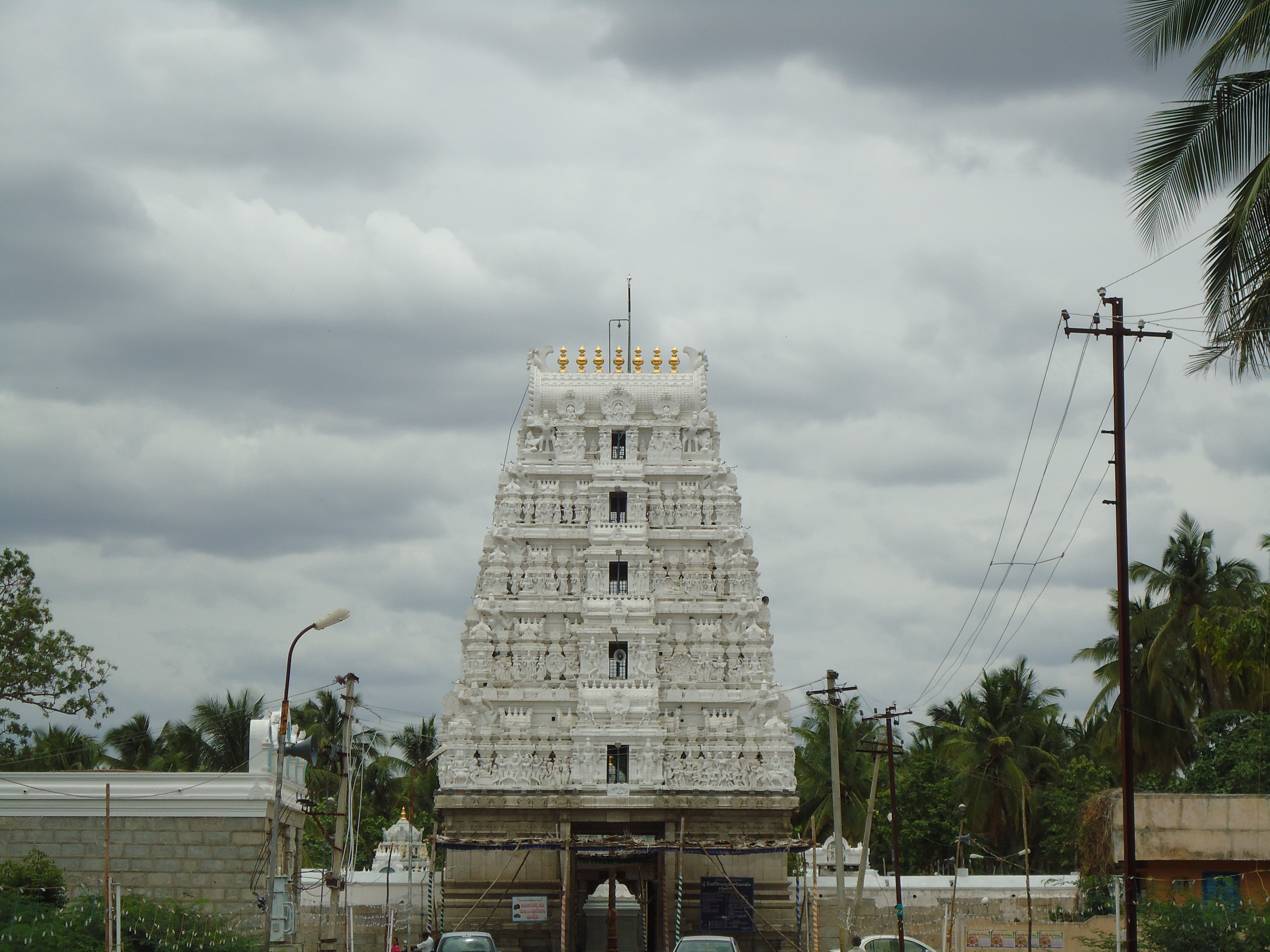
- Venugopalaswamy Temple

- Location in Andhra Pradesh, India
- Coordinates: 13.4167°N 79.4500°E
- Country: India
- State: Andhra Pradesh
- District: Chittoor
- Mandal: Karvetinagar

Government
  - Body: Tirupati Urban Development Authority(TUDA)
- Elevation: 252 m (827 ft)

Languages
  - Official: Telugu
- Time zone: UTC+5:30 (IST)

Karvetinagar or Karvetinagaram is a village in Chittoor district in the Indian state of Andhra Pradesh. It is the headquarters of Karvetinagar mandal. The town is known for the Venugopalaswamy Temple, that was constructed during the reign of the Venkataraja dynasty.

== Geography ==
Karvetinagar is located at 13.4167°N 79.4500°E. It has an average elevation of 252 meters.

== Connectivity ==
The nearest railway station is Puttur (11 kilometres (6.8 mi) distant) in Andhra Pradesh. Some express trains stop here. Frequent buses run from Puttur to Chittoor via Karvetinagar or from Pallipattu (8 kilometres (5.0 mi)) in Tamil Nadu. The nearest international airport is at Chennai (115 km), and Renigunta (Tirupati) (45 km) away.
