= Thondavada =

- Interactive map of Thondavada
- Location in Andhra Pradesh, India
- Country: India
- State: Andhra Pradesh
- District: Tirupati
- Mandal: Chandragiri

Telugu
  - Official: Telugu
- Time zone: UTC+5:30 (IST)
- ZIP Code: 517505
- Vehicle registration: AP

Thondavada is an outgrowth village of Tirupati City. It is situated in Tirupati district of the Indian state of Andhra Pradesh. It is a part of Tirupati urban agglomeration and located in Chandragiri mandal. It falls in the jurisdictional limit of Tirupati Urban Development Authority.
