= Obulavaripalle =

- Village
- Location in Andhra Pradesh, India
- Coordinates: 14°2′20.400″N 79°15′54.000″E
- Country: India
- State: Andhra Pradesh
- District: Tirupati
- Mandal: Obulavaripalle mandal

Government
  - Body: Mandal Parishad

Languages
  - Official: Telugu
- Time zone: UTC+5:30 (IST)
- Vehicle registration: AP-40

Obulavaripalle is a village in Tirupati district of the Indian state of Andhra Pradesh in the Rayalaseema region. It is under the administration of Tirupati revenue division, with its headquarters of Obulavaripalle mandal. The mandal is bounded by Kodur, Chitvel and Pullampeta mandals. After the opening of the Obulavaripalle to Krishnapatnam railway line, Obulavaripalle railway station became a junction railway station.

Bedded Barytes, Mangampet in Obulavaripalle mandal has been declared a National Geological Monument of India by the Geological Survey of India (GSI), for their protection, maintenance, promotion and enhancement of geotourism.
