= Chevireddy Bhaskar Reddy =

Indian politician

Member of Legislative Assembly Andhra Pradesh
- In office 2014–2024
- Preceded by: Galla Aruna Kumari
- Succeeded by: Pulivarthi Venkata Mani Prasad
- Constituency: Chandragiri

Personal details
- Born: Thummalagunta, Tirupati district, Andhra Pradesh, India
- Party: YSR Congress Party
- Occupation: Politician

Chevireddy Bhaskar Reddy was a member of the Legislative Assembly of Andhra Pradesh, representing the Chandragiri (Assembly constituency) in the Tirupati district.

He was first elected in 2014 as a member of the legislative Assembly (MLA) through YSR Congress and the second time he was re-elected in 2019 as a Member of the Legislative Assembly (MLA) through YSR Congress Party.

He Unsuccessfully contested from Ongole Loksabha in 2024 Lok Sabha Elections.

== Personal life ==
Chevireddy Bhaskar Reddy hails from Thummalagunta village near Tirupati. He attended school and college in Tirupati.

He has a Bachelor of Arts (BA), Bachelor of Law (BL) and completed his PhD in Development of Andhrapradesh : Contribution of Sri.YS Rajasekhar Reddy YSR from SV University.

== Political career ==
He worked as student leader in SV university under NSUI. He became a ZPTC (Zilla Parishad Member) at age 27 with the blessings of YS Rajasekhar Reddy, serving as a member for 5 years. In 2007 he became TUDA chairman and in 2014 was elected as MLA from Chandragiri constituency.
