= Pakala, Prakasam district =

Pakala పాకల
- Village
- Interactive map of Pakala
- Location in Andhra Pradesh, India
- Coordinates: 15.2694°N 80.0720°E
- Country: India
- State: Andhra Pradesh
- District: Prakasam

Government
  - Body: Gram panchayat

Languages
  - Official: Telugu
- Time zone: UTC+5:30 (IST)
- PIN: 523101
- ISO 3166 code: IN-AP
- Vehicle registration: AP

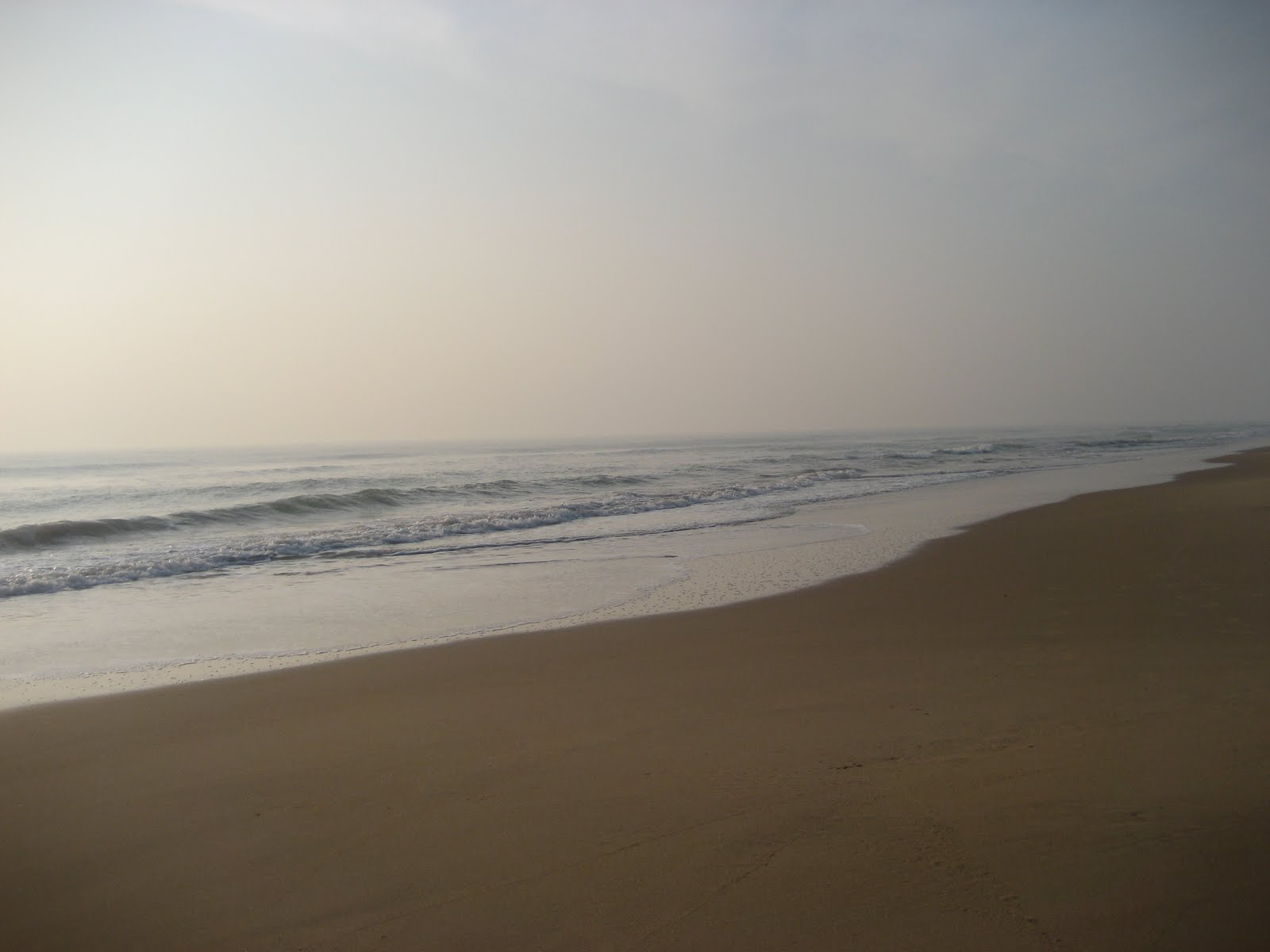
The shoreline of Pakala Beach on the Bay of Bengal.

Pakala is a coastal village in Prakasam district of the Indian state of Andhra Pradesh. It is located in Singarayakonda mandal.

== History ==
=== Early history and inscriptions ===
The village of Pakala is home to a historic Shiva temple (Sivalayam) featuring several Telugu and Tamil inscriptions spanning the late 13th and early 14th centuries. In the majority of these epigraphs, the presiding deity is referred to as Ramalinga Swami (or Ramalingadeva). A 1905 epigraphical survey recorded the deity's name in the Tamil inscription as Ilangasenukuliya and the village as Pākkal. However, the published Tamil transcription of this specific record indicates the stone was heavily weathered, with several characters bracketed as illegible reconstructions. Because of this damage, and the fact that all surrounding inscriptions refer to Ramalinga Swami, the anomalous name is highly likely a transcription error of the Tamil rendering for the Lord of Ramalingesvara (Irāmaliṅgēśvaramuḍaiya).

The temple received notable patronage during the Kakatiya dynasty. The oldest recorded inscription, dated to 1268–1269 A.D., registers a land grant to the deity by Rudra Pregada, the prime minister of the Kakatiya monarch Rudradeva (the male title assumed by queen Rudrama Devi). Later inscriptions from 1320–1321 A.D. were issued during the reign of Prataparudra (Pratapa Rudradeva Maharaja). The temple's epigraphs also record various endowments—such as land for perpetual lamps, sacred flower gardens, and a temple bell—made by local officials, members of the Panta Reddy community, and the Nagaramlonivaru (Komati) merchants of Nellore.

=== British era and salt production ===
During the British colonial period, Pakala functioned as an active port, serving primarily as a transport hub for grain and salt exports. According to the Gazetteer of the Nellore District (1938), the village was home to a major salt factory known for producing a distinct reddish-brown salt. Of the four main salt factories in the Nellore district at the time (Pakala, Isakapalle, Krishnapatnam, and Tada), Pakala recorded the highest average annual sales at 420,033 maunds (approximately 15,675 metric tons).

The gazetteer also noted that the village's infrastructure included two tanks, two temples, and a private satram (rest house). At the time, the population of Pakala was recorded as 4,958, comprising 4,411 Hindus, 328 Muslims, and 219 Christians.

== Geography ==
Pakala is located on the shore of the Bay of Bengal, 5 km (3.1 mi) east of Singarayakonda and 3 km (1.9 mi) north of Ullapalem, with sea on the east. It is located at coordinates 15°16' N and 80°04' E at elevation starting at one foot near Pallepalem and about 25 ft (7.6 m) on the west side of village. The mouth of the Paleru river is about three miles north of Pakala.

== Demographics ==
As of 2011 India census, Pakala had a population of 26,500 Males: 14,000. Females: 12,500.

== See also ==
- Singarayakonda mandal
