= Nara Ramamurthy Naidu =

Indian politician (1952–2024)

Member of Legislative Assembly United Andhra Pradesh
- In office 1994–1999
- Preceded by: Aruna Kumari Galla
- Succeeded by: Aruna Kumari Galla
- Constituency: Chandragiri

Personal details
- Born: Nara Ramamurthy Naidu; 18 March 1952
- Died: 16 November 2024 (aged 72) Hyderabad, Telangana, India
- Party: Telugu Desam Party
- Children: 2 including Nara Rohit
- Relatives: Nara Chandrababu Naidu (brother)

Nara Ramamurthy Naidu (1952 – 16 November 2024) was an Indian politician. He was elected to the Andhra Pradesh Legislative Assembly from Chandragiri in the 1994 Andhra Pradesh Legislative Assembly election as a member of the Telugu Desam Party.

Naidu died on 16 November 2024, at the age of 72. He was brother of Nara Chandrababu Naidu and father of actor Nara Rohit.
