= Commissioner and Director of Municipal Administration, Andhra Pradesh =

- Type: Governmental organization
- Purpose: Civic Administration
- Location: Andhra Pradesh, India
- Official language: Telugu
- Commissioner and Director: Shri M Hari Narayanan, IAS
- Website: cdma.ap.gov.in

Commissioner and Director of Municipal Administration, Andhra Pradesh (C&DMA-AP) is the head of Directorate of Municipal Administration, Government of Andhra Pradesh, India, which is one of the main organizations under Municipal Administration and Urban Development Department of Government of Andhra Pradesh.

Its oversees the urban local body related activities such as, civic administration, tax collection and other civic amenities etc. The present Commissioner and Director is Shri M Hari Narayanan, IAS.
