= Municipal Administration and Urban Development Department, Andhra Pradesh =

Municipal Administration and Urban Development Department
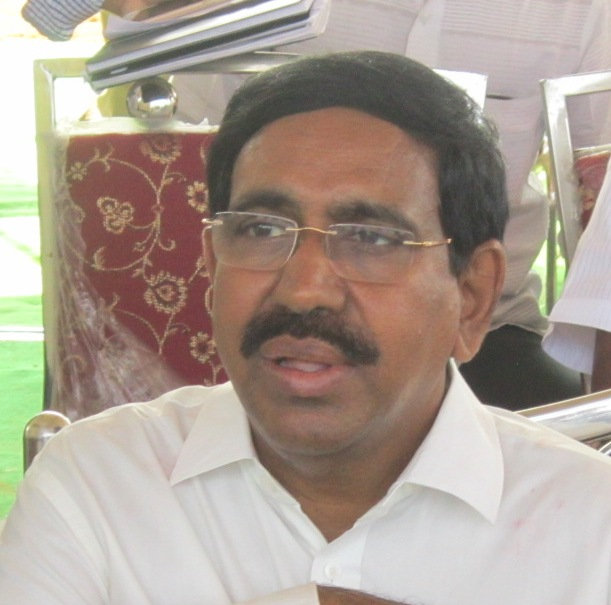
- Ponguru Narayana
- Type: Governmental organization
- Purpose: Urban civic governance
- Location: Andhra Pradesh, India
- Official language: Telugu
- Cabinet Minister: Dr. Ponguru Narayana
- Principal Secretary: Sri Lakshmi
- Website: urban.ap.gov.in/MAUD/Index.html

Municipal Administration and Urban Development Department is one of the governing body of Government of Andhra Pradesh for the purpose of planning and development of urban areas and civic governance. It is headed by Dr. Ponguru Narayana, the cabinet minister of Andhra Pradesh. The present Principal Secretary is Y. Srilakshmi.

The organization comprises 12 departments. They are:

S.No.	Departments
1	Andhra Pradesh Cleaning and Greening Corporation
2	Andhra Pradesh Capital Region Development Authority
3	Andhra Pradesh Municipal Development Project (APMDP)
4	Andhra Pradesh Urban Finance and Infrastructure Development Corporation (APUFIDC)
5	Commissioner and Director of Municipal Administration (C&DMA)
6	Director of Town and Country Planning (DT&CP)
7	Mission for Elimination of Poverty in Municipal Areas (MEPMA)
8	Municipal Corporations (GVMC, VMC)
9	Public Health Engineering Department (PHED)
10	Swachha Andhra Pradesh Corporation
11	Urban Development Authorities (UDAs) (VMRDA, TUDA)
