= Chandragiri Assembly constituency =

Constituency of the Andhra Pradesh Legislative Assembly, India

Coordinates: 13.59°N 79.32°E

Chandragiri
- Constituency No. 166 for the Andhra Pradesh Legislative Assembly
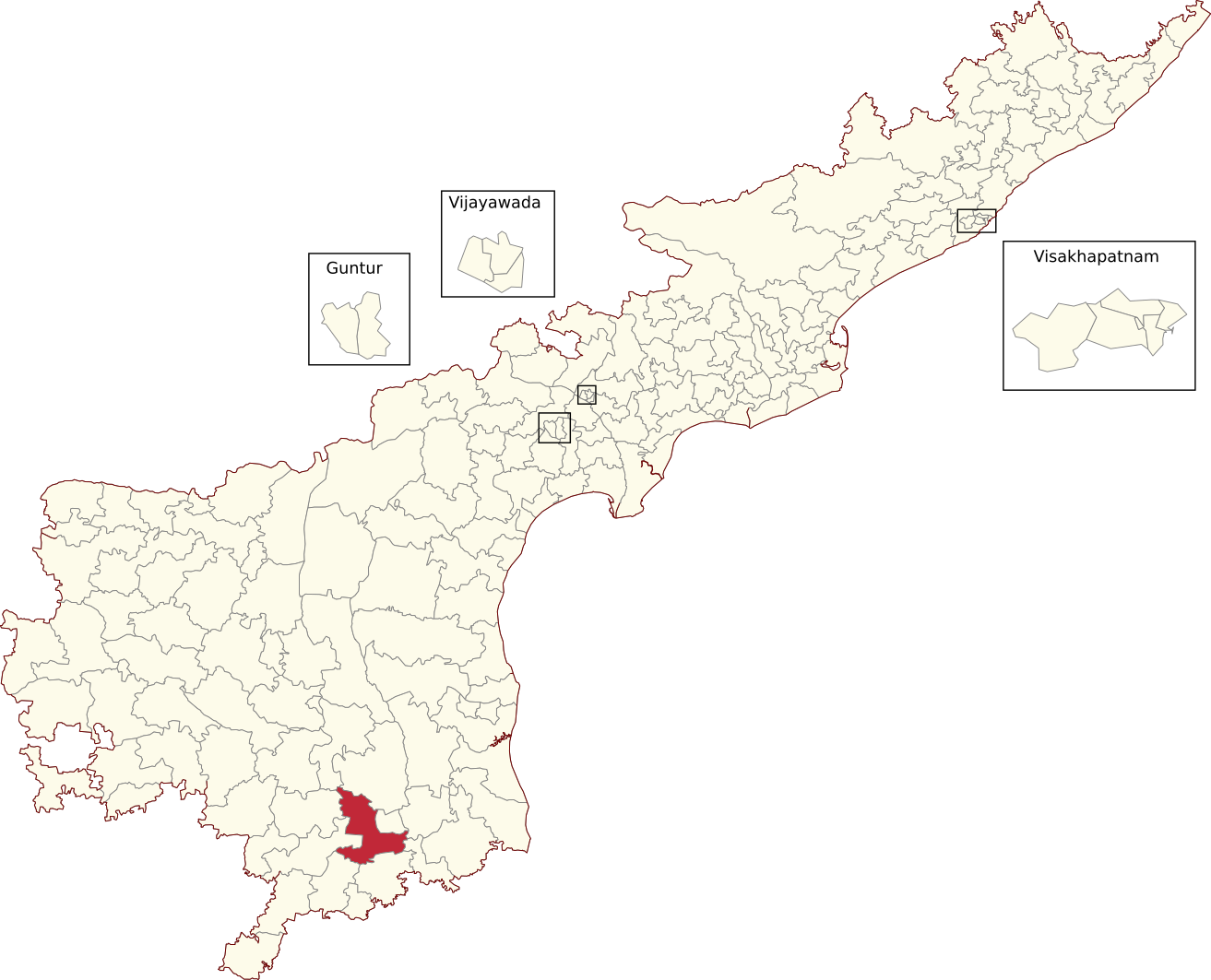
- Location of Chandragiri Assembly constituency within Andhra Pradesh

Constituency details
- Country: India
- Region: South India
- State: Andhra Pradesh
- District: Tirupati
- Lok Sabha constituency: Chittoor
- Established: 1951
- Total electors: 291,734
- Reservation: None

Member of Legislative Assembly
- 16th Andhra Pradesh Legislative Assembly
- Incumbent Pulivarthi Venkata Mani Prasad
- Party: TDP
- Alliance: NDA
- Elected year: 2024

Chandragiri Assembly constituency is a constituency in Tirupati district of Andhra Pradesh that elects representatives to the Andhra Pradesh Legislative Assembly in India. It is one the seven assembly segments of Chittoor Lok Sabha constituency.

Pulivarthi Nani is the current MLA of the constituency, having won the 2024 Andhra Pradesh Legislative Assembly election from Telugu Desam Party. As of 2019, there are a total of 291,734 electors in the constituency. The constituency was established in 1951, as per the Delimitation Orders (1951).

== Mandals ==
Chandragiri Assembly constituency consists of Six Mandals.

Mandals
Tirupati Rural mandal(Partially)
Chandragiri mandal
Pakala mandal
Ramachandrapuram mandal
Chinnagottigallu mandal
Yerravaripalem mandal

== Members of the Legislative Assembly ==
Election results are as follows:

Year	Winner	Political party
1952	A. Adikesavalu Naidu	Indian National Congress
1978	Nara Chandrababu Naidu	Indian National Congress (I)
1983	Medasani Venkatarama Naidu	Telugu Desam Party
1985	N. R. Jayadeva Naidu	Telugu Desam Party
1989	Galla Aruna Kumari	Indian National Congress
1994	Nara Ramamurthy Naidu	Telugu Desam Party
1999	Galla Aruna Kumari	Indian National Congress
2004	Galla Aruna Kumari	Indian National Congress
2009	Galla Aruna Kumari	Indian National Congress
2014	Chevireddy Bhaskar Reddy	YSR Congress Party
2019	Chevireddy Bhaskar Reddy	YSR Congress Party
2024	Pulivarthi Venkata Mani Prasad	Telugu Desam Party

== Election results ==
=== 1952 ===
1952 Madras Legislative Assembly election: Chandragiri
Party	Candidate	Votes	%	±%
INC	A. Adikesavalu Naiudu	23,988	46.99	
Independent	V. Raja Reddi	18,006	35.27	
CPI	V. Dasaratha Rao	4,514	8.84	
SP	Rama Chandra Reddi	1,944	3.81	
	K. Narasayya	1,576	3.09	
KMPP	M. Krishnamurthy	1,024	2.01	
Margin of victory		5,982	11.72	
Turnout		51,052	64.95	
Registered electors		78,604		
INC win (new seat)				

=== 1978 ===
1978 Andhra Pradesh Legislative Assembly election: Chandragiri
Party	Candidate	Votes	%	±%
INC(I)	Nara Chandrababu Naidu	35,092	44.23	
JP	Kongara Pattabhi Rama Chowdary	32,598	41.08	new
INC	P. Balasubramanyam Chowdary	6,482	8.17	
Majority		2,494	3.15	
Turnout		79,338	77.3	
INC(I) gain from		Swing		

=== 1983 ===
1983 Andhra Pradesh Legislative Assembly election: Chandragiri
Party	Candidate	Votes	%	±%
TDP	Medasani Venkatarama Naidu	50,010	59.49	new
INC	Nara Chandrababu Naidu	32,581	38.76	
Majority		17,429	20.73	
Turnout		84,058	77.68	▲0.4
TDP gain from INC(I)		Swing		

=== 1985 ===
1985 Andhra Pradesh Legislative Assembly election: Chandragiri
Party	Candidate	Votes	%	±%
TDP	N.R.Jayadevanaidu	44,155	50.09	▼9.40
INC	P.Balasubramanyam Chowdary	42,475	48.18	▲9.42
Majority		1,680	1.91	
Turnout		88,141	71.2	▼6.5
TDP hold		Swing		

=== 1989 ===
1989 Andhra Pradesh Legislative Assembly election: Chandragiri
Party	Candidate	Votes	%	±%
INC	Aruna Kumari Galla	54,270	49.84	▲1.66
TDP	N.R.Jayadevanaidu	54,005	49.60	▼0.49
Majority		265	0.14	
Turnout		108,872	75	▲3.8
INC gain from TDP		Swing		

=== 1994 ===
1994 Andhra Pradesh Legislative Assembly election: Chandragiri
Party	Candidate	Votes	%	±%
TDP	Nara Ramamurthy Naidu	60,311	54.62	▲5.02
INC	Aruna Kumari Galla	43,959	39.81	▼10.03
Majority		16,352	14.81	
Turnout		110,402	76.6	▲1.6
TDP gain from INC		Swing		

=== 1999 ===
1999 Andhra Pradesh Legislative Assembly election: Chandragiri
Party	Candidate	Votes	%	±%
INC	Aruna Kumari Galla	57,915	50.37	▲10.56
TDP	Nara Ramamurthy Naidu	55,644	48.39	▼6.23
Majority		2,271	1.98	
Turnout		114,970	73.1	▼3.5
INC gain from TDP		Swing		

=== 2004 ===
2004 Andhra Pradesh Legislative Assembly election: Chandragiri
Party	Candidate	Votes	%	±%
INC	Aruna Kumari Galla	46,838	40.21	▼10.16
TDP	E. Ramanadham Naidu	32,446	27.86	▼20.53
Independent	Nara Ramamurthy Naidu	31,525	27.07	
Majority		14,392	12.35	
Turnout		116,471	75.87	▲2.77
INC gain from TDP		Swing		

=== 2009 ===
2009 Andhra Pradesh Legislative Assembly election: Chandragiri
Party	Candidate	Votes	%	±%
INC	Aruna Kumari Galla	71,942	42.10	▲1.89
TDP	Roja Selvamani	60,962	35.68	▲7.82
PRP	Saikam Sairamani	29,833	17.46	new
Majority		10,980	6.42	
Turnout		170,871	77.98	▲2.11
INC hold		Swing		

=== 2014 ===
2014 Andhra Pradesh Legislative Assembly election: Chandragiri
Party	Candidate	Votes	%	±%
YSRCP	Chevireddy Bhaskar Reddy	100,924	49.06	
TDP	Aruna Kumari Galla	96,406	46.86	▲11.18
Majority		4,518	2.20	
Turnout		205,724	83.27	▲5.29
YSRCP gain from INC		Swing		

=== 2019 ===
2019 Andhra Pradesh Legislative Assembly election: Chandragiri
Party	Candidate	Votes	%	±%
YSRCP	Chevireddy Bhaskar Reddy	127,790	56.00	▲6.94
TDP	Pulivarthi Venkata Mani Prasad	86,035	37.70	▼9.16
JSP	Dr Setty Surendra	4,531	1.99	new
NOTA	None Of The Above	1,777	0.78	
BJP	P. Madhu Babu	1,158	0.51	
Majority		41,755	18.3	
Turnout		228,192	89.0	▲5.73
YSRCP hold		Swing		

=== 2024 ===
2024 Andhra Pradesh Legislative Assembly election: Chandragiri
Party	Candidate	Votes	%	±%
TDP	Pulivarthi Nani	143,667	56.73	▲19.03
YSRCP	Chevireddy Mohit Reddy	99,815	34.16	▼21.84
INC	Kanuparthy Srinivasulu	2,971	1.01	▲0.33
NOTA	None Of The Above	1,700	0.58	▼0.2
Majority		43,852	22.57	
Turnout		255,249	79.89	▼9.11
TDP gain from YSRCP		Swing		

== See also ==
- List of constituencies of Andhra Pradesh Vidhan Sabha
