= Vadamalapeta =

- Village
- Interactive map of Vadamalapeta
- Location in Andhra Pradesh, India Vadamalapeta (India)
- Coordinates: 13.5667°N 79.5167°E
- Country: India
- State: Andhra Pradesh
- District: Tirupati
- Mandal: Vadamalapeta
- Elevation: 252 m (827 ft)

Languages
  - Official: Telugu
- Time zone: UTC+5:30 (IST)
- Postal code: 517551
- Vehicle registration: AP

Vadamalapeta is a village and headquarters of Vadamalapeta mandal in Tirupati district of the Indian state of Andhra Pradesh. It is located on the outskirts of the famous Tirupati city. It falls in the jurisdictional limit of Tirupati Urban Development Authority. It is part of Vadamalapeta mandal, which is under the jurisdiction of Tirupati revenue division. Vadamalapeta mandal, along with its villages including Vadamalapeta was made part of the newly formed Tirupati district on 4 April 2022.

== Geography ==
Vadamalapeta is located at 13.5667°N 79.5167°E. It has an average elevation of 252. The temple of Lord Sri Venkateswara temple is located in Appalayagunta village under Vadamalapeta mandal. A.M.Puram (Abbikandriga) is the village with highest literacy rate in Vadamalapeta Mandal (taluk).

== Village Code ==
Sl No	Village Name	Village Code
1	Kadirimangalam	596256
2	Ayyannagaripalle	596268
3	K.G.Khandriga	596255
4	Alimelu Manga Puram	596272
5	Kallur	596257
6	Kayam	596254
7	Pachikalva	596252
8	Padiredu	596261
9	Padiredu Aranyam	596262
10	Pathiputhuru	596253
11	Pudi	596265
12	Ramasamudram	596263
13	S.V. Puram	596271
14	Seethamma Agraharam	596270
15	Seetharama Puram	596269
16	Sri Bommaraju Puram	596273
17	Srinivasapuram	596260
18	T.C.Agraharam	596258
19	Thatneri	596259
20	Thirumandyam	596267
21	Vadamala	596264
22	Vemapuram	596266

== Vadamalapeta Mandal population list ==
As per the 2021 Aadhar estimates, Vadamalapeta Mandal population in 2021 is 40,185 Out of which Male are 19,380, Female are 20,805. (Ratio is 100 Male :107 Female)

Vadamalapeta Mandal has a total of 22 locations/villages, Below is the population table showing male, female and household information in the Tirupati district.

Sl.NO	Locations/Villages	Population	Male	Female	Households
1	Kadirimangalam	1,022	481	541	230
2	Pachikalva	410	193	217	112
3	Pathiputhuru	3,560	1,797	1,763	890
4	Kayam	1,837	918	919	455
5	K.G.Khandriga	41	18	23	14
6	Kallur	759	380	379	193
7	T.C.Agraharam	1,724	847	877	409
8	Thatneri	591	307	284	152
9	Srinivasapuram	380	159	221	109
10	Padiredu	1,873	933	940	482
11	Padiredu Aranyam	721	364	357	182
12	Ramasamudram	1,046	520	526	259
13	Vadamala	5,603	2,786	2,817	1,435
14	Pudi	1,001	492	509	238
15	Vemapuram	864	397	467	239
16	Thirumandyam	2,951	1,460	1,491	758
17	Ayyannagaripalle	486	231	255	109
18	Seetharama Puram	3,970	2,005	1,965	1,019
19	Seethamma Agraharam	377	225	152	91
20	S.V. Puram	4,767	2,470	2,297	1,279
21	Alimelu Manga Puram	2,215	1,090	1,125	594
22	Sri Bommaraju Puram	3,987	1,970	2,017	1,030
Grand Total		40,185	19,380	20,805	10,279
