= Boddu Srihari =

Indian track and field Para Athlete

Personal information
- Nationality: Indian
- Education: Graduate

Sport
- Country: India
- Sport: Track & Field
- Disability: Visual Impairment - Low Vision
- Disability class: T-13
- Event(s): 100m, 200m, Long jump
- Coached by: Zaseem
Medal record
Representing India
Men's athletics
6th Indian Open Para International Meet 2024
Silver medal – second place	Bengaluru	Long Jump
Silver medal – second place	Bengaluru	200m
Bronze medal – third place	Bengaluru	100m
Khelo India Para Games 2023
Gold medal – first place	Delhi	Long Jump

Boddu Sri Hari is an Indian track and field Para Athlete from Andhra Pradesh. Hari was born in Woollapalem Village of Singarayakonda Mandal of Prakasam District. He represents India in the Men's 100m, 200m and long jump events. Hari was born with Visual Impairment Disability.

== Childhood and early life ==
Boddu Srihari is from poor family. His parents earn through Agriculture Labour works. He plays Outdoor games like Hockey, Hand Ball, etc in his childhood days. He won Hockey tournament and many prizes in Hand ball during High School days.

== Career ==
Hari is one of the Top Para Athletes from Andhra Pradesh in Long Jump event. Currently he holds 2nd rank in India in the event Long Jump event under T13 category.

=== 6th Indian Open Para Athletics International Meet ===
Year	Venue	Event	Category	Result
2024	Bengaluru	Long Jump	T13	Silver
2024	Bengaluru	200m	T13	Silver
2024	Bengaluru	100m	T13	Bronze

=== Khelo India Para Games ===
Year	Venue	Event	Category	Result
2023	Delhi	Long Jump	T13	Gold

=== 5th Indian Open Para Athletics International Championship ===
Year	Venue	Event	Category	Result
2023	Bengaluru	Long Jump	T13	Silver
2023	Bengaluru	200m	T13	Bronze

=== IBSA Nationals, 2022 ===
Year	Venue	Event	Category	Result
2022	Delhi	Long Jumo	T13	Silver

=== National Para Athletic Championships ===
Year	Venue	Event	Category	Result
2024	Goa	Long Jump	T13	Bronze
2023	Pune	Long Jump	T13	Silver
