= Obulavaripalle mandal,Tirupati district =

Mandal in Tirupati district, Andhra Pradesh, India

Obulavaripalle mandal
- Mandal
- Interactive map of Obulavaripalle mandal
- Location in Andhra Pradesh, India
- Coordinates: 14°2′20.400″N 79°15′54.000″E
- Country: India
- State: Andhra Pradesh
- District: Tirupati
- Headquarters: Obulavaripalle
- Time zone: UTC+05:30 (IST)

Obulavaripalle mandal is one of the 36 mandals in Tirupati district in the Indian state of Andhra Pradesh. It is a part of Tirupati revenue division.

== History ==
The mandal used to be a part of Annamayya district and was made part of the Tirupati district on 31 December 2025..

== Towns and villages ==
As of 2011 census, the mandal has 15 settlements, which includes 1 census town and 14 villages. Mangampet is the only urban settlement, categorised as a census town in the mandal.

The settlements in the mandal are listed below:

1. Papireddipalli
2. Venkatesapuram
3. Gobburuvaripalle
4. Peddarampadu
5. Rallacheruvupalle
6. Botimeedapalle
7. Bommavaram
8. Govindampalle
9. Mangampeta (C.T)
10. Mukkavaripalle
11. Chenna Raju Podu
12. Jillelamadakavaddepalle
13. Korlakunta
14. Yerraguntakota
15. Gadela
16. Nukanapalle

Note: C.T-census town
