= Kammapalle =

- Village
- Interactive map of Kammapalle
- Location in Andhra Pradesh, India
- Coordinates: 13°33′03″N 79°26′41″E
- Country: India
- State: Andhra Pradesh
- District: Tirupati
- Talukas: Ramachandrapuram mandal

Languages
  - Official: Telugu
- Time zone: UTC+5:30 (IST)
- PIN: 517561
- Vehicle registration: AP40

Kammapalle is a village and mandal headquarters of Ramachandrapuram mandal in the Tirupati district in the state of Andhra Pradesh in India.
