= Puttur railway station =

Railway station in Andhra Pradesh, India

Puttur

General information
- Location: Puttur, Tirupati, Andhra Pradesh; India
- Coordinates: 13.45°N 79.55°E
- System: Indian Railways station
- Owner: Indian Railways
- Operator: Indian Railways
- Line: Gudur–Renigunta–Arakkonam branch line
- Platforms: 3
- Tracks: 5 ft 6 in (1,676 mm) broad gauge

Construction
- Structure type: Standard (on ground)
- Accessible: Disabled access

Other information
- Station code: PUT
- Zone(s): SR
- Division(s): Chennai

Services
Preceding station	Indian Railways	Following station
Taduku towards	Southern Railway zone Gudur–Renigunta–Arakkonam branch line	Vepagunta towards
Location
- Location within Andhra Pradesh Location within India

Puttur railway station (station code: PUT) is a station in the Southern Railway zone of the Indian Railways in Puttur, Tirupati district, Andhra Pradesh. It is situated on Chennai–Gudur–Renigunta line.

It is located on the Gudur–Chennai section comes under the jurisdiction of Chennai railway division. It is classified as a NSG-5 station (annual revenue less than 10 million rupees and less than 1 million passengers handled).

There are several trains to Tirupati, Chennai, Coimbatore, Hyderabad, Kurnool, Bengaluru, Mysuru, Hubballi which stops at Puttur railway station.

== See also ==
- List of railway stations in India
