= Kalyani Dam =

Dam in Andhra Pradesh, India

- Location within Andhra Pradesh
- Official name: Kalyani Dam
- Country: India
- Location: Tirupati, Tirupati district, Andhra Pradesh
- Coordinates: 13°39′27.5″N 79°16′9.4″E
- Purpose: Irrigation & Water supply
- Owner: Government of Andhra Pradesh

Dam and spillways
- Type of dam: Normal dam
- Impounds: Swarnamukhi River

Reservoir
- Catchment area: 48.56 km^{2} (18.75 sq mi)

The Kalyani Dam is a gravity dam constructed across the Swarnamukhi river at Tirupati city and located in Tirupati District of Andhra Pradesh, India. This dam is one of the major sources of water supply for Tirupati city and its catchment areas. Once filled, the dam can cater to the water needs of Tirupati for at least two years.

== History ==
The dam was constructed in the year 1977.

== Location ==
The dam was constructed across Swarnamukhi River with 25 million cubic meters storage capacity between hills which are part of Seshachalam Hill ranges.

== Data ==
- Catchment area: 48.56 km^{2} (18.75 sq mi)
- Location of dam: Tirupati, Tirupati District, Andhra Pradesh
- Full Reservoir Level: 274.31 metres (900 ft) msl

== See also ==
- Swarnamukhi
- Tirupati
