= Ramachandrapuram mandal, Tirupati district =

Ramachandrapuram mandal
- Mandal
- Interactive map of Ramachandrapuram mandal
- Location in Andhra Pradesh, India Ramachandrapuram mandal (India)
- Country: India
- State: Andhra Pradesh
- District: Tirupati
- Headquarters: Kammapalle
- Time zone: UTC+05:30 (IST)

Ramachandrapuram mandal is one of the 36 mandals in Tirupati district of the Indian state of Andhra Pradesh. It is under the administration of Tirupati revenue division and the headquarters are located at Kammapalle.

== History ==
Ramachandrapuram mandal was a part of Chittoor district until 2022. It was made part of the newly formed Tirupati district effective from 4 April 2022 by the Government of Andhra Pradesh.

== Geography ==
The mandal is bounded by Chandragiri, Tirupati (rural), Vadamalapeta and Vedurukuppam mandals.

== Administration ==
Ramachandrapuram mandal is a part of Tirupati revenue division. The headquarters are located at Kammapalle.
