= Singarayakonda mandal =

- Mandal
- Interactive Map Outlining mandal
- Location in Andhra Pradesh, India
- Coordinates: 15.25°N 80.03°E
- Country: India
- State: Andhra Pradesh
- District: Prakasam
- Headquarters: Singarayakonda

Population (2011)
  - Total: 65,784

Languages
  - Official: Telugu
- Time zone: UTC+5:30 (IST)

Singarayakonda mandal is one of the 56 mandals in Prakasam district of the Indian state of Andhra Pradesh. Its headquarters are located at Singarayakonda. The mandal is bounded by Tangutur, Zarugumilli, Kandukur, and Ulavapadu mandals.

== Demographics ==
As of 2011 census, the mandal had a population of 65,784. The total population constitute, 32,495 males and 33,289 females —a sex ratio of 1024 females per 1000 males. 6,937 children are in the age group of 0–6 years, of which 3,597 are boys and 3,340 are girls —a ratio of 929 per 1000. The average literacy rate stands at 79.91% with 38,145 literates.

== Towns and villages ==
Pakala is the most populated village and Kanumalla, is the least populated settlement in the mandal. As of 2011 census, the mandal has 8 settlements, that includes the following towns and villages:

1. Binginapalli
2. Kalikivaya
3. Kanumalla
4. Mulaguntapadu (CT)
5. Pakala
6. Sanampudi
7. Singarayakonda
8. Singarayakonda (RS) (CT)
9. Somarajupalle

Notes:

(CT) – Census town

== See also ==
- Prakasam district
