= Sarangapani =

Sarangapani was a composer of Carnatic music who lived during the 17th century in the village of Karvetinagaram in Andhra Pradesh. He is famous for his composition of Padams, a type of Carnatic song sung during Bharatanatyam performances. Sarangapani was the Minister of Education in the court of the local king Venkata Perumal.

Sarangapani was fluent in both Telugu and Sanskrit and wrote almost 200 Padams in both languages. His songs were written in tribute to the god Venugoplala, the presiding deity of Venugopalaswamy Temple, Karvetinagaram and contain the mudra "Venugopala".

== Compositions ==
#	Composition	Raga	Tāḷa	Language
1	Mogadochi	Sahana	Misra Chapu	Telugu
2	Pattakura	Anandabhairavi	Rupaka	Telugu
3	Upamugane	Yadukulakamboji	Misra Jhampa	Telugu
4	Inchu Boni	Kamavardhani	Adi tala	Telugu
5	Icchina Manchidhe	Dhanyasi	Misra Chapu	Telugu
6	Chittike Vesithe	Kalyani	Adi tala	Telugu
7	Aa Valukanti	Saveri	Triputa	Telugu

== See also ==
- Venugopalaswamy Temple, Karvetinagaram
