= Kanipakam =

- Village
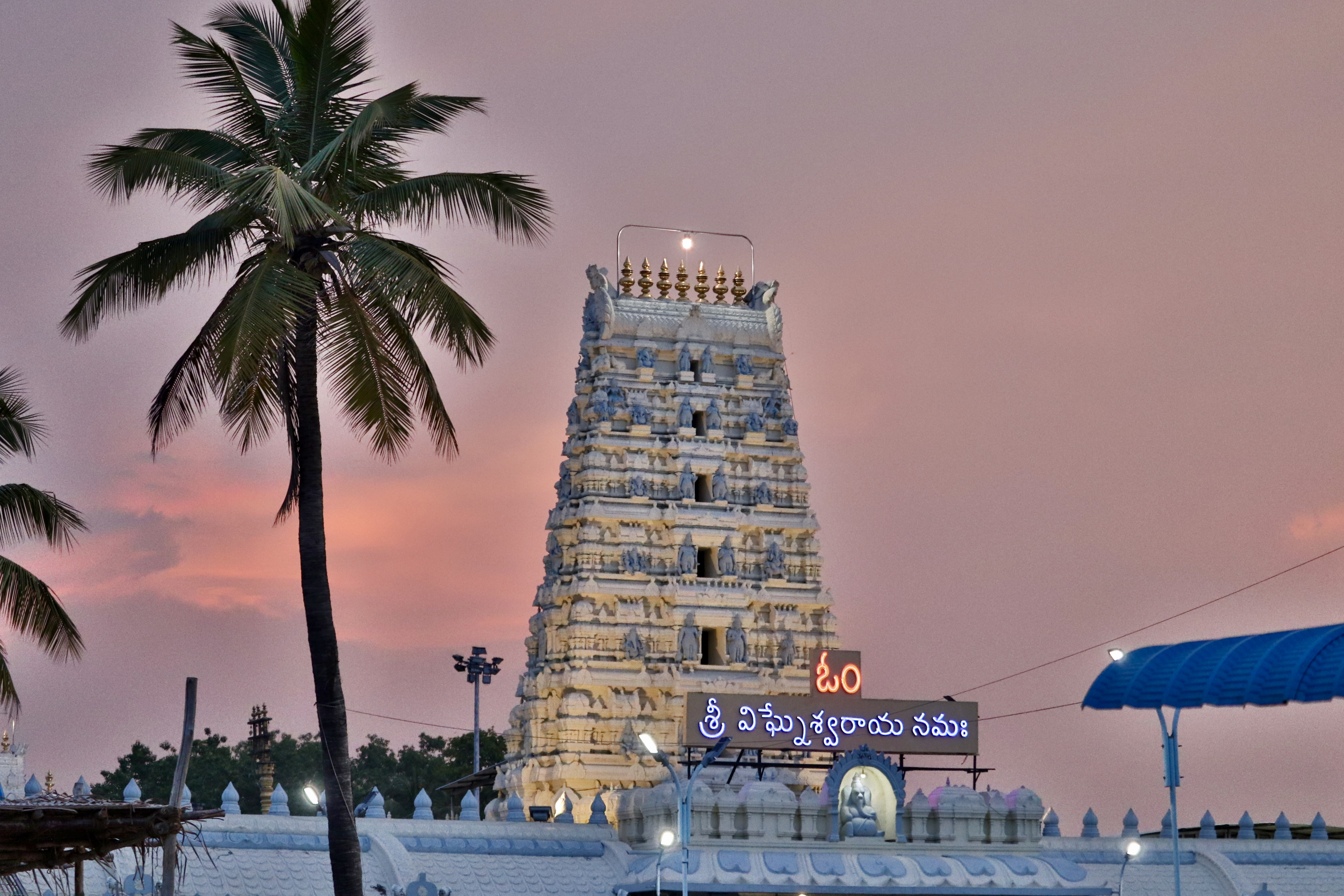
- Kanipakam Temple view
- Interactive map of Kanipakam
- Location in Andhra Pradesh, India Kanipakam (India)
- Coordinates: 13.217096°N 79.100677°E
- Country: India
- State: Andhra Pradesh
- District: Chittoor

Population (2011)
  - Total: 4,960

Languages
  - Official: Telugu
- Time zone: UTC+5:30 (IST)
- Postal code: 517131
- Vehicle registration: AP 03
- Website: Kanipakam Temple

Kanipakam is a minor town in Irala mandal, located in Chittoor district of the Indian state of Andhra Pradesh. Kanipakam is situated at a distance of 11 km from Chittoor town on the Chittoor-Irala road.

== Temple ==
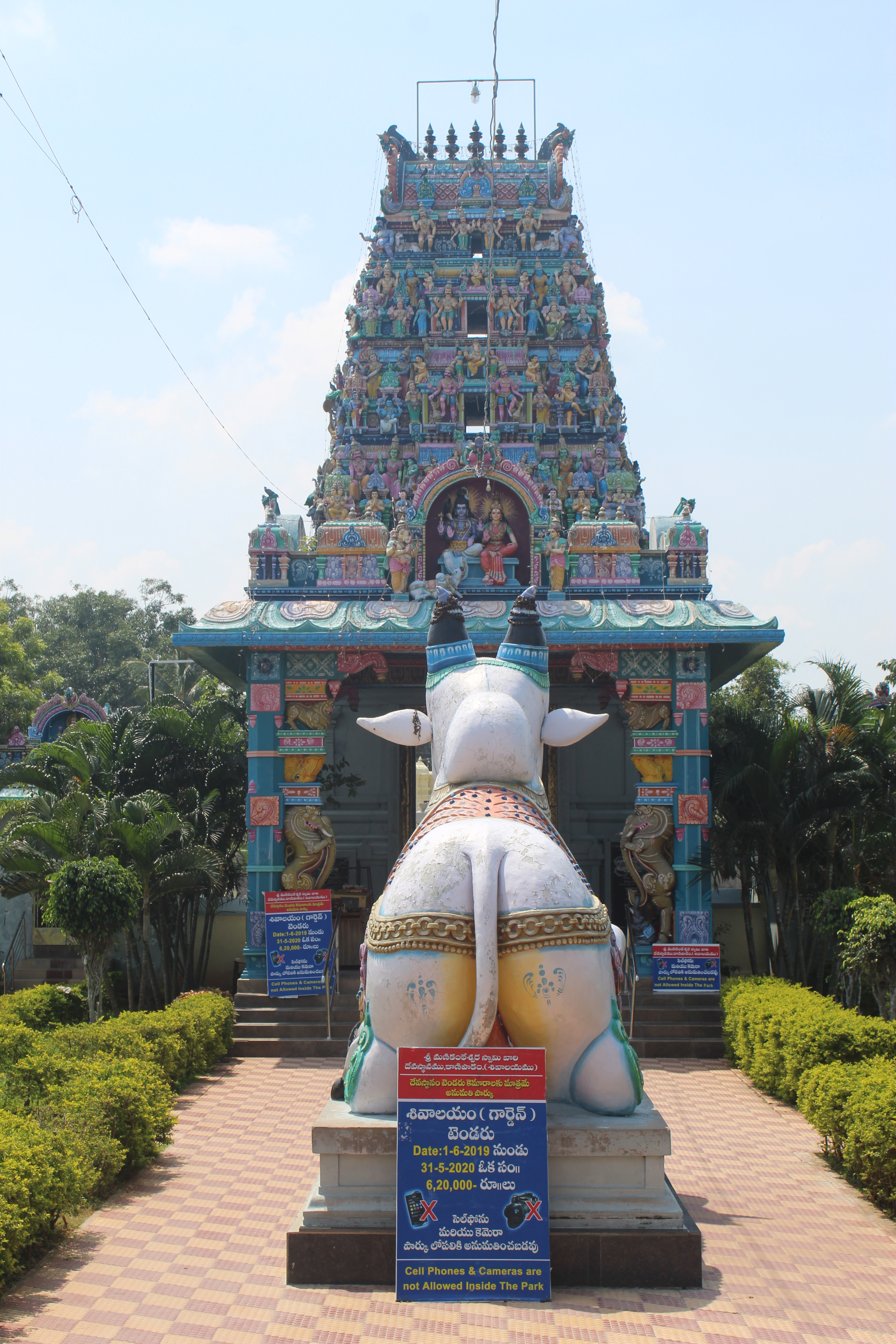
Lord Shiva Temple in Kanipakam

Kanipakam is home to a popular Hindu temple of Lord Ganesha called as Kanipakam Vinayaka Temple. It was constructed in the early 11th century CE by the Chola Emperor Kulottunga I and was expanded further in 1336 by the Emperors of Vijayanagara.

== History ==
According to temple legend, three brothers—one mute, one deaf, and one blind—were digging a well to access water for their crops. When their digging tool struck a rock, blood began to flow from the spot, and miraculously all three were cured of their disabilities. The villagers later discovered that the stone was a self-manifested (Swayambhu) idol of Lord Ganesha. Despite continued excavation, the base of the idol could never be reached, and the well remains full of water throughout the year. Its architectural style reflects the typical South Indian Dravidian design, featuring stone pillars and a towering gopuram.

It is believed that the idol continues to grow in size over time. Devotees note that a silver armor placed on the idol decades ago no longer fits it, reinforcing the widespread belief in the temple’s living divinity.

== Major Festivals ==
Sri Kanipakam Varasiddhi Vinayaka Swamy Annual Brahmotsavam is celebrated every year for a period of 21 days starting from Vinayaka Chavithi day.
