= Tirupati (NMA) =

- Tirupati Neighbourhood
- Location in Andhra Pradesh, India
- Coordinates: 13°39′N 79°25′E
- Country: India
- State: Andhra Pradesh
- District: Tirupati district
- City: Tirupati

Government
  - Body: Tirupati Urban Development Authority(TUDA)

Population (2011)
  - Total: 37,968

Languages
  - Official: Telugu
- Time zone: UTC+5:30 (IST)
- Vehicle registration: AP

Tirupati (NMA) is a neighbourhood located in Tirupati city in Tirupati district in the Indian state of Andhra Pradesh.

== Demographics ==
As of 2011 census, the town had a population of 37,968. The total population constitute, 16,934 males and 21,034 females —a sex ratio of 1242 females per 1000 males and 2,944 children are in the age group of 0–6 years. The average literacy rate stands at 90.17% with 31,582 literates, significantly higher than the state average of 67.41%.

== Education ==
The primary and secondary school education is imparted by government, aided and private schools, under the School Education Department of the state. The medium of instruction followed by different schools are English and Telugu.
