= Thathaiah Kalva =

Thataiah Kalva is a village in Tirupati. It is located in Tirupati district, India. According to the 2011 census it has a population of 333 living in 80 households. Its main agriculture product is rice growing.

== Government ==
Thataiah Kalva is a major village in the Elemandyam gram panchayat in Tirupati district, together with Pillaplem, Kotha Palem, Kura Kalva, Elemandyam, and Marri Gunta. It is part of the Tirupati constituency of Andhra Pradesh state legislature and the Parliament of India in Indian politics.
