= Molagamudi =

- Interactive map of Molagamudi
- Location in Andhra Pradesh
- Coordinates: 13.568285°N 79.510341°E
- State: Andhra Pradesh
- District: Tirupati
- Elevation: 160 m (520 ft)

Languages
  - Official: Telugu,
- Time zone: UTC+5:30 (IST)
- Postal code: 517520
- Telephone code: 0877
- ISO 3166 code: IN-WB
- Vehicle registration: AP-03

Molagamudi is a village in Tirupati. It is situated 10 kilometres (6.2 mi) south-east of Tirupati, Andhra Pradesh, a major pilgrimage and cultural city in the district and the largest city in the Rayalaseema region in the Tirupati district of Andhra Pradesh. The main activity of the village is agriculture.

== Geography and climate ==
Molagamudi is located at the foothills of the Eastern Ghats, part of Rayalaseema region, and lies the extreme south of the Andhra Pradesh state.

The climate in Molagamudi is tropical. The temperatures are relatively lower than in the eastern parts of the Tirupati district. During the summer, usually from March to June, the temperatures are around 37 °C (99 °F). The rainy season starts in late June or early July, but monsoons, from south west (from June to September) and north east (from October to December), remain moderate. In winter, which lasts till the end of February, the minimum temperatures range form 16 to 19 °C (61 to 66 °F). The average rainfall received by the village in one year is around 950 millimetres (37 in).
