= Singarayakonda =

- Town
- Location in Andhra Pradesh, India
- Coordinates: 15°15′00″N 80°01′13″E
- Country: India
- State: Andhra Pradesh
- District: Prakasam

Government
  - Type: State Government
  - Member of Parliament: Magunta Sreenivasulu Reddy (YSRCP)
  - Member of Legislative Assembly: Dola Sree Bala Veeranjaneya Swamy (TDP)

Area
  - Total: 11.20 km^{2} (4.32 sq mi)
- Elevation: 15 m (49 ft)

Population (2011)
  - Total: 19,400
  - Density: 1,730/km^{2} (4,490/sq mi)

Languages
  - Official: Telugu
- Time zone: UTC+5:30 (IST)
- PIN: 523101
- Telephone code: +91 8598
- Vehicle registration: AP27&AP39

Singarayakonda is a town in Prakasam district of the Indian state of Andhra Pradesh. It is the mandal headquarters of Singarayakonda mandal. Singarayakonda is located at sea level. It is spread across 10 Grama panchayats. It is under Ongole Revenue division. Singarayakonda is located 27 kilometers from Ongole. This is situated on the NH-65 Highway and has a connectivity of the Railway line between Vijayawada, vishakapatnam, Bangalore, Hyderabad, Kerala,and Chennai. This gives highest revenue than any other station in this line of South Central Railway in the Prakasam district. This also has been the center for transportation for all the nearby villages which are located around a distance of the 15 kilometres (9.3 mi) from this place.

== History ==
Sri Varaha Lakshmi Narasimha Swamy Temple Singarayakonda is one of the Holy abodes of Lord Narasimha Swamy.

As per the legends, this region was ruled by Demon Kharasura, who established a vast Kharati Dynasty. He was an ardent devotee of Lord Narasimha who used to visit this place daily for Lord Narasimha Darshan. One day, when Kharasura requested the Lord for a boon, Narasimha replied him that he would grant the boon in his Rama Avatar (An Incarnation of Lord Vishnu). Angered Kharasura started interrupting Yajnas and Homam of the Sages. When Rama exiled him from the kingdom, during his journey towards the south, Sages requested Rama to guard their Yajna. When Rama came across Kharasura who a devotee of Narasimha, Rama installed and offered prayers to Lord Narasimha before killing the demon.

"ఎలాంటి సింహాలకైనా రాయడైన నరసింహస్వామి వెలసిన కొండకనుక అది సింగరాయకొండ గా పిలవపడుతుంది"

== Geography ==
Singarayakonda is located at 15.25°N 80.03°E. It has an average elevation of 15 metres (49 feet).

=== Climate ===
Singarayakonda's climate is classified as tropical. In winter, there is much less rainfall in Singarayakonda than in summer. This location is classified as Aw by Köppen and Geiger. The temperature here averages 28.7 °C (83.7 °F). In a year, the average rainfall is 858 mm. Precipitation is the lowest in February, with an average of 3 mm. With an average of 231 mm, the most precipitation falls in October. At an average temperature of 33.3 °C (91.9 °F), May is the hottest month of the year. January has the lowest average temperature of the year. It is 24.3 °C (75.7 °F).

Climate data for Singarayakonda
	January	February	March	April	May	June	July	August	September	October	November	December
Avg. Temperature (°C)	24.3	25.9	28.1	30.6	33.3	32.9	30.5	30.3	29.9	28.2	25.8	24.3
Min. Temperature (°C)	19.7	20.9	23.3	26	28	28.3	26.5	26.3	25.9	24.6	21.9	20
Max. Temperature (°C)	29	31	33	35.2	38.6	37.5	34.5	34.3	33.9	31.9	29.7	28.6
Avg. Temperature (°F)	75.7	78.6	82.6	87.1	91.9	91.2	86.9	86.5	85.8	82.8	78.4	75.7
Min. Temperature (°F)	67.5	69.6	73.9	78.8	82.4	82.9	79.7	79.3	78.6	76.3	71.4	68.0
Max. Temperature (°F)	84.2	87.8	91.4	95.4	101.5	99.5	94.1	93.7	93.0	89.4	85.5	83.5
Precipitation / Rainfall (mm)	5	3	5	13	43	57	86	91	124	231	153	47

Between the driest and wettest months, the difference in precipitation is 228 mm. During the year, the average temperatures vary by 9.0 °C (48.2 °F).

== Demographics ==
As of 2011 India census, Singarayakonda had a population of 28,675. Males constitute 48% of the population and females 52%. Singarayakonda has an average literacy rate of 68%, higher than the national average of 59.5%: male literacy is 73%, and female literacy is 61%. In Singarayakonda, 11% of the population is under 6 years of age.

=== Religion ===
Singarayakonda Religion Population As per the Census India 2011
1. Hinduism (88.2%)
2. Islam (10.2%)
3. Sikhism (0.02%)
4. Jainism (0.00%)
5. Christianity (0.61%)
6. Buddhism (0.01%)
7. Other or Not stated (0.43%)

Singarayakonda Religion Population on Pie Chart

== Transport ==
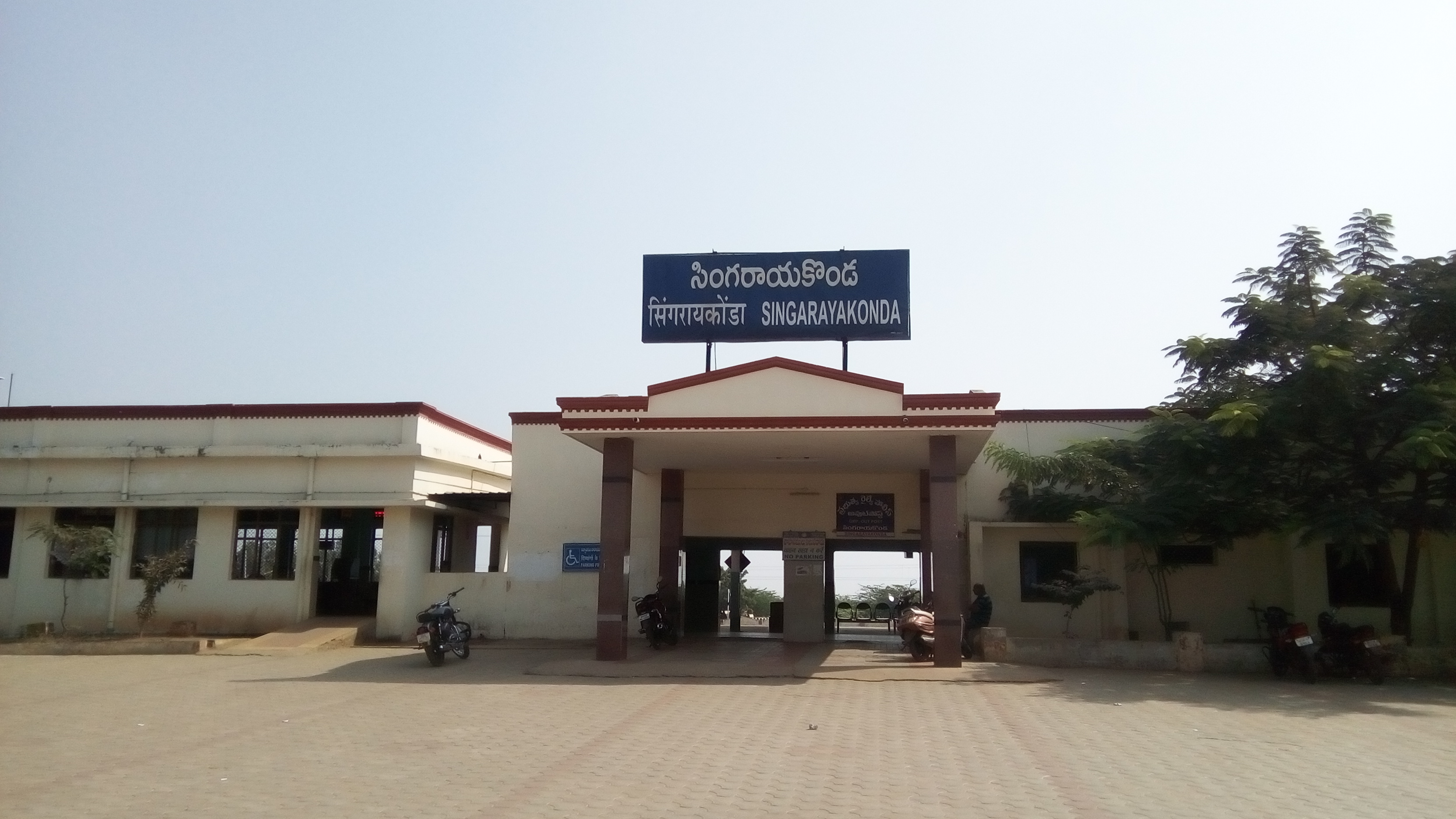
Singarayakonda_Railway_Station

=== Roadways ===
The town is connected by road to major destinations. National Highway 16, a part of highway network, bypasses the town. Singarayakonda bus station is owned and operated by Andhra Pradesh State Road Transport Corporation. Singarayakonda bus station is a major diversion bus stand to kandukur. The private transport like autos play major role in town.

=== Railways ===
Singarayakonda railway station is classified as a B–category station in the Vijayawada railway division of South Central Railway zone.
