= Tirupati Rural mandal =

- Mandal
- Interactive Map Outlining mandal
- Location in Andhra Pradesh, India Tirupati Rural mandal (India)
- Coordinates: 13°33′50″N 79°22′58″E
- Country: India
- State: Andhra Pradesh
- District: Tirupati
- Headquarters: Tiruchanur, Tirupati

Government
  - MLA: Arani Sreenivasulu (JSP)
  - MP: Dr.M.Gurumoorthy

Area
  - Mandal: 112 km^{2} (43 sq mi)

Population (2011)
  - Mandal: 117,445
  - Density: 1,050/km^{2} (2,720/sq mi)
  - Urban: 66,974
  - Rural: 50,471

Languages
  - Official: Telugu
- Time zone: UTC+05:30 (IST)

Tirupati Rural mandal is one of the 36 mandals in Tirupati district of Andhra Pradesh in India. It is under the administration of Tirupati revenue division and the headquarters are located at Tirupati.

== History ==
The mandal was a part of Chittoor district and was made a part of the newly formed Tirupati district on 4 April 2022 as part of reorganisation of the districts in the state by the Government of Andhra Pradesh.

== Geography ==
The mandal is bounded by Chandragiri mandal, Ramachandrapuram mandal, Renigunta mandal, Tirupati (urban) mandal and Vadamalapeta mandal.

== Demographics ==
Religions in Tirupati (rural) mandal (2011)
Religion	Percent
Hindus	95.71%
Muslims	3.45%
Christians	0.56%
Others or not stated	0.28%
Distribution of religions

As per 2011 census, the mandal had a total population of 117,445 with 59,449 male population and 57,996 female population with a density of 1,049/km^{2}. It had a sex ratio of 976. Scheduled Castes and Scheduled Tribes made up 18,934 and 3,933 of the population respectively. It had a literacy rate of 75.74% with 82.62% among males and 68.72% among females.

== Administration ==
The mandal is a part of the Tirupati revenue division. The headquarters are located at Tirupati. As of 2011 census, the mandal comprises the following villages:

1. Avilala
2. Brahmana Pattu
3. C.Mallavaram
4. Cherlopalle
5. Chiguruwada
6. Durga Samudram
7. Gandhipuram
8. Gollapalle
9. Kuntrapakam
10. Kupu Chandrapeta
11. Lingeshwar Nagar
12. Mallam Gunta
13. Mangalam
14. Mundlapudi
15. Oteru
16. Padipeta
17. Padhmavathipuram
18. Paidipalle
19. Patha Kalva
20. Perumallapalle
21. Perur
22. Pudipatla
23. Ramanujapalle
24. Ranadheerpuram
25. Sainagar
26. Sapthagiri Colony
27. Settipalle
28. Srinivasapuram
29. Thanapalle
30. Thummala Gunta
31. Tiruchanur
32. Tirumala Nagar
33. Vedanthapuram
34. Venkatapathi Nagar
- Source: Election Commission 2021 (Villages)
- Source: Revenue Department of AP

== Politics ==
The mandal is one of the 2 mandals under Tirupati Assembly constituency, which in turn is a part of Tirupati Lok Sabha constituency of Andhra Pradesh. As of 1 January 2018, the mandal has 92,775 eligible voters with 46,173 male and 46,602 female voters. Aarani Srinivasulu is representing the Tirupati constituency as the Member of the Legislative Assembly (MLA) in Andhra Pradesh Legislative Assembly, and Dr.M.Gurumurthy is representing the Tirupati constituency as the Member of Parliament (MP) in Lok Sabha.
