= Gajularega =

Village in Andhra Pradesh, India

- village
- Interactive map of Gajularega
- Location in Andhra Pradesh, India Gajularega (India)
- Coordinates: 18.1167°N 83.4167°E
- Country: India
- State: Andhra Pradesh
- District: Vizianagaram

Population (2001)
  - Total: 13,078

Languages
  - Official: Telugu
- Time zone: UTC+5:30 (IST)
- Vehicle registration: AP

Gajularega is a census town in Vizianagaram district in the state of Andhra Pradesh, India.

== Demographics ==
As of 2001 India census, Gajularega had a population of 13,078. Males constitute 50% of the population and females 50%. Gajularega has an average literacy rate of 60%, higher than the national average of 59.5%: male literacy is 69%, and female literacy is 51%. In Gajularega, 13% of the population is under 6 years of age.
