= Sreepathi Rao Peta =

Sripathi Rao Peta
- Village
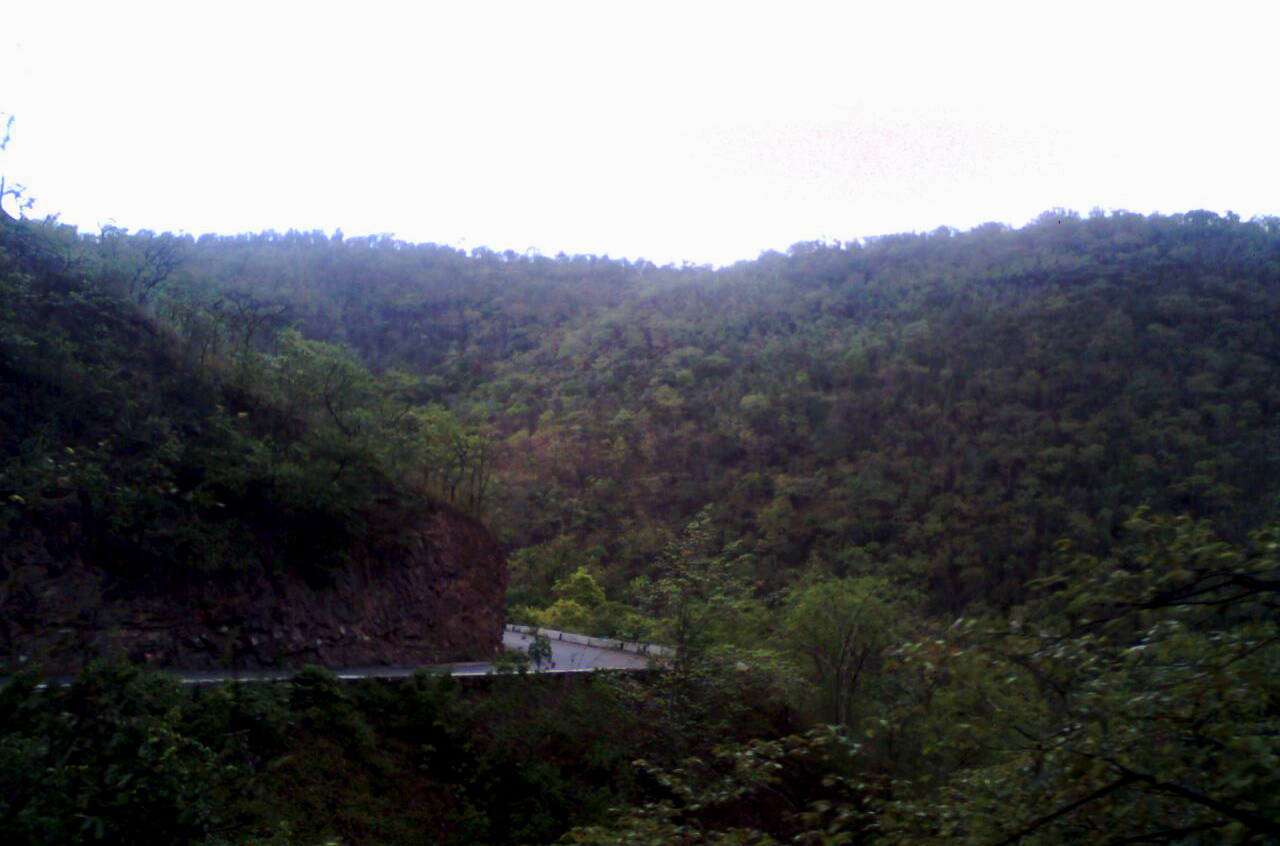
- Nallamalla hills near Village
- Interactive map of Sripathi Rao Peta
- Location in Andhra Pradesh, India
- Country: India
- State: Andhra Pradesh
- District: Nandyal
- Mandal: Atmakur

Population
  - Total: 7,000

Languages
  - Official: Telugu
- Time zone: UTC+5:30 (IST)
- PIN: 518422
- Telephone code: 08517

Sripathi Rao Peta is a village in Atmakur mandal, Nandyal district of Andhra Pradesh state in southern India, about 284 km from Hyderabad.

== Political administration ==
One of the Gram Panchayat at Atmakur mandal in Nandyal district
