= Vinayaka Temple, Kanipakam =

Hindu temple in India

Sri Varasidhi Vinayaka Temple
- Svayambhu Sri Varasidhi Vinayaka Temple
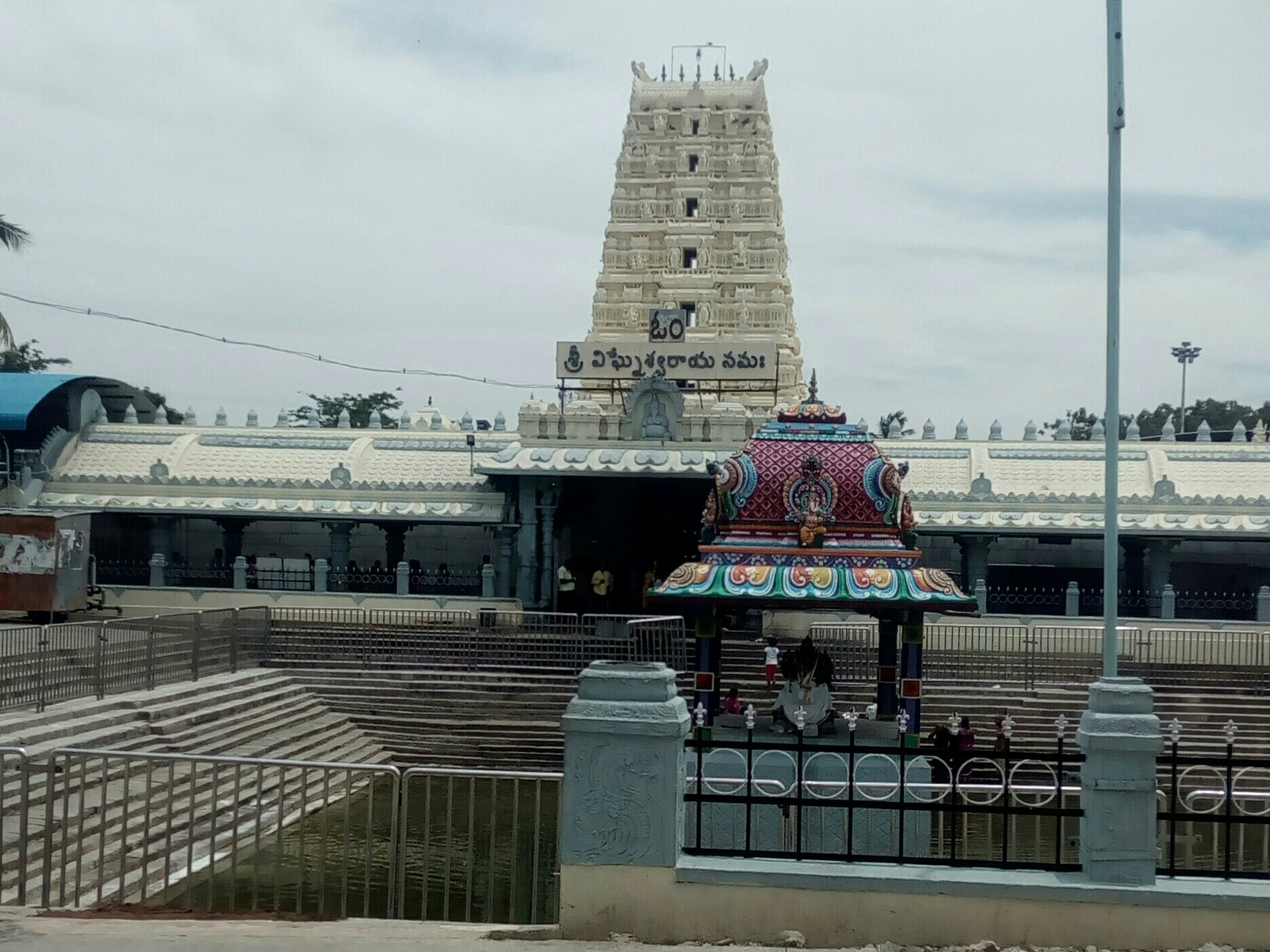
- Kanipakam temple entrance and koneru in front

Religion
- Affiliation: Hinduism
- District: Chittoor district
- Deity: Ganesha
- Festival: Vinayaka Chavithi

Location
- Location: Kanipakam
- State: Andhra Pradesh
- Country: India
- Interactive map of Sri Varasidhi Vinayaka Temple

Architecture
- Type: Dravidian architecture
- Completed: 11th century CE

Website
- Kanipakam Temple

Sri Varasidhi Vinayaka Swamy Temple is a Hindu temple of Ganesha. It is located at Kanipakam in Chittoor district of Andhra Pradesh, India. The temple is about 11 km from Chittoor and 68 km from Tirupati.

== Legend ==
According to legend, there were three brothers who were mute, deaf and blind. They were digging a well to fetch water to their field. The device they were using fell into the well hitting hard object. When they dug further, blood started to gush out of the well and the three got rid of their disabilities. The villagers rushed to the spot and found deity of Ganesha. Villagers dug further, but they were not able to find the base of the deity. The deity sits in the well which is always full of water.

The idol has apparently gotten larger over time. This is evidenced by the fact that a silver armour of the deity from 50 year ago, doesn't fit today. Currently only the knee and abdomen of the deity is visible.

== History ==
The temple was constructed in the early 11th century CE by the Chola Emperor Kulottunga I and was expanded further in 1336 by the Emperors of Vijayanagara.

== Presiding deity ==
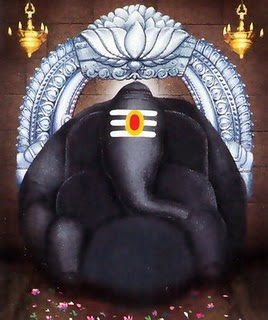
The deity of Vinayaka in the Temple

Vinayaka is the presiding deity of the temple. As per legend, it is believed that the deity is Svayambhu(Self-manifested). The deity is seen in the well, full of water always.

== Administration ==
The temple is under the control of Endowments department of Andhra Pradesh which will appoint a trust board of 15 members to administer the temple.

== Festivals ==
Annual brahmotsavams will be celebrated for 21 days starting from Vinayaka chavithi day. The processional deity of Vinayaka will be taken in a procession on different vahanams on these days amidst large number of pilgrims across the country.

== In popular culture ==
- The Kanipakam Temple is one of the seven holy places visited by the children in the 2000 Telugu movie Devullu.
