= Chinnagottigallu mandal =

Mandal in Tirupati district, Andhra Pradesh, India

- Mandal
- Interactive map of Chinnagottigallu mandal
- Location within Andhra Pradesh Location within India
- Coordinates: 13°38′6″N 79°5′42″E
- Country: India
- State: Andhra Pradesh
- District: Tirupati
- Revenue division: Tirupati
- Headquarters: Chinnagottigallu

Government
  - MLA: Pulivarthi Venkata Mani Prasad (TDP)
  - MP: Daggumalla Prasada Rao

Area
  - Mandal: 180 km^{2} (69 sq mi)

Population (2011)
  - Mandal: 26,150
  - Density: 150/km^{2} (380/sq mi)
  - Urban: 0
  - Rural: 26,150
- Time zone: UTC+05:30 (IST)

Chinnagottigallu mandal is one of the 36 mandals in Tirupati district in the Indian state of Andhra Pradesh. It is a part of Tirupati revenue division with its headquarters at Chinnagottigallu.

== History ==
Chinnagottigallu mandal was a part of Chittoor district under Madanapalle revenue division until 2022. It was made part of the newly formed Tirupati district under Tirupati revenue division effective from 4 April 2022 by the Government of Andhra Pradesh.

== Demographics ==
Religions in Chinnagottigallu mandal (2011)
| Religion | Percent |
| Hindus | 85.87% |
| Muslims | 13.76% |
| Christians | 0.27% |
| Others or not stated | 0.1% |
Distribution of religions

As per 2011 census, Chinnagottigallu mandal had a total population of 26,150 with 13,021 male population and 13,129 female population with a density of 145/km^{2}. It had a sex ratio of 1008. Scheduled Castes and Scheduled Tribes made up 4,702 and 905 of the population respectively. It had a literacy rate of 66.67% with 76.97% among males and 56.45% among females.

== Administration ==
Chinnagottigallu mandal is a part of Tirupati revenue division. Its headquarters are located at Chinnagottigallu. As of 2011 census, the mandal comprises the following 10 villages:

Village
Bhakarapet
Chattevaripalem
Chinnagottigallu
Chittecherla
Devarakonda
Diguvuru
Kotabylu
Rangannagari Gadda
Thippireddigaripalle
Yeguvuru

== Politics ==
Chinnagottigallu mandal is one of the 7 mandals under Chandragiri Assembly constituency, which in turn is a part of Chittoor Lok Sabha constituency of Andhra Pradesh. As of 1 January 2018, the mandal had 18,592 eligible voters with 9,179 male voters and 9,412 female voters. Pulivarthi Venkata Mani Prasad is representing the Chandragiri constituency as the Member of the Legislative Assembly (MLA) in Andhra Pradesh Legislative Assembly, and Daggumalla Prasada Rao is representing the Chittoor constituency as the Member of Parliament (MP) in Lok Sabha.
