= Chandragiri =

- Village
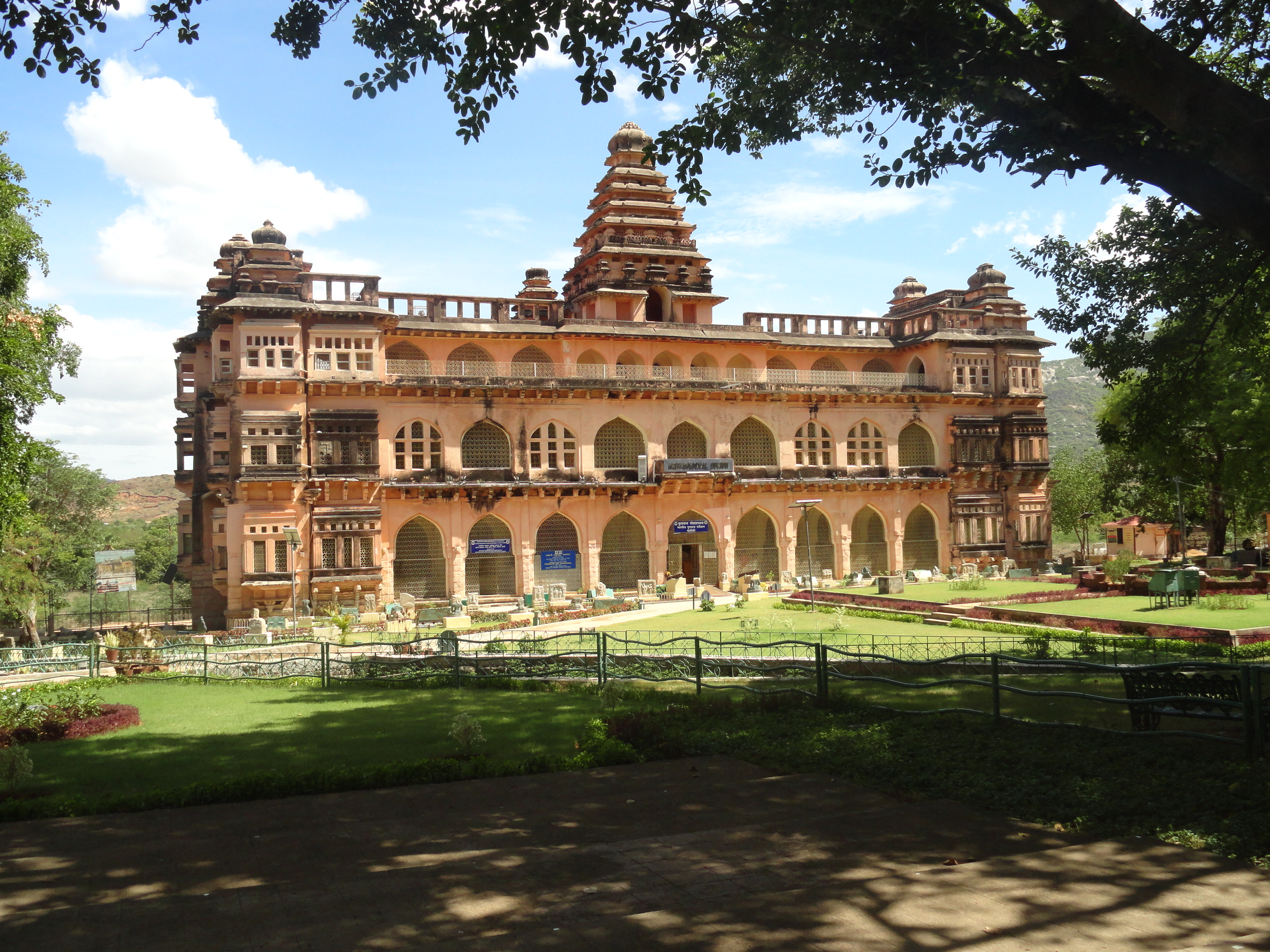
- Raja Mahal, Chandragiri

- Location in Andhra Pradesh, India Chandragiri (India)
- Coordinates: 13.5833°N 79.3167°E
- Country: India
- State: Andhra Pradesh
- District: Tirupati district

Government
  - Body: Tirupati Urban Development Authority(TUDA)

Area
  - Total: 19.56 km^{2} (7.55 sq mi)

Population (2022)
  - Total: 31,220
  - Density: 1,596/km^{2} (4,134/sq mi)

Languages
  - Official: Telugu
- Time zone: UTC+5:30 (IST)
- PIN: 517101
- Telephone code: +91–877

Chandragiri is a village located in Chandragiri mandal, Tirupati district of the Indian state of Andhra Pradesh. It is a part of Tirupati Urban Development Authority It is the mandal headquarters of Chandragiri mandal in Tirupati revenue division. It also falls in the jurisdictional limit of Tirupati Urban Development Authority. Chandragiri is the southwestern entrance of Tirupati for vehicles coming from Bangalore, Kerala and Tamil Nadu. Kalyana Venkateswara Temple, Srinivasamangapuram is located next to Chandragiri through which well-laid stone footpaths called Srivari Mettu are available to reach Tirumala on foot.

== History ==
=== Chandragiri fort ===
Chandragiri is now famous for the historical fort, built in the 11th century by Immadi Narasimha Yadava Raya and the Raja Mahal (Palace) within it. The fort encircles eight ruined temples of Saivite and Vaishnavite pantheons, Raja Mahal, Rani Mahal and other ruined structures.

The Raja Mahal Palace is now an archaeological museum. The fort and palace are in the care of the Archaeological Survey of India. The palace is open to the public, but the fort is closed. The palace is an example of Indo-Sarcen architecture of the Vijayanagar period. The palace was constructed using stone, brick, lime mortar and devoid of timber. The crowning towers represents the Hindu architectural elements.

Chandragiri was under the rule of Vijayanagar from 1367. It came into prominence during the rule of Saluva Narasimha Raya. Chandragiri was the 4th capital of Vijayanagar Empire. Rayas shifted their capital to here when Golconda sultans attacked Penukonda. In 1646, the fort was annexed to the Golkonda territory.

After the decline of the Vijayanagara Empire, the Mysore King ordered the palaygara Bisaya Nayaka of Harapanayakanahalli (present Mulbagal, Karnataka) to wage a war against the Sultan of Chandragiri. In the battle, his army was reported to have killed everyone inside the fort. There is also a myth that out of the wealth collected from the Muslim women in the fort, their nose rings alone filled 3 whole bamboo buckets, which were then sealed in a two-stone locker and placed in Kurudumale, (in Karnataka) With the Sultan's death, Chandragiri fell under Mysore suzerainty. It went into oblivion from 1792 onward.
