= Tirupati Urban mandal =

- Mandal
- Interactive map of Tirupati Urban mandal
- Location in Andhra Pradesh, India
- Coordinates: 13.65°N 79.4167°E
- Country: India
- State: Andhra Pradesh
- District: Tirupati
- Headquarters: Tirupati
  - Rank: 2011

Languages
  - Official: Telugu
- Time zone: UTC+5:30 (IST)

Tirupati Urban mandal is one of the 36 mandals in Tirupati district of the Indian state of Andhra Pradesh. It has its headquarters at Tirupati city in Tirupati district. The mandal is bounded by Chandragiri, Tirupati (rural) and Koduru mandals.

== History ==
It was a part of Chittoor district and was made a part of the newly formed Tirupati district on 4 April 2022 as part of district reorganisation.

== Demographics ==
As of 2011 census, the mandal had a population of 407,232. The total population constitute, 204,278 males and 202,954 females —a sex ratio of 994 females per 1000 males. 38,691 children are in the age group of 0–6 years, of which 20,103 are boys and 18,588 are girls —a ratio of 925 per 1000. The average literacy rate stands at 85.27% with 314,249 literates.

== Towns and villages ==
As of 2011 census, the mandal has 9 settlements. The settlements in the mandal are listed below:

1. Akkarampalle (CT)
2. Chennayyagunta
3. Konkachennaiahgunta
4. Mangalam (CT)
5. Settipalle (OG)
6. Timminaidupalle (OG)
7. Tirumala (CT)
8. Tirupati (MC)
9. Tirupati (NMA) (CT)

Note: CT–Census town, M–Municipality, MC–Municipal corporation, OG–Out Growth

== See also ==
- List of mandals in Andhra Pradesh
