= Puttur, Tirupati district =

Puttur
- Town
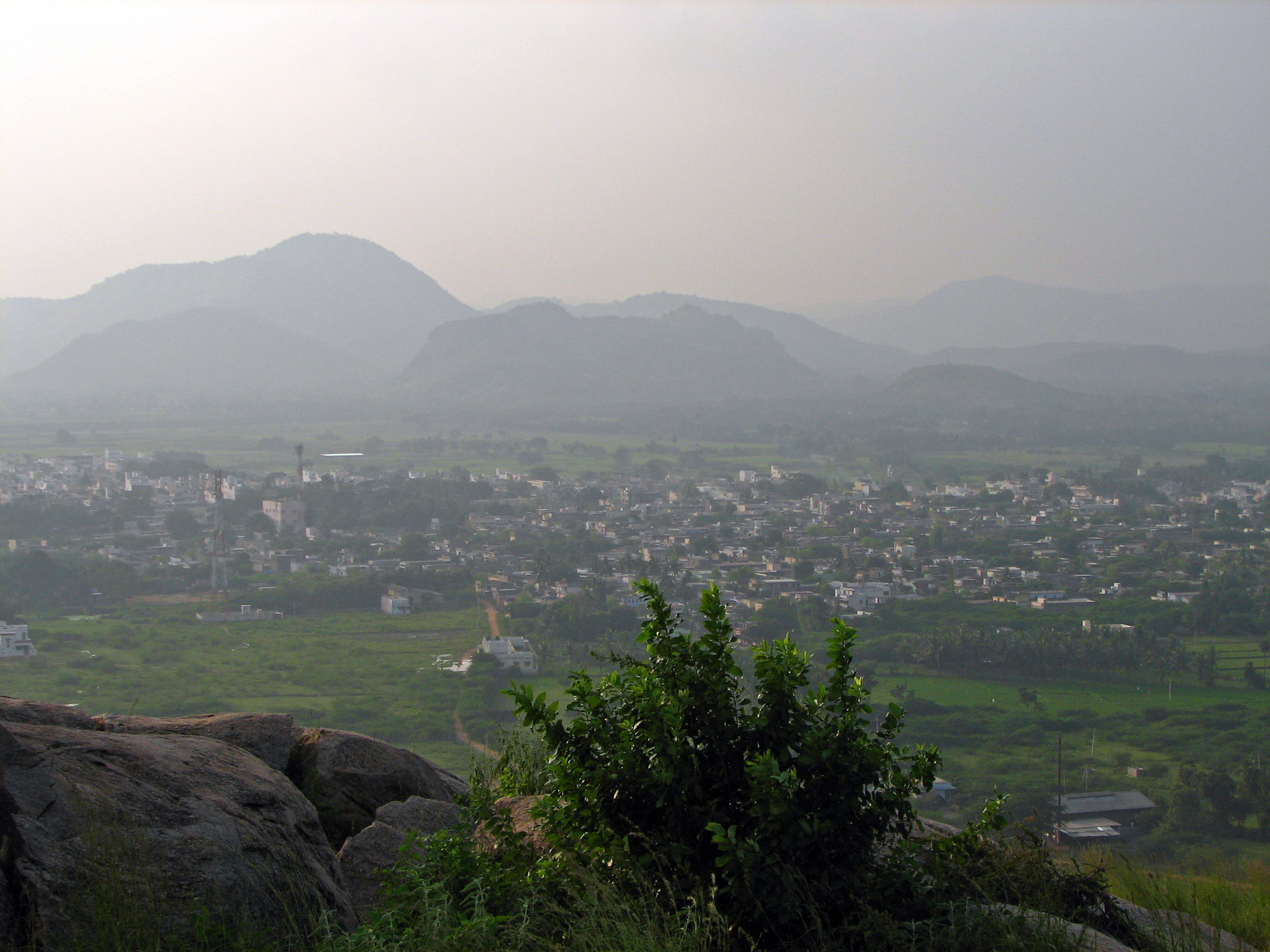
- Puttur Town

- Location in Andhra Pradesh, India
- Coordinates: 13.45°N 79.55°E
- Country: India
- State: Andhra Pradesh
- District: Tirupati
- Mandal: Puttur

Government
  - Type: Municipality
  - Body: Puttur municipality,Tirupati Urban Development Authority(TUDA)

Area
  - Total: 43.29 km^{2} (16.71 sq mi)

Population (2011)
  - Total: 54,092
  - Density: 1,250/km^{2} (3,236/sq mi)

Languages
  - Official: Telugu
- Time zone: UTC+5:30 (IST)
- PIN: 517583
- Telephone code: +91–8577
- Vehicle registration: AP-03
- Railway Station: Puttur Railway station

Puttur is a town in Tirupati district of the Indian state of Andhra Pradesh. It is the mandal headquarters of Puttur mandal in Tirupati revenue division. It is known for a traditional method of splinting/bandaging bone fractures.

== Geography ==
Puttur is located at 13.43°N 79.55°E. It has an average elevation of 144 metres (472 feet). It is located 100 km from Chennai and 40 km from Tirupati city. It falls on the Mumbai- Chennai railway route. As it is located at the Andhra Pradesh and Tamil Nadu border, people speak Telugu and Tamil in this region.

== Education ==
Puttur serves near by 6 major mandals. Puttur consists of 10 ZPHS government Schools, 12 MPPS schools, many private schools and many junior and degree colleges along with 3 major Engineering colleges under the School Education Department of the state.

== See also ==
- List of municipalities in Andhra Pradesh
