= Vadamalapeta mandal =

Mandal in Tirupati district, Andhra Pradesh, India

- Mandal
- Interactive map of Vadamalapeta mandal
- Location in Andhra Pradesh, India
- Country: India
- State: Andhra Pradesh
- District: Tirupati
- Revenue division: Tirupati
- Headquarters: Vadamalapeta

Languages
  - Official: Telugu
- Time zone: UTC+05:30 (IST)

Vadamalapeta mandal is one of the 36 mandals in Tirupati district of Andhra Pradesh in India. It has its headquarters at Vadamalapeta village and is part of Tirupati revenue division.

== History ==
The mandal was a part of Chittoor district and was made part of the newly formed Tirupati district on 4 April 2022 as part of district reorganisation.
