= Pulivarthi Nani =

Indian politician

Pulivarthi Venkata Mani Prasad

Member of Legislative Assembly, Andhra Pradesh
- Incumbent
- Assumed office 2024
- Preceded by: Chevireddy Bhaskar Reddy
- Constituency: Chandragiri

Personal details
- Party: Telugu Desam Party

Pulivarthi Venkata Mani Prasad, better known as Pulivarthi Nani, is an Indian politician and present Member of the Andhra Pradesh Legislative Assembly from 2024, representing Chandragiri Assembly constituency. He belongs to Telugu Desam Party.
