= Tirupati revenue division =

Tirupati revenue division తిరుపతి ఆదాయ విభాగం
- Revenue division in Tirupati district
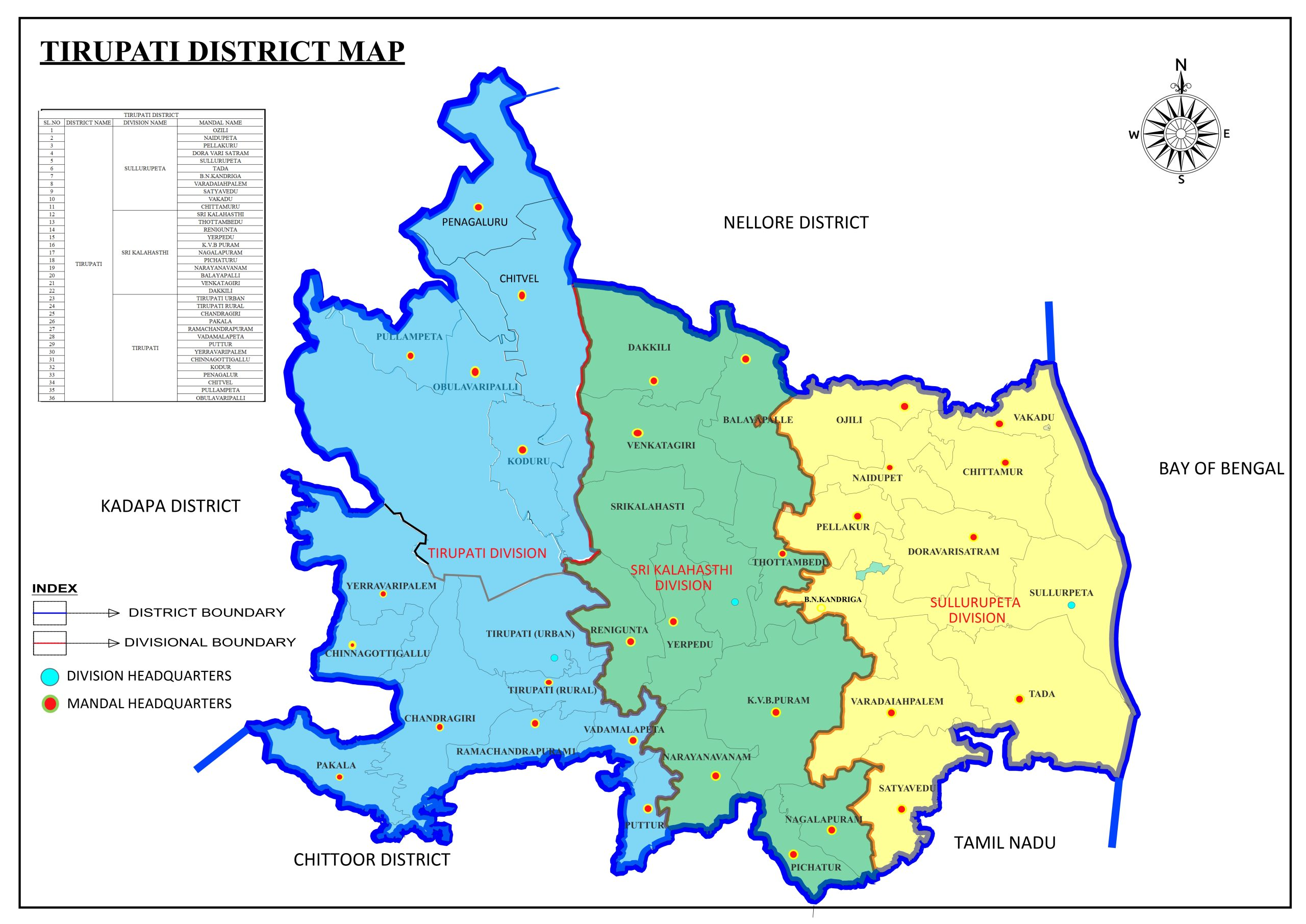
- Tirupati revenue division in Tirupati district
- Country: India
- State: Andhra Pradesh
- District: Tirupati
- Headquarters: Tirupati
- Time zone: UTC+05:30 (IST)

Tirupati revenue division is an administrative division in the Tirupati district of the Indian state of Andhra Pradesh. It is one of the 3 revenue divisions in the district with 14 mandals under its administration. Tirupati serves as the headquarters of the division. The division has 1 municipalities and 1 municipal corporation.

== History ==
The revenue division was originally a part of Chittoor district and was made part of the newly formed Tirupati district on 4 April 2022. On 31 Dec 2025 additionally there are four mandals added from Annamayya district to this revenue division .

== Administration ==
The details of the mandals and urban settlements in the division are:

Mandals	Chandragiri, Chinnagottigallu, Chitvel, Railway Koduru, Obulavaripalle, Pakala, Penagalur, Pullampeta, Puttur, Ramachandrapuram, Tirupati Rural, Tirupati Urban, Vadamalapeta, Yerravaripalem.
Municipal corporation	Tirupati
Municipality	Puttur

== See also ==
- List of revenue divisions in Andhra Pradesh
- List of mandals in Andhra Pradesh
- Tirupati district
- Sullurupeta revenue division
- Srikalahasti revenue division
- Tirupati
