= Tirupati Urban Development Authority =

- TUDA Logo

Agency overview
- Formed: 1981
- Type: Urban Planning Agency
- Jurisdiction: Government of Andhra Pradesh
- Headquarters: Tirupati; 13.65°N 79.42°E
- Minister responsible: Municipal Administration and Urban Development Department, Andhra Pradesh
- Agency executive: Dr.C.Divakar Reddy, Chairman
- Parent agency: Government of Andhra Pradesh
- Website: TUDA

The Tirupati Urban Development Authority (TUDA) is a government agency and the principal planning authority for Tirupati and its neighbourhood areas in Tirupati District and Chittoor district partially of the Indian state of Andhra Pradesh. It was notified on 6 November 1981 by the Government of Andhra Pradesh as per Andhra Pradesh Urban Areas Development Act 1975 and is headquartered at Tirupati. At present it covers the jurisdictional area of 4,527 km^{2} (1,748 sq mi), which covers Tirupati, Tirumala, Renigunta, Chandragiri, Yerpedu, Puttur, Sri Kalahasti, Nagari, Sathyavedu, Karvetinagaram and 160 surrounding villages.
