= M. Sunil Kumar =

Indian politician

M. Sunil Kumar (born 1970) is an Indian politician from Andhra Pradesh. He was a former member of the Andhra Pradesh Legislative Assembly from Puthalapattu Assembly constituency which is reserved for the Scheduled Caste comminity in Chittoor district representing the YSR Congress Party.

== Early life ==
Kumar is from Puthalapattu, Chittoor district, Andhra Pradesh. He is the son of M.Raghgunathaiah. He completed his MBBS at University of Health Sciences, Vijayawada, in 2003. He and his wife are doctors. He declared assets worth Rs.90 lakhs in 2014 and Rs.4 crore in 2024, in his affidavits to the Election Commission of India.

== Career ==
Kumar won from Puthalapattu Assembly constituency in the 2014 Andhra Pradesh Legislative Assembly election representing the YSR Congress. He polled 83,200 votes and defeated his nearest rival, Lalitha Kumari of the Telugu Desam Party, by a margin of 902 votes. He was denied a ticket in the 2019 elections but contested again on YSRCP ticket in 2024 Andhra Pradesh Legislative Assembly election but polled only 86,503 votes and lost to Kalikiri Murali Mohan of the TDP, by a margin of 15,634 votes.
