= Chittoor Lok Sabha constituency =

Constituency in Andhra Pradesh, India

Coordinates: 13°09′00″N 78°58′12″E

Chittoor AP-25
- Lok Sabha constituency
- Interactive Map Outlining Chittoor Lok Sabha constituency

Constituency details
- Country: India
- Region: South India
- State: Andhra Pradesh
- Assembly constituencies: Chandragiri; Nagari; Gangadhara Nellore; Chittoor; Puthalapattu; Palamaner; Kuppam
- Established: 1951
- Total electors: 16,40,202 (2024)
- Reservation: SC

Member of Parliament
- 18th Lok Sabha
- Incumbent Daggumalla Prasada Rao
- Party: TDP
- Alliance: NDA
- Elected year: 2024
- Preceded by: N. Reddeppa

Chittoor Lok Sabha constituency is one of the twenty-five lok sabha constituencies of Andhra Pradesh in India. It comprises seven assembly segments and belongs to Chittor and Tirupati districts. Daggumalla Prasada Rao is the present MP of the constituency representing Telugu Desam Party.

Most Successful parties from Chittor Lok Sabha
1. INC (9 Times) (50.0%)
2. TDP (8 Times) (44.4%)
3. YSRCP (1 time) (5.60%)

== Assembly segments ==
Chittoor constituency comprises the following Legislative Assembly segments:

| # | Name | District | Members | Party | Leading (in 2024) |
|---|---|---|---|---|---|
| 166 | Chandragiri | Tirupati | Pulivarthi Venkata Mani Prasad | TDP | TDP |
| 170 | Nagari | Chittoor | Gali Bhanu Prakash | TDP | TDP |
| 171 | Gangadhara Nellore(SC) | Chittoor | V. M. Thomas | TDP | TDP |
| 172 | Chittooru | Chittoor | Gurajala Jagan Mohan | TDP | TDP |
| 173 | Puthalapattu(SC) | Chittoor | Kalikiri Murali Mohan | TDP | TDP |
| 174 | Palamaneru | Chittoor | N. Amarnath Reddy | TDP | TDP |
| 175 | Kuppam | Chittoor | N. Chandrababu Naidu | TDP | TDP |

== Members of Parliament ==
| Year | Member | Party |
|---|---|---|
| 1952 (Note: 86 constituencies elected two members, one from the general category and one from Scheduled Castes or Scheduled Tribes. There was one constituency with three elected representatives. The multi-seat constituencies were created as reserved seats for backward sections of society, and were abolished in the 1960s.) | M. V. Gangadhara Siva | Indian National Congress |
| 1952 | T. N. Viswanatha Reddy | Indian National Congress |
| 1957 | M. V. Gangadhara Siva | Indian National Congress |
| 1957 | Madabhushi Ananthasayanam Ayyangar | Indian National Congress |
| 1962 | Madabhushi Ananthasayanam Ayyangar | Indian National Congress |
| 1967 | N. P. Chengalraya Naidu | Indian National Congress |
| 1971 | P. Narasimha Reddy | Indian National Congress |
| 1977 | Paturi Rajagopala Naidu | Indian National Congress |
| 1980 | Paturi Rajagopala Naidu | Indian National Congress |
| 1984 | N. P. Jhansi Lakshmi | Telugu Desam Party |
| 1989 | M. Gnanendra Reddy | Indian National Congress |
| 1991 | M. Gnanendra Reddy | Indian National Congress |
| 1996 | Nuthanakalva Ramakrishna Reddy | Telugu Desam Party |
| 1998 | Nuthanakalva Ramakrishna Reddy | Telugu Desam Party |
| 1999 | Nuthanakalva Ramakrishna Reddy | Telugu Desam Party |
| 2004 | D. K. Adikesavulu Naidu | Telugu Desam Party |
| 2009 | Naramalli Sivaprasad | Telugu Desam Party |
| 2014 | Naramalli Sivaprasad | Telugu Desam Party |
| 2019 | N. Reddeppa | YSR Congress Party |
| 2024 | Daggumalla Prasada Rao | Telugu Desam Party |

== Election results ==
Vote share of Winning candidates
| 2024 | 54.84% |
| 2019 | 52.04% |
| 2014 | 49.62% |
| 2009 | 41.59% |
| 2004 | 51.84% |
| 1999 | 50.18% |
| 1998 | 45.13% |
| 1996 | 50.80% |
| 1991 | 56.02% |
| 1989 | 54.83% |
| 1984 | 54.54% |
| 1980 | 51.55% |
| 1977 | 49.98% |
| 1971 | 67.81% |
| 1967 | 54.00% |
| 1962 | 45.27% |
| 1957 | 63.40% |
| 1952 (Note: Note: In the 1952 elections, Chittoor was a multi-seat constituency. The top winning candidate from the INC secured 20.49% of the votes, while the second INC candidate secured 19.16%) | 20.49% |

=== 1952 ===
1951 Indian general election: Chittoor
| Party | Candidate | Votes | % | ±% |
|---|---|---|---|---|
| INC | T. N. Viswanatha Reddy | 151,082 | 20.49 | |
| INC | M. V. Gangadhara Siva | 161,590 | 19.16 | |
| KLP | K.Nanjappa | 119,412 | 15.14 | |
| KLP | C.L.Narasimha Reddy | 99,400 | 12.60 | |
| Independent | R.Narasimha Reddy | 95,097 | 12.06 | |
| Socialist | T.Sankara Reddy | 63,420 | 8.04 | |
| Independent | D.Kadar Khan | 58,351 | 7.40 | |
| SCF | Rajamohan Vithal | 40,342 | 5.12 | |
| Majority | | | | |
| Turnout | | 788,694 | 54.97 | |
| INC gain from | | Swing | | |

=== 1957 ===
1957 Indian general election: Chittoor
| Party | Candidate | Votes | % | ±% |
|---|---|---|---|---|
| INC | Madabhushi Ananthasayanam Ayyangar | 154,817 | 63.40 | |
| Independent | C.V.L.Narayan | 71,357 | 29.22 | |
| Independent | K.Govindaswami | 11,618 | 4.76 | |
| Independent | Kakarla Venkataramanappa | 6,418 | 2.63 | |
| Majority | | | | |
| Turnout | | 244,210 | 27.94 | ▼27.03 |
| INC hold | | Swing | | |

=== 1962 ===
1962 Indian general election: Chittoor
| Party | Candidate | Votes | % | ±% |
|---|---|---|---|---|
| INC | Madabhushi Ananthasayanam Ayyangar | 130,026 | 45.27 | |
| SWA | C.V.L.Narayan | 106,062 | 36.93 | |
| Independent | K.Siddiah Naidu | 51,126 | 17.80 | |
| Majority | | 23,964 | 8.34 | |
| Turnout | | 287,214 | 67.65 | ▲39.71 |
| INC hold | | Swing | | |

=== 1967 ===
1967 Indian general election: Chittoor
| Party | Candidate | Votes | % | ±% |
|---|---|---|---|---|
| INC | N. P. Chengalraya Naidu | 186,594 | 54.00 | ▲8.73 |
| SWA | Acharya N G Ranga | 158,931 | 46.00 | ▲9.07 |
| Majority | | 27,663 | 8.00 | |
| Turnout | | 345,525 | 68.54 | ▲0.89 |
| INC hold | | Swing | | |

=== 1971 ===
1971 Indian general election: Chittoor
| Party | Candidate | Votes | % | ±% |
|---|---|---|---|---|
| INC | P. Narasimha Reddy | 245,052 | 67.81 | ▲13.81 |
| INC(O) | N. P. Chengalraya Naidu | 116,313 | 32.19 | |
| Majority | | 128,739 | 35.63 | |
| Turnout | | 361,365 | 69.07 | ▲0.53 |
| INC hold | | Swing | | |

=== 1977 ===
1977 Indian general election: Chittoor
| Party | Candidate | Votes | % | ±% |
|---|---|---|---|---|
| INC | Paturi Rajagopala Naidu | 229,252 | 49.98 | ▼17.83 |
| BLD | N.P.Chengalaraya Naidu | 218,805 | 47.70 | |
| Majority | | 10,447 | 2.28 | |
| Turnout | | 458,705 | 67.56 | ▼1.51 |
| INC hold | | Swing | | |

=== 1980 ===
1980 Indian general election: Chittoor
| Party | Candidate | Votes | % | ±% |
|---|---|---|---|---|
| INC(I) | Paturi Rajagopala Naidu | 232,249 | 51.55 | |
| JP | N.P.Chengalaraya Naidu | 172,402 | 38.27 | |
| JP(S) | Peddireddy Thimmareddy | 45,857 | 10.18 | |
| Majority | | 59,847 | 13.28 | |
| Turnout | | 450,508 | 62.44 | ▼5.12 |
| INC(I) gain from INC | | Swing | | |

=== 1984 ===
1984 Indian general election: Chittoor
| Party | Candidate | Votes | % | ±% |
|---|---|---|---|---|
| TDP | N. P. Jhansi Lakshmi | 332,543 | 54.54 | new |
| INC | Nallari Amarnath Reddy | 271,332 | 44.50 | |
| Majority | | 61,211 | 10.04 | |
| Turnout | | 609,686 | 76.31 | ▲13.87 |
| TDP gain from INC(I) | | Swing | | |

=== 1989 ===
1989 Indian general election: Chittoor
| Party | Candidate | Votes | % | ±% |
|---|---|---|---|---|
| INC | M. Gnanendra Reddy | 390,786 | 54.83 | ▲10.33 |
| TDP | N.Rangaswami Naidu | 308,278 | 43.25 | ▼11.29 |
| Majority | | 82,508 | 11.58 | |
| Turnout | | 712,718 | 73.93 | ▼2.38 |
| INC gain from TDP | | Swing | | |

=== 1991 ===
1991 Indian general election: Chittoor
| Party | Candidate | Votes | % | ±% |
|---|---|---|---|---|
| INC | M. Gnanendra Reddy | 373,631 | 56.02 | ▲1.19 |
| TDP | G.V.Sreenatha Reddy | 263,649 | 39.53 | ▼3.72 |
| BJP | N. P. Jhansi Lakshmi | 20,864 | 3.13 | |
| Majority | | 109,982 | 16.49 | |
| Turnout | | 667,018 | 68.05 | ▼5.88 |
| INC hold | | Swing | | |

=== 1996 ===
1996 Indian general election: Chittoor
| Party | Candidate | Votes | % | ±% |
|---|---|---|---|---|
| TDP | Nuthanakalva Ramakrishna Reddy | 405,052 | 50.80 | ▲11.27 |
| INC | D. K. Adikesavulu Naidu | 343,702 | 43.10 | ▼12.92 |
| NTRTDP(LP) | Gali Muddukrishnama Naidu | 24,240 | 3.04 | |
| Majority | | 61,350 | 7.69 | |
| Turnout | | 797,386 | 71.60 | ▲3.55 |
| TDP gain from INC | | Swing | | |

=== 1998 ===
1998 Indian general election: Chittoor
| Party | Candidate | Votes | % | ±% |
|---|---|---|---|---|
| TDP | Nuthanakalva Ramakrishna Reddy | 349,831 | 45.13 | ▼5.67 |
| INC | M. Gnanendra Reddy | 269,750 | 34.80 | ▼8.30 |
| BJP | N.P.Venkateswara Chowdary | 147,861 | 19.08 | |
| Majority | | 80,081 | 10.33 | |
| Turnout | | 775,143 | 69.94 | ▼1.66 |
| TDP hold | | Swing | | |

=== 1999 ===
1999 Indian general election: Chittoor
| Party | Candidate | Votes | % | ±% |
|---|---|---|---|---|
| TDP | Nuthanakalva Ramakrishna Reddy | 419,208 | 50.18 | ▲5.05 |
| INC | R.Gopinath | 400,570 | 47.95 | ▲13.15 |
| Majority | | 18,638 | 2.23 | |
| Turnout | | 835,406 | 74.88 | ▲4.94 |
| TDP hold | | Swing | | |

=== 2004 ===
2004 Indian general election: Chittoor
| Party | Candidate | Votes | % | ±% |
|---|---|---|---|---|
| TDP | D. K. Adikesavulu Naidu | 454,128 | 51.84 | ▲1.66 |
| INC | DR.Ravuri Venkata Swamy | 391,990 | 44.74 | ▼3.21 |
| Majority | | 62,138 | 7.09 | |
| Turnout | | 875,992 | 74.90 | ▲0.02 |
| TDP hold | | Swing | | |

=== 2009 ===
2009 Indian general election: Chittoor
| Party | Candidate | Votes | % | ±% |
|---|---|---|---|---|
| TDP | Naramalli Sivaprasad | 434,376 | 41.59 | ▼10.25 |
| INC | Thippeswamy M | 423,717 | 40.57 | ▼4.17 |
| PRP | Talari Manohar | 143,898 | 13.77 | new |
| Majority | | 10,813 | 1.03 | |
| Turnout | | 10,44,438 | 80.84 | ▲5.94 |
| TDP hold | | Swing | | |

=== 2014 ===
2014 Indian general election: Chittoor
| Party | Candidate | Votes | % | ±% |
|---|---|---|---|---|
| TDP | Naramalli Sivaprasad | 594,862 | 49.62 | ▲8.03 |
| YSRCP | G. Samanyakiran | 550,724 | 45.94 | |
| INC | B. Rajagopal | 16,572 | 1.38 | |
| BSP | Jithendra Kumar .Dhandu | 15,897 | 1.33 | |
| NOTA | None of the Above | 6,996 | 0.58 | |
| Majority | | 44,138 | 3.68 | |
| Turnout | | 11,98,915 | 82.59 | ▲1.75 |
| TDP hold | | Swing | | |

=== 2019 ===
2019 Indian general election: Chittoor
| Party | Candidate | Votes | % | ±% |
|---|---|---|---|---|
| YSRCP | N. Reddeppa | 686,792 | 52.04 | ▲6.11 |
| TDP | Naramalli Sivaprasad | 549,521 | 41.64 | ▼7.97 |
| INC | Cheemala Rangappa | 24,643 | 1.87 | ▲1.49 |
| NOTA | None of the above | 20,556 | 1.56 | ▲0.98 |
| Majority | | 137,271 | 10.40 | |
| Turnout | | 13,19,472 | 84.23 | |
| Registered electors | | 15,66,499 | | |
| YSRCP gain from TDP | | Swing | | |

=== 2024 ===
2024 Indian general elections: Chittoor
| Party | Candidate | Votes | % | ±% |
|---|---|---|---|---|
| TDP | Daggumalla Prasada Rao | 778,071 | 54.84 | ▲13.20 |
| YSRCP | N. Reddeppa | 5,57,592 | 39.30 | ▼12.74 |
| INC | Motukur Jagapathi | 30,150 | 2.12 | ▲0.25 |
| NOTA | None of the Above | 11,976 | 0.84 | ▼0.72 |
| Majority | | 2,20,479 | 15.54 | ▲5.14 |
| Turnout | | 14,25,910 | 86.76 | ▲2.52 |
| TDP gain from YSRCP | | Swing | | |

== See also ==
- Chittoor district
- List of constituencies of the Lok Sabha
