= M. Venkataramana (politician) =

Indian politician (1949 – 2014)

Mannuru Venkataramana (1949 – 15 December 2014) was an Indian politician from Andhra Pradesh. He was a former two-time member of the Andhra Pradesh Legislative Assembly.

== Early life ==
Venkataramana was from Tirupati, in the then Chittoor district, Andhra Pradesh. He passed Class 10 and he was a businessman. His wife Mannuru Suguna, was elected in the bye election caused by his death in February 2015.

== Career ==
Venkataramana was first elected as an MLA winning the 2004 Andhra Pradesh Legislative Assembly election from Tirupati Assembly constituency representing the Indian National Congress. In 2004, he polled 91,863 votes and defeated his nearest rival, N. V. Prasad of the Telugu Desam Party, by a margin of 39,095 votes. In the 2012 bye election, he lost to Bhumana Karunakar Reddy of the YSR Congress Party, by a 17,975 votes. He shifted to the Telugu Desam Party and won the 2014 Andhra Pradesh Legislative Assembly election, where he polled 99,313 votes and defeated Karunakar Reddy of YSRCP, by a margin of 41,539 votes.

Venkataramana died on 15 December 2014 in Chennai due to kidney related ailments a week after his bypass surgery.
