= Arani Srinivasulu =

Indian politician (born 1954)

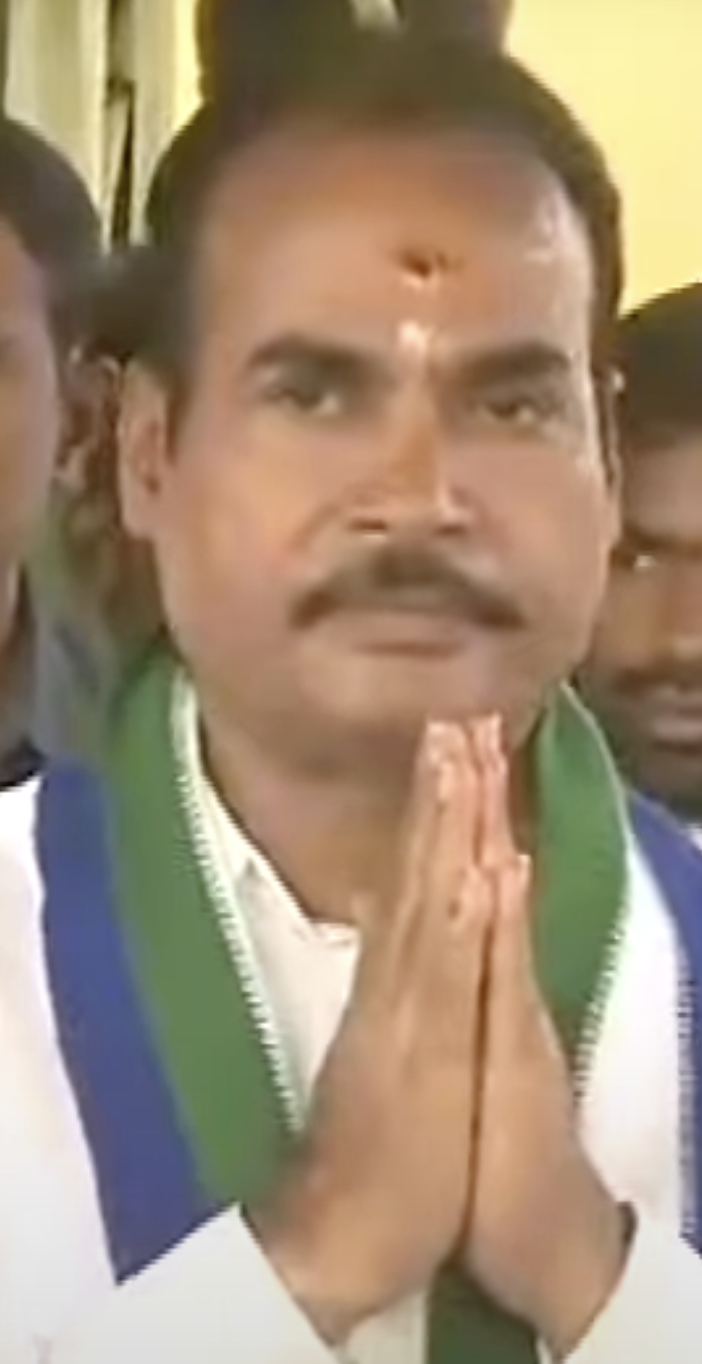

Member of the Andhra Pradesh Legislative Assembly
- Incumbent
- Assumed office 2024
- Preceded by: Bhumana Karunakar Reddy
- Constituency: Tirupati
- In office 2019–2024
- Preceded by: D. K. Satya Prabha
- Succeeded by: Gurajala Jagan Mohan
- Constituency: Chittoor

Personal details
- Born: 15 May 1954 (age 72)
- Party: Janasena Party (since 2024)
- Other political affiliations: YSR Congress Party (until 2024); Praja Rajyam Party; Telugu Desam Party

Arani Srinivasulu (born 15 May 1954), also known as Jangalapalli Srinivasulu and JMC, is a politician from the Indian state of Andhra Pradesh. He was elected as the Member of the Legislative Assembly (MLA) from Tirupati Assembly constituency in 2024 on behalf of the Janasena Party (JSP).

== Early life and education ==
Arani Srinivasulu was born to Arani Krishnaiah in Kongareddypalli. He did his graduation in Arts from PVKN Government Degree College, S. V. University, Tirupati.

== Political career ==
Srinivasulu contested the 2009 Andhra Pradesh Legislative Assembly election from Chittoor constituency on behalf of Praja Rajyam Party (PRP) and lost the election to C. K. Babu of Indian National Congress (Congress) by just 1,710 votes and 1.3%. Later he left PRP and joined TDP and had been appointed the president of its Chittoor district unit. In April 2014, he left TDP and joined YSRCP. He contested to Chittoor constituency in the 2014 Andhra Pradesh Legislative Assembly election on behalf of YSRCP but lost to TDP's D. K. Satya Prabha. He again contested in the 2019 Andhra Pradesh Legislative Assembly election and won as the MLA.

Srinivasulu was unhappy with the YSRCP leadership ever since party has appointed Vijayanand Reddy as the Chittoor constituency in-charge for upcoming 2024 general elections to AP Assembly. After that he met Jana Sena party chief Pawan Kalyan on 3 March 2024 in Hyderabad and later YSR Congress Party suspended him from Party.

Arani Srinivasulu has joined Jana Sena Party in the presence of party president Pawan Kalyan on 7 March 2024.
