= Polavaram, Chittoor =

Polavaram
- Village
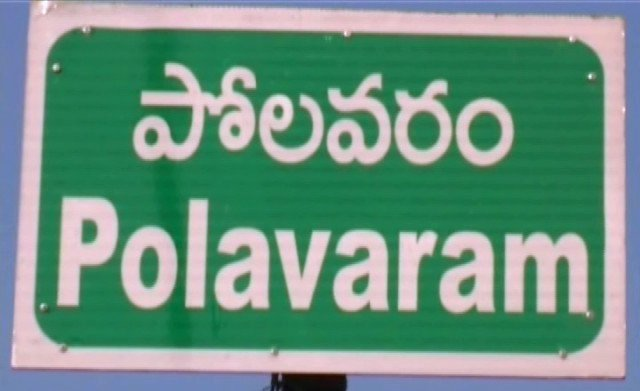
- Interactive map of Polavaram
- Location in Andhra Pradesh, India
- Coordinates: 13.3704894°N 79.1381225°E
- State: Andhra Pradesh
- District: Chittoor
- Mandal: Puthalapattu
- Gram panchayat: Polavaram
- Seat: Panchayth Office

Government
  - Type: Panchayati raj
  - Body: Polavaram Gram panchayat
  - Sarpanch: Nirmala Sirasanambati
  - Upa-Sarpanch: Dasaradharami Reddy S

Languages
  - Official: Telugu
- Time zone: UTC+5:30
- PIN: 517124
- Vehicle registration: AP 03

Polavaram is a village in Puthalapattu Mandal, Chittoor district of Andhra Pradesh state.

== Politics and government ==
Polavaram gram panchayat is the local self-government of the village. It is divided into wards and each ward is represented by a ward member.

As per the recent panchayat election results Smt. Nirmala Sirasanambati is the current sarpanch of the panchayat and Dasaradharami Reddy S is the upa-sarpanch of the panchayat.

== Agriculture ==
The major crops in this village are Paddy, Sugarcane, Groundnuts, Mango etc., Majority of the land is utilized for agriculture in this village.

== Education ==
As per the school information report for the academic year 2020–21, the village has one Mandal Parishad school and one Zilla Parishad school.

- MPP School, Polavaram
- ZP High School, Polavaram

== Banks ==
Union Bank of India (earlier Andhra Bank) has a branch in this village with branch code 809161 and IFSC as UBIN0809161.

== Festivals ==
People in this village celebrate the below festivals.

1. Makara Sankranthi (aka Pongal) - 3/4 Days
2. Ugadi - 1 Day
3. Sri Rama Navami - 1/2 Days
4. Varalakshmi Vratham - 1 Day
5. Vinayaka Chavithi (aka Ganesh Chaturthi) - 3 Days
6. Vijaya Dasami (aka Dussehra) - 1 Day
7. Deepavali (aka Diwali) - 2 Days
8. Karthika Pournami - 1 Day

== See also ==
- Kanipakam
