= T. N. Viswanatha Reddy =

Indian politician

Member of Parliament, Lok Sabha
- In office 1957 - 1962
- Preceded by: Constituency Established
- Succeeded by: C. L. Narasimha Reddy
- Constituency: Rajampet
- In office 1952 - 1957
- Preceded by: M. V. Gangadhara Siva
- Succeeded by: M. V. Gangadhara Siva
- Constituency: Chittoor

Personal details
- Born: 1 July 1919 Madanapalli, Chittoor district, Madras Presidency, British India
- Died: 31 July 1989 (aged 70)
- Party: Indian National Congress
- Spouse: Pushpavenamma
- Children: 3; 1 son and 2 daughters
- Website: 164.100.47.132/LssNew/biodata_1_12/975.htm

T. N. Viswanatha Reddy (1919–1989) was an Indian politician and Member of parliament, Lok Sabha.

TN Viswanatha Reddy is a Member of Parliament of India. He hails from Tamballapalle of Annamayya district and was elected as the first unanimous MP among the Telugu people. In 1957, he filed his nomination as a Congress candidate from Rajampet, but no other party filed nomination at that time. He was elected unanimously.

In 1952, as a member of the Indian National Congress, he was elected to the first Lok Sabha with the support of MV Gangadhara Shiva, who was then a member of the Indian Parliament from the Chittoor Lok Sabha constituency. Then in 1957, he was elected to the second Lok Sabha from Rajampet Lok Sabha constituency with CL Narasimha Reddy. At that time he earned special respect among the people due to undertaking many social and public welfare activities.

However, TN Viswanatha Reddy was born on 1 July 1919 in Madanapally. He studied at Loyola College, Madras and Madras Christian College. He married Pushpavenamma in the year 1944. They have one son and two daughters.
