= D. A. Sathya Prabha =

Indian politician (1950–2020)

D. A. Sathya Prabha (1950 – 2020) was an Indian politician from Andhra Pradesh. She was a former member of the Andhra Pradesh Legislative Assembly representing Telugu Desam Party from Chittoor Assembly constituency.

Prabha was born in Sadum village in Chittoor district. She married industrialist D. K. Adikesavulu Naidu, who served as an MP of Chittoor and two times as Tirupati Thirumala Devasthanam Trust Board chairman.

Prabha entered politics after the death of her husband and contested the seat which fell vacant due to his death. She won the 2014 Andhra Pradesh Legislative Assembly election representing the Telugu Desam Party from Chittoor Assembly constituency. In 2019, she was nominated for the Lok Sabha election by TDP. She contested from Rajampet Lok Sabha constituency but lost to P. V. Midhun Reddy.

She died of COVID-19 on 20 November 2020 after a prolonged illness at Vaidehi Institute of Medical Sciences in Bengaluru. She is survived by a son and two daughters.
