= Chadalavada =

Chadalavada (Telugu: చదలవాడ) is a Telugu surname. Notable people with the surname include:

- Chadalawada Krishnamurthy, member of Andhra Pradesh Legislative Assembly
- Chadalavada (actor) (died 1968), comedian in Telugu films
