= K. Eranna =

Indian politician

K. Eranna (born 1959) is an Indian politician from Andhra Pradesh. He was a former member of the Andhra Pradesh Legislative Assembly from Madakasira Assembly constituency, which is reserved for the Scheduled Caste community, in Anantapur district, representing the Telugu Desam Party.

== Early life ==
Eranna is from Madakasira, Anantapur district, Andhra Pradesh. He is the son of the late K. Mallapa. He did his schooling at ZPH School, Amarapuram and passed the Secondary School Certificate examinations, which are equivalent to Class 10, in October 1979. Later, he studied Intermediate at Government Junior College, Anantapur, in 1982 - 83, but could not complete the course. He declared assets worth Rs.53 lakhs in his affidavit to the Election Commission of India.

== Career ==
Eranna won the Madakasira Assembly constituency in the 2014 Andhra Pradesh Legislative Assembly election representing the Telugu Desam Party. He polled 76,741 votes and defeated his nearest rival, M. Thippeswamy of the YSR Congress Party, by a margin of 14,712 votes. In 2018, his election was annulled by the Hyderabad High Court and upheld by the Supreme Court and later his rival Thippeswamy was sworn in as MLA of Madakasira constituency. He first contested on the TDP ticket in the 2009 Andhra Pradesh Legislative Assembly election but lost to K. Sudhakar of the Indian National Congress, by a margin of 10,415 votes. He also lost the 2019 election, Thippeswamy by a margin of 13,136 votes.
