= N. Reddeppa =

Indian politician

Nallakonda Gari Reddeppa

Member of Parliament, Lok Sabha
- In office 2019–2024
- Preceded by: Naramalli Sivaprasad
- Succeeded by: Daggumalla Prasada Rao
- Constituency: Chittoor, Andhra Pradesh

Personal details
- Born: 1 October 1951 (age 74) Valligatla, Chittoor District, Madras State (now Andhra Pradesh)
- Party: YSR Congress Party
- Spouse: N. Reddemma

Nallakonda Gari Reddeppa is an Indian politician. He was elected to the Lok Sabha, lower house of the Parliament of India from Chittoor, Andhra Pradesh in the 2019 Indian general election as a member of the YSR Congress Party.
