= Nuthanakalva Ramakrishna Reddy =

Indian politician (1936–2010)

Member of Parliament, Lok Sabha
- In office 1996–2004
- Preceded by: M. Gnanendra Reddy
- Succeeded by: D. K. Adikesavulu Naidu
- Constituency: Chittoor

Member of Legislative Assembly Andhra Pradesh
- In office 1985–1996
- Preceded by: M. Gnanendra Reddy
- Succeeded by: D. K. Adikesavulu Naidu
- Constituency: Punganur

Personal details
- Born: 14 January 1936 Kelavathi village, Chittoor, Andhra Pradesh
- Died: August 14, 2010 (aged 74) Hyderabad, Andhra Pradesh,(now Telangana)
- Party: Telugu Desam Party
- Spouse: N. Thayaramma
- Children: 2 sons, 1 daughter N. Amarnath Reddy; N.Sreenatha Reddy

Nuthanakalva Ramakrishna Reddy (14 January 1936 – 14 August 2010) was a leader of Telugu Desam Party from Andhra Pradesh.

== Early life ==
Ramakrishna Reddy was born in Kelavathi village of Chittoor district, Andhra Pradesh.

== Political career ==
Reddy served as member of the Lok Sabha representing Chittoor (Lok Sabha constituency), MLA from Punganur (Assembly constituency). He was elected to 11th, 12th and 13th Lok Sabha. He served as MLA & State Minister from Punganur (Assembly constituency) in 1985, 1989 & 1994 Assembly elections. In 1996 he resigned as MLA and contested as Lok Sabha Member for Chittoor (Lok Sabha constituency) for 11th Lok Sabha elections.

== Death ==
He died after a prolonged illness at the age of 74, on 14 August 2010.
