= Madakasira Assembly constituency =

Constituency of the Andhra Pradesh Legislative Assembly, India

Coordinates: 13.94°N 77.27°E

Madakasira
- Constituency No. 156 for the Andhra Pradesh Legislative Assembly
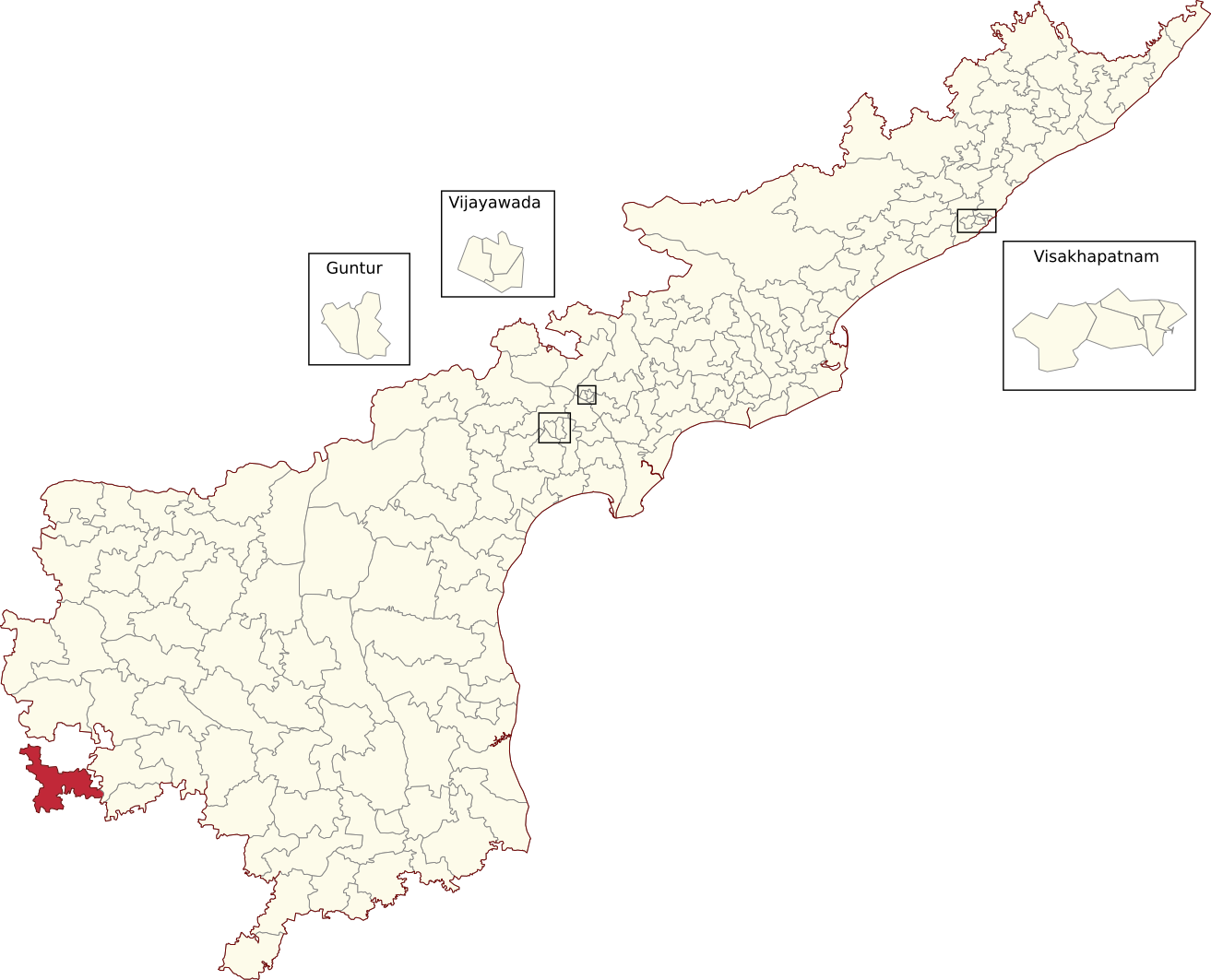
- Location of Madakasira Assembly constituency within Andhra Pradesh

Constituency details
- Country: India
- Region: South India
- State: Andhra Pradesh
- District: Sri Sathya Sai
- Lok Sabha constituency: Hindupur
- Established: 1951
- Total electors: 201,824
- Reservation: SC

Member of Legislative Assembly
- 16th Andhra Pradesh Legislative Assembly
- Incumbent MS Raju
- Party: TDP
- Alliance: NDA
- Elected year: 2024

Madakasira is a Scheduled Caste reserved constituency in Sri Sathya Sai district in Andhra Pradesh that elects representatives to the Andhra Pradesh Legislative Assembly in India. It is one of the seven assembly segments of Hindupur Lok Sabha constituency.

M. S. Raju is the current MLA of the constituency, having won the 2019 Andhra Pradesh Legislative Assembly election from YSR Congress Party. As of 2019, there are a total of 201,824 electors in the constituency. The constituency was established in 1951, as per the Delimitation Orders (1951).

== Mandals ==
Mandal
Madakasira
Amarapuram
Gudibanda
Rolla
Agali

== Members of the Legislative Assembly ==
Year	Member	Political party
1952	Siddanna Gowd	Independent
1962	B. Rukmani Devi	Indian National Congress
1967	M. B. R. Rao	Swatantra Party
1972	M. Yellappa	Indian National Congress
1978	Y. Thimma Reddy	Indian National Congress
1983	Y. C. Thimma Reddy	Independent politician
1985	H. B. Narase Gowd	Telugu Desam Party
1989	Raghu Veera Reddy	Indian National Congress
1994	Y. T. Prabhakara Reddy	Telugu Desam Party
1999	Raghu Veera Reddy	Indian National Congress
2004	Raghu Veera Reddy	Indian National Congress
2009	K. Sudhakar	Indian National Congress
2014	K. Eranna	Telugu Desam Party
2019	M. Thippeswamy	YSR Congress Party
2024	M. S. Raju	Telugu Desam Party

== Election results ==
=== 1952 ===
1952 Madras Legislative Assembly election: Madakasira
Party	Candidate	Votes	%	±%
Independent	Siddanna Gowd	23,214	51.31	
INC	Venkatasivamma	8,345	18.44	18.44
Independent	Voolappa	5,437	12.02	
ABHM	Narayana Rao	5,374	11.88	
KMPP	Nurugendra Gowd	2,875	6.35	
Margin of victory		14,869	32.86	
Turnout		45,245	62.44	
Registered electors		72,464		
Independent win (new seat)				

=== 2004 ===
2004 Andhra Pradesh Legislative Assembly election: Madakasira
Party	Candidate	Votes	%	±%
INC	Raghu Veera Reddy	74,100	54.66	−6.54
TDP	Y. T. Prabhakar Reddy	58,764	43.34	+4.82
Majority		15,336	11.32	
Turnout		135,577	83.27	+3.34
INC hold		Swing		

=== 2009 ===
2009 Andhra Pradesh Legislative Assembly election: Madakasira
Party	Candidate	Votes	%	±%
INC	K. Sudhakar	70,657	47.78	−6.88
TDP	K. Eranna	60,242	40.74	−2.70
PRP	S. Hanumanthappa	9,414	6.37	
Majority		10,415	7.04	
Turnout		147,887	84.48	+1.21
INC hold		Swing		

=== 2014 ===
2014 Andhra Pradesh Legislative Assembly election: Madakasira
Party	Candidate	Votes	%	±%
TDP	K. Eranna	76,741	48.53	
YSRCP	M. Thippeswamy	62,092	39.22	
Majority		14,649	7.04	
Turnout		1,58,147	84.00	
TDP gain from INC		Swing		

=== 2019 ===
2019 Andhra Pradesh Legislative Assembly election: Madakasira
Party	Candidate	Votes	%	±%
YSRCP	M. Thippeswamy	88,527	49.99	
TDP	K. Eranna	75,391	42.57	
Majority		13,136	7.36	
Turnout		1,78,534	88.46	
YSRCP gain from TDP		Swing		

=== 2024 ===
2024 Andhra Pradesh Legislative Assembly election: Madakasira
Party	Candidate	Votes	%	±%
TDP	M. S. Raju	79,983	42.92	
YSRCP	Erra Lakkappa	79,632	42.78	
INC	Karikera Sudhakar	17,380	9.34	
Majority		351	0.19	
Turnout		1,86,138		
TDP gain from YSRCP		Swing		

== See also ==
- List of constituencies of Andhra Pradesh Legislative Assembly
