= M. Thippeswamy =

Indian politician from Andhra Pradesh

Dr. M. Thippeswamy

Member of Andhra Pradesh Legislative Assembly
- In office 2018–2024
- Preceded by: K Eeranna
- Succeeded by: M. S. Raju
- Constituency: Madakasira
- In office 1999 - 2004
- Constituency: Palamaner

Personal details
- Born: Mopuragundu Thippeswamy
- Political party: YSR Congress Party
- Spouse: Smt. Sarayu Satyavani
- Children: Swamy Dinesh; Swamy Mahesh; Swamy Rajesh
- Parent: M. Hanumappa (father)
- Education: M.B.B.S., M.D.
- Alma mater: Sri Venkateswara University
- Occupation: Politician; Doctor

Dr. Mopuragundu Thippeswamy is an Indian politician from Andhra Pradesh. Presently, he is a member of YSR Congress Party. Previously, he was member of Indian National Congress Party. He was an elected Member of Andhra Pradesh Legislative Assembly from Madakasira and Palamaner Constituencies. He contested the Chittoor Loksabha Constituency during the year 2009 from Indian National Congress Party. Presently, by the new judgement of High court; Dr. M. Thippeswamy can continue as Member of Legislative Assembly for Madakasira as from 2018.

== Political career ==
He entered politics and contested to be Member of Legislative Assembly during the year 1994 from Palamaner and was elected to Andhra Pradesh State Legislative Assembly during 1999 elections.

Political Information
Year	Constituency	Party	Result
1994	Palamaner	INC	Lost
1999	Palamaner	INC	Won
2004	Chittoor	INC	Lost
2014	Madakasira	YSRCP	Won
2019	Madakasira	YSRCP	Won
