= Palamaner Assembly constituency =

Constituency of the Andhra Pradesh Legislative Assembly, India

Coordinates: 13.20°N 78.75°E

Palamaner
- Constituency No. 174 for the Andhra Pradesh Legislative Assembly
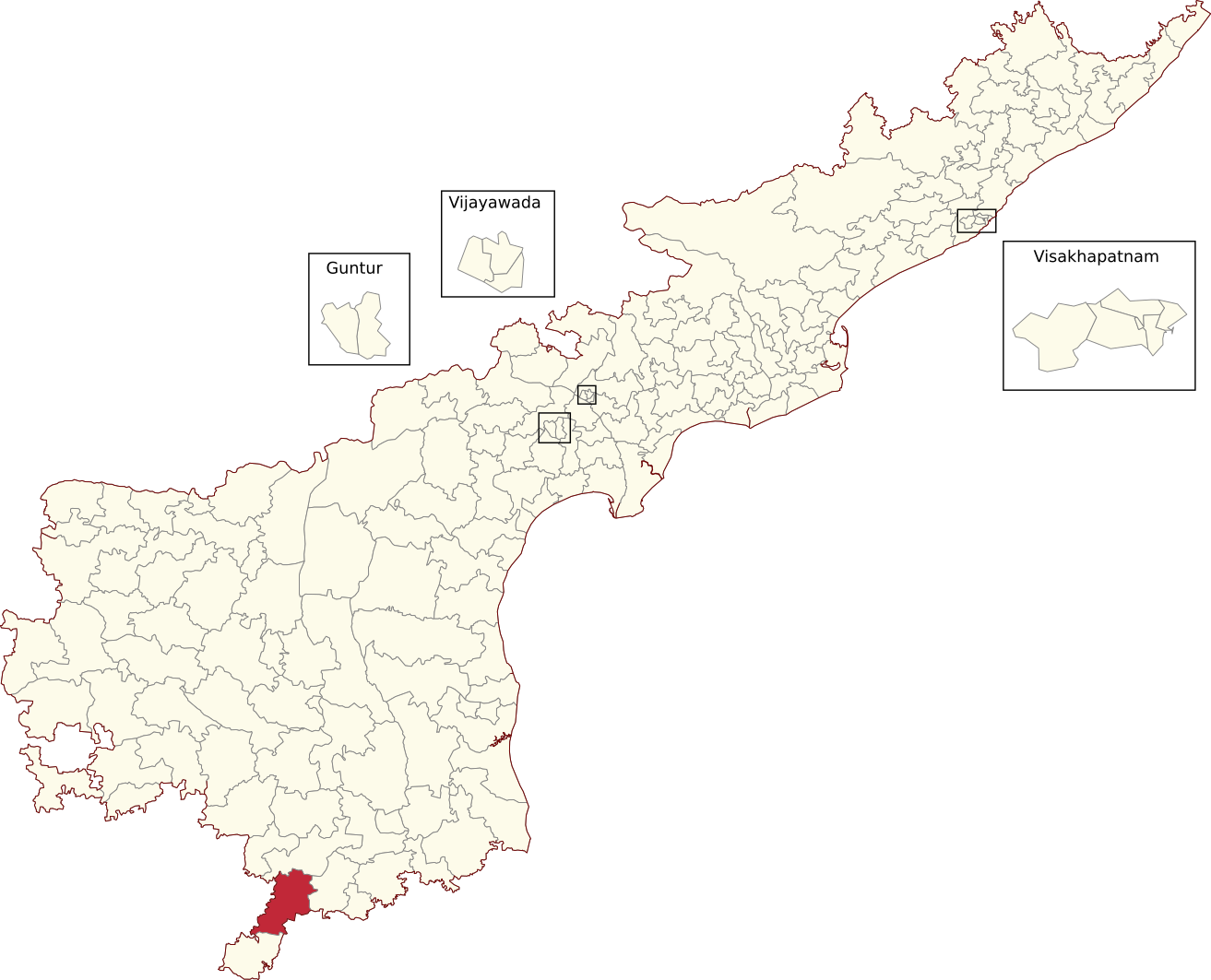
- Location of Palamaner Assembly constituency within Andhra Pradesh

Constituency details
- Country: India
- Region: South India
- State: Andhra Pradesh
- District: Chittoor
- Lok Sabha constituency: Chittoor
- Established: 1951
- Total electors: 255,870
- Reservation: None

Member of Legislative Assembly
- 16th Andhra Pradesh Legislative Assembly
- Incumbent N. Amarnath Reddy
- Party: TDP
- Alliance: NDA
- Elected year: 2024

Palamaner Assembly constituency is a constituency in Chittoor district of Andhra Pradesh that elects representatives to the Andhra Pradesh Legislative Assembly in India. It is one of the seven assembly segments of Chittoor Lok Sabha constituency.

N. Amarnath Reddy is the current MLA of the constituency, having won the 2024 Andhra Pradesh Legislative Assembly election from Telugu Desam Party. As of 2019, there are a total of 255,870 electors in the constituency. The constituency was established in 1951, as per the Delimitation Orders (1951).

== Mandals ==
Mandal
Palamaneru
Gangavaram
Baireddypalle
Peddapanjani
V. Kota

== Members of the Legislative Assembly ==
Year	Member	Political party
1952	Ramabrahaman	Indian National Congress
1962	Kusini Nanjappa	Indian National Congress
1967	T. C. Rajan	Swatantra Party
1972	M. M. Rathnam	Indian National Congress
1978	A. Ratnam	Indian National Congress
1983	Anjineyulu	Telugu Desam Party
1985	Patnam Subbaiah	Telugu Desam Party
1989	Patnam Subbaiah	Telugu Desam Party
1994	Patnam Subbaiah	Telugu Desam Party
1999	M. Thippeswamy	Indian National Congress
2004	L. Lalitha Kumari	Telugu Desam Party
2009	N. Amarnath Reddy	Telugu Desam Party
2014	N. Amarnath Reddy	YSR Congress Party
2019	N. Venkate Gowda	YSR Congress Party
2024	N. Amarnath Reddy	Telugu Desam Party

== Election results ==
=== 1952 ===
1952 Madras Legislative Assembly election: Palamaner
Party	Candidate	Votes	%	±%
INC	Ramabrahaman	13,780	41.46	41.46
KLP	Soma Ram Reddi	5,471	16.46	
CPI	A. P. Vajravolu Chetty	4,819	14.50	
Socialist Party (India)	L. Soundara Raja Lyenger	3,305	9.94	
Independent	P. Seethayya Naidu	2,505	7.54	
KMPP	A. R. Lakshmayya Naiudu	1,731	5.21	
Independent	Sampangi Ramayya	1,625	4.89	
Margin of victory		8,309	25.00	
Turnout		33,236	42.95	
Registered electors		77,386		
INC win (new seat)				

=== 2009 ===
2009 Andhra Pradesh Legislative Assembly election: Palamaner
Party	Candidate	Votes	%	±%
TDP	N. Amarnath Reddy	79,977	46.2	
INC	R. Reddeppa Reddy	64,429	37.2	
Majority		15,548	9	
Turnout		1,97,912	84.41	
TDP hold		Swing		

=== 2014 ===
2014 Andhra Pradesh Legislative Assembly election: Palamaner
Party	Candidate	Votes	%	±%
YSRCP	N. Amarnath Reddy	96,683	48.86	
TDP	R.V.Subash Chandra Bose	93,833	47.40	
Majority		2,850	1.46	
Turnout		1,97,912	84.41	
YSRCP gain from TDP		Swing		

=== 2019 ===
2019 Andhra Pradesh Legislative Assembly election: Palamaner
Party	Candidate	Votes	%	±%
YSRCP	N. Venkate Gowda	119,241	54.46	+5.60
TDP	N. Amarnath Reddy	86,995	40.02	−7.38
Majority		32,246	14.44	
Turnout		2,18,957	88.60	+4.19
YSRCP hold		Swing		

=== 2024 ===
2024 Andhra Pradesh Legislative Assembly election: Palamaner
Party	Candidate	Votes	%	±%
TDP	N. Amarnath Reddy	123,232	52.09	▲12.07
YSRCP	N. Venkate Gowda	1,03,110	43.59	▼10.87
INC	B Siva Sankar	4,015	1.70	N/A
NOTA	None Of The Above	2,344	0.99	N/A
Majority		20,122	8.51	▼5.93
Turnout		2,36,556		
TDP gain from YSRCP		Swing		

== See also ==
- Palamaner
- List of constituencies of Andhra Pradesh Vidhan Sabha
