= Tirupati Assembly constituency =

Constituency of the Andhra Pradesh Legislative Assembly, India

Coordinates: 13.63°N 79.42°E

Tirupati
- Constituency No. 167 for the Andhra Pradesh Legislative Assembly
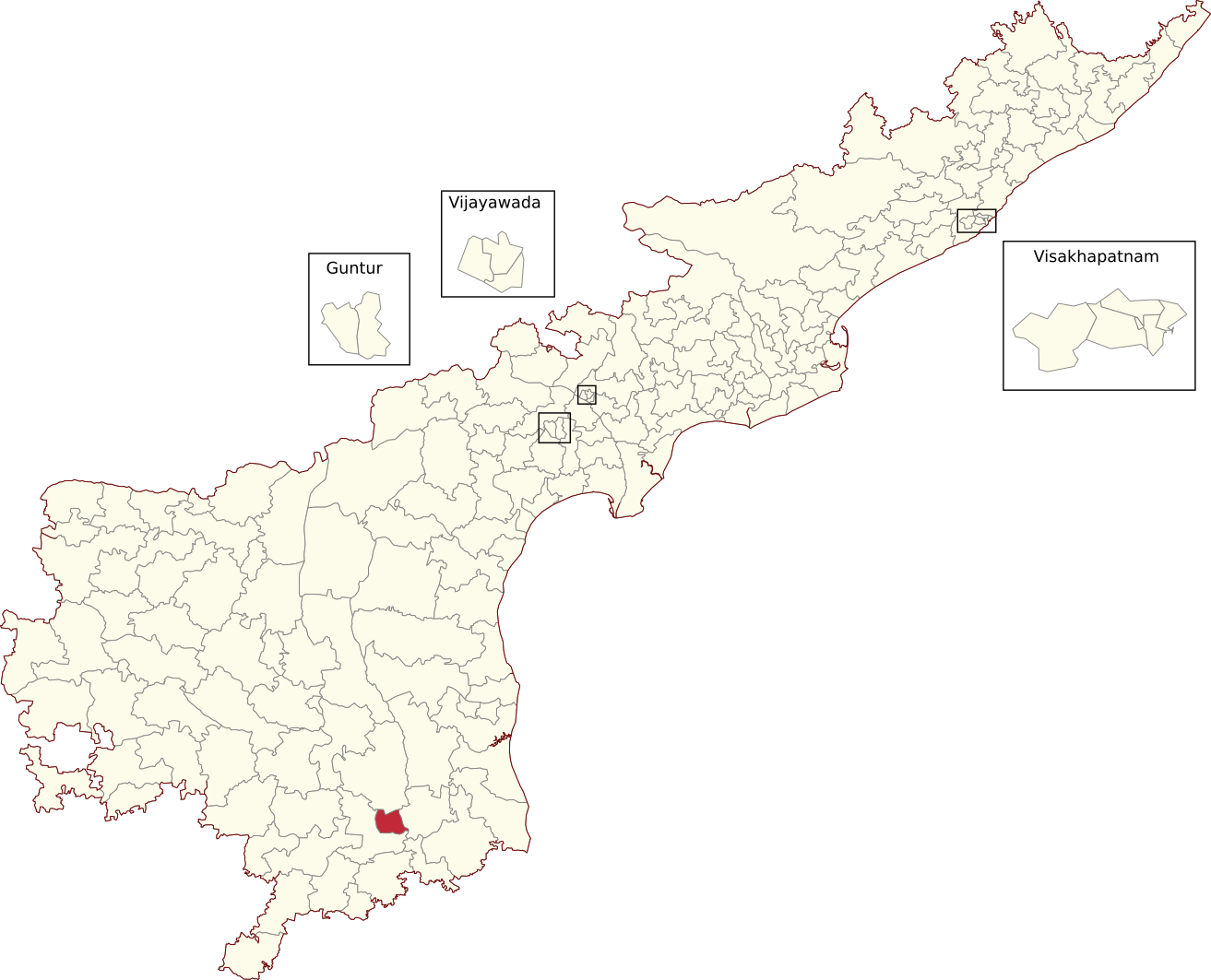
- Location of Tirupati Assembly constituency within Andhra Pradesh

Constituency details
- Country: India
- Region: South India
- State: Andhra Pradesh
- District: Tirupati
- Lok Sabha constituency: Tirupati
- Established: 1951
- Total electors: 270,762
- Reservation: None

Member of Legislative Assembly
- 16th Andhra Pradesh Legislative Assembly
- Incumbent Arani Srinivasulu
- Party: JSP
- Alliance: NDA
- Elected year: 2024

Tirupati Assembly constituency is a constituency in Tirupati district of Andhra Pradesh that elects representatives to the Andhra Pradesh Legislative Assembly in India. It is one of the seven assembly segments of Tirupati Lok Sabha constituency.

Arani Srinivasulu is the current MLA of the constituency, having won the 2024 Andhra Pradesh Legislative Assembly election from Janasena Party. As of 2019, there are a total of 270,762 electors in the constituency. The constituency was established in 1951, as per the Delimitation Orders (1951).

== Mandals ==
Tirupati Assembly constituency consists of two mandals.

Mandals
Tirupati Urban mandal
Tirupati Rural mandal

Mandals in Tirupati Assembly Constituency

== Members of the Legislative Assembly ==
| Year | Member | Political party |
|---|---|---|
| 1952 | Kidambi Varadachari | Indian National Congress |
| 1952 | M. Dorai Kannu | Indian National Congress |
| 1955 | Reddyvari Nathamuni Reddy | Indian National Congress |
| 1962 | Reddyvari Nathamuni Reddy | Indian National Congress |
| 1967 | Agarala Eswara Reddi | Swatantra Party |
| 1972 | Vijaya Sikhamani | Indian National Congress |
| 1978 | Agarala Eswara Reddi | Indian National Congress |
| 1983 | N. T. Rama Rao | Telugu Desam Party |
| 1983^ | Dr. Kathula Syamala | Telugu Desam Party |
| 1985 | Mabbu Rami Reddy | Indian National Congress |
| 1989 | Mabbu Rami Reddy | Indian National Congress |
| 1994 | Antharaji Mohan | Telugu Desam Party |
| 1999 | Chadalavada Krishna Murthy | Telugu Desam Party |
| 2004 | M. Venkataramana | Indian National Congress |
| 2009 | Konidala Chiranjeevi | Praja Rajyam Party |
| 2012^ | Bhumana Karunakar Reddy | YSR Congress Party |
| 2014 | M. Venkataramana | Telugu Desam Party |
| 2015^ | M. Suguna | Telugu Desam Party |
| 2019 | Bhumana Karunakar Reddy | YSR Congress Party |
| 2024 | Arani Srinivasulu | Janasena Party |

^ by-election

== Election results ==
=== 2004 ===
2004 Andhra Pradesh Legislative Assembly election: Tirupati
| Party | Candidate | Votes | % | ±% |
|---|---|---|---|---|
| INC | M. Venkataramana | 91,863 | 61.78 | +19.39 |
| TDP | N V Prasad | 52,768 | 35.49 | −16.42 |
| Majority | | 39,095 | 26.29 | |
| Turnout | | 148,685 | 50.94 | −2.50 |
| INC gain from TDP | | Swing | | |

=== 2009 ===
2009 Andhra Pradesh Legislative Assembly election: Tirupati
| Party | Candidate | Votes | % | ±% |
|---|---|---|---|---|
| PRP | Chiranjeevi | 56,309 | 44.12 | |
| INC | Bhumana Karunakar Reddy | 45,379 | 31.64 | |
| TDP | K Sankara Reddy | 21,307 | 16.69 | |
| Majority | | 10,930 | 12.48 | |
| Turnout | | 127,627 | 51.64 | +0.70 |
| PRP gain from INC | | Swing | | |

=== 2012 by-election ===
2012 Andhra Pradesh Legislative Assembly by-election: Tirupati
| Party | Candidate | Votes | % | ±% |
|---|---|---|---|---|
| YSRCP | Bhumana Karunakar Reddy | 59,195 | 45.21 | |
| INC | M. Venkataramana | 41,280 | 31.52 | |
| TDP | Chadalavada Krishnamurthy | 30,453 | 23.25 | |
| Majority | | 17,975 | 13.72 | |
| Turnout | | 130,928 | | |
| YSRCP gain from PRP | | Swing | | |

=== 2014 ===
2014 Andhra Pradesh Legislative Assembly election: Tirupati
| Party | Candidate | Votes | % | ±% |
|---|---|---|---|---|
| TDP | M. Venkataramana | 99,313 | 57.56 | |
| YSRCP | Bhumana Karunakar Reddy | 57,774 | 33.49 | |
| Majority | | 41,539 | 24.07 | |
| Turnout | | 172,525 | 59.51 | +7.87 |
| TDP gain from YSRCP | | Swing | | |

=== 2015 by-election ===
2015 Andhra Pradesh Legislative Assembly by-election: Tirupati
| Party | Candidate | Votes | % | ±% |
|---|---|---|---|---|
| TDP | M. Suguna | 126,162 | 85.69 | |
| INC | R Sreedevi | 9,628 | 6.65 | |
| Majority | | 116,524 | 79.15 | |
| Turnout | | 147,216 | 50.78 | −8.73 |
| TDP hold | | Swing | ▲28.13 | |

=== 2019 ===
2019 Andhra Pradesh Legislative Assembly election: Tirupati
| Party | Candidate | Votes | % | ±% |
|---|---|---|---|---|
| YSRCP | Bhumana Karunakar Reddy | 80,544 | 44.64 | |
| TDP | M. Suguna | 79,836 | 44.25 | |
| JSP | Chadalavada Krishnamurthy | 12,315 | 6.83 | |
| INC | Prameela Kidambi | 2,725 | 1.51 | |
| Majority | | 708 | 0.39 | |
| Turnout | | 1,80,429 | 66.62 | |
| YSRCP gain from TDP | | Swing | | |

=== 2024 ===
2024 Andhra Pradesh Legislative Assembly election: Tirupati
| Party | Candidate | Votes | % | ±% |
|---|---|---|---|---|
| JSP | Arani Srinivasulu | 124,107 | 64.06 | |
| YSRCP | Bhumana Abhinay Reddy | 62,151 | 32.08 | |
| NOTA | None of the above | 1,281 | 0.66 | |
| Majority | | 61,956 | 31.98 | |
| Turnout | | 1,93,742 | | |
| JSP gain from YSRCP | | Swing | | |

== See also ==
- List of constituencies of the Andhra Pradesh Legislative Assembly
