= N. Venkate Gowda =

Indian politician

N. Venkate Gowda (born 1988) is an Indian politician from Andhra Pradesh. He is an MLA of YSR Congress Party from Palamaner Assembly constituency in Chittoor district. He won the 2019 Andhra Pradesh Legislative Assembly election representing YSR Congress Party. He has been nominated again by YSRCP to contest the Palamaner seat for the 2024 Assembly election but he lost to N. Amarnath Reddy of the Telugu Desam Party.

== Early life and education ==
Gowda did his schooling till Class 9 from Zilla Parishad High School in Venkatagiri Kota. He runs his own business.

== Career ==
Gowda became an MLA for the first time winning the 2019 Andhra Pradesh Legislative Assembly election representing YSR Congress Party. He polled 119,241 votes and defeated his nearest rival, N. Amarnath Reddy of Telugu Desam Party, by a margin of 31,616 votes. However, he lost to Amarnath Reddy in the 2024 Andhra Pradesh Legislative Assembly election by a margin of 20,122 votes.
