= Agarala Eswara Reddi =

Indian politician (1933–2020)

Speaker of the Andhra Pradesh Legislative Assembly
- In office 7 September 1982 – 16 January 1983
- Preceded by: Kona Prabhakara Rao
- Succeeded by: Tangi Satyanarayana

Deputy Speaker of the Andhra Pradesh Legislative Assembly
- In office 27 March 1981 – 6 September 1982
- Preceded by: K. Prabhakara Reddy
- Succeeded by: Ireni Lingaiah

Andhra Pradesh Legislative Assembly
- In office 1967–1972
- Preceded by: Raddivari Nathamuni Reddy
- Succeeded by: Vijayasikhamani
- Constituency: Tirupati
- In office 1978–1983
- Preceded by: Vijayasikhamani
- Succeeded by: N. T. Rama Rao
- Constituency: Tirupati

Personal details
- Born: 28 December 1933; Thukivakam, Chittoor, Madras Presidency, British India
- Died: 16 February 2020 (aged 86); Sri Venkateswara Institute of Medical Sciences, Tirupati, Chittoor, Andhra Pradesh, India
- Political party: Indian National Congress

Agarala Eswara Reddi (also written as Agarala Eswara Reddy; 28 December 1933 – 16 February 2020) was an Indian writer and politician from Andhra Pradesh belonging to Indian National Congress. He served as the speaker and deputy speaker of the Andhra Pradesh Legislative Assembly.

== Biography ==
Reddi was born on 28 December 1933 at Thukivakam in Chittor. He was elected as a legislator of the Andhra Pradesh Legislative Assembly from Tirupati in 1967 and 1978.

Reddi served as the deputy speaker of the Andhra Pradesh Legislative Assembly from 27 March 1981 to 6 September 1982. He also served as the speaker of the Andhra Pradesh Legislative Assembly from 7 September 1982 to 16 January 1983. Besides politics he also authored seven books on public affairs.

Reddi died on 16 February 2020 at the age of 86.
