= Chittoor Assembly constituency =

Constituency of the Andhra Pradesh Legislative Assembly, India

Coordinates: 13.22°N 79.10°E

Chittoor
- Constituency No. 172 for the Andhra Pradesh Legislative Assembly
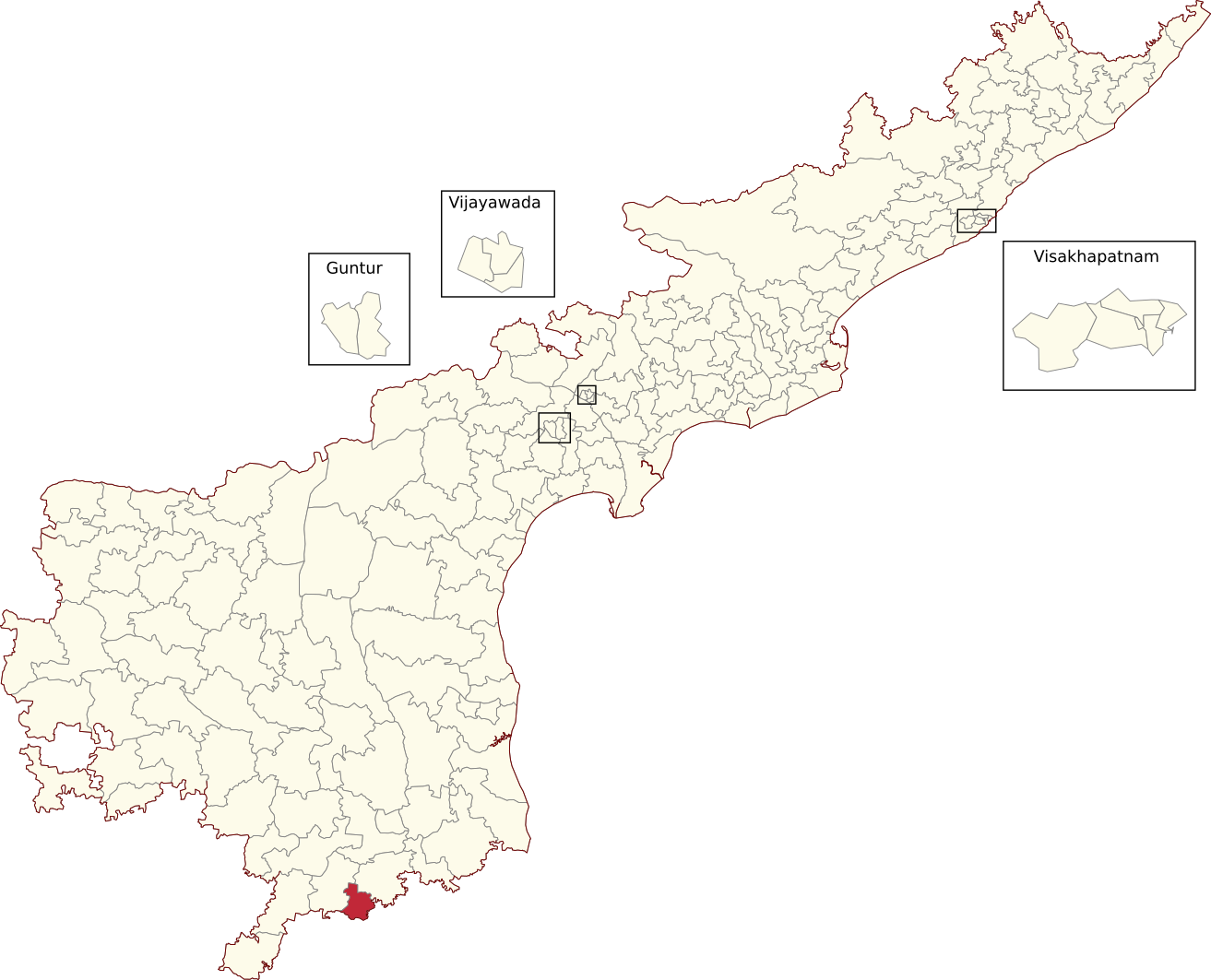
- Location of Chittoor Assembly constituency within Andhra Pradesh

Constituency details
- Country: India
- Region: South India
- State: Andhra Pradesh
- District: Chittoor
- Lok Sabha constituency: Chittoor
- Established: 1951
- Total electors: 193,089
- Reservation: None

Member of Legislative Assembly
- 16th Andhra Pradesh Legislative Assembly
- Incumbent Gurajala Jagan Mohan Naidu
- Party: TDP
- Alliance: NDA
- Elected year: 2024

Chittoor Assembly constituency is a constituency in Chittoor district of Andhra Pradesh that elects representatives to the Andhra Pradesh Legislative Assembly in India. It is one of the seven assembly segments of Chittoor Lok Sabha constituency.

Gurajala Jagan Mohan is the current MLA of the constituency, having won the 2024 Andhra Pradesh Legislative Assembly election from Telugu Desam Party. As of 2019, there are a total of 193,089 electors in the constituency. The constituency was established in 1951, as per the Delimitation Orders (1951).

== Mandals ==
Mandal
Chittoor
Gudipala

== Members of the Legislative Assembly ==
Year	Member	Political party
1952	Chinnama Reddy	Indian National Congress
1953 by-election	Srungaram	Krishikar Lok Party
1955	Chinnama Reddy	Indian National Congress
1962	C. D. Naidu	Swatantra Party
1967	D. A. Naidu	Indian National Congress
1972	D. Anianeyulu Naidu	Indian National Congress
1978	N. P. Venkateswara Choudary	Janata Party
1983	N. P. Jhansi Lakshmi	Telugu Desam Party
1985	R. Gopinathan	Indian National Congress
1989	C.K. Jayachandra Reddy	Independent
1994	C.K. Jayachandra Reddy	Indian National Congress
1999	C.K. Jayachandra Reddy	Indian National Congress
2004	A.S. Manohar	Telugu Desam Party
2009	C.K. Jayachandra Reddy	Indian National Congress
2014	D. A. Sathya Prabha	Telugu Desam Party
2019	Arani Srinivasulu	YSR Congress Party
2024	Gurajala Jagan Mohan Naidu	Telugu Desam Party

== Election results ==
=== 1952 ===
1952 Madras Legislative Assembly election: Chittoor
Party	Candidate	Votes	%	±%
Independent	Chinama Reddi	41,659	38.61%	
INC	N. P. Chengalraya Naidu	33,171	30.74%	30.74%
KLP	P. Rajagopala Naidu	33,080	30.66%	
KLP	Sreegaram			
Margin of victory		8,488	7.87%	
Turnout		1,07,910	66.64%	
Registered electors		1,61,933		
Independent win (new seat)				

=== 2009 ===
2009 Andhra Pradesh Legislative Assembly election: Chittoor
Party	Candidate	Votes	%	±%
INC	C. K. Jayachandra Reddy	46,094	36.29	
PRP	Arani Srinivasulu	44,384	34.94	
TDP	P. Balaji	30,790	24.24	
Majority		1,710	1.34	
Turnout		1,27,000	70.88	
INC hold		Swing		

=== 2014 ===
2014 Andhra Pradesh Legislative Assembly election: Chittoor
Party	Candidate	Votes	%	±%
TDP	D. A. Sathya Prabha	73,430	50.50	
YSRCP	Arani Srinivasulu	66,631	45.82	
Majority		6,799	4.67	
Turnout		1,45,409	75.52	
TDP hold		Swing		

=== 2019 ===
2019 Andhra Pradesh Legislative Assembly election: Chittoor
Party	Candidate	Votes	%	±%
YSRCP	Arani Srinivasulu	91,206	60.18	+14.36
TDP	A. S. Manohar	51,238	33.81	−16.69
Majority		39,968	26.37	
Turnout		1,51,550	78.12	
YSRCP gain from TDP		Swing		

=== 2024 ===
2024 Andhra Pradesh Legislative Assembly election: Chittoor
Party	Candidate	Votes	%	±%
TDP	Gurajala Jagan Mohan	88,066	52.49	
YSRCP	M.C Vijayananda Reddy	73,462	43.78	
INC	G Tikaraam	3,264	1.94	
NOTA	None Of The Above	1,096	0.65	
Majority		14,604	8.70	
Turnout		167,789		
TDP gain from YSRCP		Swing		

== See also ==
- Chittoor
