= N. P. Jhansi Lakshmi =

Indian politician

Member of the 8th Lok Sabha for Chittoor
- Preceded by: P. Rajagopal Naidu
- Succeeded by: M. Gnanendra Reddy

Personal details
- Born: 20 October 1941 Visakhapatnam, Andhra Pradesh, India
- Died: 19 December 2011 (aged 70) Hyderabad, Andhra Pradesh, India
- Party: Telugu Desam Party

N. P. Jhansi Lakshmi (20 October 1941 – 19 December 2011) was a politician from Andhra Pradesh who was elected to the 8th Lok Sabha and served one term in the Andhra Pradesh Legislative Assembly.

== Early life ==
Jhansi Lakshmi was born on 20 October 1941 in Visakhapatnam to the family of C. K. Chowdary. She received her education till matriculation.

== Career ==
As a member of the newly formed Telugu Desam Party, Jhansi Lakshmi contested the 1983 Andhra Pradesh Legislative Assembly election from Chittoor seat and defeated N. P. Venkateswara Chowdary of the Indian National Congress by a difference of 16,434 votes.

The following year, she stood for and won the general election for the 8th Lok Sabha from Chittoor, obtaining 3,32,543 votes. She was a regional organiser for Women and Child Welfare programs and secretary of Kasturba Centenary Committee. Lakshmi did not complete her term and resigned from the Lok Sabha.

== Personal life ==
Jhansi Lakshmi married N. P. Veeraraghavulu Naidu on 9 December 1956 and together they had two sons and one daughter. She died on 19 December 2011 at a private hospital in Hyderabad. She had been admitted there after suffering a heart attack ten days earlier.
