= M. S. Babu =

Indian politician

Member of the Legislative Assembly
- In office 23 May 2019 – 2024
- Preceded by: M. Sunil Kumar
- Succeeded by: Kalikiri Murali Mohan
- Constituency: Puthalapattu

Personal details
- Born: 1972 (age 53–54) Chittoor, Andhra Pradesh, India
- Party: Indian National Congress
- Other political affiliations: YSR Congress Party

M. S. Babu is an Indian politician and member of the Congress Party. He was elected as member of the Andhra Pradesh Legislative Assembly from the Puthalapattu constituency in Chittoor district on YSR Congress Party ticket from 23 May 2019.

== Political career ==
M. S. Babu started his political journey with the YSR Congress Party and contested as MLA from Puthalapattu constituency in 2019 Andhra Pradesh Legislative Assembly Election and won the MLA seat defeating his nearest rival L. Lalitha Kumari of TDP by a majority of 29,163 votes. In 2024 Assembly elections he was denied ticket from YSRCP and later he quit YSRCP and joined Congress in the presence of Andhra Pradesh Congress Committee President Y. S. Sharmila on 6 April 2024.
