= Puthalapattu Assembly constituency =

Constituency of the Andhra Pradesh Legislative Assembly, India

Coordinates: 13.38°N 79.09°E

Puthalapattu
- Constituency No. 173 for the Andhra Pradesh Legislative Assembly
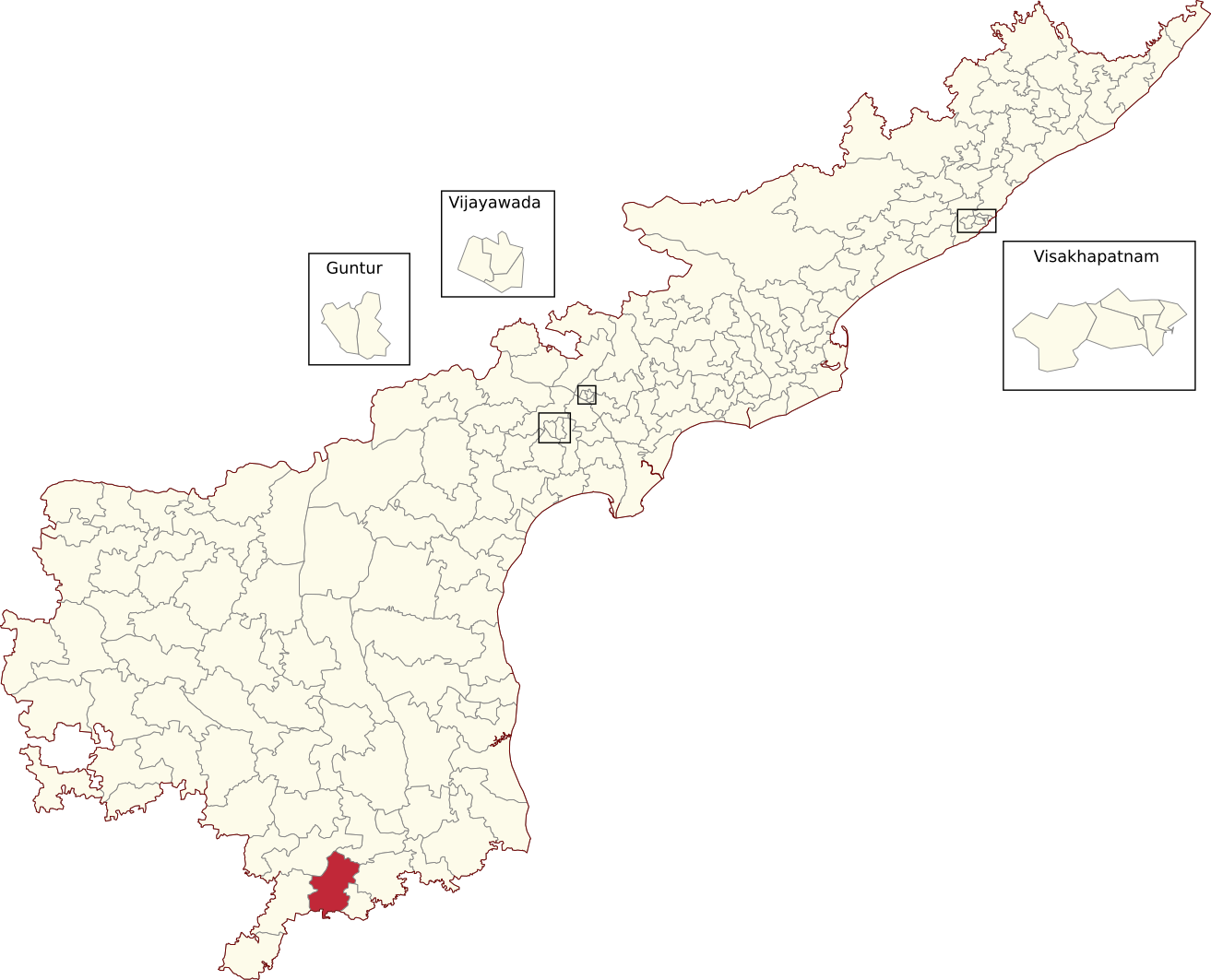
- Location of Puthalapattu Assembly constituency within Andhra Pradesh

Constituency details
- Country: India
- Region: South India
- State: Andhra Pradesh
- District: Chittoor
- Lok Sabha constituency: Chittoor
- Established: 2008
- Total electors: 215,183
- Reservation: SC

Member of Legislative Assembly
- 16th Andhra Pradesh Legislative Assembly
- Incumbent Kalikiri Murali Mohan
- Party: TDP
- Alliance: NDA
- Elected year: 2024

Puthalapattu is a consistency in Chittoor district of Andhra Pradesh that elects representatives to the Andhra Pradesh Legislative Assembly in India. It is one of the seven assembly segments of Chittoor Lok Sabha constituency.

Dr. Kalikiri Murali Mohan is the current MLA of the constituency, having won the 2024 Andhra Pradesh Legislative Assembly election from Telugu Desam Party. As of 2019, there are a total of 215,183 electors in the constituency. The constituency was established in 2008, as per the Delimitation Orders (2008).

== Mandals ==
Mandal
Irala
Puthalapattu
Thavanampalle
Bangarupalem
Yadamari

== Members of the Legislative Assembly ==
Year	Member	Political party
2009	P. Ravi	Indian National Congress
2014	M. Sunil Kumar	YSR Congress Party
2019	M. S. Babu	YSR Congress Party
2024	Dr. Kalikiri Murali Mohan	Telugu Desam Party

== Election results ==
=== 2009 ===
2009 Andhra Pradesh Legislative Assembly election: Puthalapattu
Party	Candidate	Votes	%	±%
INC	DR.P.Ravi	64,484	42.49	
TDP	L. Lalitha Kumari	63,533	41.86	
PRP	P. Pushparaj	17,627	11.62	
Majority		951	0.63	
Turnout		1,51,757	41.86	
INC win (new seat)				

=== 2014 ===
2014 Andhra Pradesh Legislative Assembly election: Puthalapattu
Party	Candidate	Votes	%	±%
YSRCP	M. Sunil Kumar	83,200	48.75	
TDP	L. Lalitha Kumari	82,298	48.23	
Majority		902	0.53	
Turnout		1,70,651	85.17	
YSRCP gain from INC		Swing		

=== 2019 ===
2019 Andhra Pradesh Legislative Assembly election: Puthalapattu
Party	Candidate	Votes	%	±%
YSRCP	M. S. Babu	103,265	55.25	
TDP	L. Lalitha Kumari	74,102	39.64	
Majority		29,163	0.53	15.61
Turnout		1,86,918	88	
YSRCP hold		Swing		

=== 2024 ===
2024 Andhra Pradesh Legislative Assembly election: Puthalapattu
Party	Candidate	Votes	%	±%
TDP	Kalikiri Murali Mohan	102,137	52.37	▲12.73
YSRCP	M. Suneel Kumar	86,503	44.36	▼10.89
INC	M. S. Babu	2,820	1.45	
NOTA	None Of The Above	1,420	0.73	
Majority		15,634	8.02	▲7.49
Turnout		1,95,018		
TDP gain from YSRCP		Swing		

== See also ==
- Puthalapattu
