= M. S. Raju (politician) =

Indian politician

M.S. Raju

Member of Andhra Pradesh Legislative Assembly
- Incumbent
- Assumed office 4 June 2024
- Preceded by: M. Thippeswamy
- Constituency: Madakasira

Personal details
- Party: Telugu Desam Party
- Occupation: Politician

M.S. Raju is an Indian politician and a current Member of Legislative Assembly for the state of Andhra Pradesh. He won from Madakasira Assembly Constituency in the 2024 elections.

== Politics ==
He is the member of Telugu Desam Party and serves as the SC Cell President.

== Election statistics ==
	Year	Contested For	Party	Constituency	Opponent	Opponent Party	Votes	Majority	Result
1	2024	MLA	Telugu Desam Party	Madakasira	Iralakkappa.S.L	YSRCP	79,983	351	Won
