= Naramalli Sivaprasad =

Indian politician and actor (1951–2019)

Member of Parliament, Lok Sabha
- In office 2009–2019
- Preceded by: D. K. Adikesavulu Naidu
- Succeeded by: N. Reddeppa
- Constituency: Chittoor

Personal details
- Born: 10 June 1951 Pultipalli, Chittoor district, Andhra Pradesh, India
- Died: 21 September 2019 (aged 68) Chennai, Tamil Nadu, India
- Party: Telugu Desam
- Relations: Radhika (niece)

Naramalli Sivaprasad (10 June 1951 – 21 September 2019) was an Indian film actor-director turned politician, belonging to Telugu Desam Party.

== Policial career ==
In the 2009 election he was elected to the Lok Sabha from the Chittoor constituency in Andhra Pradesh. He dressed himself up in many roles, when protesting against the bifurcation of Andhra Pradesh state, and when demanding for special status for Andhra Pradesh. He was also one of the MPs who were suspended for protesting in Indian Parliament against the bifurcation of the state.

== Personal life ==
Popular playback singer Radhika was his niece.

== Filmography ==
As actor
This is a partial list of films in which Naramalli Sivaprasad appeared:

- Idhi Kaadu Mugimpu (1983) as Balaramayya, the moneylender
- Khaidi (1983)
- Daku (1984)
- Dandayatra (1984)
- Lady James Bond (1985)
- Mayadari Maridi (1985)
- Punnami Ratri (1985)
- Kanchu Kavacham (1985)
- Vetagallu (1986) as Detective
- Donga Kollu (1988)
- Anna Chellelu (1988)
- Preminchi Choodu (1989) as Anjaneyulu
- Master Kapuram (1990)
- Madam (1994)
- Danger (2005)
- Jai Chiranjeeva (2005)
- Balu ABCDEFG (2005)
- Lakshmi (2006)
- Kithakithalu (2006)
- Baladur (2008)
- Aatadista (2008)
- Okka Magaadu (2008)
- Kuberulu (2008)
- Drona (2009)
- Brahmi Gadi Katha (2011)
- Pilla Zamindar (2011)
- Ayyare (2012)
- Chammak Challo (2013)
- Sapthagiri LLB (2017)
- Software Sudheer (2019)

As director

- Prema Thapassu (1991; also singer)
- Topi Raja Sweety Roja (1996; also lyricist)

== Awards ==
- Nandi Award for Best Villain – Danger (2005)
