= M. Gnanendra Reddy =

Indian politician

Mahasamudram Gnanendra Reddy

Member of Parliament, Lok Sabha
- In office 1989 - 1996
- Preceded by: N. P. Jhansi Lakshmi
- Succeeded by: Nuthanakalva Ramakrishna Reddy
- Constituency: Chittoor

Personal details
- Born: 7 June 1947 Penumuru, Chittoor District, Andhra Pradesh
- Party: YSR Congress Party
- Spouse: Smt. M. Jayaprada
- As of September, 2000

Mahasamudram Gnanedra Reddy (born 1 December 1947), also known as MG Reddy, is an Indian politician served as a member of the 9th Lok Sabha of India. He represented the Chittoor constituency of Andhra Pradesh. He was re-elected in the 10th Lok Sabha General Election in 1991 for Chittoor Andhra Pradesh.
