= Daggumalla Prasada Rao =

Indian politician

Member of Parliament, Lok Sabha
- Incumbent
- Assumed office 2024
- Preceded by: N. Reddeppa
- Constituency: Chittoor

Personal details
- Party: Telugu Desam Party
- Occupation: Politician

Daggumalla Prasada Rao is an Indian politician and the elected candidate for Lok Sabha from Chittoor Lok Sabha constituency. He is a member of the Telugu Desam Party.

== See also ==
- 18th Lok Sabha
- Telugu Desam Party
- Chittoor Lok Sabha constituency
