= Chadalawada Krishnamurthy =

Indian politician and social activist

Chadalawada Krishna Murthy
- Born: 1 May 1948 (age 78); Naidupeta
- Education: MA PhD
- Occupations: Politician, social activist
- Notable work: Ex MLA from Tirupati constituency
- Political party: TDP (before 18 October 2018); Jana Sena Party (18 October 2018 – present)
- Board member of: ex Chairman of Tirumala Tirupati Devasthanam (TTD) Board of Trustees
- Spouse: Sucharita
- Children: Three (one son died)

Chadalawada Krishnamurthy (born 1 May 1948) is an Indian politician and social activist. He was an MLA in the Andhra Pradesh Legislative Assembly from the Tirupati assembly constituency. He was the Chairman of Tirumala Tirupati Devasthanam (TTD) Board of Trustees. He belongs to the Balija social community.

== Early life ==
Chadalawada Krishnamurthy was born on 1 May 1948 in Chennur village of Nellore district. He was born to Venkata Subbanna and Venkata Ramanamma. His native village is Naidu Peta of Nellore District. He is a Postgraduate with a Doctorate in MA. He is the Chairman of Chadalawada Charitable Trust to serve the needy.

== Political career ==
Krishnamurthy evinced interest in politics in 1973, influenced by Mrs. Indira Gandhi's policies and programmes to serve the people of his nation. He was the youth congress president for Nellore district from 1976 to 1977 under the leadership of Sri Sanjay Gandhi.

He was elected surpanch for Naidupeta Major Gram Panchayat in the 1981 elections. During this tenure, with keen interest in the developmental activities, all the developments have been positioned in that place. The government awarded the best surpanch of the state award in the year 1983 for the development evidenced. He was deeply attached to public service and was then elected as General Secretary for APCC. He applied for a ticket for assembly election from the Tirupati Assembly constituency in the 1994 elections, the main reasons for selecting this place, his native constituency comes under reserved category, Tirupati is well-placed with a key reputation. He has his social service activities of free drinking water supply to people in need, free medical treatment with a permanently established centre, and is also very much attached to his native place. But the high command issued the ticket from Srikalahasti constituency, as an acme follower of the Late Sri Rajiv Gandhi's vision for the nation. He obeyed the orders of high command and contested the elections from the Srikalahasti constituency with a Congress ticket. He lost in the elections by a very narrow margin of 1580 votes.

Ahead of the 1999 Andhra Pradesh Legislative Assembly election, Krishnamurthy sought the Indian National Congress nomination for the Tirupati constituency. However, the party leadership denied his request and directed him to contest from Srikalahasti instead. In response to local constituents' demands, he defected to the Telugu Desam Party (TDP). Contesting on the TDP ticket, Krishnamurthy was elected as the Member of the Legislative Assembly (MLA) for Tirupati by a margin of approximately 15,000 votes. During his tenure, he focused on infrastructural development across the constituency. He also survived an assassination attempt while traveling with Chief Minister N. Chandrababu Naidu, when suspected People's War Group militants detonated a series of Claymore mines targeting their convoy on the Tirumala ghat road.

== Political postings ==
The Andhra Pradesh Government, on 27 April 2015, appointed Chadalavada Krishnamurthy as the Chairman of Tirumala Tirupati Devasthanam (TTD) Board of Trustees, a body which administers Tirupati's Lord Venkateswara temple for his dedication, application, and determination towards public services.

== Social services ==
It is his privilege to serve the people of Tirupati, Srikalahasti, and Naidupet Constituencies' public with social work of rendering the free service to the needy people in Government departments whenever necessary and extending support to the poor people with Medical and Educational facilities. He established one permanent Dental hospital in Tirupathi to serve the people free of cost for their treatment and also distributed pensions for old age people and performed several times mass marriages at his own expense. He has been supplying free drinking water to the BPL people of Tirupathi and the Naidu pet towns for twenty years, with their own infrastructure at their doorsteps.
