= Kalikiri Murali Mohan =

Indian politician from Andhra Pradesh

Member of the Andhra Pradesh Legislative Assembly
- Incumbent
- Assumed office June 2024
- Preceded by: M. S. Babu
- Constituency: Puthalapattu

Personal details
- Party: Telugu Desam Party
- Profession: Politician

Kalikiri Murali Mohan (born 1974) is an Indian politician from Andhra Pradesh. He is an MLA from Puthalapattu Assembly constituency in Chittoor district. He represents Telugu Desam Party. He won the 2024 Andhra Pradesh Legislative Assembly election where TDP had an alliance with BJP and JSP.

== Early life and education ==
Mohan is from Puthalapattu, Chittoor. His father's name is Kalikiri Annaiah. He is a postgraduate in commerce and also completed his PhD. from Sri Venkateswara University, Tirupati in 2013. He started his career as a journalist with Andhra Bhoomi and worked for a long time with HMTV. He also worked for other newspapers and channels. He is a member of the Tirupati Press Club and also served as an office bearer of Andhra Pradesh Union of Working Journalists.

== Career ==
Mohan won the 2024 Andhra Pradesh Legislative Assembly election from Puthalapattu Assembly constituency representing Telugu Desam Party. He polled 102,137 votes and defeated M. Sunil Kumar of YSR Congress Party by 15,634 votes.
