= D. K. Adikesavulu Naidu =

Indian politician

Member of Parliament, Lok Sabha
- In office 2004 - 2009
- Preceded by: Nuthanakalva Ramakrishna Reddy
- Succeeded by: Naramalli Sivaprasad
- Constituency: Chittoor

Personal details
- Born: 21 September 1940 Chittoor, Andhra Pradesh
- Died: 24 April 2013 (aged 72) Bengaluru
- Party: Indian National Congress
- Spouse: D. K. Sathyaprabha
- Children: Srinivas, Kalpaja, Tejeshwari Srinivasamurthy
- As of 16 September, 2006

D. K. Adikesavulu Naidu (21 September 1940 – 24 April 2013) was a member of the 14th Lok Sabha of India. He represented the Chittoor constituency of Andhra Pradesh when he was the member of the Telugu Desam Party. He was the Chairman of Tirumala Tirupati Devasthanams and was a member of the Indian National Congress.

== Career ==
Naidu was born into a family of extremely humble means and he received little education. At a young age, he took up a job at the liquor distillery in his native Chittoor district. He learnt the ropes there and later took a small nearly brewery on lease. This village brewery was only of 'Arrack' or country liquor, consumed by low-class, poor villagers. He assiduously cultivated local politicians, especially those with muscle power at their command, who could use strong arm to help him deal with business problems. Soon, he moved a little up the ladder and cultivated Ramakrishna Hegde, plying the Janata Party leader with money and muscle power at a time when that party was badly in need of both funds and muscle power, because Indira Gandhi was trying to destroy the Janata politicians. Thanks to Ramakrishna Hegde, Adikeshavulu got many arrack contracts at high price and made a killing. Some part of the money was funnelled back to his politician friends. he made a vast fortune this way, but one bad result was that the "arrack scam" became a very big scam in the press and was one of the main reasons why the Hegde government fell in Karnataka. By this time, the very flexible Adikesavulu had jumped ship and moved to the Congress party. It is said that Adikesavulu had supplied the Congress party with much of the fodder to create the scandal and uproar, because the demands of Hegde and others had become excessive, and also because he saw that the Congress party was on the upswing in Karnataka and anyway, it was always very strong in his native Andhra Pradesh, where his main businesses were located (in Chittoor district).

=== The Mallya years ===
As a member of the Congress party, Adikesavulu prospered beyond his dreams. People of a certain age will remember that the 1980s and 1990s were the era when the influence of "liquor barons" and their money and muscle power was all-pervasive in Karnataka politics, just like the influence of "mining barons" in recent years. Adikesavulu used every means possible, whether legal or not, to further his business and prospered in extraordinary way. He entered the Indian Made Foreign Liquor (IMFL) field and minted money. He became a particularly close associate of Vijay Mallya. Indeed, Mallya was Adikesavulu's mentor as he climbed up the ladder from country liquor to IMFL and then to real estate, private education and other such lucrative sectors, which were the main political-interest sectors in those day and which were flush with black money. Mallya and Adikesavulu were totally close to each other and used each other's political connections and even financial resources as required. No two businessmen could ever be more close than Adikesavulu and Mallya. They also actively promoted each other's political careers. Both of them were also agnostic in politics, meaning that they had no ideology except self-interest. They cut deals with all parties as it suited them, supplied money and muscle to everyone, and moved from party to party as expedient. At this time, both of them cultivated the JDS in Karnataka and the Telugu Desam Party (TDP) in Andhra Pradesh. Again, as with Ramakrishna Hegde, the duo targeted these parties at a time when these parties were in dire need of funds and manpower. Adikesavulu's engagement with the TDP became a serious relationship, both of money and manpower, and once again, country liquor (arrack) played a major role. Once again, there was scandal, this time in Andhra Pradesh, after Chandrababu Naidu auctioned very lucrative contracts to Adikesavulu at a throwaway price. The scandal died down, and Adikesavulu formally joined the Telugu Desam.

In the process of all this deal-making, Adikesavulu and Mallya prospered both financially and in other ways. For instance, both of them were appointed trustees of the Tirumala Tirupati Devasthanam, the governing body of India's richest and most-visited temple. Indeed, Adikesavulu was made Chairman of that trust, an outrageous appointment given that his business was brewing liquor. Both of them also prospered in politics. Mallya took the help of the BJP and JDS to get elected to the Rajya Sabha from Karnataka.

Eventually, Adikesavulu managed businesses such as Karnataka breweries and distilleries, Mallya Hospital, Vydehi Institute of Medical Sciences, Sreenivasa institute of technology and management studies (SITAMS). He launched a fruit-crushing unit near Bangarupalyam in Chittoor district.

Adikesavulu died on 24 April 2013 in Vydehi hospital, Bengaluru.
