= Gurajala Jagan Mohan =

Indian politician

Member of Legislative Assembly Andhra Pradesh
- Incumbent
- Assumed office 2024
- Preceded by: Arani Srinivasulu
- Constituency: Chittoor

Personal details
- Party: Telugu Desam Party

Gurajala Jagan Mohan (born 15 January 1983) is an Indian politician from Andhra Pradesh. He is also a realtor, businessman and a former film producer. He is an MLA from Chittoor Assembly constituency in Chittoor district. He represents Telugu Desam Party. He won the 2024 Andhra Pradesh Legislative Assembly election where TDP had an alliance with BJP and Jana Sena Party.

== Early life and education ==
Mohan was born in Gudipala mandal, Chittoor, in present-day Andhra Pradesh, into an agricultural family. He is the son of Gurajala Chennakeshavulu Naidu. He later moved to Bangalore, where he was a realtor and developer. He also developed educational institutions. He also ventured into the film industry, establishing a production house named Unicraft Movies and produced the movie Manalo Okkadu, directed by R. P. Patnaik.

== Career ==
Mohan won the 2024 Andhra Pradesh Legislative Assembly election from Chittoor Assembly constituency representing Telugu Desam Party. He polled 88,066 votes and defeated his nearest rival, M.C Vijayananda Reddy of YSR Congress Party, by a margin of 14, 605 votes.
