= M. V. Gangadhara Siva =

Indian politician

Member of Parliament
- Constituency: Cuddapah constituency

Personal details
- Born: 1898 Cuddapah, Madras Presidency, British India (Now Andhra Pradesh, India)
- Party: Indian National Congress
- Spouse: Nagamani
- Children: 1 son

M. V. Gangadhara Siva (born 1898) was an Indian politician and member of Indian Parliament.

He is son of M. Varadarajulu; born at Cuddapah in 1898. He was educated at Municipal High School, Cuddapah and Wesley College, Madras. He married Shrimati Nagamani in 1935. They had a son.

He was member of Madras Legislative Council between 1926–1931 and member of Provisional Parliament, 1950–1951.

He was elected to 1st and 2nd Lok Sabha from Chittoor (Lok Sabha constituency) in 1952 and 1957 as a member of Indian National Congress.

He was member of Planning Committee, Prohibition Committee, Central Health Advisory Committee, and Commerce and Industries Advisory Committee. He was member of All India Institute of Medical Sciences, Andhra University Senate and Employees State Insurance Corporation.

He was founder and president of the Ceded District Depressed Class Association, Cuddapah.
