= M. Suguna =

Politician from Andhra Pradesh

Mannuru Suguna
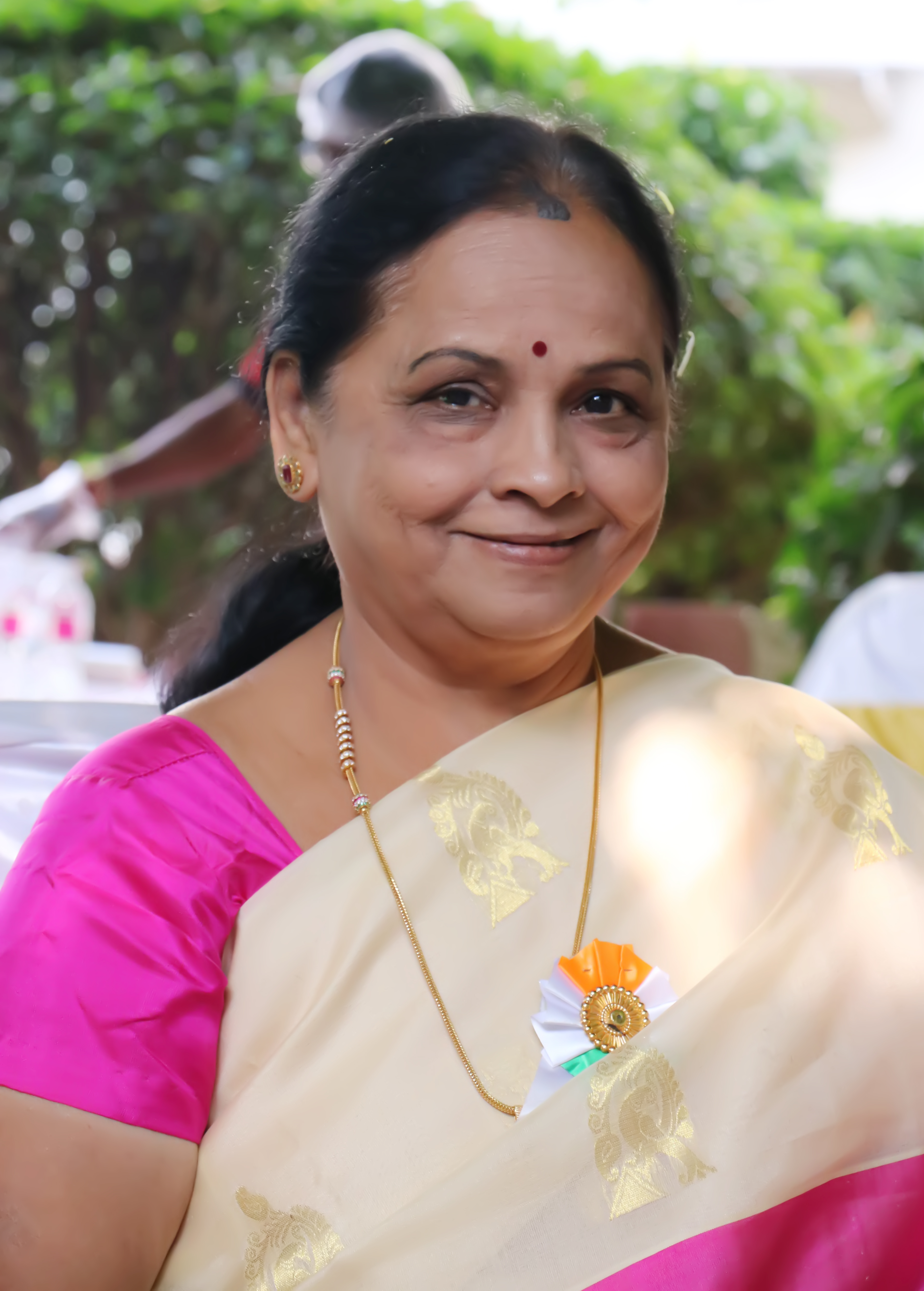
- Born: 10 February 1952
- Education: MA English Literature
- Notable work: Ex-MLA Of Tirupati constituency
- Political party: Telugu Desam Party
- Spouse(s): Mannuru Venkata Ramana (Ex-MLA, Tirupati)
- Children: Two daughters
- Awards: Swacch Sarvekshan Award

Mannuru Suguna (born 10 February 1952) is an Indian politician from Andhra Pradesh. She was an MLA in Andhra Pradesh Legislative Assembly representing Telugu Desam Party from Tirupati assembly constituency from 2015 to 2019. TDP has denied ticket to her to contest from Tirupati Assembly Constituency for the 2024 election.

She was appointed as AP Greening and Beautification Corporation Chairperson on 11 May 2025.

== Early life ==
Mannuru Suguna (also known as Sugunamma) was born to a Telugu-speaking family in Kadapa from Balija community. Her father Kondeti Subharamayya is a business person, and her mother is Venkatamma. Her family moved to Tirupati when she was two years old and settled there. She has a master's degree from Sri Padmavati Mahila Visvavidhyalaya.

== Political career ==
Mannuru Suguna entered politics following the death of her husband M. Venkatarmana. She was elected as a Member of Legislative Assembly (MLA) for Tirupati constituency in 2015 by-election that was caused by the death of her husband. Suguna won by a margin of 116,524 votes. In 2019 elections, she contested again but lost the Tirupati seat by a margin of 736 votes.
