= N. Amarnath Reddy =

Indian politician

Member of Andhra Pradesh Legislative Assembly
- Incumbent
- Assumed office 4 June 2024
- Preceded by: N. Venkate Gowda
- Constituency: Palamaner
- In office 2009–2019
- Preceded by: constituency established
- Succeeded by: N. Venkate Gowda
- Constituency: Palamaner
- In office 2004–2009
- Preceded by: N. Sreedhar Reddy
- Succeeded by: Peddireddy Ramachandra Reddy
- Constituency: Punganur
- In office 1996–1999
- Preceded by: Nuthanakalva Ramakrishna Reddy
- Succeeded by: N. Sreedhar Reddy
- Constituency: Punganur

Personal details
- Party: Telugu Desam Party
- Occupation: Politician

N. Amarnath Reddy (born 1959) is an Indian politician from Andhra Pradesh. He is a five time legislator and current Member of the Legislative Assembly representing Telugu Desam Party from Palamaner Assembly constituency. N. Amarnath Reddy held a ministerial post in the Andhra Pradesh state government. Specifically, he was appointed the Minister for Industries & Commerce in April 2017.

== Career ==
Reddy won as an MLA for the first time from Punganur Assembly constituency winning the 2004 Andhra Pradesh Legislative Assembly election representing Telugu Desam Party. He polled 71,492 votes and defeated his nearest rival, R. Reddappa Reddy of Indian National Congress, by a margin of 9,174 votes. He was elected again in the 2009 Andhra Pradesh Legislative Assembly election for the second time from Palamaner Assembly constituency.

He later joined the YSR Congress Party before 2014 Andhra Pradesh Legislative Assembly election and won for the third time as a candidate of YSR Congress Party from Palamaner Assembly constituency.

In 2016, he rejoined Telugu Desam Party and became a minister in the Third N. Chandrababu Naidu ministry.

== Election results ==
=== 2009 ===
2009 Andhra Pradesh Legislative Assembly election: Palamaner
Party	Candidate	Votes	%	±%
TDP	N.Amarnath Reddy	79,977	46.2	
INC	R. Reddeppa Reddy	64,429	37.2	
Majority		15,548	9	
Turnout		1,97,912	84.41	
YSRCP hold		Swing		

=== 2014 ===
2014 Andhra Pradesh Legislative Assembly election: Palamaner
Party	Candidate	Votes	%	±%
YSRCP	N.Amarnath Reddy	96,683	48.86	
TDP	R.V.Subash Chandra Bose	93,833	47.40	
Majority		2,850	1.46	
Turnout		197,912	84.41	
YSRCP hold		Swing		

=== 2019 ===
2019 Andhra Pradesh Legislative Assembly election: Palamaner
Party	Candidate	Votes	%	±%
YSRCP	N Venkate Gowda	119,241	54.46	+5.60
TDP	N. Amarnath Reddy	86,995	40.02	−7.38
Majority		32,246	14.44	
Turnout		218,957	88.60	+4.19
YSRCP hold		Swing		

=== 2024 ===
2024 Andhra Pradesh Legislative Assembly election: Palamaner
Party	Candidate	Votes	%	±%
TDP	N. Amarnath Reddy	101,417		
YSRCP	N Venkate Gowda	85,959		
INC	B Siva Sankar	3,014		
NOTA	None of the Above	2,006		
Majority				
Turnout				
		Swing		
