= Bhumana Karunakar Reddy =

Indian politician (born 1958)

Bhumana Karunakar Reddy (born 5 April 1958) is an Indian politician from Andhra Pradesh. He was the MLA from the Tirupati Assembly constituency in the erstwhile Chittoor district — since renamed the Tirupati district — from 2019 to 2024. He won the 2019 Andhra Pradesh Legislative Assembly election representing the YSR Congress Party.

== Early life and education ==
Reddy was born in Padmavathipuram, Tirupati mandal, Chittoor district to late Bhumana Jayaram Reddy. He completed BA from S.V. University, Tirupati, in 1980. Later, he did his M.A. He runs his own Business. His son Bhumana Abhinay Reddy was elected as deputy mayor of Tirupati in July 2021.

== Career ==
Reddy began his political career with the Indian National Congress in 2004. He served as the chairman of Tirupati Urban Development Authority from 2004 to 2006. Later, he was the chairman of Tirupati Thirumala Devasthanam Board from 2006 to 2008. He joined YSR Congress Party and won the 2012 Andhra Pradesh Byelection from Tirupati Assembly constituency defeating M. Venkataramana of Indian National Congress by a margin of 17,975 votes. He lost the 2014 Andhra Pradesh Legislative Assembly election to Venkataramana but regained the seat winning the 2019 Andhra Pradesh Legislative Assembly election defeating M. Suguna of Telugu Desam Party by a narrow margin of 708 votes. He was nominated again as TTD chairman in August 2023.
