= Puthalapattu =

- Village
- Railway Station
- Interactive map of Puthalapattu
- Location in Andhra Pradesh, India
- Coordinates: 13°23′08″N 79°04′31″E
- Country: India
- State: Andhra Pradesh
- District: Chittoor
- Mandal: Puthalapattu

Government
  - Type: Government of Andhra Pradesh
  - Body: Member of Andhra Pradesh Legislative Council
  - MLA: Murali mohan (TDP)

Population (2011)
  - Total: 5,583

Languages
  - Official: Telugu
- Time zone: UTC+5:30 (IST)
- PIN: 517124
- Telephone code: +91–8572
- Vehicle registration: AP 03

Puthalapattu is a village and mandal headquarters of Puthalapattu mandal in Chittoor district of the Indian state of Andhra Pradesh. It is the mandal headquarters of Puthalapattu mandal. Puthalapattuis suburban of Chittoor city.

== Demographics ==
As per Population Census 2011 the Puthalapattu village has population of 5583 of which 2787 are males while 2796 are females, population of children is 541. Sex Ratio of the village is 1003 which is higher than Andhra Pradesh state average of 993, child Sex Ratio of the Puthalapattu is 859. literacy rate of Puthalapattu village was 77.33% compared to 67.02% of Andhra Pradesh.

== Public Representatives ==
Murali mohan - Member of Andhra Pradesh Legislative Council, Puthalapattu (belongs to TDP)

== Educational Institutions ==
There are multiple educational institutions in Puthalapattu as per Board of Intermediate Education, Andhra Pradesh.

- Government Junior College
- Zilla Parishad High School
- Bheemeshwar Junior College
- Bheemeshwar Degree College
- Margadarsi English Medium School
- Nava Bharath English Medium School
- VEMU Institute of Technology, P.Kothakota

== Transport ==
APSRTC runs bus services from Chittoor and Tirupati to this village. NH 140 connects the village with Tirupati road. South Indian Railway runs train services from Chittoor and Tirupathi through this village.
