= Ramji Raghavan =

Social innovator and entrepreneur

- Education: MBA
- Alma mater: London Business School International Institute of Social Studies; University of Delhi
- Occupations: Founder and Chairperson, Agastya International Foundation
- Known for: Agastya International Foundation
- Website: www.agastya.org

Ramji Raghavan is a social innovator and entrepreneur. He is the founder and chairperson of Agastya International Foundation Non Profit Organizations. Ramji served as a member of the Central Advisory Board of Education, Government of India. He is member of the Governing Council of the Marico Innovation Foundation. He has also served as a board member of Vigyan Prasar and as a member of the Working Group on Attracting Children to Science and Math of the Prime Minister's National Knowledge Commission. Ramji has spoken at Stanford, the Education World Forum, the annual INK Conference in association with TED, the Clinton Global Initiative, MIT Media Lab, Peking University, Indian Institute of Science, the Tata Institute of Fundamental Research the PanIIT Conference, the Confederation of Indian Industry, Deshpande Development Dialogue, the Indian Institute of Management – Bangalore, the WISE Summit 2014, Qatar and RAFT- Resource Area For Teaching, Bay Area, USA.

== Personal life and education ==
Ramji was raised in Bihar, Uttar Pradesh and Calcutta where his father KV Raghavan served as Managing Director of the ICI Group company, Alkali and Chemical Corporation of India Limited and later as chairman of Engineers India Limited and president of EID Parry Limited. Ramji's father and his maternal uncle, Dr. P. K. Iyengar, former chairman of the Indian Atomic Energy Commission were founder trustees of Agastya International Foundation. He was educated at the Rishi Valley School. He holds an MBA from the London Business School and a Post-Graduate Diploma in Development Studies from The International Institute of Social Studies, The Netherlands. He graduated from Hans Raj College, University of Delhi. Raghavan is married to Monica (née Sanghani), great great granddaughter of Devkaran Nanjee, the founder of Dena Bank.

== Career ==
Raghavan was a consultant with A. F. Ferguson & Co., followed by Citibank in India, Puerto Rico and New York City. Later he worked with the Europe-based Cedel Group in London as director and member of the strategic advisory group.

== Social work ==
In 1998, Ramji left his commercial career in banking and finance to create Agastya International Foundation, to provide science, math, art and design thinking education to over 30 million underprivileged children and 250,000 government school teachers across India. During his tenure, Agastya has pioneered many educational innovations at scale, including mobile science labs, lab-on-a-bike and peer-to-peer learning via mega science fairs for underprivileged children. Agastya's 172-acre campus creativity lab houses over fifteen experiential science, art and innovation centers, including the Ramanujan Math Park. In the late 1980s, Ramji met Janaki Ammal, wife of the mathematician, Srinivasa Ramanujan in Triplicane, Madras. In a blog appearing in a TIFR journal, Ramji mentions Mrs. Ramanujan telling him, "no one remembers my husband anymore". More than a decade later, a bust of Ramanujan was installed in the Agastya campus creativity lab. Agastya gifted identical busts to the Institute of Mathematical Sciences, Cambridge University, the Indian Institute of Science, Bangalore, TIFR’s Institute of Applicable Mathematics, Bangalore, the Indian Institute of Technology, Madras, MIT, and Stanford, USA. His daughter, Jeena Raghavan's painting of math genius Ramanujan, was purchased by Devesh Mody of Texas and gifted to Stanford. With support from the government of Andhra Pradesh, Ramji and his colleagues established a 172-acre campus creativity lab near Bangalore. In 2007 Agastya signed a MoU with stock market investor Rakesh Jhunjhunwala, which helped Agastya to scale its outreach activity and build its creative campus. In 2010 the Government of Karnataka signed a MoU with Agastya International Foundation to establish an ecosystem for hands-on science education in the state. Wisdom of Agastya, an illustrated book authored by Vasant Nayak and Shay Taylor of the MurthyNayak Foundation in Baltimore, USA, chronicles Ramji and his team's journey between 1999 and 2014 in building Agastya International Foundation.

In March 2021 Agastya announced the creation of Navam Innovation Foundation in partnership with the Pravaha Foundation of Hyderabad.

== Recognitions ==
In 2009, Ramji was elected as a senior fellow by Ashoka: Innovators for the Public. In 2011, Ramji was featured on Indian TV channel Times Now in its program Amazing Indians and honoured with the People's Hero award by the Coimbatore unit of Confederation of Indian Industry (CII) at its silver jubilee celebrations. In 2012, Ramji was featured on CNBC Awaaz's program "Bharat Bhagya Vidhata". Under Ramji's chairmanship Agastya International Foundation won the Google Global Impact Award 2013 and was ranked by The Rockefeller Foundation NextCentury Awards among the top 100 global innovators. In 2016 Ramji received the Deshpande Foundation's Sandbox Catalyst Award and the Innovation for India award from the Marico Innovation Foundation Ramji and Rakesh Jhunjhunwala were also featured on CNBC TV's Daan Utsav programme. In 2017 Ramji was awarded The Rotary Club of Madras East Vocational Skilling Excellence Award. He was also featured in the Stanford Social Innovation Review. In 2019 Agastya received an Andhra Pradesh State Green Award for its work in regenerating the ecosystem of its 172-acre campus, documented in a book, 'The Roots of Creativity'. In 2020 Ramji and Agastya International Foundation were featured in the book, 7 Sutras of Innovation by Nikhil Inamdar, which tracks the journeys of eight organizations that have scaled up to become top players in their own fields and are transforming India. In 2022 he was felicitated by Chelsea Clinton at the Clinton Global Initiative Meet in New York for Agastya’s commitment to reach 37 million children by 2027. In 2024, LID Publishing (UK) published The Moving of Mountains by Adhirath Sethi, (https://www.amazon.in/Moving-Mountains-Agastya-International-Foundation/dp/1911687441) which narrates the story of the Agastya Foundation's journey since inception. In October, 2024 Ramji was felicitated at the Children's Hope India Gala in New York with the Making a Difference Award and was presented a Citation by the County of Nassau.
