= Santhipuram mandal =

- Mandal
- Interactive Map Outlining mandal
- Location in Andhra Pradesh, India
- Coordinates: 12°52′N 78°24′E
- Country: India
- State: Andhra Pradesh
- District: Chittoor
- Mandal: Santhipuram
- Headquarters: Arimuthanapalle

Government
  - Body: Mandal Parishad

Population (2011)
  - Total: 61,789

Languages
  - Official: Telugu
- Time zone: UTC+5:30 (IST)

Santhipuram mandal is one of the 66 mandals in Chittoor district of the Indian state of Andhra Pradesh. The headquarters are located at Arimuthanapalle . The mandal is bounded by Ramakuppam, Kuppam and Gudupalle mandals..This mandal is under Kuppam Revenue Division.

== Demographics ==
As of 2011 census, the mandal had a population of 61,789. The total population constitute, 31,431 males and 30,358 females —a sex ratio of 966 females per 1000 males. 7,539 children are in the age group of 0–6 years, of which 3,938 are boys and 3,601 are girls. The average literacy rate stands at 62.85% with 34,096 literates.

== Towns and villages ==
As of 2011 census, the mandal has 13 settlements. It includes 1 town and 12 villages. Santhipuram (M) is the most populated, and well improved village and Nelapadu is the least populated village in the mandal. Transportation have state government services are available from Kuppam to Vijayawada, Tirupati, Hyderabad. For Tamil Nadu, services are available for Krishnagiri, Erode, Salem, Coimbatore, and for Karnataka services available to Kolar, KGF (Kolar gold fields). The settlements in the mandal are listed below:

1. Ammavaripeta
2. Anchinayanikuppam
3. Anikera
4. Arimuthanapalle
5. Banthimadugu Gollapalle
6. Bellakogila
7. Bendanakuppam
8. Bennayanuru
9. Boyanapalle
10. Cheemanapalle
11. Chillamanipalle
12. Chinagandlapalle
13. Chinnaradoddi
14. Chinthakampalle
15. Chowdampalle
16. Dandikuppam
17. Dommarathippana Palle
18. Donkumanipalle
19. Gellapalledinne
20. Gesikapalle
21. Gundusettipalle
22. Gunjarlapalle
23. Jalliganipalle
24. Jeedimanipalle
25. Joniganuru
26. Kadapalle
27. Kadirimuthanapalle
28. Kadiriobanapalle
29. Kalamaladoddi
30. Karlagatta
31. Karumatla
32. Kenamakulapalle
33. Kolamadugu
34. Konerukuppam
35. Kolalathimmanapalle
36. Krishnapuram
37. Madanapalle
38. Matam Santhampalle
39. Morasanapalle
40. Motakothuru
41. Muddanapalle
42. Nallappareddiyuru
43. Nallarallapalle
44. Nanjampeta
45. Pedduru
46. Poduru
47. Preethichamanur
48. Rallabaduguru
49. Redlapalle
50. Regadadinnepalle
51. Santhampalle
52. Sathu
53. Segareddla Gollapalli
54. Settiballa
55. Sivaramapuram
56. Sonnegownipalle
57. Sonnegownnipalle
58. Thammiganipalle
59. Thumsi
60. Vadagandlapalle
61. Veduruguttapalle
62. Vetagirikothur

== See also ==
- List of mandals in Andhra Pradesh
