= Kuppam =

Kuppam Kangundi Kuppam
- Municipality
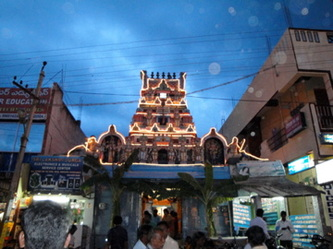
- Nickname: KPM (KPN)
- Location in Andhra Pradesh, India
- Coordinates: 12.75°N 78.37°E
- Country: India
- State: Andhra Pradesh
- District: Chittoor
- Mandal: Kuppam

Government
  - Type: Municipal Council
  - Body: Kuppam Area Development Authority

Area
  - Total: 3.10 km^{2} (1.20 sq mi)
- Elevation: 667 m (2,188 ft)

Population (2011)
  - Total: 21,963
  - Density: 7,080/km^{2} (18,300/sq mi)

Languages
  - Official: Telugu
- Time zone: UTC+5:30 (IST)
- PIN: 517425
- Telephone code: +91–08570
- Vehicle registration: AP-39 and AP-03
- Website: https://kada.ap.gov.in/

Kuppam is a town in Chittoor district of the Indian state of Andhra Pradesh. It is located 125 kilometres from the district headquarters Chittoor. It is the headquarters of Kuppam mandal in the Kuppam Revenue Division. The name "Kuppam" means a meeting place or confluence.

== Climate ==
Kuppam's climate is classified as tropical. When compared with winter, the summers have much more rainfall. This location is classified as Aw by Köppen and Geiger. The average annual temperature is 22.3 °C in Kuppam. The rainfall here averages 680 mm. Precipitation is the lowest in February, with an average of 2 mm. In October, the precipitation reaches its peak, with an average of 151 mm. At an average temperature of 28.0 °C, May is the hottest month of the year. At 18.0 °C on average, December is the coldest month of the year.

== Kuppam Area Development Authority (KADA) ==
Project Chairman :- Chittoor District Collector and Magistrate

Project Director :- Vikas Marmat IAS

Kuppam Area Development Authority with headquarters at Kuppam. It covers four mandals – Kuppam, Gudupalle, Santhipuram and Ramakuppam along with Kuppam municipality which forms part of Kuppam Revenue Division. It is meant for the overall economic growth, development, achieving sustainable development goals (SDGs) and zero poverty in the KADA region

The State government also reorganised the administrative structure of KADA to ensure a single line system for better coordination among various functionaries for an integrated approach. As such, it has re-designated the Special officer post as Project Director, KADA who will be directly responsible for planning and implementing all government programmes. The PD will review all the programmes and directly report to the Collector who shall be the Chairman of KADA.

== Demographics ==
As of 2011 census of India, Kuppam had a population of 21,963. The total population constitute, 11,091 males and 10,872 females - a sex ratio of 980 females per 1000 males. 2,551 children are in the age group of 0–6 years, of which 1,340 are boys and 1,211 are girls. The average literacy rate stands at 83.62% with 16,232 literates, significantly higher than the state average of 67.41%.

Languages of Kuppam based on 2011 Census
1. Telugu (53.7%)
2. Tamil (35.1%)
3. Urdu (7.13%)
4. Kannada (3.51%)
5. Others (0.49%)

=== Languages ===
Telugu is the official and most widely spoken language of the place. Tamil is second widely spoken among the natives. People can understand Kannada as it is located very near to Karnataka. Most people of Kuppam are trilingual.

== Industry ==
Kuppam is known for its granite quarries and factories. A granite variety, Kuppam Green, is named after the town as this variety is abundantly found in this area and exported to foreign countries on demand.

Kuppam has the presence of hydro Extrusion India Pvt Ltd. Hydro is a major aluminium extrusions company headquartered in Oslo, Norway. This has now been acquired by Hindalco Industries Ltd (Aditya Birla Group Company).

== Transport ==
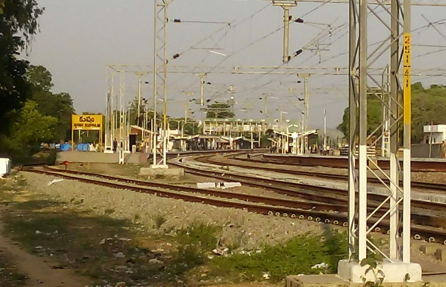
Railway Station, Kuppam

Kuppam is well connected by both Roadways (NH42) and Railways. Bus services are provided by state corporations APSRTC (Andhra Pradesh), TNSTC (Tamil Nadu) And Karnataka State Transport Corporation (KSRTC).

Chennai Central to K.S.R Bengaluru railway line passes through Kuppam (KPN) and it is the only one big railway station in the route belonging to Andhra Pradesh. Kuppam Railway Station comes under Bangalore Division, South Western Railways (SWR).

As Kuppam Railway Station (KPN) is located at the middle of Bangarapet railway junction and Jolarpettai railway junction, it is connected to Chennai, Vijawada, Coimbatore, Tirupati, Mysuru, Mumbai, Patna and Bengaluru via train. A train service is provided for people between Kuppam and K.S.R Bengaluru daily. There is an upcoming Kuppam Airport.

In 2024, Sri Chandrababu Naidu has announced seven new airports which are at Kuppam, Dagadarthi, Tuni-Annavaram*, Nagarjuna Sagar, Ongole, Srikakulam and Tadepalligudem in addition to the Bhogapuram Airport in between Vizianagaram and Visakhapatnam.

== Politics ==
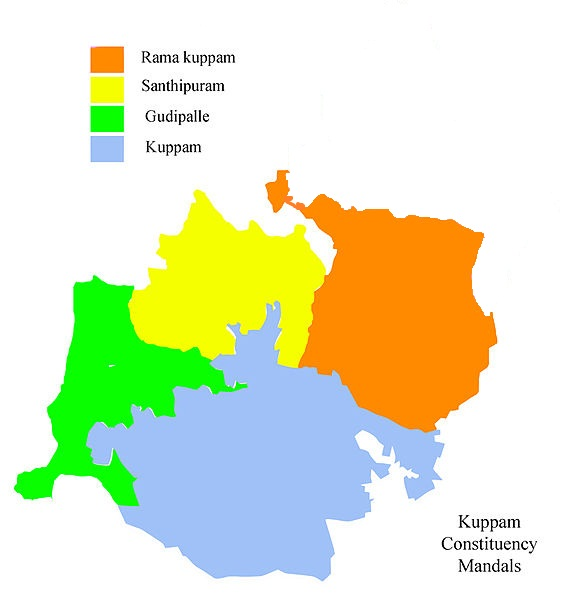
Kuppam constituency mandals

Kuppam is an assembly constituency (comprising Kuppam, Gudipalle, Shanthipuram, Ramakuppam mandals) in the Indian state of Andhra Pradesh. There are 1,61,872 registered voters in Kuppam constituency as of 1999. N. Chandrababu Naidu (current Chief Minister of Andhra Pradesh) is the current Member of Legislative Assembly (MLA) of Kuppam.

== Education ==
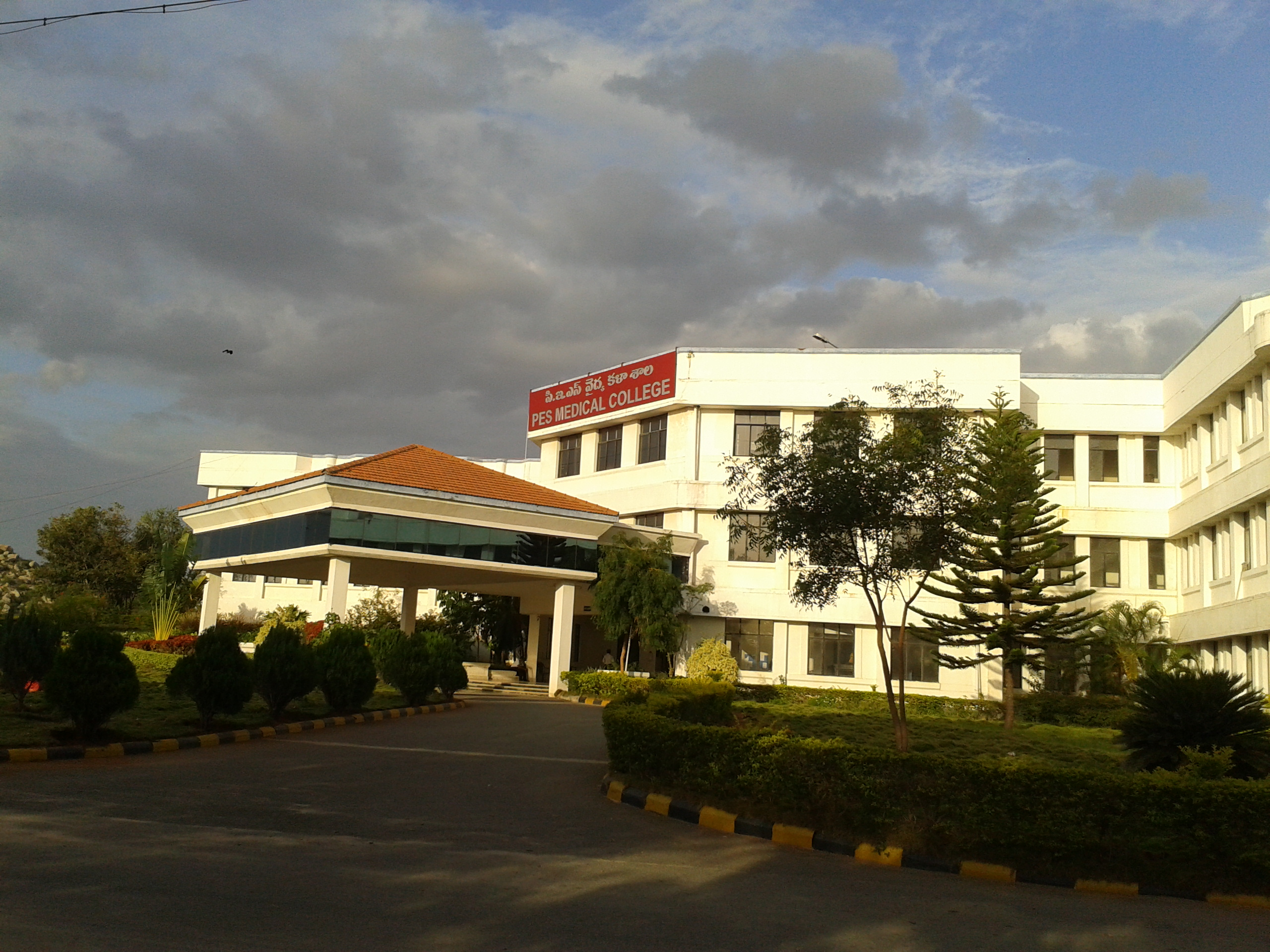
PES Medical College

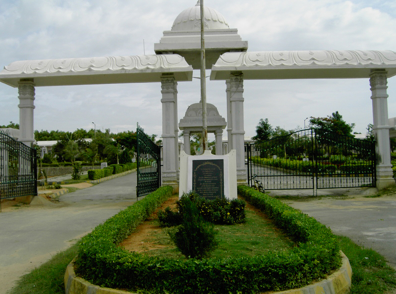
Dravidian University Entrance

Schools

Primary and secondary education in Kuppam is offered by various schools which are affiliated to one of the boards of education, such as the Secondary School Leaving Certificate (SSLC), Indian Certificate of Secondary Education (ICSE), Central Board for Secondary Education (CBSE). Schools in Kuppam are either government run or are private (both aided and un-aided by the government).

Medical College

P.E.S. Institute of Medical Sciences and Research was established in 2001 and offers Diploma, Under Graduation and Post Graduation courses in the field of Medicine.

University

Dravidian University was established in 1997 and offers different Under Graduation, Post Graduation and Research programs.

Engineering and Technology

Kuppam Engineering College was established in 2001 and offers different Under Graduation, Post Graduation and Research programs related to Engineering, Business Administration and Technology.

Agastya International Foundation

It has a "Campus Creativity Lab" located on a 172-acre campus in Kuppam, which houses science and art centers that includes an astronomy center and planetarium, center for creative teaching, an innovation hub, a science model-making center, the Ramanujan Math Park, an open-air ecology lab and many more. The campus receives over 650 children every day and also trains teachers from seven states in India.

== Culture ==
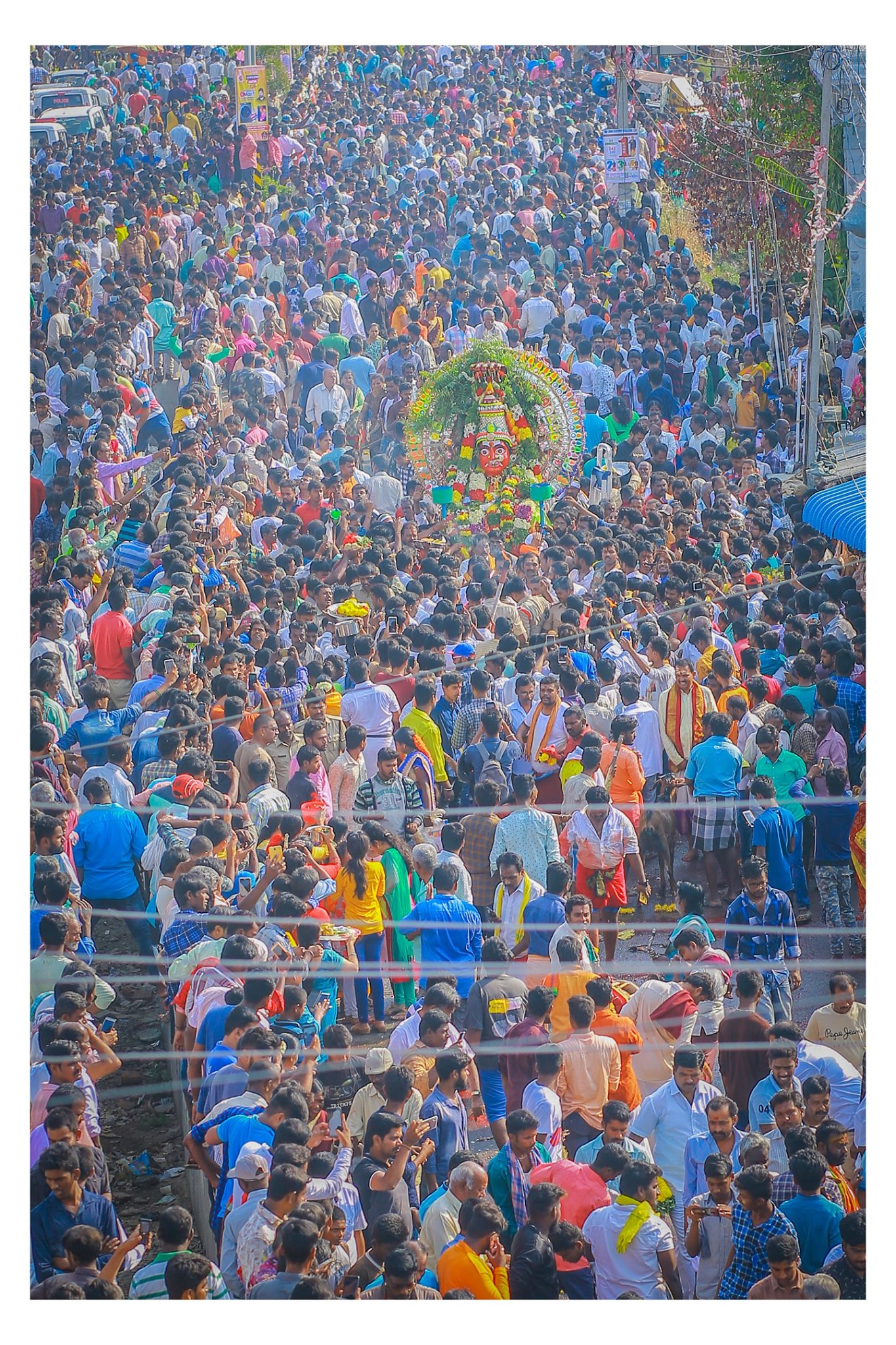
Tirupati Gangamma Jatara 2019, Kuppam

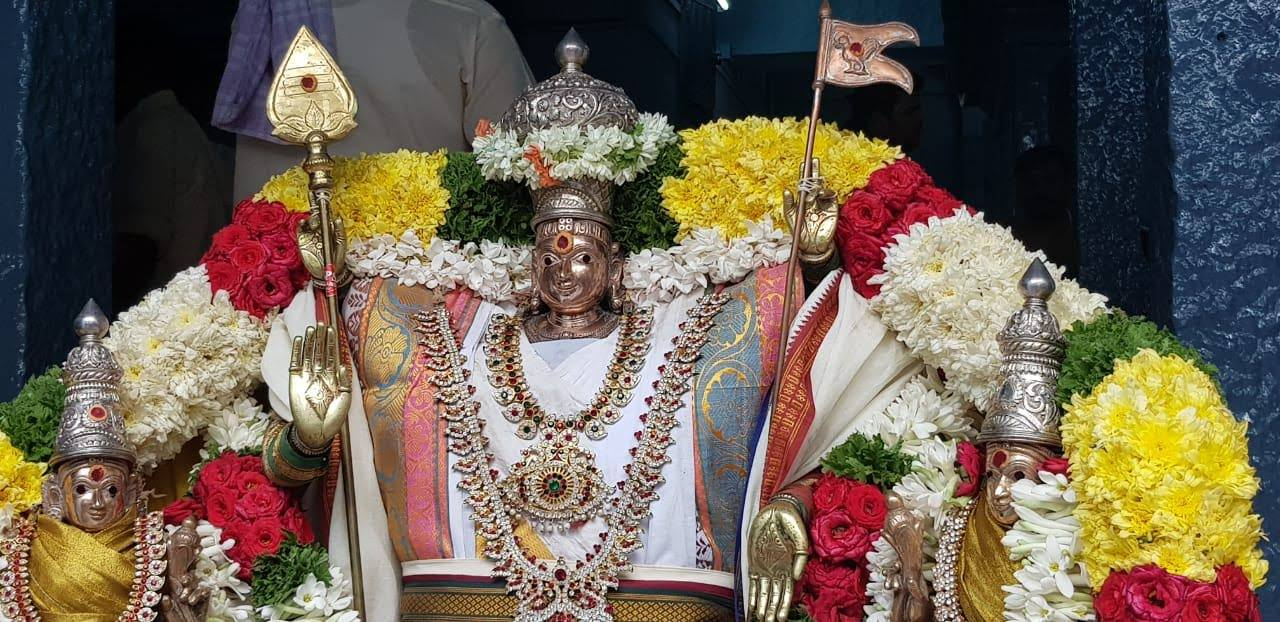
Aadi Krithika at Kuppam Sri Subrahmanyaswamy Devasthanam

"Sri Tirupati Gangamma Jathara Kuppam" is one of the most important and oldest festivals of Kuppam dedicated to the Hindu Goddess Gangamma Devi. It is celebrated annually, over a period of nine days in the month of May. The history of the festival dates back to over a couple of centuries. Local legend has it that Lord Venkateswara was upset with his sister Gangamma for devouring corpses at the burial ground. In order to stop his sister from doing so, the Lord chopped off Gangamma's cheek, which is believed to have fallen in

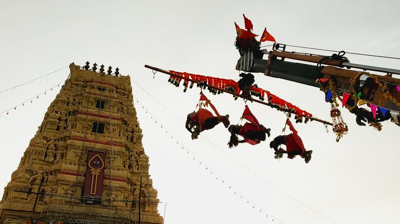
Devotees on Aadi Krithika - Gudivanka

Kuppam and surrounding areas like Tirupati, Chittoor, Punganur, Vaniyambadi and Gudiyattam. To mark this event, the annual jatara is celebrated in Kuppam. "Peddapuli Gangamma Jatara" is one of the important and the oldest festivals of Kuppam dedicated to the Hindu Goddess Peddapuli Gangamma Devi. "Aadi Krithika" is one of the important and the oldest festivals of Kuppam dedicated to the Tamil Hindu God Subrahmanyaswamy in the month of July or August (Aadi month - Tamil calendar). Other popular festivals in Kuppam are Ugadi, Ram Navami, Eid ul-Fitr, Ganesh Chaturthi, Deepawali and Christmas.

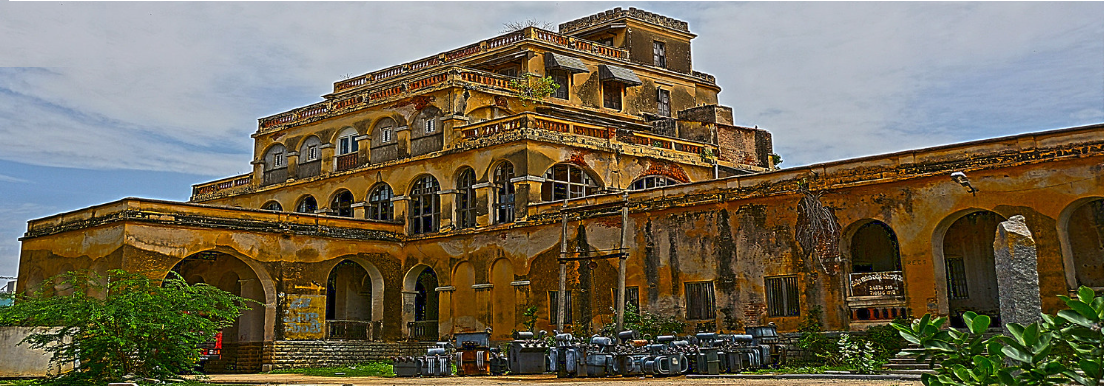
Kuppam Palace

== Notable people from Kuppam ==
Notable people from Kuppam include:

- Nara Chandrababu Naidu
- V. Nagayya
- Adyar K. Lakshman
- B. R. Panthulu

== See also ==
- List of census towns in Andhra Pradesh
