= National Mathematics Day (India) =

Celebration that commemorates the birthday of Srinivasa Ramanujan

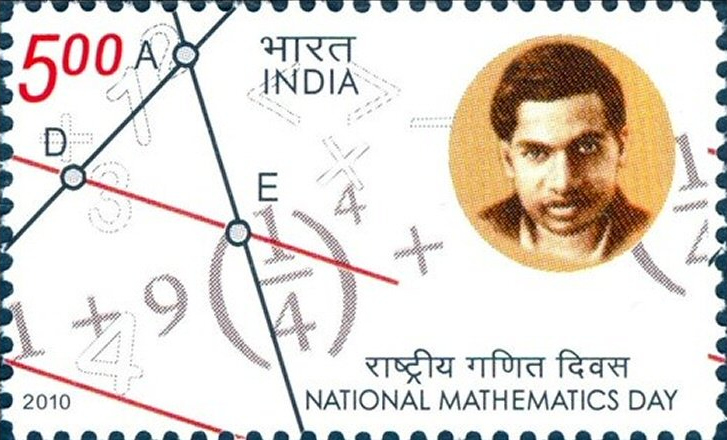
An Indian stamp depicting Srinivasa Ramanujan and the Indian National Mathematics Day

The Indian government declared 22 December to be celebrated as National Mathematics Day every year to mark the birth anniversary of the Indian mathematician Srinivasa Ramanujan. It was introduced by Prime Minister Manmohan Singh on 26 December 2011 at Madras University, to mark the 125th birth anniversary of the Indian mathematician Srinivasa Ramanujan. On this occasion Prime minister Manmohan Singh also announced that 2012 would be celebrated as the National Mathematics Year.

Since then, India's National Mathematics Day is celebrated on 22 December every year with numerous educational events held at schools and universities throughout the country. In 2017, the day's significance was enhanced by the opening of the Ramanujan Math Park in Kuppam, in Chittoor, Andhra Pradesh. National Mathematics Day is celebrated in all schools and universities throughout the country.

== See also ==
- International Day of Mathematics (Pi Day)
