= François Ortalo-Magné =

UK-based European academic

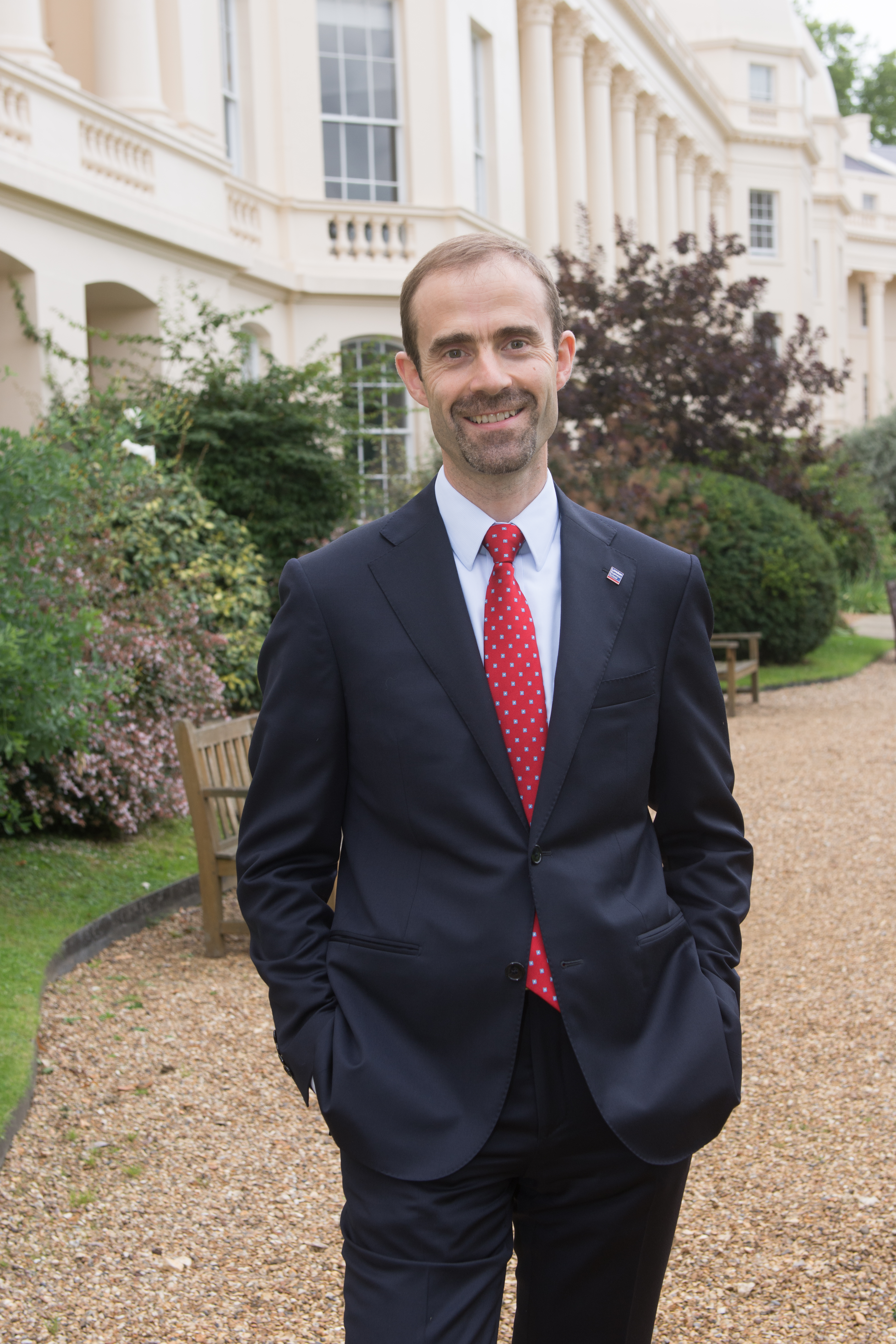
- Education: École d'ingénieurs de Purpan; University of Minnesota
- Occupations: Professor, academic administrator
- Title: Dean, London Business School
- Term: August 2017- August 2024
- Predecessor: Andrew Likierman
- Successor: Sergei Guriev

François Ortalo-Magné is a UK-based European academic. He became the dean of the London Business School in August 2017, succeeding Andrew Likierman. In August 2024, he was succeeded by Sergei Guriev.

== Early life ==
François Ortalo-Magné graduated from the École d'ingénieurs de Purpan, where he earned a master's degree in 1990. He went on to earn a PhD in Economics from the University of Minnesota in 1995.

== Career ==
Ortalo-Magné was a professor of economics at the London School of Economics until 2001. He was the Robert E. Wangard Professor of Real Estate and the chair of the Department of Real Estate and Urban Economics at the Wisconsin School of Business from 2001 to 2011, when he became its Albert O. Nicholas dean. Ortalo-Magné became dean of the London Business School in August 2017. Ortalo-Magné is an expert in urban economics. He has published research in academic journals like The Review of Economic Studies, the Journal of Urban Economics, the Review of Economic Dynamics, the International Economic Review, and The American Economic Review.
