= London Business School =

Business school affiliated to the University of London

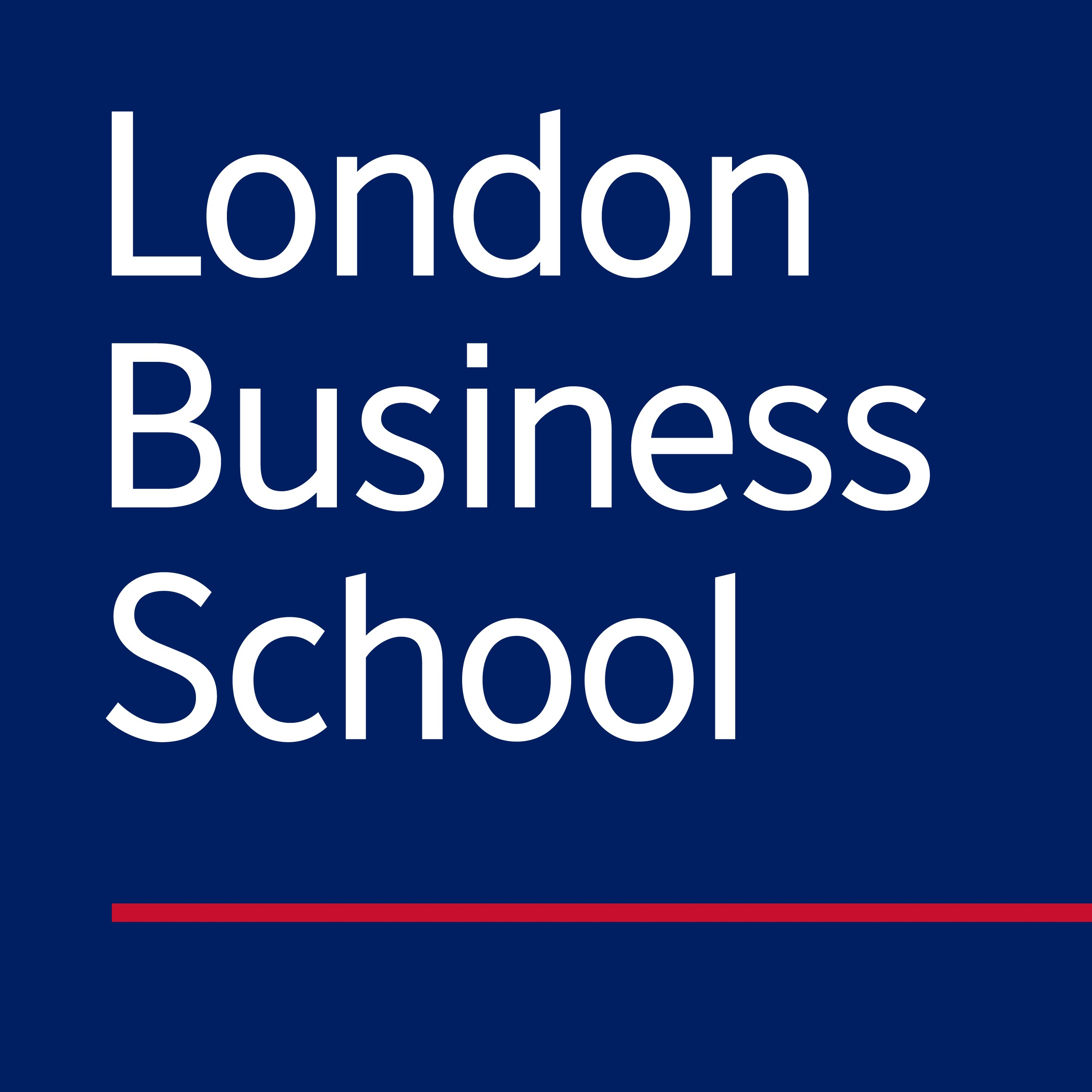
- Motto: To have a profound impact on the way the world does business
- Type: Public business school
- Established: 1964; 62 years ago
- Accreditation: AACSB, EQUIS, AMBA
- Academic affiliations: University of London
- Endowment: £78.5 million (2025)
- Budget: £202.0 million (2024/25)
- Dean: Sergei Guriev
- Academic staff: 115 (2024/25)
- Students: 2,275 (2024/25); 1,705 FTE (2024/25)
- Location: London, NW1, United Kingdom; 51°31′35″N 0°09′39″W
- Campus: London and Dubai
Colours
- Website: london.edu

London Business School (LBS) is a business school and a member institution of the University of London. LBS was established in 1964 and awards post-graduate degrees (master's degrees in management and finance, MBAs and PhDs).

London Business School's main campus is in Marylebone, London, with the main site at Sussex Place, adjacent to Regent's Park, and other nearby sites at the Taunton Centre on Taunton Place and the Sammy Ofer Centre in the former Marylebone Town Hall. LBS also has an international satellite campus in Dubai, United Arab Emirates.

== History ==
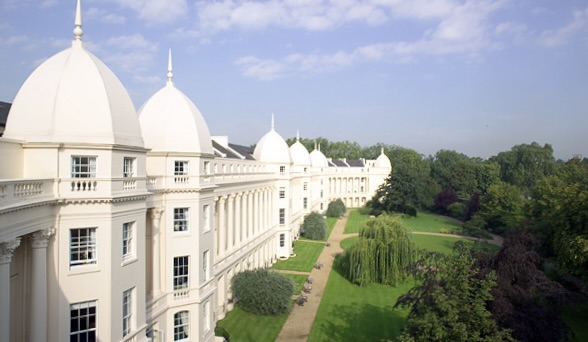
Sussex Place, main campus of the London Business School in London

The Robbins Report committee recommended in the early 1960s that at least two major postgraduate business schools should be created, and the Franks Report (led by Oliver Franks) subsequently recommended that one be founded in London and one in Manchester. An industry appeal raised £5 million, with a matching grant from the government, to establish these schools. The initial plan for the London school was for it to be a joint effort between the London School of Economics and Imperial College London. However, this plan did not develop and London Business School was instead established in 1964 under the name of the London Graduate School of Business Studies. The first meeting of the board was held in November 1964, with the first dean being appointed in April 1965 and the first two professors in May 1965. The executive education programme started in February 1966 The MBA (called an MSc until 1985) also launched in 1966. Despite Franks' recommendation that the business schools should offer 12-month MBA courses, this was a 2-year course after the US model. The part-time MBA followed in 1983.

The school was incorporated as a company limited by guarantee in 1965 and became an "institution having recognised teachers" of the University of London. In 1968, the school joined the Sloan Fellows MSc programme, funded by the Alfred P. Sloan Foundation, with an initial intake of 17 students. The first doctoral programme was established in 1969, with backing from the Ford Foundation.

The school was initially based in the fourth to tenth floors of 28 Northumberland Avenue while a permanent site was chosen. The first choice for a permanent site, between Bayswater and Edgware Road in central London, but this encountered opposition from London County Council and was eventually dropped. Eventually, the decision was made to lease 1–26 Sussex Place from the Crown Estate Commission. The neoclassical frontage, designed by John Nash, had to be retained, but the rest of the building was rebuilt for the school. This was completed in 1970 and opened by Queen Elizabeth II in November of that year. The new building combined accommodation and teaching facilities, allowing the school to begin running residential executive courses.

The Park Road building (now the Plowden Building), adjacent to the Sussex Place site and also leased from the Crown Estate, was redeveloped from 1977 following a capital campaign. Initial plans to demolish part of the terrace and replace it with a modernist building were dropped after opposition from the local council. Construction eventually began in 1981 with the facade along Park Road being retained, as had been done with Sussex Place, but the interior being rebuilt. It opened in 1982, with a later formal opening by Prince Charles in May 1983.

The school operated as a graduate school of the University of London until 1986, when it was incorporated by royal charter, which gave LBS the right to confer its own degrees (held in abeyance until 2010) and became a college of the university under the name London Business School. The school won a Queen's Award for Export in 1992. The executive MBA was launched in 1992, and the Masters in Finance programme the following year. A global executive MBA in partnership with Columbia Business School was launched in 2001.

In 1995, the school acquired a block of houses on Taunton Place and raised £8 million to convert this to an academic complex including a library, seminar rooms and offices, as well as an underground recreation centre.

In 2007 a campus was opened in Dubai. An Asian-focused version of the global executive MBA was launched in 2009 in partnership with Columbia Business School and the University of Hong Kong, along with the Masters in Management programme. In 2016, LBS launched a new programme, the Masters in Financial Analysis, aimed at recent graduates who wish to work in finance.

In 2012, the school leased Marylebone Town Hall, located close to the Sussex Place site, from Westminster City Council and restored it with the objective of expanding its teaching facilities by 70 per cent. The building was renamed "The Sammy Ofer Centre" following a donation from the Sammy Ofer Foundation for the development of the building,, and opened in 2017. In 2016, the main building on Sussex Place was renamed the Ratcliffe Building in honour of alumnus Jim Ratcliffe. In 2019, the school acquired the lease of 27 Sussex Place, adjacent to the existing buildings, from the Royal College of Obstetricians and Gynaecologists. This became the North Building. Following the donation from David and Molly Pyott and their foundation, the North Building will be renamed “The David and Molly Pyott Building” by the end of 2026. The donation of 25 million pounds, which the school itself describes as one of the largest in its history, will also fund an MBA scholarship programme over the next decade.

=== List of deans ===
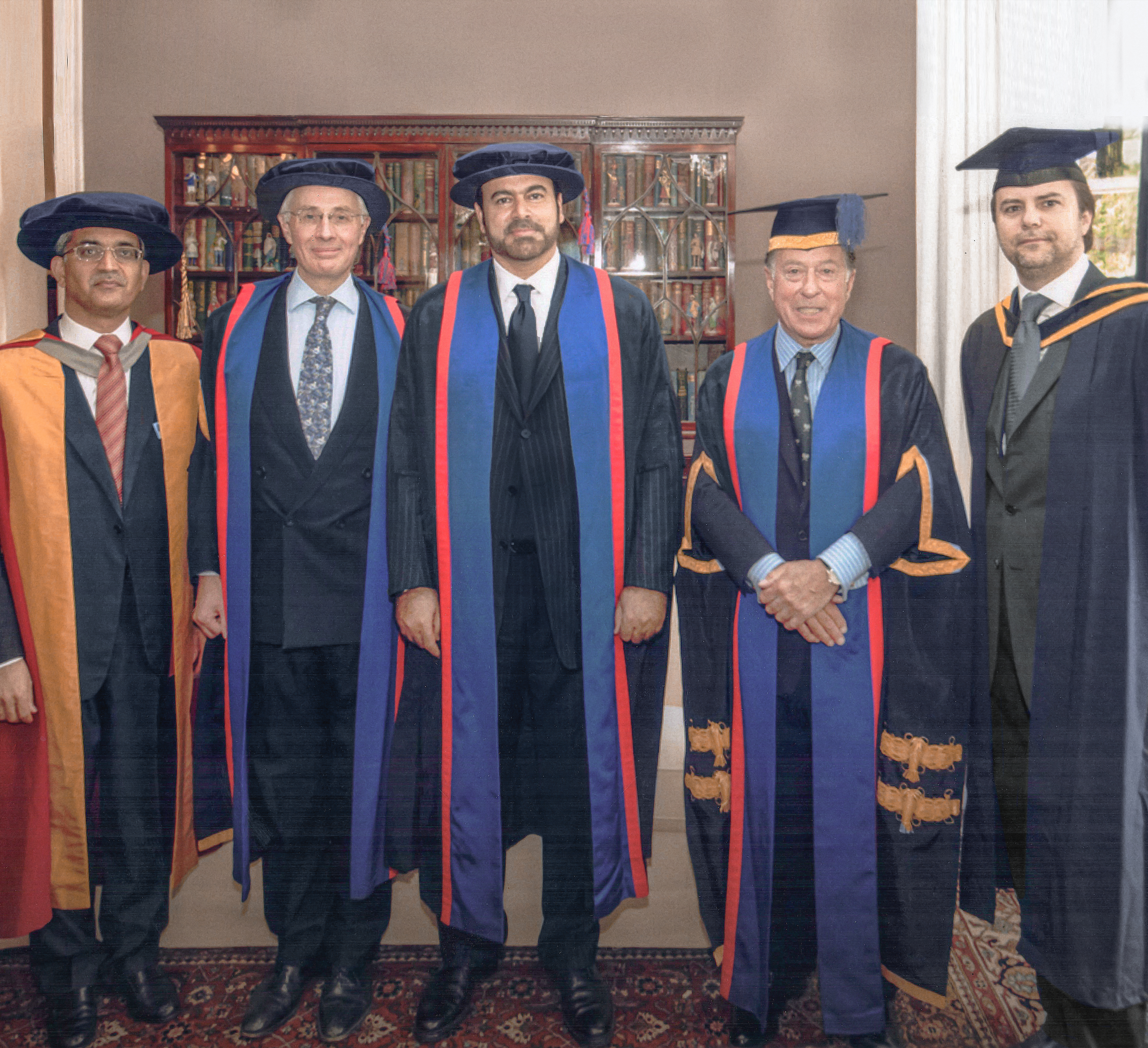
The 2008 honorary fellowship ceremony at London Business School with Dean Andrew Likierman

List of the deans from 1965 to today:

Starting year	Ending year	Name
1965	1972	Arthur Earle
1972	1984	Sir James Ball
1984	1989	Peter G. Moore
1989	1997	Sir George Bain
1998	2001	John Quelch
2002	2006	Laura Tyson
2007	2008	Robin Buchanan
2009	2017	Sir Andrew Likierman
2017	2024	François Ortalo-Magné
2024	Present	Sergey Guriyev

== Campus ==
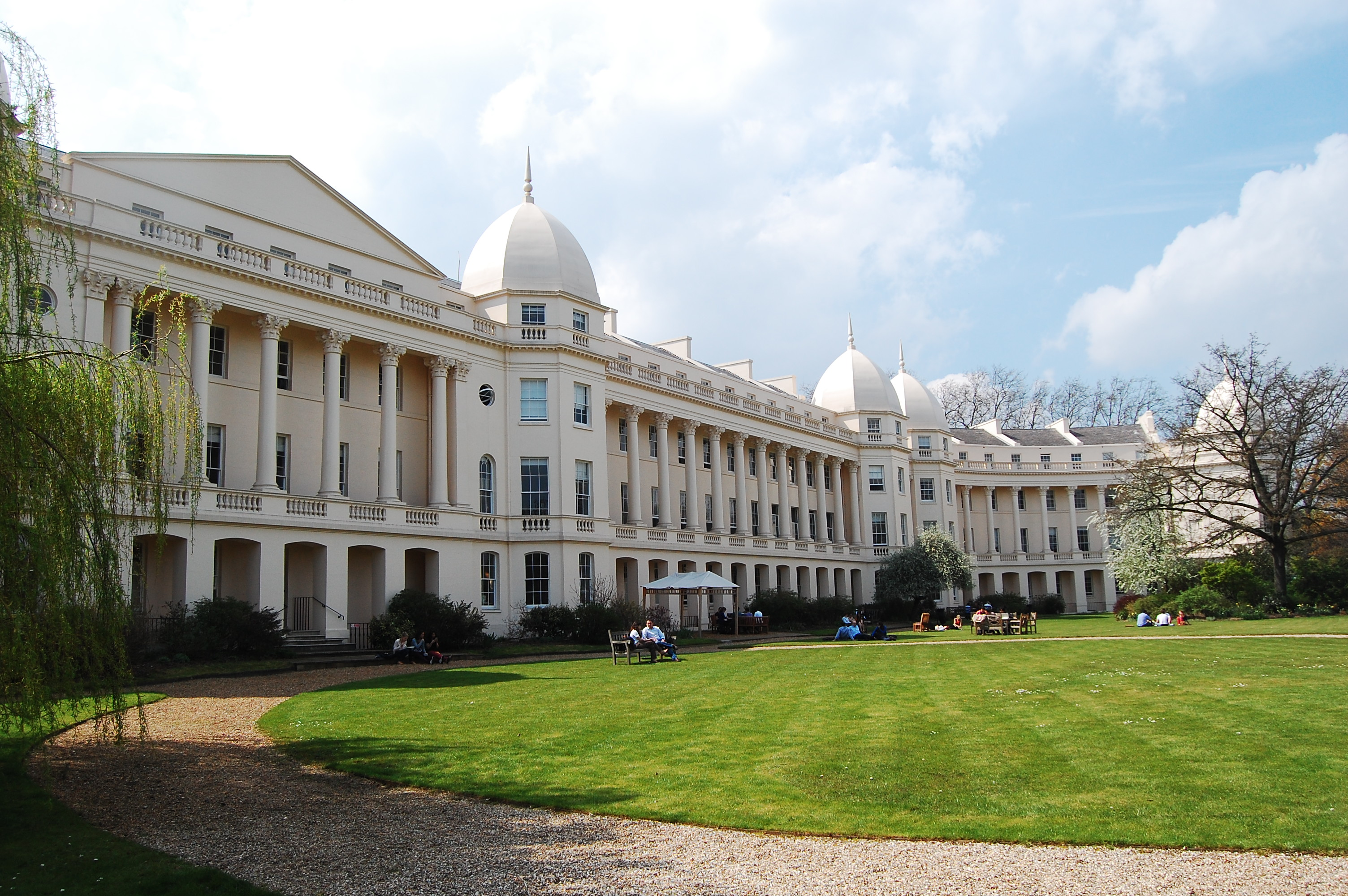
The Ratcliffe Building at the main Sussex Place campus in London

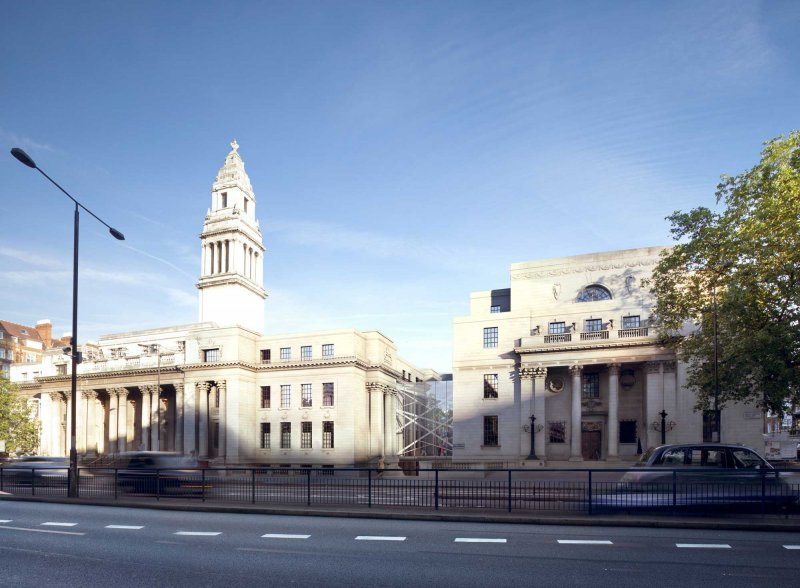
The Marylebone Town Hall, second campus in London

The main campus is at Sussex Place in Marylebone, on the perimeter of Regent's Park. It consists of three main buildings: the Ratcliffe Building, the original main building of the school, at 1–26 Sussex Place, facing Regent's Park across the Front Lawn; the Plowden Building, backing onto the Ratcliffe Building and facing Park Road; and the North Building, at 27 Sussex Place, which is to be renamed the David and Molly Pyott Building following renovations scheduled for completion in late 2026.

The Taunton Centre is at 25 Taunton Place, around 150m West of the Plowden Building.

The school also has a teaching hub at the Sammy Ofer Centre in the Old Marylebone Town Hall.

The school does not have any halls of residence of its own in London but, as part of the University of London, students are eligible for University of London intercollegiate halls.

LBS has an international satellite campus in the Dubai International Financial Centre in Dubai, United Arab Emirates. This offers an executive MBA and executive education programmes.

== Academic profile ==
HESA Student Body Composition (2024/25)
Domicile and Ethnicity	Total
British White (Note: Not be confused solely with White British)	7%
British Ethnic Minorities (Note: Includes those who indicate that they identify as Asian, Black, Mixed Heritage, Arab or any other ethnicity except White.)	8%
International EU	17%
International Non-EU	68%

=== Teaching ===
The school's full-time Master of Business Administration degree programme takes 15 to 21 months, and it also offers a one-year MBA for graduates with a Masters in Management or equivalent, as well as executive (part-time) MBA degrees (in London or Dubai), and a global executive MBA in partnership with Columbia Business School. The school also offers other one-year master's degrees, including the Master in Management and Master in Finance degrees and the Sloan Masters in Leadership and Strategy, as well as a PhD programme.

=== Reputation, rankings and accreditation ===
Business school rankings

Europe
- QS MBA: 2
- Financial Times MBA: 3

Global
- QS MBA: 9
- Financial Times MBA: 4

The school's MBA was ranked sixth globally by Quacquarelli Symonds in 2026 and joint fourth globally by the Financial Times in 2026.

The school is triple accredited, with accreditation from AACSB, AMBA and EQUIS. Courses in Dubai are approved by the Dubai Knowledge and Human Development Authority and the Dubai executive MBA is licensed and accredited by the Ministry of Education of the United Arab Emirates. The school is registered as a higher education provider with its own degree awarding powers with the Office for Students in England.

=== Research ===
The school houses two research institutes: the Institute of Entrepreneurship and Private Capital and the Wheeler Institute for Business and Development. The school submitted 106 full time equivalent academics to the business and management studies panel of the 2021 Research Excellence Framework. In the Times Higher Education analysis of results from this panel, the school was ranked third in the UK for average quality of work submitted, and 15th for research power.

== Notable people ==
=== Alumni ===
- Kaveh Alamouti – CEO of Citadel LLC Asset Management Europe
- Simon Borrows – CEO of 3i
- Ashley Almanza – CEO of G4S
- Prince Chad Al-Sherif Pasha of the Hijaz and Turkey
- Nigel Andrews, 1978 – former chairman of Old Mutual Asset Management
- Sir David Arculus – chairman, O2
- Nicholas Ashley-Cooper, 12th Earl of Shaftesbury
- Sükhbaataryn Batbold, "a degree", 1991 – former Prime Minister of Mongolia
- Pablo Zalba Bidegain – Member of European Parliament (Spain)
- Kumar Birla, 1992 – Chairman, Aditya Birla Group
- Vice Admiral Paul Boissier – Former CB Deputy Commander-in-Chief, British Navy Maritime Forces; CEO of Royal National Lifeboat Institution (RNLI)
- Don Cowan – Former CEO and President of ABN AMRO Bank Canada
- Stephen Crabb – member of the British House of Commons and former Secretary of State for Wales and for the Department for Work and Pensions
- Tomáš Drucker – Minister of Education, Research, Development and Youth and Former Minister of Health, Slovakia
- John Egan – Former CEO of Jaguar Cars, Former CEO of BAA, Chairman of Severn Trent plc
- Philip Nevill Green – Chairman of Carillion
- Justine Greening – Secretary of State for Education and member of the British House of Commons
- Gillian Keegan – British Conservative Party politician and Member of Parliament for Chichester
- Illugi Gunnarsson – Minister of Education, Science, and Culture, Iceland
- Prince Faisal bin Al Hussein – Special Assistant to Chairman & Joint Chiefs of Staff, Jordanian Armed Forces
- Hassan Jameel, Saudi businessman
- John Jennings (businessman) – former CEO, Shell
- Moez Kassam – Founder of Anson Group
- Maria Kiwanuka – Minister of Finance in Cabinet of Uganda
- Timothy Kopra – NASA astronaut
- Thomas Kwok – Vice Chairman and Managing Director, Sun Hung Kai Properties
- Alex Loudon – former professional cricketer
- Mary Marsh – former CEO of NSPCC
- Stephen Martin – former CEO of Clugston Group, director general of the Institute of Directors
- Cyrus Pallonji Mistry, former chairman and CEO of the Tata Group
- Nigel Morris – co-founder, Capital One Financial Services
- David Muir – Director of Political Strategy, to then British Prime Minister Gordon Brown MP
- Idan Ofer – Chairman of Israel Corporation / Principal of Quantum Pacific International Limited
- Paul Onwuanibe – CEO of Landmark Group
- Kenneth Ouriel – vascular surgeon and medical researcher
- Ted Pietka – Supervisory Board Member of Boryszew
- David E.I. Pyott – former Chairman, President, and CEO of Allergan
- Ramji Raghavan – founder and Chairman of Agastya International Foundation
- Jim Ratcliffe – Chairman and CEO of Ineos Chemicals Group
- Omar Samra – first Egyptian and youngest Arab to climb Mount Everest
- Sir John Sunderland – former Chairman, Cadbury Schweppes plc
- Amina Taher – VP, Etihad Aviation
- Stewart Wallis – Executive Director of New Economics Foundation
- Tony Wheeler – founder, Lonely Planet
- Babajide Sanwo-Olu – Governor of Lagos State, Nigeria
- Ibrahim Sagna – Senegalese financier
- Anita Elberse – Professor of Business Administration at Harvard Business School
- Nicholas Latifi – Former F1 driver
- Ilya Strebulaev – Professor of Private Equity and Finance, Stanford Graduate School of Business
- Soh Rui Yong – Singaporean marathon runner
- BVR Subrahmanyam – CEO of NITI Aayog and former Commerce Secretary to the Government of India
- Dmytro Dubilet – Ukrainian banker, politician, and co-founder of Monobank

=== Academics and staff ===
- Sir James Ball – economist
- Süleyman Başak – financial economist
- Sir Alan Budd – professor of economics, director of the Centre for Economic Forecasting, economic advisor for Barclays Bank, and member of the Advisory Board for Research Councils
- Terence Burns, Baron Burns – Chairman of Abbey National plc, Non-Executive Chairman of Glas Cymru, and a Non-Executive Director of Pearson Group plc.
- Rajesh Chandy – Professor of Entrepreneurship and Marketing.
- Gary Hamel – originator (with C.K. Prahalad) of the concept of core competencies of an organization, and contributed to the theoretical development and evolution of the resource-based view
- Charles Handy – former professor – London Business School, rated among Thinkers 50 – a list of the most influential living management thinkers
- Michael Jacobides – Sir Donald Gordon Chair of Entrepreneurship & Innovation
- Jack Mahoney – Dixons Professor of Business Ethics and Social Responsibility
- Constantinos C. Markides – Robert P. Bauman Professor of Strategic Leadership
- Kamalini Ramdas – Professor of Management Science and Operations and Deloitte Chair in Innovation & Entrepreneurship
- Hélène Rey – Professor of Economics
- Richard Portes – economist
- Herminia Ibarra – Charles Handy Professor of Organizational Behavior
- Julian Birkinshaw - Professor of Strategy and Entrepreneurship
- Sumantra Ghoshal (until 2004) - Professor of Strategy & International Business. He gave his name to the annual Ghoshal conference.

== See also ==
- List of business schools in Europe
