= P. K. Iyengar =

Indian nuclear physicist (1931–2011)

- Born: 29 June 1931; Tirunelveli, Tamil Nadu
- Died: 21 December 2011 (aged 80); Mumbai, India
- Known for: Nuclear Program of India; Operation Smiling Buddha; Operation Shakti; Neutron scattering Cold fission
- Awards: Padma Bhushan (1975); Bhatnagar Award (1971)
- Scientific career
- Fields: Nuclear Physics
- Workplaces: Department of Atomic Energy (DAE); Bhabha Atomic Research Centre; Atomic Energy Commission of India; Government College University
- Doctoral advisor: Bertram Neville Brockhouse

Padmanabhan Krishnagopala Iyengar (29 June 1931 – 21 December 2011), best known as P. K. Iyengar, was an Indian nuclear physicist who is widely known for his central role in the development of the nuclear program of India. Iyengar previously served as the director of BARC and former chairman of the Atomic Energy Commission of India, and he raised his voice in opposition to the nuclear agreement between India and the United States, and expressed that the deal favoured the United States.

During his last years of his life, Iyenger engaged in peace activism and greatly exhorted the normalization of bilateral relations between India and Pakistan.

== Career in Department of Atomic Energy ==
Iyengar joined the Tata Institute for Fundamental Research, Department of Atomic Energy in 1952 as a junior research scientist, undertaking a wide variety of research in neutron scattering. He later got shifted to Atomic Energy Establishment (later renamed as Bhabha Atomic Research Centre) when it was formed in 1954. In 1956, Iyengar was trained in Canada working under Nobel laureate in Physics Bertram Neville Brockhouse, contributing to path-breaking research on lattice dynamics in germanium. At the DAE, he built up and headed the team of physicists and chemists that gained international recognition for their original research contributions in this field. In 1960s, he indigenously designed the PURNIMA reactor and headed the team that successfully commissioned the reactor on 18 May 1972 at BARC.

=== Operation Smiling Buddha ===
When Ramanna took over as director of Bhabha Atomic Research Centre in 1972, the mantle of directorship of the Physics Group (PG) was handed over to Iyengar. He was one of the key scientist in the development of India's first nuclear device. The team, under Raja Ramanna tested the device under the code name Smiling Buddha on 18 May 1974. Iyengar played a leading role in the peaceful nuclear explosion at Pokharan-I, for which he was conferred the Padma Bhushan in 1975.

== Career with Bhabha Atomic Research Centre ==
Iyengar took over as Director of the Bhabha Atomic Research Centre in 1984. As director, one of his first tasks was to take charge of the construction of the Dhruva reactor, the completion of which was then in question, and bring it to a successful conclusion under his leadership. Recognizing the importance of transferring newly developed technology from research institutes to industry, he introduced a Technology Transfer Cell at the BARC to assist and speed the process. He motivated basic research in fields ranging from molecular biology, to chemistry and material science. He nucleated new technologies like lasers and accelerators, which led to the establishment of a new Centre for Advanced Technology, at Indore.

== Chairman of Atomic Energy Commission of India ==
Iyengar was appointed chairman of the Atomic Energy Commission of India and secretary to the Department of Atomic Energy in 1990. He was also appointed as chairman of the Nuclear Power Corporation of India. Under his leadership the Department of Atomic Energy vigorously pursued the nuclear power programme with the commissioning of two new power reactors at Narora and Kakrapar, and continued with the development of new reactor systems, such as liquid-sodium based fast reactors. Equal emphasis was laid on enhanced production of heavy water, nuclear fuel and special nuclear materials. He also initiated proposals for the export of heavy-water, research reactors, hardware for nuclear applications to earn precious foreign exchange.

== Cold fusion research ==
Regarding Iyengar's involvement in Indian cold fusion research, the Indian newspaper Daily News and Analysis wrote: "Iyengar also pioneered cold fusion experiments in the 1980s to prove the hypothesis that nuclear fusion can occur at ordinary temperatures under certain scenarios. The experiments were discontinued after Iyengar's exit from the nuclear establishment by some conservative scientists."

== Legacy and fame ==
Iyengar has been the recipient of many high civilian awards and honours. After retirement Iyengar served in various positions such as member of the Atomic Energy Commission, scientific advisor to the Government of Kerala, on the board of the Global Technology Development Centre, president of the Indian Nuclear Society, and a member of the Inter-governmental Indo-French Forum, besides serving on various national committees. Iyengar’s later interests focused on advances in nuclear technology for nuclear applications, issues of nuclear policy and national security, science education and the application of science in nation-building. He participated in various international meetings on non-proliferation issues. Most recently, as a founder trustee of the Agastya International Foundation, he focused on rural education and instilling creativity and scientific temperament in rural children and government school teachers. He was instrumental in drawing the support of the Homi Bhabha Centre for Science Education to help launch Agastya’s rural science fairs and its first mobile science lab in 2002.

== Awards and honours ==
- Padma Bhushan (1975)
- Bhatnagar Award (1971)
- Federation of Indian Chambers of Commerce and Industry Award for the Physical Sciences (1981)
- Raman Centenary Medal of the Indian Academy of Science (1988)
- Bhabha Medal for Experimental Physics of the Indian National Science Academy (1990)
- R. D. Birla Award of the Indian Physics Association (1992)
- Jawaharlal Nehru Birth Centenary Award (1993)
- Homi Bhabha Medal (2006)
