= Dravidian University =

University in Andhra Pradesh, India

- ద్రావిడ విశ్వ విద్యాలయం
- Type: Public
- Established: 1997; 29 years ago
- Affiliations: UGC
- Chancellor: Governor of Andhra Pradesh
- Vice-Chancellor: Chinna Mallaiah Lakkineni
- Location: Kuppam, Andhra Pradesh, India; 12.79655°N 78.30299°E
- Campus: Rural
- Website: dravidianuniversity.ac.in

The Dravidian University, Kuppam, Chittoor district, Andhra Pradesh, India was established by the Government of Andhra Pradesh, through a Legislature Act (No. 17 of 1997) with the initial support extended by the governments of Tamil Nadu, Karnataka and Kerala for an integrated development of Dravidian languages and culture. It was the brainchild of former Chief Minister N. T. Rama Rao.

== Vice-chancellors ==
Following are the former vice-chancellors of the university:

- P. V. Arunachalam, 1997–2001
- R. Srihari, 2001–2005
- K. S. Chalam, May 2005
- S. Jayarama Reddy, June–August 2005
- G. Lakshmi Narayana, 2005–2008
- C. Rathnam, August 2008 (I/C)
- Cuddapah Ramanaiah, 2008–2011
- N. Prabhakar Rao, August 2011–November 2011 (I/C)
- M.G. Gopal, November 2011–December 2011 (I/C)
- S. Chellappa, December 2011–February 2012 (I/C)
- M. G. Gopal, February–April 2012 (I/C)
- K. Rathnaiah, 2012–2015
- P. Vijaya Prakash, April–October 2015 (I/C)
- E. Sathyanarayana, 2015–2018
- Rokkam Sudarsan Rao, October 2018–January 2019 (I/C)
- Sudhakar Yedla, January–September 2019
- G. Lokanadha Reddy, September 2019–May 2020
- M. Doraswamy, July 2024–March 2026 (I/C)
- L. C. Mallaiah, March 2026–present
