= Michael Jacobides =

- Born: Michael G. Jacobides
- Occupations: Professor, Advisor & Public Speaker

Michael G. Jacobides is the Sir Donald Gordon Professor of Entrepreneurship & Innovation and Professor of Strategy at London Business School. His research focuses on strategy, ecosystems, and the effects of digital technologies and artificial intelligence on business and society. Since 2019, he has been ranked among the Thinkers50 Top 50 management thinkers worldwide.

He is Academic Advisor to the BCG Henderson Institute, Lead Advisor at Evolution Ltd, and a Non-Executive Director at Aegis, a cybersecurity firm built on AI technologies. Jacobides has advised Fortune 500 companies, technology ventures, and policymakers in Europe, the US, and Asia, and has served as Chief Digital Economy Advisor at the Hellenic Competition Commission. He is also a member of the World Economic Forum’s AI Governance Alliance, where he co-authored the White Paper on Platforms and Ecosystems.

== Research ==
Jacobides studied at the University of Athens, the University of Cambridge, and Stanford University, and received his PhD from the Wharton School of the University of Pennsylvania. He has held visiting positions at Harvard Business School, NYU, Cambridge, Imperial College London, Bocconi University, Singapore Management University, and the University of Paris.

His research has been published in journals including the Strategic Management Journal, Strategy Science, Organization Science, Research Policy, and the Academy of Management Journal. He is co-Editor of Industrial and Corporate Change. His article “Towards a Theory of Ecosystems” (with Carmelo Cennamo and Annabelle Gawer) is the most read article in the Strategic Management Journal. His article “How to Compete When Industries Digitize and Collide” received the 2023 Best Article Award from California Management Review.

== Advisory work ==
Jacobides is Academic Advisor to the BCG Henderson Institute and Lead Advisor of Evolution Ltd, an advisory boutique focusing on digital ecosystems and AI. He is also a Non-Executive Director of Aegis, an AI-native cybersecurity services firm.

In public policy, he was Chief Digital Economy Advisor at the Hellenic Competition Commission and has contributed to global discussions on AI and digital ecosystems as part of the World Economic Forum’s AI Governance Alliance.

He is a frequent public speaker and has appeared at industry and policy events including the World Economic Forum in Davos, the AI Summit, and TEDx. His practitioner articles have been published in Harvard Business Review, California Management Review, Forbes, Fortune, and the Financial Times.
