= P.E.S. Institute of Medical Sciences and Research =

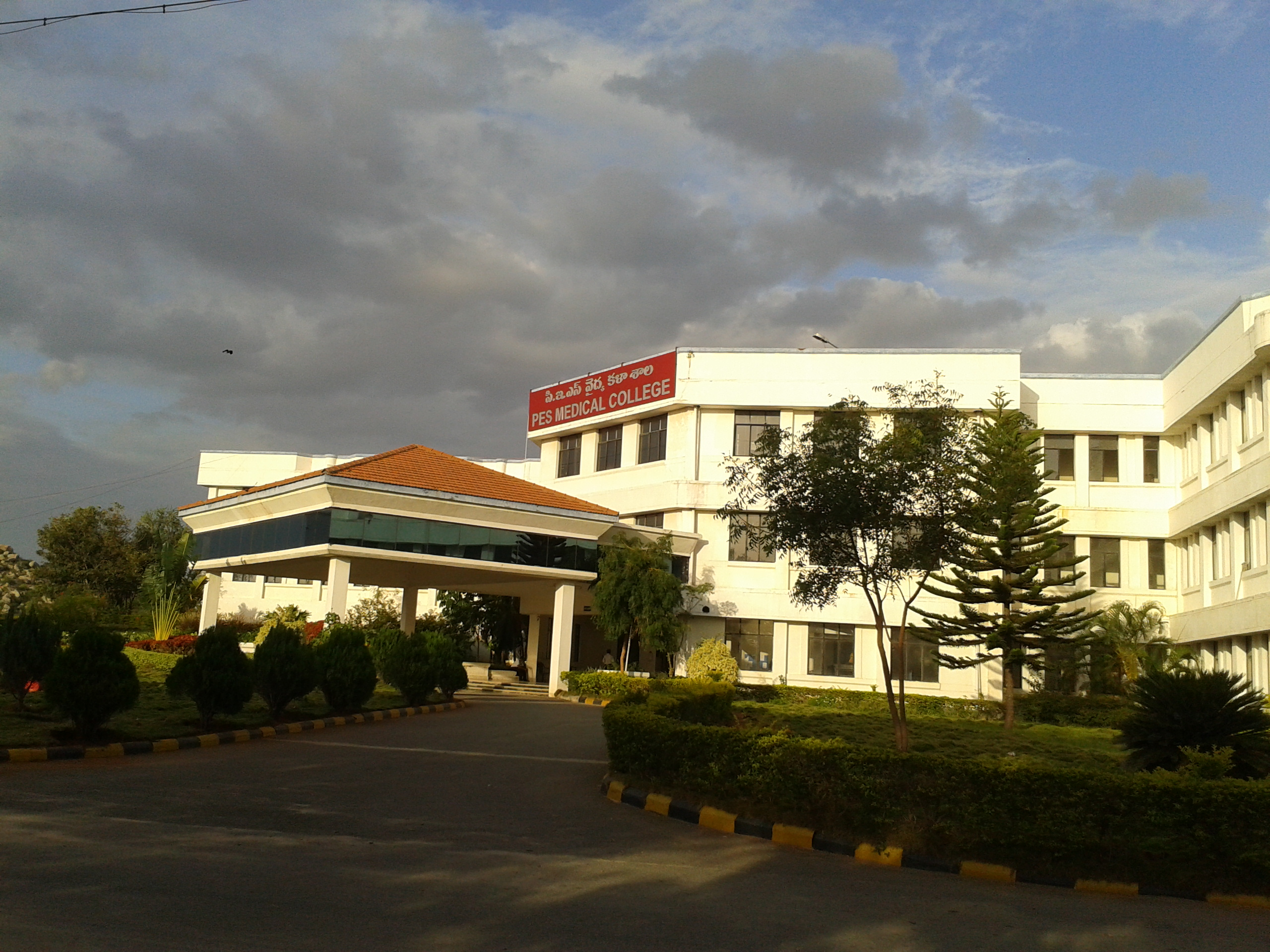
- Type: Society
- Established: 11 September 2001
- Affiliations: Dr. YSR University of Health Sciences
- Dean: Prof. Dr. H.R Krishna Rao
- Undergraduates: 150 per year
- Location: Kuppam, Andhra Pradesh, India; 12.7907°N 78.3658°E
- Campus: Gudupalli
- Website: https://pesimsr.pes.edu/

The P.E.S. Institute of Medical Sciences and Research (PESIMSR) is the first and only medical college in the town of Kuppam, Andhra Pradesh, India. It was established on 11 September 2001. It was inaugurated by Dr. A. P. J. Abdul Kalam and N. Chandrababu Naidu. It is affiliated to Dr. NTR University of Health Sciences (NTRUHS), Vijayawada. The medical college is run by the People's Education Society. The college has been approved by the Medical Council of India.

== Admission procedure for undergraduate courses ==
To be eligible for admission to the undergraduate M.B.B.S course, the candidate should have passed two years Intermediate Education conducted by the Board of Intermediate studies, Hyderabad, with Physics, Chemistry and Biology as optional subjects or any other examination recognized as equivalent to it by NTR University of Health Sciences, Vijayawada, Andhra Pradesh, India.

The candidate should have secured not less than 50% of the total marks in science subjects taken together at the qualifying examination. Proficiency in English is essential and the candidate should be 17 years of age at the time of admission.

== Postgraduate clinical courses ==
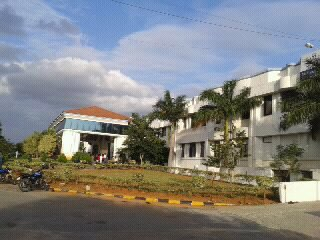
The attached hospital

- Doctor of Medicine — A three-year course in the following specialties: Internal Medicine, Paediatrics, Radiology, Anaesthesiology, Dermatology, Psychiatry and Emergency Medicine.
- MS - (Master of Surgery) A three-year course in the following specialties: General Surgery, Orthopaedics, Obstetrics & Gynaecology, Ophthalmology, and Otorhinolaryngology.
- Postgraduate diploma (two-year) courses in Obstetrics & Gynecology, Otorhinolaryngology, Paeditrics, and Radiology.

Non-clinical courses

- MS-A three-year course in Anatomy.
- MD — A three-year course in Physiology, Biochemistry, Pharmacology, Pathology, Microbiology, Forensic Medicine & Community Medicine.

The qualification for all postgraduate and postgraduate diploma courses is an MBBS degree from any Medical Council of India recognized medical college in India or an equivalent foreign degree which is recognized by the MCI.

== Campus ==
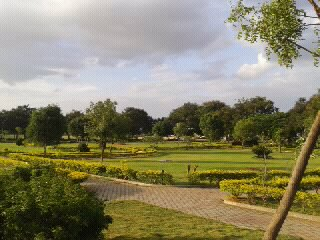
The college garden

The college has a pollution-free large campus comprising staff quarters, a library, separate hostels for men and women and an auditorium. There are sports facilities for volleyball, lawn tennis, table-tennis, shuttle-badminton, cricket and other sports, and a gymnasium. Cricket is a popular sport.
