= Ibrahim Sagna =

Senegalese financier

- Born: Ibrahim Sagna; 1975 (age 50–51); Senegal
- Education: Boston College; Carroll School of Management
- Occupations: Financier, business executive
- Employer: Silverbacks Holdings (2022–present)
- Known for: Private equity
- Title: Executive chairman at Silverbacks Holdings

Ibrahim Sagna (born 1975) is a Senegalese financier and business executive. He serves as executive chairman at Silverbacks Holdings, a Mauritius-based private investments firm, since November 2022. Addition to this, he is a founding partner and the vice-chairman of Cape Town Tigers, the BNL and the BAL participating basketball club, since July 2022. Prior to this, Sagna served at African Export-Import Bank as global head responsible for advisory and capital markets between June 2017 and October 2022.

From August 2015 until June 2017, Sagna was head of financial advisory at Africa Finance Corporation. Between 2014 and 2016, Sagna was a board director of the Rwanda Capital Markets Authority, a Kigali based CMA operates as the capital market regulator of Rwanda that facilitated in the creation of the Rwanda Stock Exchange. Sagna started career as a financier in U.S in 1996 after graduating with Bachelor of Science in finance from Boston College. Since September 1996, he served at International Monetary Fund as economic systems officer based in Washington, D.C, U.S. until September 1998. Between November 1999 and August 2004, he was investment officer at Emerging Capital Partners based in Washington, D.C, U.S. In July 2023, Sagna was appointed to serve on the governing body of Global Sports Summit. And in the same year, he was listed on Top 100 Most Influential Leaders in Africa by the New African.

== Early life and education ==
Sagna born in 1975, Dakar, Senegal. Between 1992 and 1996, he attended Boston College in U.S., he graduated with Bachelor of Science in finance, general management, and information systems. In 1998, Sagna further enrolled in Carroll School of Management in U.S. to pursue a postgraduate degree, and he earned a Master of Science in finance there in 1999. While he was at the college, Sagna co-founded PATU (Presenting Africa To U), the African student association at Boston College. Sagna earned various executive educations, where since 1996, he holds certificates in General Management from Harvard Business School. He has master class certificate in Private Equity from London Business School earned in 2008, and certificate in Leadership Transition courses from INSEAD since 2021.

== Career ==
After graduating at Boston College with a Bachelor of Science in finance in 1996, Sagna started working at International Monetary Fund as economic systems officer based in Washington, D.C, U.S. In November 1999, he joined Emerging Capital Partners in same city, he was appointed as investments officer he served in this position for five years until August 2004. In November of the same year, Sagna became the chairman and CEO responsible for Africa at The Resource Group, a Washington DC–based investment holding company, popularly known to own IBEX Global. He served in this position until February 2007.

In February 2008, Sagna relocated from Washington DC, U.S. to Geneva, Swiss to join Millennium Global Investments Limited, he was appointed as head responsible for Africa market opportunities. He served this position for one year long, in March 2009, Sagna moved to England to serve as CEO at Blackthorn Capital Partners, a London based pan-African investment firm, until February 2012. Since 2012, he served as managing partner at Century Private Investments renamed to First Continent Group, a Seychelles based investment holding company focused on asset management related solutions primarily targeting Namibia and Rwanda sovereigned owned entities. Addition to this, in August 2015, Sagna joined Africa Finance Corporation, he was appointed as a head responsible for financial advisory. He served this position for two years, in June 2017, Sagna joined African Export-Import Bank where he served as global head responsible for advisory and capital markets based in Cairo, Egypt. The position he served until November 2022 when he became executive chairman at Silverbacks Holdings. Sagna is on boards of a Johannesburg-based Founders Factory Africa and a Kigali-based Fund for Export Development of Africa (FEDA). He is an advisory board member for Dubai-based Beacon Media, and a mentor at California-based Draper University.
