= Gudupalle =

- Village
- Interactive map of Gudupalle
- Location in Andhra Pradesh, India
- Coordinates: 12.9795°N 78.5022°E
- Country: India
- State: Andhra Pradesh
- District: Chittoor
- Mandal: Gudupalle

Area
  - Total: 1.5 km^{2} (0.58 sq mi)
- Time zone: UTC+5:30 (IST)
- PIN: 517426
- Vehicle registration: AP 03

Gudupalle is a village and mandal in Chittoor district of the Indian state of Andhra Pradesh. It is the mandal headquarters of Gudupalle mandal. This mandal is under Kuppam Revenue Division.The village lies on NH-4 highway connecting Bangalore and Chennai.

It has a railway station, police station, post office and Bank. People across Andhra Pradesh, Tamil Nadu and Karnataka are living in Gudupalli mandal. It also shares borders with the Krishnagiri district of Tamil Nadu and the Kolar district of Karnataka. Gudupalli is famous for its agricultural crops like flowers, paddy, Ragi and tomato etc. Most of the population in this mandal are able to communicate in Telugu, Kannada and Tamil. Indian education non-profitable trust Agastya International Foundation is located in this area. Many of the people across the mandal travel to Metro cities like Bangalore and Chennai for their daily work. This mandal is well connected with railways and roadways to the nearby cities hence most of the farmers export their crops to the cities like KGF, Kolar, Kuppam, Bangalore and Chennai.
