= Ramanujan Math Park =

Indian museum and activity center

Coordinates: 13.1135°N 80.2906°E

The Ramanujan Math Park is an Indian museum and activity center dedicated to mathematics education inside the Agastya Campus Creativity Lab located in Kuppam, in Chittoor, Andhra Pradesh. It is named after the Indian mathematician Srinivasa Ramanujan (1887–1920) who was from nearby Madras State. It is a joint project of Agastya International Foundation and the non-profit organization Gyanome.

Agastya is known for its hands-on teaching methods and the Math Park follows this tradition. The park features both indoor and outdoor exhibits as well as interactive touch screen stations, all designed to enhance the mathematical experience. There are plans to replicate this math park experience at other Government run schools elsewhere in India.

== History ==
Ramanujan Math Park was conceived, partially funded and executed by Sujatha Ramdorai and her husband Srinivasan Ramdorai along with V.S.S Sastry, an Indian mathematics communicator based in nearby Kolar. It was inaugurated in 2017, on 22 December, Ramanujan's birthday and the day celebrated in India as National Math Day.
