= Andrew Likierman =

British academic (born 1943)

Sir Andrew Likierman
- Born: 30 December 1943 (age 82); Colne, Lancashire
- Education: Balliol College, Oxford
- Occupation: Academic
- Title: former Dean, London Business School
- Term: 2008 - 2017

Sir John Andrew Likierman (born 30 December 1943), is Professor of Management Practice at the London Business School.

== Early life ==
Andrew Likierman was born in Colne, Lancashire on 30 December 1943. He earned a Master's degree in Philosophy, Politics and Economics at Balliol College, University of Oxford.

== Career ==
Private sector: Likierman started as a management trainee with English Sewing Cotton (later Tootal Ltd) in Manchester, qualifying as a management accountant. He later moved to his family's firm, Qualitex Ltd, running a textile plant in Germany and was then Managing Director of the Overseas Division. He later started his own book business, Ex Libris Ltd. Non-executive roles: Likierman's previous non-executive roles have included Chairman of the market research firm MORI Ltd, the Economists' Bookshop Group and the United Kingdom's National Audit Office, Deputy Chairman of the Tavistock and Portman NHS Trust, Senior National Independent Director of Times Newspapers Holdings Ltd and of Monument Bank, Director and Risk Committee Chair of the Bank of England, Director of Barclays Bank plc and Director and Remuneration Committee Chair of insurance company Beazley.

Academic: Likierman was a faculty member at the University of Leeds and has been a faculty member at London Business School from 1974–1976, 1979–1993 and since 2004. His positions have included Lecturer, Senior Lecturer and Professor of Accounting and Financial Control; Founding Director of the Executive MBA Programme; Director of the Institute of Public Sector Management; Acting Dean (January - July 2007) and Dean (January 2009 - July 2017).

His research and publications - for academics and practitioners - were first in the field of public finance (ie Public Sector Accounting and Financial Control, 4 editions 1983-92, Chapman and Hall) then performance measurement (ie The Five Traps of Performance Measurement, Harvard Business Review, October 2009) The basis of his current research, on managerial judgment, was published in the January/February 2020 edition of the Harvard Business Review and in the book "Judgement at work: Making Better Choices", Profile Books 2025 (paperback format 2026). Applications have included his booklet on independent judgment on the Board published by the Chartered Governance Institute in 2021. The Financial Reporting Council's Guidance on Independent Professional Judgment published in 2022 draws on his work.

Government: Likierman was Head of the Government Accountancy Service, Managing Director of the Financial Management, Reporting and Audit Directorate of HM Treasury and its Principal Finance Officer (Finance Director). He had earlier worked in the Cabinet Office as a member of the Central Policy Review Staff (the "Think Tank"). He was knighted in 2001 for his work on moving UK Government finances from a cash to an accruals basis through Resource Accounting and Budgeting (Government Resources and Accounts Act 2000).

Professional: Likierman advised five Parliamentary Select Committees on public expenditure and control issues, was President of the Chartered Institute of Management Accountants (CIMA) and Chairman of a government study on professional liability. In the field of corporate governance, he was a member of the Cadbury Committee, Chairman of the group which compiled a governance code for central government departments and one of six international experts appointed by Kofi Annan, when Secretary-General of the United Nations, to advise on their corporate governance.

In addition to his knighthood, Likierman has been awarded honorary degrees from four universities, was presented with the CIMA Gold Medal and was non-executive of the year in the public/not-for-profit sector in the Sunday Times Awards. The Library of the London Business School was named the Likierman Library in recognition of the joint efforts of Likierman and his wife Meira in fundraising for the School during his period as Dean.

== Personal life ==
Likierman was married to Meira (Dr Meira Likierman) who died in 2019. He has two step-children.
