= Ramakuppam =

- Mandal
- Nickname: Ramakuppam
- Interactive map of Ramakuppam
- Location in Andhra Pradesh, India
- Coordinates: 12°54′1″N 78°29′12″E
- Country: India
- State: Andhra Pradesh
- District: Chittoor
- Mandal: Ramakuppam

Languages
  - Official: Telugu
- Time zone: UTC+5:30 (IST)
- PIN: 517401
- Vehicle registration: AP

Ramakuppam is a village in Chittoor district of the Indian state of Andhra Pradesh. It is the mandal headquarters of Ramakuppam mandal. It is under Kuppam Revenue Division.
