= Gudupalle mandal =

Mandal in Chittoor district, Andhra Pradesh, India

- Mandal
- Interactive map of Gudupalle mandal
- Location in Andhra Pradesh, India Gudupalle mandal (India)
- Coordinates: 12.787°N 78.287°E
- Country: India
- State: Andhra Pradesh
- District: Chittoor
- Revenue division: Kuppam
- Time zone: UTC+05:30 (IST)

Gudupalle mandal is one of the 31 mandals in Chittoor district in the Indian state of Andhra Pradesh. It is a part of Kuppam revenue division.
