= Kuppam revenue division =

Administrative division in Andhra Pradesh, India

- Revenue division in Chittoor district
- Country: India
- State: Andhra Pradesh
- District: Chittoor
- Formed: 4 April 2022
- Founder: Government of Andhra Pradesh
- Headquarters: Kuppam
- Time zone: UTC+05:30 (IST)

Kuppam revenue division is an administrative division in the Chittoor district of the Indian state of Andhra Pradesh. It is one of the 4 Revenue Divisions in the district with 4 mandals under its administration with headquarters at Kuppam.

== Administration ==
Kuppam Sub Collector and Sub Divisional Magistrate Revenue Divisional Officer :- Srinivasulu Raju

There are 4 mandals in the division.

1. Gudupalle
2. Kuppam
3. Ramakuppam
4. Santhipuram

== See also ==
- List of revenue divisions in Andhra Pradesh
- List of mandals in Andhra Pradesh
- Chittoor district
- Chittoor revenue division
- Palamaner revenue division
- Nagari revenue division
