= Agastya International Foundation =

Indian educational organisation

- Industry: Education
- Founded: 1999
- Headquarters: Bangalore, India
- Area served: India
- Key people: Ramji Raghavan (Chairman); Mahavir Kumar (Managing Trustee); Rakesh Jhunjhunwala; Alok Oberoi; Dr. V. K. Aatre; H. N. Srihari; Adhirath Sethi; Vidya Shah; Utpal Seth
- Number of employees: 1500+
- Website: www.agastya.org

Agastya International Foundation (Agastya) is an Indian education trust and non-profit organization based in Bangalore, India whose mission is "to spark curiosity, nurture creativity and instil confidence" among economically disadvantaged children and teachers in India. A team of scientists, educators, and entrepreneurs led by Ramji Raghavan founded Agastya in 1999. Agastya's founders include the late K.V. Raghavan, former chairman of Engineers India Limited and Dr. P.K. Iyengar, former chairman of the Indian Atomic Energy Commission. Agastya runs hands-on science and art education programs in rural, semi-urban, and urban regions across 19 Indian states. It is one of the world's largest mobile and hands-on science education programs catering to economically disadvantaged children and public-school teachers.

== Programs ==
=== Campus Creativity Lab ===
Agastya has a "Campus Creativity Lab" located on a 172-acre campus in Kuppam, Andhra Pradesh. It houses science and art centers, including among other labs an astronomy center, a planetarium, a center for creative teaching, an innovation hub, a science model-making center, and the Ramanujan Math Park, an open-air ecology lab. The school has 800 teachers and 280 night school volunteers. The campus welcomes over 650 children every day from 8 to 10 schools, additionally, teachers from seven Indian states are trained here.

The school has cumulatively reached over eight million with around 1.5 million children every year apart from 2.5 million teachers. In 2016, the school had a ₹300 million ($4.1 million) annual budget, 850 employees, 138 mobile lab-vans, 50 labs on bikes, and 60 science centers spread around the 172-acre main campus in Kuppam.

=== Other educational programs ===
Agastya's programs across India are also delivered by over 190 Mobile Lab and iMobile Lab Vans, 90 Lab-on-Bikes and TechLaBikes, 100 Science Centers, and nearly 700 night village school centers. It has trained over 30,000 Young Instructor Leaders (peer-to-peer teachers). Through its Young Instructor Leader (YIL) program begun in 2007, the foundation promotes and nurtures children of exceptional ability to learn. The program became a game-changer for many students, for example by teaching children to boost their organizational prowess and develop their decision-making skills. It also has encouraged many students to overcome stage fright.

The foundation operates mobile labs that cover village schools in and around the district, thereby enabling children to perform experiments by themselves. As of January 2020, Agastya has directly reached over 12 million children (50% girls) and 250,000 teachers from vulnerable and economically disadvantaged communities. As a charitable trust, Agastya is funded by Corporate Social Responsibility (CSR) engagement and donations, governmental funding, and individual donations. In 2010, Agastya signed a Memorandum of Understanding (MoU) with the Karnataka state government to establish core science activity centers in five districts in north Karnataka. The foundation conducted a science fair in Bihar in 2012 which reached out to 24,000 students and 1,100 teachers through a bequest of the Late Mr. Abdul Kalam (Ex-President of India) to sponsor a program in Bihar.

One of the organization's central aims is to develop student curiosity in the world around them and to launch them on a path of lifetime discovery and understanding.

== Activities ==
As a result of the COVID-19 outbreak (2020) Agastya has provided online training for public school teachers in over 15 states, and has helped students set up science labs at home.

== Awards and recognitions ==
Agastya won the Google Global Impact Award in 2013 and was ranked among the top 100 global innovators by The Rockefeller Foundation Next Century Awards. In 2016, Agastya's founder Ramji Raghavan received the Deshpande Foundation's Sandbox Catalyst Award from Nobel laureate Muhammad Yunus and the Innovation for India Award from the Marico Innovation Foundation.

In 2019 Agastya received an Andhra Pradesh State Green Award for its work to regenerate the ecosystem of its 172-acre campus, which is documented in the book, 'The Roots of Creativity'. In 2020, Agastya was featured in the book, 'Seven Sutras of Innovation' by Nikhil Inamdar, as one of eight organizations in India that as "start-ups to scale-ups are transforming India". As the organization's efforts have gained recognition around the world, it has been approached by well-known educational organizations for experiments in educational innovation. The project-based learning program, for example, was started by Franklin W. Olin College of Engineering in Massachusetts with Agastya.
